= Cyfeilliog =

Welsh bishop (died c. 927)

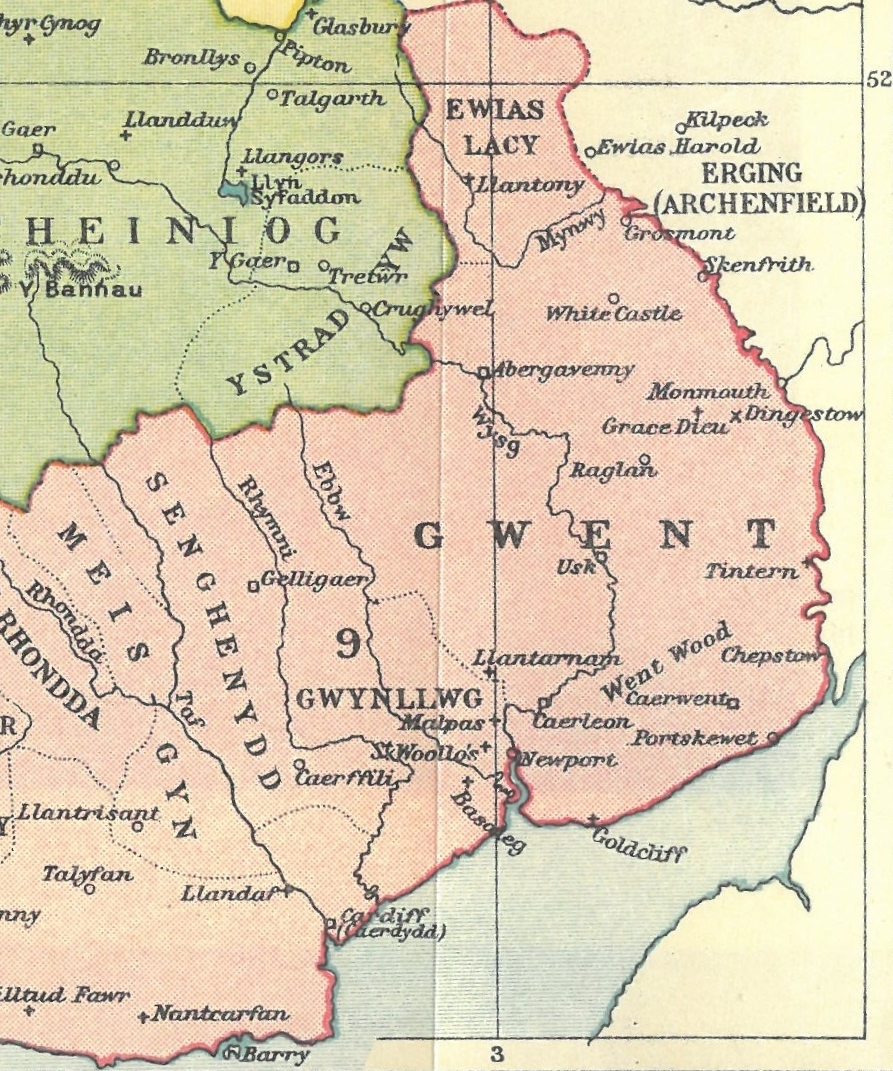
Medieval south-east Wales. Ergyng, north of Gwent, is shown as part of Mercia. Glywysing is the number "9" west of Gwent.

Cyfeilliog (Welsh pronunciation: [kəˈvɛiɬjɔɡ]) or Cyfeiliog (Welsh: [kəˈvɛiljɔɡ], in Old Welsh Cemelliauc; probably died 927) was a bishop in south-east Wales. The location and extent of his diocese is uncertain, but lands granted to him are mainly close to Caerwent, suggesting that his diocese covered Gwent. There is evidence that his diocese extended into Ergyng (now south-west Herefordshire). He is recorded in charters dating from the mid-880s to the early tenth century.

In 914 he was captured by the Vikings and ransomed by Edward the Elder, King of the Anglo-Saxons, for 40 pounds of silver. Edward's assistance is regarded by historians as evidence that he inherited the overlordship of his father, Alfred the Great, over the south-east Welsh kingdoms.

Cyfeilliog is probably the author of a cryptogram (encrypted text) which was added as a marginal note to the ninth-century collection of poetry known as the Juvencus Manuscript. Composing the cryptogram would have required knowledge of Latin and Greek. The twelfth-century Book of Llandaff records his death in 927, but some historians are sceptical as they think that this date is late for a bishop active in the 880s.

== Political background ==
Cyfeilliog's diocese was located in south-east Wales. In the ninth century, the area was divided into three kingdoms, which were sometimes combined by more powerful kings. Gwent, north of the Severn Estuary, was south of Ergyng (now south-west Herefordshire) and east of Glywysing (now Glamorgan). Mercia, the Anglo-Saxon kingdom on the eastern Welsh border, had claimed hegemony over most of Wales since the early ninth century. In 873 the Vikings drove out King Burgred of Mercia and appointed Ceolwulf as a client king. Ceolwulf maintained Mercian efforts to control the Welsh, and in 878 he defeated and killed Rhodri Mawr (Rhodri the Great), King of Gwynedd in north Wales. Around 879, Ceolwulf was replaced by Æthelred, Lord of the Mercians. In 881, Rhodri's sons defeated Æthelred in battle, but he continued to dominate the south-east Welsh kingdoms, and Rhodri's sons sought the protection of King Alfred the Great of Wessex. Alfred's Welsh biographer, Asser, wrote:

At that time [late 880s], and for a considerable time before then, all the districts of right-hand [southern] Wales belonged to King Alfred, and still do ... Hywel ap Rhys (the King of Glywysing) and Brochfael and Ffernfael (sons of Meurig and kings of Gwent), driven by the might and tyrannical behaviour of Ealdorman Æthelred and the Mercians, petitioned King Alfred of their own accord, in order to obtain lordship and protection from him in the face of their enemies.

== Cryptogram ==
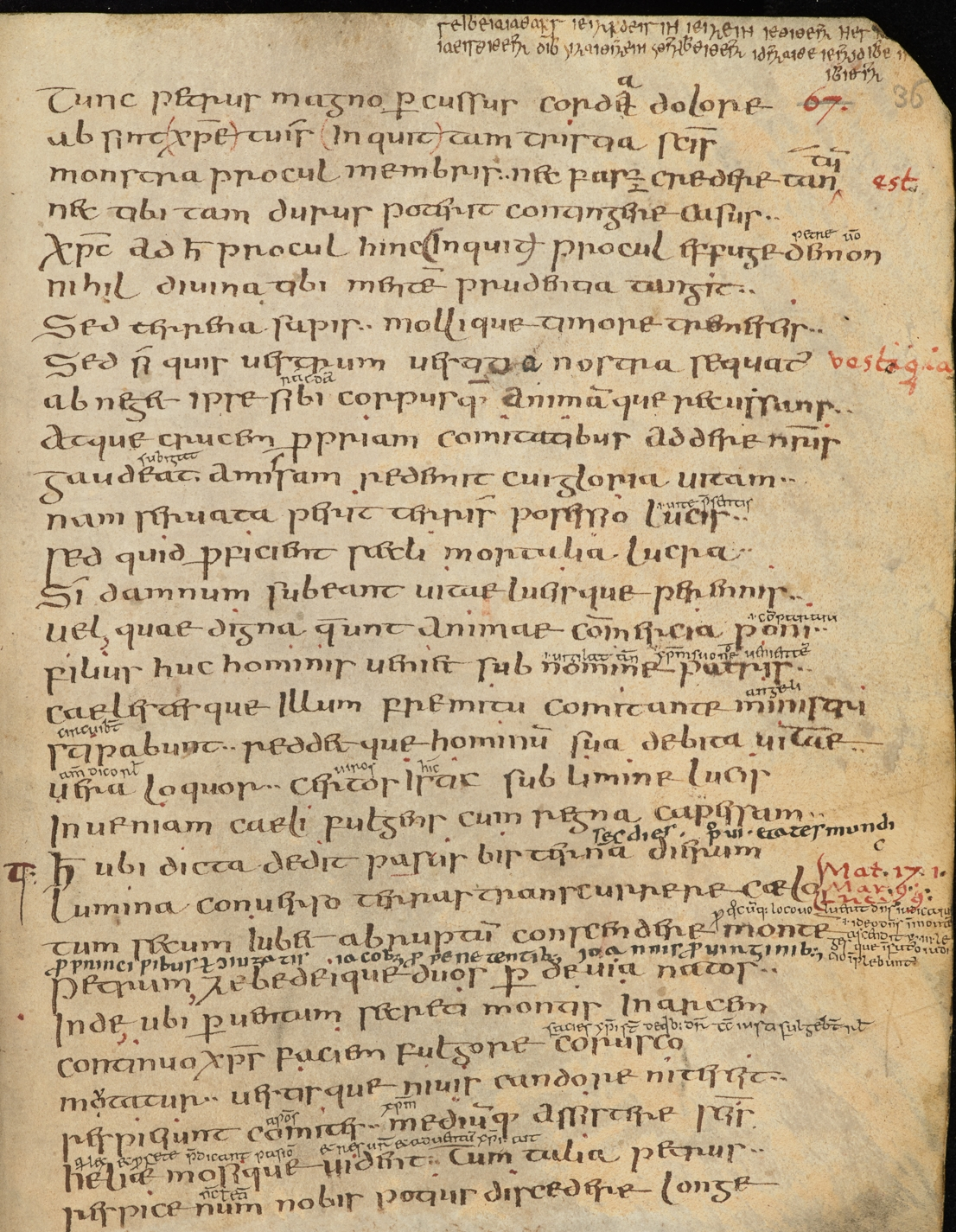
Page of the Juvencus Manuscript with the cryptogram in small letters at top right

A cryptogram (encrypted text) in the Juvencus Manuscript, which was written in Wales in the second half of the ninth century, praises a priest called Cemelliauc (the Old Welsh spelling of the Modern Welsh Cyfeilliog). Such cryptograms usually contained the names of their authors, in this case almost certainly Bishop Cyfeilliog as his name was uncommon and he is the only known person with that name who was active when the cryptogram was written. It is in Latin, with each letter replaced by the Greek numeral for the number of the letter in the Latin alphabet. It is described by the scholar Helen McKee as "charmingly boastful", and it reads in translation, with some words missing due to deterioration of the manuscript at the edge of the page:

Cemelliauc the learned priest
[ ] this without any trouble
To God, brothers, constantly,
Pray for me [ ].

The cryptogram is in a different hand from the rest of the manuscript, and it is probably Cyfeilliog's only contribution to it. The main scribe was Núadu, which is an Irish name, and the code of the cryptogram was probably invented by an Irish scholar called Dubthach at the court of Gwynedd in the first half of the ninth century. The cryptogram is one of several indications of Welsh–Irish links in the Juvencus Manuscript.

== Ecclesiastical appointments ==
Cyfeilliog may have been an abbot before he became a bishop. He is included in a list of abbots of Llantwit said to have been in a "very decayed and rent" parchment discovered in about 1719, but as the source for the document was the forger Iolo Morganwg, it is uncertain whether it was genuine. The historian Patrick Sims-Williams comments that the fact that Cyfeilliog is not mentioned in any charter before he became a bishop "leaves open the possibility that he really is the Camelauc listed among the abbots of Llantwit, dubious though the source is".

Cyfeilliog is first recorded in charters dating to the mid-880s. According to a Canterbury Cathedral roll, he was consecrated as a bishop by Æthelred, who was Archbishop of Canterbury between 870 and 888. Historians are uncertain of the validity of the list, but as southern Welsh kings accepted Alfred's overlordship in the 880s, acknowledgement of the primacy of Canterbury by bishops at this time would not be unlikely. Three clerical witnesses to Cyfeilliog's charters also witnessed those of Bishop Nudd, and another three those of Bishop Cerennyr, probably because these bishops were Cyfeilliog's predecessors, and Cyfeilliog inherited members of their episcopal households. Cerennyr was active over the whole of the south-east, suggesting that he had a superior status. In a list of bishops in the twelfth-century Book of Llandaff Cyfeilliog is placed after Nudd.

== Diocese ==
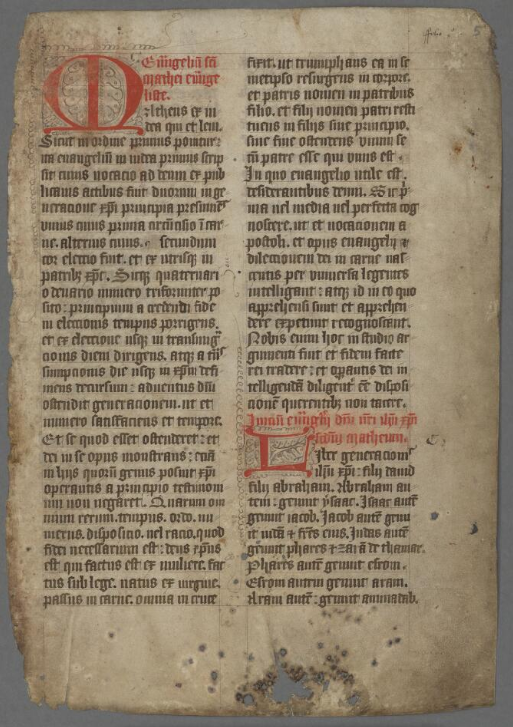
Page of the Book of Llandaff in the National Library of Wales

The Book of Llandaff claims that there was a succession of bishops of Llandaff, covering the whole of south-east Wales between the River Wye and the River Towy, from the fifth century onwards. This is accepted by the Welsh historian John Edward Lloyd in 1939 in his History of Wales, but is rejected by Wendy Davies and Thomas Charles-Edwards as an attempt to extend the history of the diocese back to an implausibly early date. Cyfeilliog is included in this succession, but his bishopric covered a much smaller area, and the locations of land grants to him suggest that he was mainly active in Gwent. All those which can be securely located are near Caerwent in Gwent, suggesting that he may have been based in the town, and none of the charters relate to Glywysing (Glamorgan) or Llandaff.

The early tenth–century Anglo-Saxon Chronicle described Cyfeilliog as bishop of Archenfield, which was the English name for Ergyng. His diocese probably covered both Gwent and Ergyng. In this period, Ergyng was Welsh in language and custom, but under English rule, and he may have ministered to people there with the approval of the Bishop of Hereford.

== Charters ==
Charters preserved in the Book of Llandaff record grants to Cyfeilliog. The earliest charter is probably one dating to around 885: King Hywel ap Rhys of Glywysing gave Cyfeilliog two slaves and their progeny for the souls of his wife, sons and daughters. A witness called Asser attested this charter immediately after Cyfeilliog, a position of honour. The Asser who was the biographer of Alfred the Great spent a year ill in Caerwent at this time, and he may have attested the charter while temporarily attached to Cyfeilliog.

Cyfeilliog received grants of land in several charters from Brochfael ap Meurig, King of Gwent. In one he gave three modii (Note: A modius was equivalent to about 40 acres (16 hectares).) – about 120 acres (50 hectares) – of land with weirs on the Severn and the Meurig, a tributary of the Teifi, together with free landing rights and rights of shipwreck; and in another charter two churches, with six modii of land and free landing rights for ships at the mouth of the Troggy. Other donors included Hywel's son Arthfael, who in about 890 granted Villa Caer Birran, at Treberran, Pencoyd, with four modii of land to Cyfeilliog.

Cyfeilliog had several legal disputes with King Brochfael. In about 905, there was a disagreement between their households. Cyfeilliog was awarded an "insult price" "in puro auro" (in pure gold) of the worth of his face, lengthwise and breadthwise. The charter refers to his value in accordance with his status, under the ancient legal concept of wynepwerth ('honour', literally face-worth). Brochfael was unable to pay in gold and paid with six modii of land at Llanfihangel instead. Another dispute concerned a church with three modii of land which Brochfael gave to his daughter, described as "a holy virgin". In around 910, there was a dispute between Cyfeilliog and Brochfael over the church and its land, and judgement was again given in Cyfeilliog's favour and endorsed by Brochfael.

== Capture by the Vikings ==
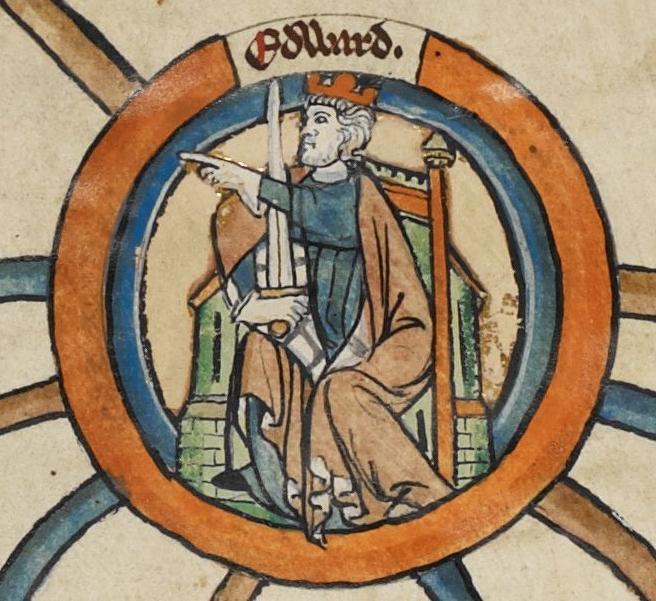
Portrait miniature from a thirteenth-century genealogical scroll depicting Edward the Elder

In 914, Cyfeilliog was captured by the Vikings, and the event was recorded in the Anglo-Saxon Chronicle:

In this year a great naval force came over here from the south from Brittany, and two earls, Ohter and Hroald, with them. And they then went west round the coast so that they arrived at the Severn Estuary and ravaged in Wales everywhere along the coast where it suited them. And they captured Cyfeilliog, bishop of Archenfield, and took him with them to the ships; and then King Edward ransomed him for 40 pounds [of silver]. (Note: The thirteenth-century chronicler John of Worcester wrote that Cyfeilliog was captured in Archenfield. Historians prefer the wording in the Anglo-Saxon Chronicle that Archenfield was the location of his diocese, but do not rule out John of Worcester's version.)

The payment of Cyfeilliog's ransom, described by Charles-Edwards as "a princely sum", by Alfred's son and successor Edward the Elder is regarded by historians as evidence that he maintained his father's lordship over south-east Wales.

== Death ==
Cyfeilliog died in 927 according to the Book of Llandaff. The date is accepted by Charles-Edwards, but Sims-Williams and Davies are sceptical because they regard the date as late for someone consecrated by Archbishop Æthelred, who died in 888. According to the Book of Llandaff, Cyfeilliog was succeeded by Libiau (also spelled Llibio and Llifio). The Canterbury consecration list says that Libiau was also consecrated by Æthelred, which may be a mistake, or Libiau may have had a different see from Cyfeilliog. Most local bishops in the eighth and ninth centuries appear to have been active in both Gwent and Ergyng, but Cyfeilliog's successors seem to have only ministered in Gwent. Bishops of Hereford and of Glasbury may have taken over in Ergyng.

== Bibliography ==
- Bannister, Arthur (1916). The Place-Names of Herefordshire: Their Origin and Development. Cambridge, UK: J. Clay. OCLC 252303893.
- Bartrum, Peter (1993). A Welsh Classical Dictionary: People in History and Legend up to about AD 1000. Aberystwyth, UK: The National Library of Wales. ISBN 978-0-90-715873-8.
- Breen, Aidan (2009). "Dubthach". Dictionary of Irish Biography. Royal Irish Academy. doi:10.3318/dib.002799.v1.
- Charles-Edwards, Thomas (2004). "Cyfeilliog (d. 927)". Oxford Dictionary of National Biography. Oxford University Press. doi:10.1093/ref:odnb/5420. ISBN 978-0-19-861412-8. (subscription, Wikipedia Library access or UK public library membership required)
- Charles-Edwards, Thomas (2013). Wales and the Britons 350–1064. Oxford, UK: Oxford University Press. ISBN 978-0-19-821731-2.
- Darlington, Reginald; McGurk, Patrick, eds. (1995). The Chronicle of John of Worcester (in Latin and English). Vol. 2. Oxford, UK: Clarendon Press. ISBN 978-0-19-822261-3.
- Davies, Wendy (1978). An Early Welsh Microcosm: Studies in the Llandaff Charters. London, UK: Royal Historical Society. ISBN 978-0-90-105033-5.
- Davies, Wendy (1979). The Llandaff Charters. Aberystwyth, UK: National Library of Wales. ISBN 978-0-90-183388-4.
- Keynes, Simon; Lapidge, Michael, eds. (1983). Alfred the Great: Asser's Life of King Alfred & Other Contemporary Sources. London, UK: Penguin Classics. ISBN 978-0-14-044409-4.
- Lloyd, John Edward (1939a). A History of Wales from the Earliest Times to the Edwardian Conquest. Vol. 1 (3rd ed.). London, UK: Longmans, Green & Co. OCLC 799460645.
- Lloyd, John Edward (1939b). A History of Wales from the Earliest Times to the Edwardian Conquest. Vol. 2 (3rd ed.). London, UK: Longmans, Green & Co. OCLC 799460645.
- McKee, Helen (Summer 2000a). "Scribes and Glosses from Dark Age Wales: The Cambridge Juvencus Manuscript". Cambrian Medieval Celtic Studies (39): 1–22. ISSN 1353-0089.
- McKee, Helen (2000b). The Cambridge Juvencus Manuscript Glossed in Latin, Old Welsh, and Old Irish: Text and Commentary. Aberystwyth, UK: CMCS Publications. ISBN 978-0-95-274782-6.
- Richards, Melville (1969). Welsh Administrative and Territorial Units. Cardiff, UK: University of Wales Press. ISBN 978-0-90-076808-8.
- Sims-Williams, Patrick (2019). The Book of Llandaf as a Historical Source. Woodbridge, UK: The Boydell Press. ISBN 978-1-78-327418-5.
- Wareham, Andrew (2004). "Æthelred (d. 888)". Oxford Dictionary of National Biography. Oxford University Press. doi:10.1093/ref:odnb/8914. (subscription, Wikipedia Library access or UK public library membership required)
- Whitelock, Dorothy, ed. (1979) [1st edition 1955]. English Historical Documents, Volume 1, c. 500–1042 (2nd ed.). London, UK: Routledge. ISBN 978-0-41-514366-0.
