= Meurig ab Arthfael =

King in south-east Wales (r. c. 848 to 874)

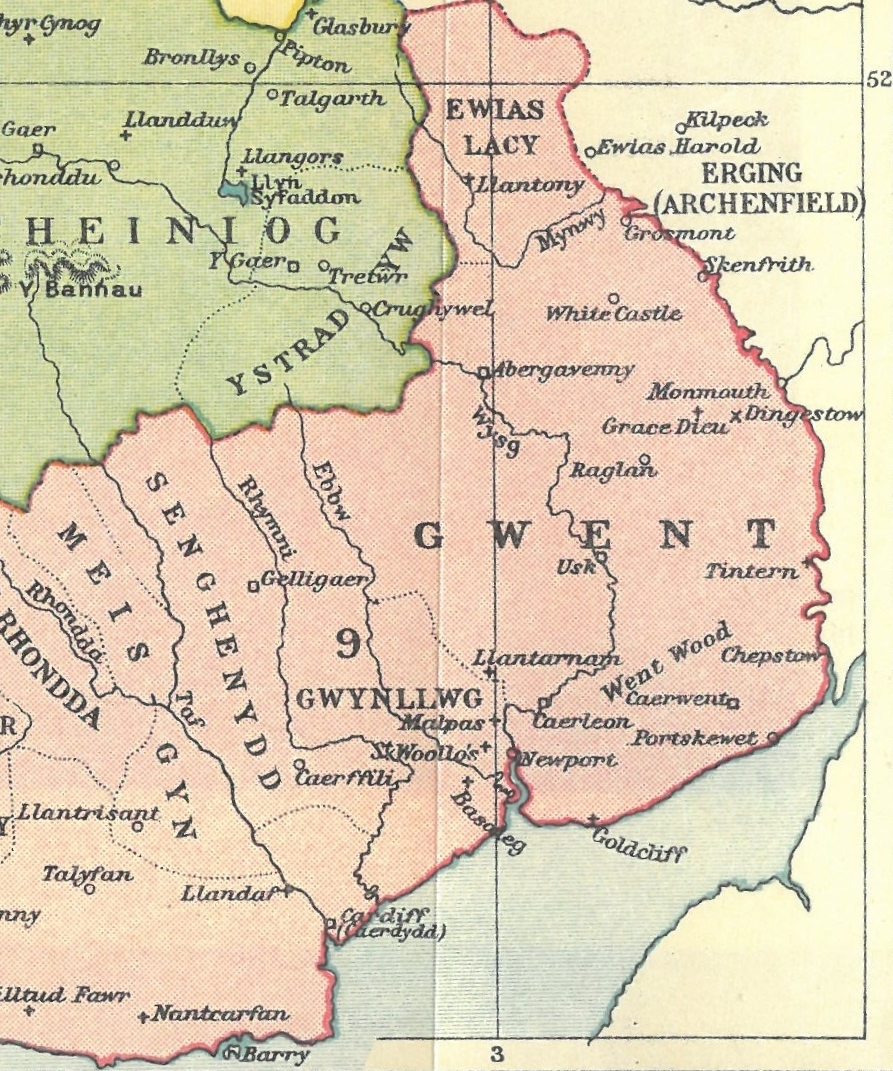
Map of medieval south-east Wales, fifth to thirteenth centuries. The number "9" west of Gwent is identified in the map legend as Morgannwg, which superseded Glywysing as the name for the kingdom at the end of the tenth century.

Meurig ab Arthfael (Note: The Welsh word for son is mab or map, which was commonly shortened to ab or ap. The middle words ap (before consonants) and ab (before vowels) in medieval Welsh names mean "son" [of a father called]. The rule is not always followed in records.) (Old Welsh: Mouric, ruled c. 848 – c. 874) was a king in south-east Wales. In the seventh century, Gwent was a single kingdom covering south-east Wales, but in the ninth century it was divided between Glywysing (now called Glamorgan), which had a higher status, and a smaller Gwent, covering the area which is now Monmouthshire. Historians disagree whether Meurig was king of Glywysing, with authority across south-east Wales, or only of Gwent. His sons Brochfael ap Meurig and Ffernfael ap Meurig were only kings of Gwent, and they were subject to their cousin Hywel ap Rhys, king of Glywysing.

The twelfth-century Book of Llandaff records charters in which Meurig granted land to bishops or guaranteed grants by others. Two charters state that he freed all churches from obligations to laymen, and in the view of the historian Wendy Davies, he was one of the few kings recorded in the charters who attempted to guarantee ecclesiastical immunity from widespread lawlessness and arbitrary use of power. Historians disagree when he died. Deaths of kings called Meurig are recorded in 849 and 874, and some historians date Meurig ab Arthfael's death definitively to 874, but others think that it is possible that he was the Meurig who died in 849.

== Background ==
The boundaries and names of Welsh kingdoms varied over time in the early medieval period. In the seventh century, south-east Wales was a single kingdom called Gwent, but historians of Wales do not agree on the situation in the ninth century, when some kings made grants in locations across the territory, while others were confined to the eastern part. Thomas Charles-Edwards thinks that the old Gwent was divided between Glywysing (later called Morgannwg or Glamorgan) in the west and a smaller Gwent (now Monmouthshire) in the east, with the ruler of Glywysing being an over-king. Wendy Davies argues that it is more likely that the old Gwent remained a single kingdom now called Glywysing, but she also mentions junior kings whose territory was confined to the smaller ninth-century Gwent. Patrick Sims-Williams thinks that either may be true, and that they "may amount to the same thing".

== Kingship ==
The main sources for King Meurig ab Arthfael are charters recorded in the twelfth-century Book of Llandaff. Much of this book is fraudulent, and until the late twentieth century most historians dismissed it as worthless, but since the work of Davies in the 1970s on the charters, they have been reappraised, and while some are judged to be forgeries, others are regarded as genuine in whole or part. However, the charters are undated; several Meurigs are mentioned, and it is not always clear which one is being referred to. Confirmation that Meurig ab Arthfael and his sons, Brochfael and Fernfael, ruled in the ninth century is provided by their notice in two independent sources. Asser in his biography of Alfred the Great of 893 mentions "Brochfael and Ffernfael (sons of Meurig and kings of Gwent)", and charter 199bii (Note: Charter numbers are as listed by Davies in The Llandaff Charters. This is the standard numbering system used in studies of the Llandaff charters.) is a grant by King Meurig, giving his sons' names as witnesses.

Davies dates Meurig's reign as c. 848 – c. 874. Almost nothing is known of kings in south-east Wales immediately before his time as his reign follows a gap in the Llandaff charters of some fifty years. His predecessor as king was probably his second cousin, Ithel ab Athrwys, who was killed in battle in 848 and was apparently the last of his line. According to a Harleian genealogy (an Old Welsh genealogy preserved in the Harleian Library), Meurig was a son of Arthfael ap Rhys.

Davies locates Meurig's grants across Glywysing and Gwent, and she and Charles-Edwards state that he ruled both territories as king of Glywysing. Charles-Edwards suggests that Meurig and his brother Rhys ab Arthfael probably ruled Glywysing successively. Sims-Williams dissents, arguing that in the only charter placing Meurig in Glywysing, his name was later interpolated, and that he had no power outside Gwent. Rhys ab Arthfael's son Hywel ap Rhys was king of Glywysing, and his cousins, Meurig's sons, had an inferior status as kings of Gwent.

== Charters ==
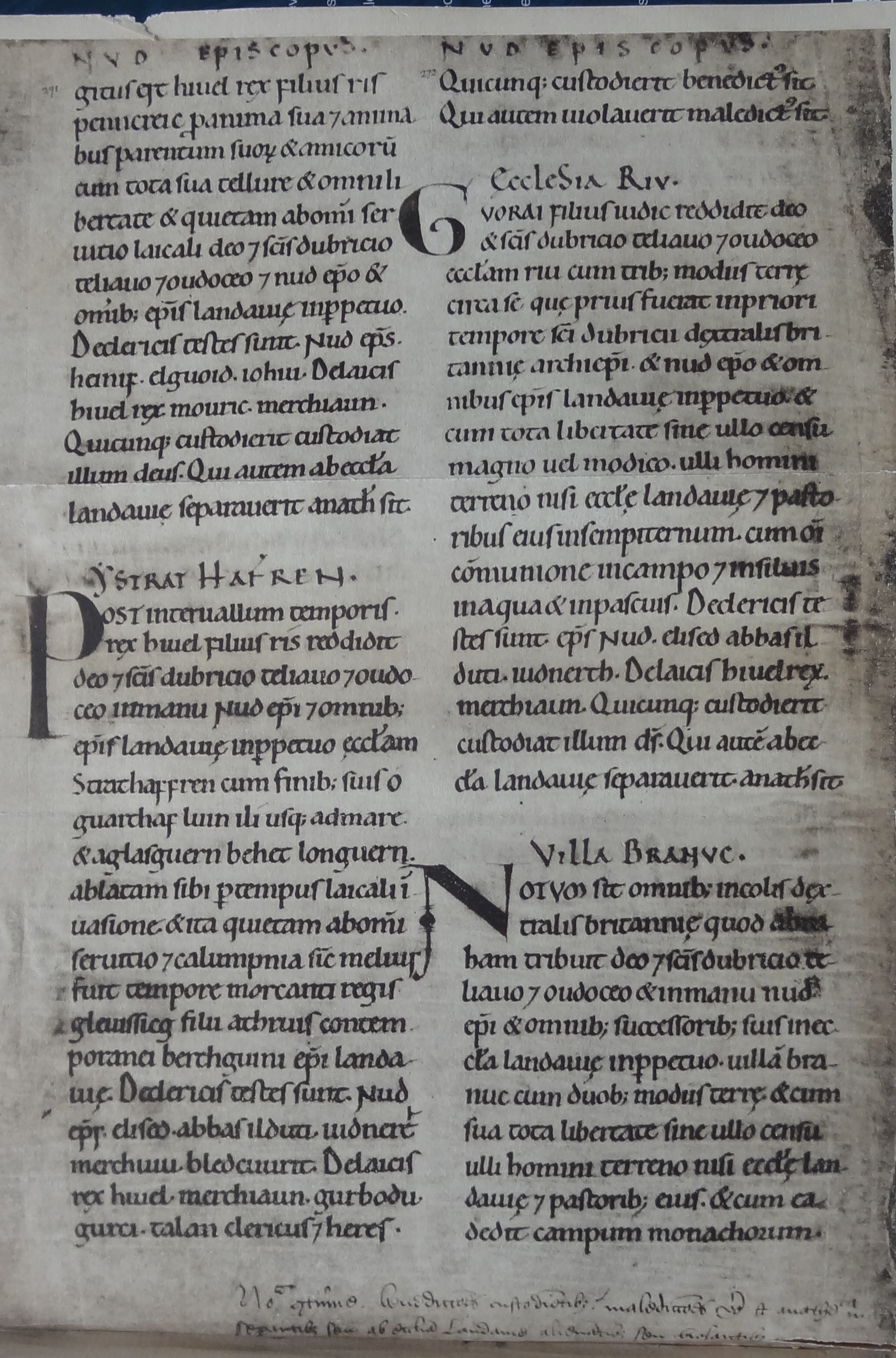
Folio from the Book of Llandaff. Charters recorded in the Book are the main source about Meurig.

Around 850, charters 169b and 170 state that Meurig ordered that all churches were to be released from obligations to laymen. Davies comments that the Llandaff charters give an "impression of lawlessness and of the arbitrary use of royal power by those who held it." In her view, Meurig is one of the few exceptions, as he seems to have attempted to free all ecclesiastical property from lay control, but he cannot have been wholly successful as kings continued to make grants transferring the ownership of churches in the tenth and eleventh centuries.

Medieval Welsh kings owned large landed estates, and grants by Meurig to bishops recorded in charters in the Book of Llandaff include one in 868 surrendering the church at Tryleg to Bishop Cerennyr. Several charters approved by Meurig record grants by laymen to ecclesiastics. Two dated to around 850 record grants to Bishop Grecielis with Meurig's guarantee. In charter 169b, Fauu gave Cilpedec (Kilpeck) church with its land, and in charter 170 Cuinncum returned Cum Mouric (perhaps Little Dewchurch) church to the bishop. In charter 74 dating to around 860, Meurig consented to a grant by Britcon and Iliwg of Lann Mocha (St Maughans) to Archbishop Dyfrig's church, but in another version (171b) of the charter Meurig guaranteed their grant of Lann Bocha to Bishop Grecielis, and it is not clear which version is genuine.

== Death ==
Deaths of kings called Meurig are recorded in the Annales Cambriae in 849 and 874, and historians of Wales do not agree which one was Meurig ab Arthfael. Charles-Edwards thinks that he may be the Meurig who died 849, but Bartrum states that his death is recorded in 874. Davies argues that "the claims of the relative chronology of the witness sequence are such as to suggest that Meurig ab Arthfael, the King Meurig of grants 169b-171b, 199bii (214?), 216b, 225 died in 874 rather than 849". Sims-Williams mentions both dates as alternatives.

A genealogy of Meurig's nephew, Hywel ap Rhys, lists Gwriad ap Brochfael as an ancestor, but in the view of the scholar of Welsh genealogy Peter Bartrum, this is probably an error, and Gwriad may have been a son of Brochfael ap Meurig and father of Nowy ap Gwriad, king of Gwent in the 950s. This theory is not accepted by other historians, who describe Nowy's descent as unknown. Davies states that the royal line descended from Meurig appears to have ended with Brochfael, who died in the early tenth century.

== Sources ==
- Bartrum, Peter (1993). A Welsh Classical Dictionary: People in History and Legend up to about A.D. 1000. Aberystwyth, UK: The National Library of Wales. ISBN 978-0-907158-73-8.
- Charles-Edwards, Thomas (2011). "Dynastic Succession in Early Medieval Wales". In Griffiths, R. A.; Schofield, P. R. (eds.). Wales and the Welsh in the Middle Ages. Cardiff, UK: University of Wales Press. pp. 70–88. ISBN 978-0-7083-2446-2.
- Charles-Edwards, Thomas (2013). Wales and the Britons 350–1064. Oxford, UK: Oxford University Press. ISBN 978-0-19-821731-2.
- Davies, Wendy (1978). An Early Welsh Microcosm: Studies in the Llandaff Charters. London, UK: Royal Historical Society. ISBN 978-0-901050-33-5.
- Davies, Wendy (1979). The Llandaff Charters. Aberystwyth, UK: National Library of Wales. ISBN 978-0-901833-88-4.
- Keynes, Simon; Lapidge, Michael, eds. (1983). Alfred the Great: Asser's Life of King Alfred & Other Contemporary Sources. London, UK: Penguin Classics. ISBN 978-0-14-044409-4.
- Lloyd, John Edward (1911). A History of Wales from the Earliest Times to the Edwardian Conquest. Vol. 2 (1st ed.). London, UK: Longmans, Green & Co. OCLC 1074958012.
- Rowlands, John; Rowlands, Sheila (1996). The Surnames of Wales. Baltimore, Maryland: Genealogical Publishing Company. ISBN 978-0-8063-1516-4.
- Siddons, Michael (2018). "Bartrum, Peter Clement (1907–2008), scholar of Welsh genealogy". Dictionary of Welsh Biography.
- Sims-Williams, Patrick (2019). The Book of Llandaff as a Historical Source. Woodbridge, UK: The Boydell Press. ISBN 978-1-78327-418-5.
