= Arthfael ap Rhys =

8th-century prince of Glywsing

Arthfael ap Rhys (son of Rhys) was a prince of Glywsing (modern Glamorgan) and Gwent in the late eighth century. He is dated by the genealogist Peter Bartrum to c. 760.

== Family ==
His father was called Rhys, and his mother was probably Ceingar ferch Maredudd ap Tewdws of Dyfed. His wife was Brawstudd ferch Gloud ap Pasgen Buellt. According to Bartrum, Arthfael had two sons, "Meurig of the line of Gwent" and "Rhys of the line of Glywsing". Two late ninth-century brothers had a father called Arthfael. Rhys ap Arthfael was the father of Hywel ap Rhys (died 886), king of Glywsing, and Meurig ab Arthfael was the father of Brochfael ap Meurig and Ffernfael ap Meurig, joint kings of Gwent (fl. 880s). The names and locations suggest that the kings of Glywsing and Gwent were descended from Arthfael ap Rhys. The historian Thomas Charles-Edwards gives Arthfael's father's name as Rhys and says that Meurig may have died in 849, whereas Wendy Davies states that Meurig ab Arthfael ruled until 874 and does not give Arthfael's patronym. The three scholars appear to be discussing the same Arthfael, and the explanation for the discrepancies in dates is unclear.

== Sources ==
- Bartrum, Peter (1993). A Welsh Classical Dictionary: People in History and Legend up to about A. D 1000. Aberystwyth, UK: The National Library of Wales. ISBN 978-0-907158-73-8.
- Charles-Edwards, Thomas (2011). "Dynastic Succession in Early Medieval Wales". In Griffiths, R. A.; Schofield, P. R. (eds.). Wales and the Welsh in the Middle Ages. Cardiff, UK: University of Wales Press. pp. 70–88. ISBN 978-0-7083-2446-2.
- Davies, Wendy (1979). The Llandaff Charters. Aberystwyth, UK: National Library of Wales. ISBN 978-0-901833-88-4.
- Keynes, Simon; Lapidge, Michael, eds. (1983). Alfred the Great: Asser's Life of King Alfred & Other Contemporary Sources. London, UK: Penguin Classics. ISBN 978-0-14-044409-4.
