= Brochfael ap Meurig =

King of Gwent in Wales (r. c. 872 – c. 910)

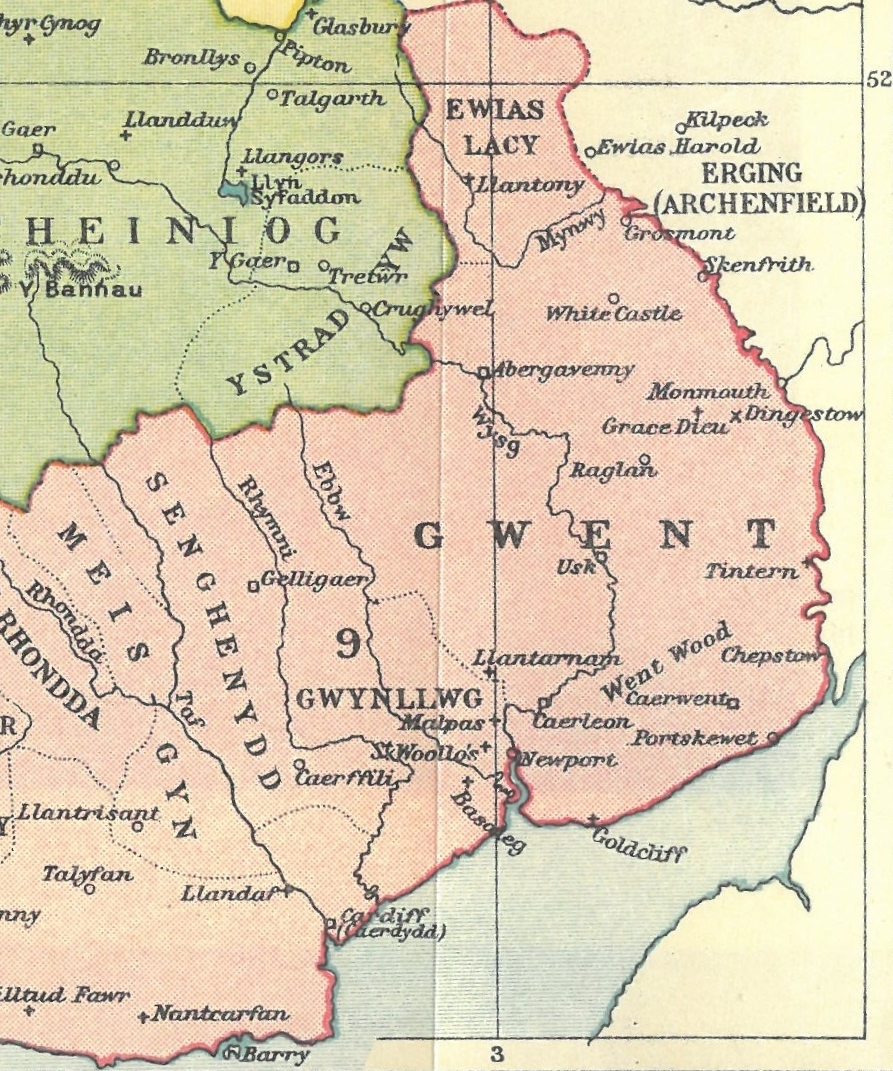
Map of medieval south-east Wales, fifth to thirteenth centuries. The number "9" west of Gwent is listed in the map legend as Morgannwg, which superseded Glywysing as the name for the kingdom at the end of the tenth century.

Brochfael ap Meurig (Note: His name is also shown as Brochmail, Brochwel, Brochmael, Brocmail and Brochuail: The middle words "ap" (before consonants) and "ab" (before vowels) in medieval Welsh names mean "son of".) (ruled c. 872 – c. 910) was king of Gwent in south-east Wales. He ruled jointly with his brother, Ffernfael ap Meurig. Gwent and Glywysing, the neighbouring territory to the west, were ruled as a single kingdom in some periods; at other times they were separate and the king of Glywysing had the higher status. Brochfael's father, Meurig ab Arthfael, ruled both territories with the title King of Glywysing, but Brochfael and Ffernfael were only kings of Gwent, and had a lower status than their cousin Hywel ap Rhys, King of Glywysing.

The Anglo-Saxon kingdom of Mercia claimed dominion over most of Wales. However, in the late 880s Brochfael, Ffernfael and Hywel submitted voluntarily to Alfred the Great, King of Wessex, in order to gain protection from the oppression of Æthelred, Lord of the Mercians. A number of Brochfael's charters survive, mainly grants to Bishop Cyfeilliog and settlements of Brochfael's disputes with the bishop. Brochfael was the last of his line and was succeeded by Hywel's son, Owain ap Hywel.

== Background ==
The boundaries and names of Welsh kingdoms varied over time in the early medieval period. In the seventh century, south-east Wales was a single kingdom called Gwent, but by the ninth century it had been divided between Glywysing (later Morgannwg and Glamorgan) in the west and Gwent in the east, with the king of Glywysing having the higher status. From the early ninth century, Mercia, the Anglo-Saxon kingdom on the eastern Welsh border, claimed hegemony over most of Wales.

In 878, King Alfred the Great of Wessex defeated the Vikings at the Battle of Edington and around the same time King Ceolwulf of Mercia defeated and killed Rhodri Mawr (Rhodri the Great), the powerful king of the north Welsh Kingdom of Gwynedd. Rhodri's sons soon recovered their father's power. In 881 they defeated Ceolwulf's successor as ruler of Mercia, Æthelred, Lord of the Mercians, at the Battle of the Conwy. This victory was described in Welsh annals as "revenge by God for Rhodri".

== Family ==
Brochfael acceded to the throne of Gwent around 872. He and his brother Ffernfael ap Meurig were sons of Meurig ab Arthfael. Historians of Wales do not agree on Meurig ab Arthfael's death date. Thomas Charles-Edwards thinks that he may be the Meurig whose death is recorded in the Annales Cambriae under 849, but Wendy Davies argues that 874 is more likely and dates his reign as c. 848 – c. 874 or c. 850 – c. 870.

In early medieval Wales, it was common for brothers to share the kingship, and in his Life of King Alfred, written in 893, the Welsh monk Asser describes Brochfael and Ffernfael as kings of Gwent. They are both listed in the twelfth-century Book of Llandaff as witnesses to charters together with their father, but Ffernfael does not have any surviving charters of his own, whereas several show Brochfael as a royal grantor and witness, so Ffernfael may have been subordinate to Brochfael.

== Territory ==
Brochfael and Ffernfael were joint kings of Gwent, and their cousin Hywel ap Rhys was king of Glywysing. The kingship of Glywysing had a superior status, and Hywel was probably an over-king allowing his cousins to rule Gwent. He gave more grants in Gwent than in Glywysing, whereas Brochfael's grants were confined to Gwent. In the previous generation, Davies (followed by Charles-Edwards) states that Brochfael's father Meurig ab Arthfael gave grants in both territories, and that he ruled them both as king of Glywysing. The historian Patrick Sims-Williams dissents, arguing that the charters placing Meurig in Glywysing were forged, and that he had no power outside Gwent.

== Kingship ==
Æthelred's defeat at the Battle of the Conwy in 881 ended Mercian domination of north and west Wales, but he violently tried to maintain his rule over the south-east. Alfred the Great, King of the West Saxons, became the competitor of Mercia for the allegiance of the south-eastern Welsh kings, and Æthelred's oppression drove them to voluntarily submit to Alfred and seek his protection. Æthelred himself soon followed in abandoning the attempt to maintain his independence and submitted to the West Saxon king.

In his Life of King Alfred, Asser listed Brochfael among Welsh kings who submitted to King Alfred:

At that time [late 880s], and for a considerable time before then, all the districts of right-hand [southern] Wales belonged to King Alfred, and still do. That is to say, Hyfaidd, with all the inhabitants of the kingdom of Dyfed, driven by the might of the six sons of Rhodri [Mawr], had submitted himself to King Alfred's royal overlordship. Likewise, Hywel ap Rhys (the king of Glywysing) and Brochfael and Ffernfael (sons of Meurig and kings of Gwent), driven by the might and tyrannical behaviour of Ealdorman Æthelred and the Mercians, petitioned King Alfred of their own accord, in order to obtain lordship and protection from him in the face of their enemies.

== Charters ==
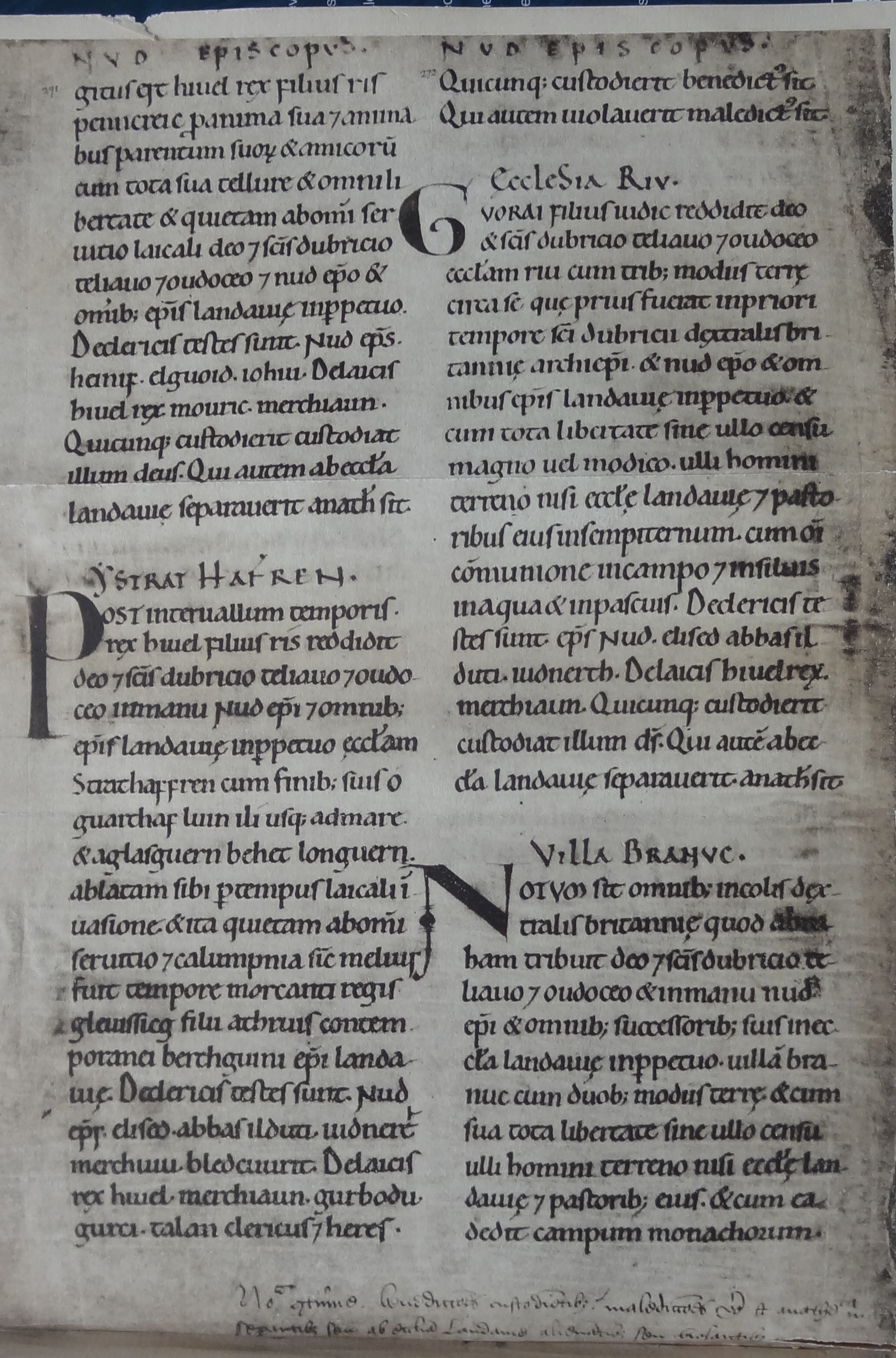
Folio from the Book of Llandaff

Charters in the Book of Llandaff show Brochfael in his early years witnessing his father's charters, and later making grants as king. In about 868, King Meurig surrendered the church at Tryleg and returned it to Bishop Cerennyr in the presence of Brochfael and Ffernfael. Like other Welsh kings, Brochfael had large landed estates, and he made several grants to Bishop Cyfeilliog of land and fishing rights on the coast of the Severn Estuary. Grants to Cyfeilliog between the 890s and 920s were all of land in Gwent, and Brochfael was the main grantor.

Charters also record Brochfael's disputes with Cyfeilliog. One disagreement concerned a church with three modii (about 120 acres or 50 hectares) of land which Brochfael gave to his daughter, described as "a holy virgin", to support her in her religious life. When she died around 910, Brochfael attempted to recover his donation, but Cyfeilliog claimed the property and judgement was given in his favour and endorsed by Brochfael. The historian Lester Little comments that this episode saw Brochfael "in a relatively docile mood". Earlier, in about 905, there was a disagreement between Brochfael's familia (household) and Cyfeilliog's. Brochfael insulted Cyfeilliog, who threatened to excommunicate him and his family. Once again, Brochfael backed down and apologised. Cyfeilliog was awarded an "insult price" in puro auro (in pure gold) of the worth of his face, lengthwise and breadthwise. Brochfael was unable to pay in gold and instead paid with six modii (about 240 acres or 100 hectares) of land at Llanfihangel.

== Death ==
Brochfael died in the early tenth century; the exact date is unknown. Davies dates the end of his rule as c. 910, and Charles-Edwards thinks that Glywysing and Gwent were probably ruled as a single kingdom by Hywel's son Owain ap Hywel by 918. Manuscript D of the Anglo-Saxon Chronicle, in a section probably compiled in the 1050s, states that in 927, Owain, king of the people of Gwent, was one of the British rulers who submitted to Æthelstan, King of England. Davies states that the royal line descended from Meurig ended with Brochfael. (Note: Gwriad ap Brochfael is listed in a genealogy of Hywel ap Rhys, but in the view of the genealogist Peter Bartrum this is an error and he may have been a son of Brochfael ap Meurig and father of Noë ap Gwriad, king of Gwent in the 950s. In that case, Davies' statement that Brochfael was the last of his line would be incorrect.)

== Bibliography ==
- Bartrum, Peter (1993). A Welsh Classical Dictionary: People in History and Legend up to about A. D 1000. Aberystwyth, UK: The National Library of Wales. ISBN 978-0-907158-73-8.
- Charles-Edwards, Thomas (2004). "Cyfeilliog (d. 927)". Oxford Dictionary of National Biography. Oxford University Press. doi:10.1093/ref:odnb/5420. ISBN 978-0-19-861412-8. (subscription, Wikipedia Library access or UK public library membership required)
- Charles-Edwards, Thomas (2011). "Dynastic Succession in Early Medieval Wales". In Griffiths, R. A.; Schofield, P. R. (eds.). Wales and the Welsh in the Middle Ages. Cardiff, UK: University of Wales Press. pp. 70–88. ISBN 978-0-7083-2446-2.
- Charles-Edwards, Thomas (2013). Wales and the Britons 350–1064. Oxford, UK: Oxford University Press. ISBN 978-0-19-821731-2.
- Cubbin, G. P., ed. (1996). The Anglo-Saxon Chronicle, A Collaborative Edition, 6, MS D. Cambridge, UK: D. S. Brewer. ISBN 978-0-85991-467-3.
- Davies, Wendy (1978). An Early Welsh Microcosm: Studies in the Llandaff Charters. London, UK: Royal Historical Society. ISBN 978-0-901050-33-5.
- Davies, Wendy (1979). The Llandaff Charters. Aberystwyth, UK: National Library of Wales. ISBN 978-0-901833-88-4.
- Edwards, Nancy (2023). Life in Early Medieval Wales. Oxford, UK: Oxford University Press. ISBN 978-0-19-873321-8.
- Evans, John Gwenoguryn; Rhys, John, eds. (1893). The Text of the Book of Llan Dâv (in Latin). Oxford, UK: J. Gwenoguryn Evans. OCLC 632938065.
- Haddan, Arthur; Stubbs, William, eds. (1869). Councils and Ecclesiastical Documents Relating to Great Britain and Ireland (in Latin). Vol. I. Oxford, UK: Clarendon Press. OCLC 1046288968.
- Keynes, Simon; Lapidge, Michael, eds. (1983). Alfred the Great: Asser's Life of King Alfred & Other Contemporary Sources. London, UK: Penguin Classics. ISBN 978-0-14-044409-4.
- Little, Lester (1991). "Spiritual Sanctions in Wales". In Timea, Szell; Blumenfeld-Kosinski, Renate (eds.). Images of Sainthood in Medieval Europe. Ithaca, NY: Cornell University Press. pp. 67–80. ISBN 978-0-8014-2507-3.
- Lloyd, John Edward (1911). A History of Wales from the Earliest Times to the Edwardian Conquest. Vol. 2 (1st ed.). London, UK: Longmans, Green & Co. OCLC 1074958012.
- Moore, Donald (April 1990). "The Indexing of Welsh Person Names". The Indexer. 17 (1): 12–20. doi:10.3828/indexer.1990.17.1.6. ISSN 0019-4131.
- Sims-Williams, Patrick (2019). The Book of Llandaff as a Historical Source. Woodbridge, UK: The Boydell Press. ISBN 978-1-78327-418-5.
- Whitelock, Dorothy, ed. (1979). English Historical Documents, Volume 1, c. 500–1042 (2nd ed.). London, UK: Routledge. ISBN 978-0-415-14366-0.
