= Archæologia Britannica =

Pioneering study of the Celtic languages by Edward Lhuyd

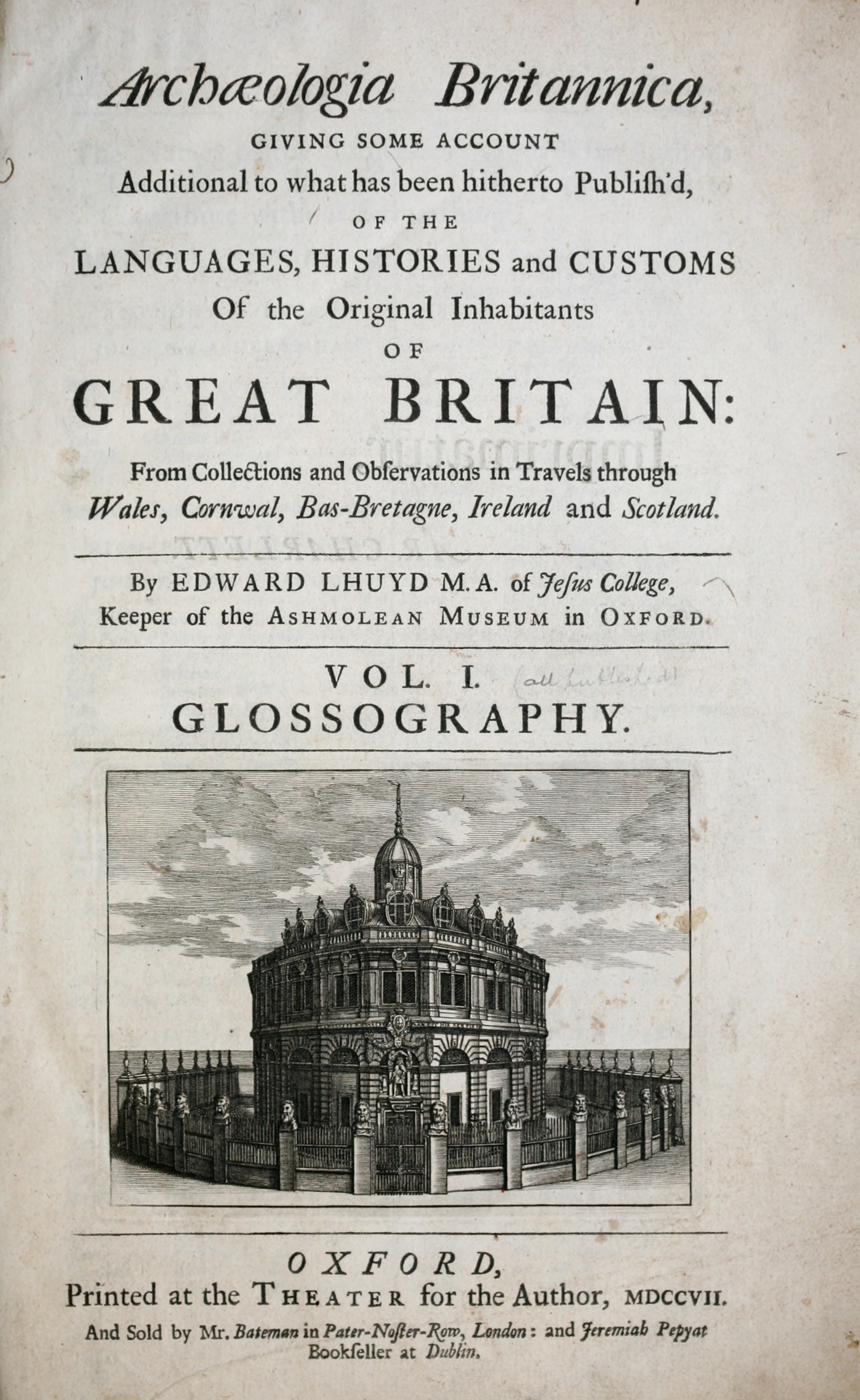
- Title page of Archæologia Britannica Volume I 'Glossography' (1707)
- Author: Edward Lhuyd
- Language: English, Welsh, Cornish, Breton, Irish, Scottish Gaelic, Manx, Gaulish, Latin, Greek
- Subject: Celtic languages, linguistics, philology,
- Publisher: Oxford University Press
- Publication date: 1707
- Pages: 436

Archæologia Britannica (from Latin: Antiquities of Britain), the first volume of which was published in 1707, is a pioneering study of the Celtic languages written by Edward Lhuyd.

Following an extensive tour of Great Britain and Ireland lasting more than four years, Lhuyd began work on Glossography, the first volume of a planned four-volume set, Archæologia Britannica, which combined innovative methods of historical linguistics, language comparison, and field research, to establish a genetic relationship between the Welsh, Cornish, Breton, Irish, Scottish Gaelic, and Gaulish languages. After a significant delay, the Glossography was finally published in 1707.

Due to Lhuyd's early death at the age of 49, the last three volumes were never completed, and many of Lhuyd's manuscripts and research notes were later lost, destroyed in two separate fires. As the only completed volume, the Glossography itself is often referred to as Archæologia Britannica.

== Summary ==
Lhuyd's basic argument in Glossography is that languages develop from a parent language by various processes of linguistic change, such as transposition of sounds or syllables, acquisition of loanwords, mispronunciation, and use of different prefixes or suffixes. For example, he notes that sounds in one language may correspond to a different sound in another language, so for instance [k] in Greek, Latin, Welsh, and Irish is changed into [h] in the 'Teutonic' (i.e. Germanic) languages.

Lhuyd understood that different orthographic conventions in different languages may hinder comparison, and introduces a General Alphabet to facilitate direct comparison between languages. His methodology allows a systematic study of etymology, including a focus on regular sound changes, equivalence or similarity of meaning of cognates, and shared morphology, and emphasises that the basis of comparison should be the most basic parts of a language's core vocabulary.

Lhuyd realized that the Welsh, Cornish, Breton, Irish, Scottish Gaelic, and Gaulish languages were closely related to each other, provided a number of phonetic correspondences that define the relationship between them, and proposed a genetic relationship between the Goidelic and Brittonic languages. Building on the earlier work of George Buchanan and Paul-Yves Pezron, he categorized these languages as a Celtic language family sharing a common origin.

Lhuyd attempts to explain the linguistic differences in the Celtic languages using a model where Goidelic (or Q-Celtic) languages are first introduced to Britain and Ireland from Gaul, followed by a second, later migration, also from Gaul, of Brittonic (or P-Celtic) speakers, a model that Barry Cunliffe describes as being "broadly accepted and discussed by historical philologists over the last 300 years."

== Background ==
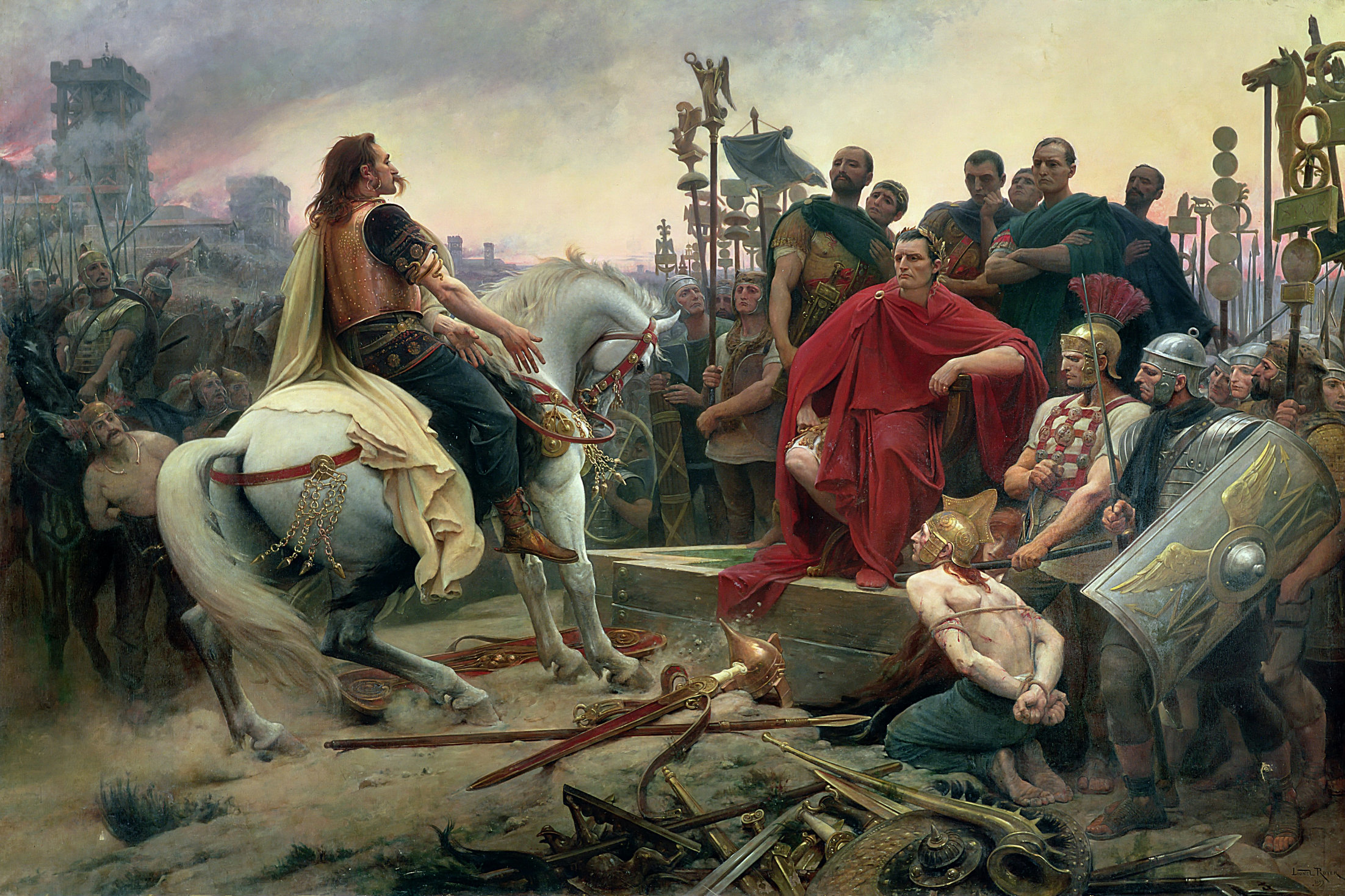
'Vercingetorix Throws Down his Arms at the Feet of Julius Caesar' by Lionel Royer. Caesar writes that the Gauls called themselves 'Celtae'

In the fifteenth and sixteenth centuries, the identity of the Greek Keltoi, and Latin Celtae and Galli, were discussed by scholars, with various national groups claiming descent from the ancient 'Celts' of antiquity, with no modern understanding of Celts as a linguistic group related to speakers of Brittonic or Goidelic languages. By the end of the sixteenth century, European intellectuals had begun to seriously debate whether Welsh and Irish, for example, were related languages. Scaliger had argued in the 1590s that these languages were unrelated. George Buchanan, on the other hand, had previously argued on philological grounds that the ancient Britons were Gaulish, and that Gaelic was also related to Gaulish, and he is often regarded as the first to recognize these languages as Celtic in the modern sense. Although several seventeenth-century writers supported this idea, the debate had not been conclusively resolved by the end of the seventeenth century.

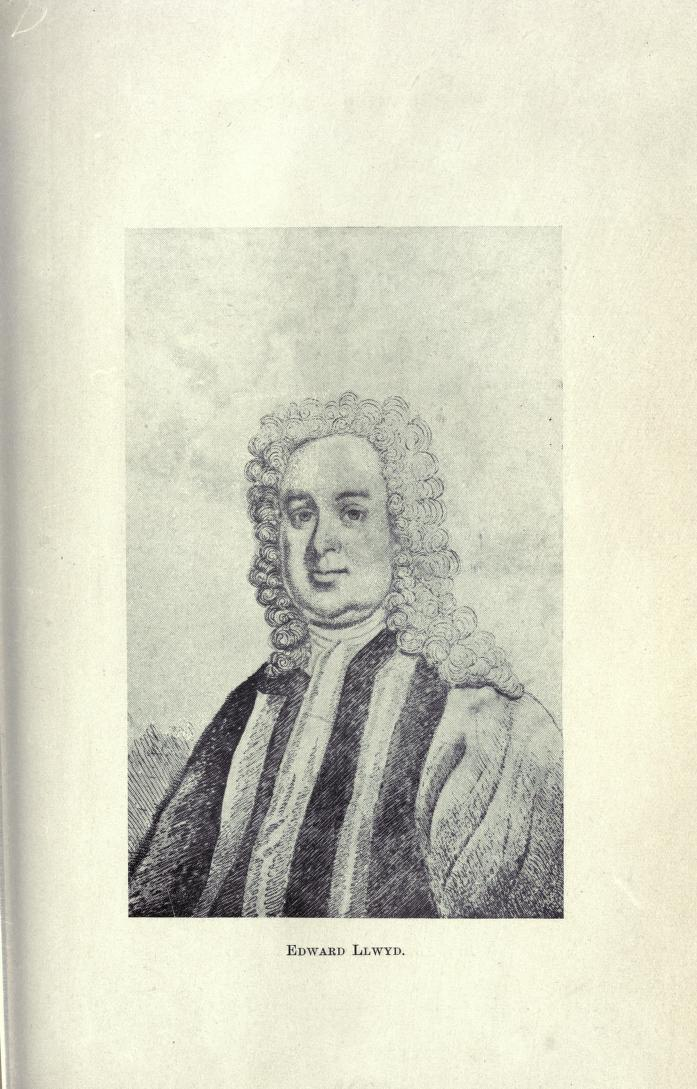
Drawing of Lhuyd c. 1709

In 1693, Edward Lhuyd, an antiquarian, naturalist, botanist, geographer, and philologist, and recently appointed Keeper of the Ashmolean Museum at the University of Oxford, was invited to contribute to the Welsh sections of William Camden's Brittania, a survey of Great Britain and Ireland. His work on this revision motivated him to begin his own magnum opus, Archæologia Britannica, an envisaged comparative study of the shared characteristics of the languages, archaeology, and culture of Wales, Cornwall, Brittany, Scotland, and Ireland.

Following the publication of Britannia in 1695, Lhuyd published A Design of a British Dictionary, Historical & Geographical: with an Essay entitl'd Archæologia Britannica, seeking subscribers to fund the research, fieldwork, and eventual publication of what was initially conceived as a multi-volume work, Archæologia Britannica or An Account of the Ancient Languages, Customs, and Monuments of the British Isles. Following the successful publication of the Design, Lhuyd printed a questionnaire, Parochial Queries, three copies of which were distributed to every parish in Wales, providing Lhuyd with preliminary data with which to plan his fieldwork. The questionnaire asks for various types of information, including plants, minerals, stones, birds, quadrupeds, and the weather.

== Tour of Celtic countries ==
With his assistants Robert Wynne, William Jones, and David Parry, Lhuyd began his "great tour", lasting from 1697 to 1701. Lhuyd and his companions travelled Britain and Ireland for four years, studying and collecting manuscripts, ancient artefacts, and fossils, describing architecture and monuments, and recording local culture and spoken languages. The four-year long tour has been described as "made under the most difficult conditions of travel, and at great cost to [Lhuyd's] health and well-being."

Lhuyd's methodology included collection of primary data from native speakers, such as asking speakers to translate terms into their native languages.

=== North Wales (1696) ===
Lhuyd here initially conducted research from April to October of this year. Initial funding from subscribers allowed Lhuyd to go on a six-month tour. In June, Lhuyd met with Richard Richardson, with whom he studied botany in Snowdonia. Lhuyd also studied manuscripts at Bangor and Hengwrt, and visited eight or nine counties in total.

=== Wales (1697–1699) ===
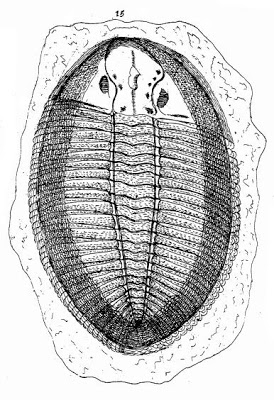
Lhuyd's etching of the trilobite Ogygiocarella debuchii, found by him near Llandeilo in 1698. Lhuyd believed it to be a "Sceleton of some flat Fish."

Having trained others to take on his duties at Oxford and collected some funding, Lhuyd, along with his three assistants, began his tour in May 1697, travelling through Gloucestershire and the Forest of Dean, and reaching Chepstow on 13 May.

After three months, Lhuyd arrived at Cowbridge, where he spent two months copying a manuscript. Lhuyd spent a total of one year in south Wales, then travelled to Cardigan, then to Hereford in August 1698. Lhuyd obtained a Welsh-Latin dictionary and hunted fossils while in Wales.

On account of their research activities during their travels in Wales, Lhuyd and his assistants were suspected of being Jacobite spies, conjurers, or tax collectors by suspicious locals. Despite this, Robert Gunther states that his numerous connections in Wales made him a "welcome enquirer everywhere."

=== Ireland and Scotland (1699–1700) ===
From Wales, Lhuyd and his team reached Ireland in July or August 1699, landing in Dublin, then travelled to Antrim and visited Newgrange and the Giant's Causeway. They then took the ferry to Scotland in late September or October, before returning to northern Ireland by boat in January 1700, visiting Ulster, Connaught, and Munster, arriving in Killarney in July.

In the Scottish Highlands, Lhuyd recorded "the Highland Tongue" (Scottish Gaelic) from native speakers, and also describes some small ancient glass charms he found. Lhuyd remarks in a letter that he learned very little Irish from the natives, learning most of that language from books.

According to Lhuyd, he was obliged to leave Ireland sooner than intended because of the "Tories of Kil-Arni."

=== Cornwall (1700–1701) ===
Probably directly from Ireland, or perhaps via Wales, Lhuyd arrived in Cornwall in August 1700. In Cornwall, Lhuyd was able to gather information about the Cornish language by listening to native speakers, especially the parish of St. Just, from local antiquarians such as Nicholas Boson and John Keigwin, and from three manuscripts he was able to study, Pascon agan Arluth, the Ordinalia, and Gwreans an Bys. Lhuyd's team also produced sketches and plans of antiquities and ancient monuments, including Boskednan stone circle and Chûn Castle.

According to Thomas Tonkin's account, Lhuyd and his assistants were arrested as suspected thieves, and brought in front of a justice of the peace, who then released them. Lhuyd and his team visited many places in Cornwall, including Penzance, Lambriggan, and Falmouth.

John Keigwin's reaction to Lhuyd's arrival in Mousehole is satirized in Alan Kent's Anglo-Cornish dialect play, Dreaming in Cornish:

Still, on his head he wore his periwig, even though it looked more like a geat gannet's nest than the attire of a gennelman. His face itself was prop'ly drawn, with his mouth screwed up like a duck's fert. So this was of 'un - Edward Lhuyd – a man who, despite being without drawing room and closet, looked like he had grabbed hold o' the world by the ass'ole.

=== Brittany (1701) ===
From Falmouth, Lhuyd arrived in Saint-Malo, Brittany in January 1701. Here, Lhuyd was able to procure two seventeen-century Breton dictionaries, one of which he could only obtain in exchange for his own copy of Davies' dictionary.

In Brittany, Lhuyd and his companions were jailed on suspicion of being English spies. According to Lhuyd, after arousing the suspicion of locals, his letters and documents were seized, his pockets searched, and he was imprisoned at Brest Castle for 18 days. After authorities found nothing treasonous in the seized documents, they were released, but then forced to leave the kingdom, as war "was already declar'd against the Empire, the Dutch, and the English." He eventually returned to England in March.

=== Itinerary ===
Date	Location
1697
May	Forest of Dean
13 May	Chepstow
15 June	Usk
18 July	St. George, near Cardiff
22 July	St. Nicolas
10 August	Cowbridge
22 September	Lhan Dyvodwg
25 September	Cowbridge
20 October	Swansea
20 November	Carmarthen
20 December	Llandeilo
1698
4 January	Tenby
19 February	Scochburgh, near Tenby
26 March	Caldey Island
2 April	Scochburgh, near Tenby
1 May	Scochburgh
20 May	Pembroke
21 May	Haverfordwest
19 June	Narberth
28 June	Llan Bedr
6 July	Cardigan
3 August	Hereford
19 September	Hay in Brecon
18 October	Newtown
26 October	Montgomery town
22 November	Gwersyllt
28 November	Llanfyllin
23 December	Dolgelheu
1699
2 January	Gwersyllt
18 January	Dolgelheu
4 April	Dolgelheu
18 April	Gogerdhan
25 May	Tal y Cavan
26 June	Flint
June	Conway
1 August	Beaumaris
August	Dublin
15 December	Bathgate, near Linlithgow
1700
1 February	Londonderry
12 March	Sligo
April	Wales
25 August	Penzance
27 August	Lambrigan
15 October	St. Ives
3 November	Plymouth
29 November	Falmouth
1701
14 January	St. Malo
January	Morlaix
February	Brest
March	Poole
10 March	Oxford

== Proposed volumes ==
As originally conceived in Design, Lhuyd intended Archæologia Britannica to be divided into four volumes:

- Volume I: "A comparison of the modern Welsh with other European languages", particularly Greek, Latin, Irish, Cornish, and Armorican (Breton).
- Volume II: A comparison of the customs and traditions of the Britons with those of other nations. According to the Welsh preface of volume I, this was intended to be a "Dictionary of ye history of ye Kings, Princes, Ancient nobility, ye Towns, Castles Churches and Saints and of all other very remarkable men and places, of ye British nation, mention'd in ancient records"
- Volume III: "An account of all such monuments now remaining in Wales as are presumed to be British; and either older or not much later than the Roman Conquest."
- Volume IV: "An Account of the Roman antiquities there and others of later Date, during the Government of the British Princes; together with Copies of all the Inscriptions of any considerable Antiquity."

On account of Lhuyd’s early death, only the first volume, Glossography, was eventually published.

== Publication ==
Glossography was completed in November 1703, at which time it was delivered to the printer. It was not published until 1707, however, due to a lack of suitable movable type for the complex orthography used in the volume, which consisted of an extended Latin alphabet combined with a variety of diacritics, meaning only one compositor could perform the task.

== Contents ==
=== The names of the subscribers towards the author's travels; as also of those who were pleased to contribute without subscribing ===
Lhuyd lists here subscribers and financial contributors, mostly clergy, lawyers, physicians, clerics, and gentry. In addition to providing financial support, Lhuyd's subscribers had also been encouraged to contribute research material.

=== To the right honourable Sr Thomas Mansel of Margam ===
Lhuyd describes the incompleteness of the work, his fatigue after five years' travels, and his experiences gathering information for AB. He expresses his hope that the book will provide a clearer understanding of the ancient languages of Britain and Ireland, and thanks Mansel for his generosity and promotion of scholarship in general.

=== Preface ===
In the English language preface, Lhuyd explains his motivation for publishing the Glossography before the other volumes, and summarizes the contents. This chapter also contains prose and poetry in praise of the volume in Welsh, Irish, and Latin by other scholars.

=== At y Kymry ===
In this chapter, a Welsh-language preface, Lhuyd writes that, after writing Irish and Cornish prefaces, he feels obliged to address the Welsh in "our mother tongue". Lhuyd mentions his unusual orthography, stating that, as others are free to choose their own orthography, so he asks the same freedom to use his, pointing out the benefits of being able to transcribe multiple languages in a single spelling system, using single letters for each sound, and compatibility with old manuscripts.

Lhuyd then apologises for the time it has taken to produce the first volume, stating that he did not initially intend to travel for so long or in so much detail, or to write such a large essay.

Lhuyd outlines his migration model for the Celtic settlement of Britain:

Having now related what none have hitherto made mention of, namely, first that the old inhabitants of Ireland consisted of two nations, Gwydhelians and Scots. Secondly, that the Gwydhelians descended from the ancient Britons, and the Scots from Spain. Thirdly, that the Gwydhelians lived in the most ancient times not only in north Britain...but also in England and Wales. And fourthly that the said Gwydhelians of England and Wales were the inhabitants of Gaul before they came into this island.

=== Title I: Comparative etymology. Or remarks on the alteration of languages ===
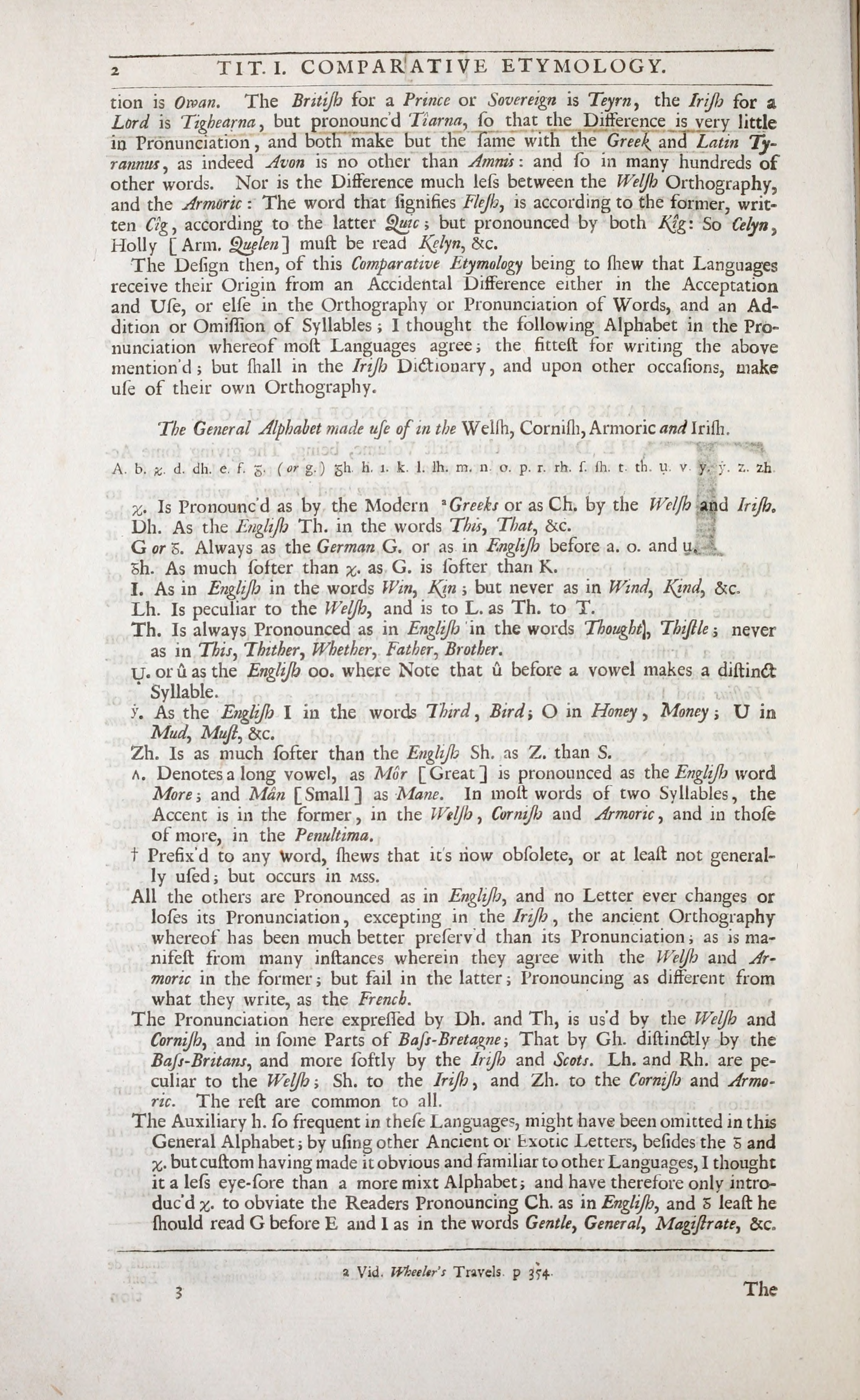
Page from Title I, showing Lhuyd's "General Alphabet"

This title examines lexical and phonological correspondences in different languages, as well as semantic changes. In total this title consists of 24 linguistic observations, which Lhuyd later divides into 10 classes in a "summary of etymology". Lhuyd attaches special emphasis to this part of the volume, and accordingly places it at the beginning of the work.

He explains that it "consists wholly of Parallel Observations relating to the Origin of Dialects, the affinity of the British with other languages, and their correspondence to one another. What I aim'd at therein, was the shewing by a collection of examples methodized, that etymology is not, as a great many, till they have considered it with some application, are apt to be perswaded, a speculation merely groundless or conjectural."

Class I

Synopsis:

Words of the same Origin as to Sound or Pronunciation, but deviating in the sense...I use the word Deviating rather than Different or Distinct, because it implies, that in such words; same Affinity is still retain'd; and in Etymology, either an Identity or Analogy of signification, is always requir'd.

In "Observation I", for instance, he gives dụrn as an example, meaning 'fist' in Welsh and Irish, but 'hand' in Cornish and Breton.

Class II

Synopsis:

Words Obsolete in some Dialects, Retain'd in others...An Etymologist ought to be well acquainted with the Obsolete words of the Language he is to explain, as being nearer the FountainHead; and diverse such, besides what occurr in old Manuscripts, are preserv'd in particular Countreys, tho' not admitted into Dictionaries, and for that reason Vocabularies of Local words, as that of Mr. Ray's, the Dictionaire de la Langue Tolosaine, (at the end of Goudelin's Gascoigne Poems) and suchlike; ought to be diligently perus'd.

In "Observation II", he notes the many words in the Old Cornish Vocabulary (OCV) that are no longer understood by the Cornish, but still used by the Welsh. †Ankar 'a hermit' from the OCV is listed with an obelus as one example.

Class III

Synopsis:

An accidental Transposition of Letters ... This is call'd an Accidental Transposition, because it proceeds from a Carelesness in Pronunciation, and distinguishes it from the next class, which is of words designedly transpos'd.

"Observation III" includes examples of metathesis, such as Welsh prẏny, Cornish perna 'to buy'.

Class IV

"Transposition of Compounds."

In "Observation IV", Lhuyd describes transposition of compounds, such as Welsh lhẏgatcam 'squint-eyed' and Cornish Cabmlẏgadzhak, which "be but their corrupt pronunciation of the same word, transpos'd."

Class V

Syunopsis:

Addition of Letters ... This has partly proceeded from an Accidental mispronunciation, as, aeam for eam, &c. and partly from an Industrious Alteration of words for the easier speaking them.

"Observation V" describes how initial vowels may be added to the beginning of words. "Observation VI" describes how vowels may be added to words internally. "Observation VII" gives examples of labials inserted into words. "Observation VIII" gives examples of palatals inserted into words. "Observation IX" describes the addition of "lingual mutes" in various positions. "Observation X" describes the addition of liquids.

Class VI

"Letters Omitted ... This has happen'd after the same manner [as class V]."

In "Observation XI", Lhuyd describes apheresis, syncope, and apocope, where vowels are lost initially, internally, and in word-final positions, respectively. "Observation XII" through "Observation XVI" describe how various classes of consonantal sounds are "omitted".

Class VII

Synopsis:

Variation of Initial Syllables ... This proceeds either from the use of different prepositions or other words in Compounds; or else because some Languages retain only the simple words, and others know none but the Compounds.

"Observation XI" gives numerous examples, including Breton ⟨ki dûr⟩, an otter, contrasting with Welsh ⟨dẏvrᵹi⟩.

Class VIII

Synopsis:

A Difference of Termination ... In Etymological Observations we are to allow all Languages their 0wn Terminations ... We see then that a Distinct Termination is no more than what the Nature or Property of each Language requires; and yet the not heeding this, when the Difference is wide, and other Alterations intervene, occasions us very often to question the Origin of words, where there is not indeed room for any Doubting.

"Observation XVII" contrasts word endings in Welsh, Cornish, Breton, and Irish. The many examples given include Welsh eira 'snow', at variance with Cornish er and Breton ery𝛘; and Welsh enu 'name', in contrast with Irish ainm.

Class IX

Synopsis:

Permutation: or Change of Letters ... It may be of some use to the Curious in Etymology, if we distinguish Permutation of Letters into three sorts; which may be call'd Classical, Idiomatal, and Accidental.

In "Observation XVIII", Lhuyd goes into some detail describing vowel variations in cognate words in the Celtic languages. These are defined as classical (change of letters into the same class, or the same organ of pronunciation), idiomatal (when, from observation, at least five or six examples of primitive words show a letter of one class in one language changing into a letter of another class in another language), and accidental (similar to the previous type, but infrequent).

"Observation XIX", focusing on the labial consonants /p/, /b/, /f/, /v/, and /m/, describes lenition, part of the Celtic grammatical mutation system (for example Welsh pen 'head' becoming i ben 'his head'). Lhuyd also notes the equivalence of Welsh ⟨p⟩ with Irish ⟨c⟩ or ⟨k⟩, with examples including Welsh pedụar 'four' and Irish cathair, and also notes that ⟨p⟩ is a rare letter in Irish, apart from loanwords. "Observation XX" through "Observation XXII" catalogue a large number of sound correspondences of various types between cognate words, including in the Celtic languages, but also in Latin, Greek, and other languages.

Class X

"Forreign words introduced by Conquest or borrow'd from those Nations with whom we have Trade and Commerce."

In "Observation XXIII", Lhuyd notes the large number of Latin words in the Welsh, Cornish, and Breton vocabularies. He remarks that "part were doubtless brought hither by the first inhabitants; long before the Romans were a distinct people." From this supposed period, Lhuyd suggests basic vocabulary such as Welsh tîr, Latin terra 'land'. Lhuyd goes on to suggest that more advanced vocabulary came from the period of Roman occupation of Britain. A pair of examples he provides is Welsh kaeth and Latin captivus, 'slave'.

In "Observation XXIV", Lhuyd describes how compounds or phrases may be translated from one language to another, or: "Words Deriv'd From One Common Origin as to Signification Tho' of No Affinity in Sound." He gives examples including Welsh gloin dẏu 'butterfly', equivalent to Cornish tikki deu, and Scottish Gaelic dealan de.

=== Title II: A comparative vocabulary of the original languages of Britain and Ireland ===
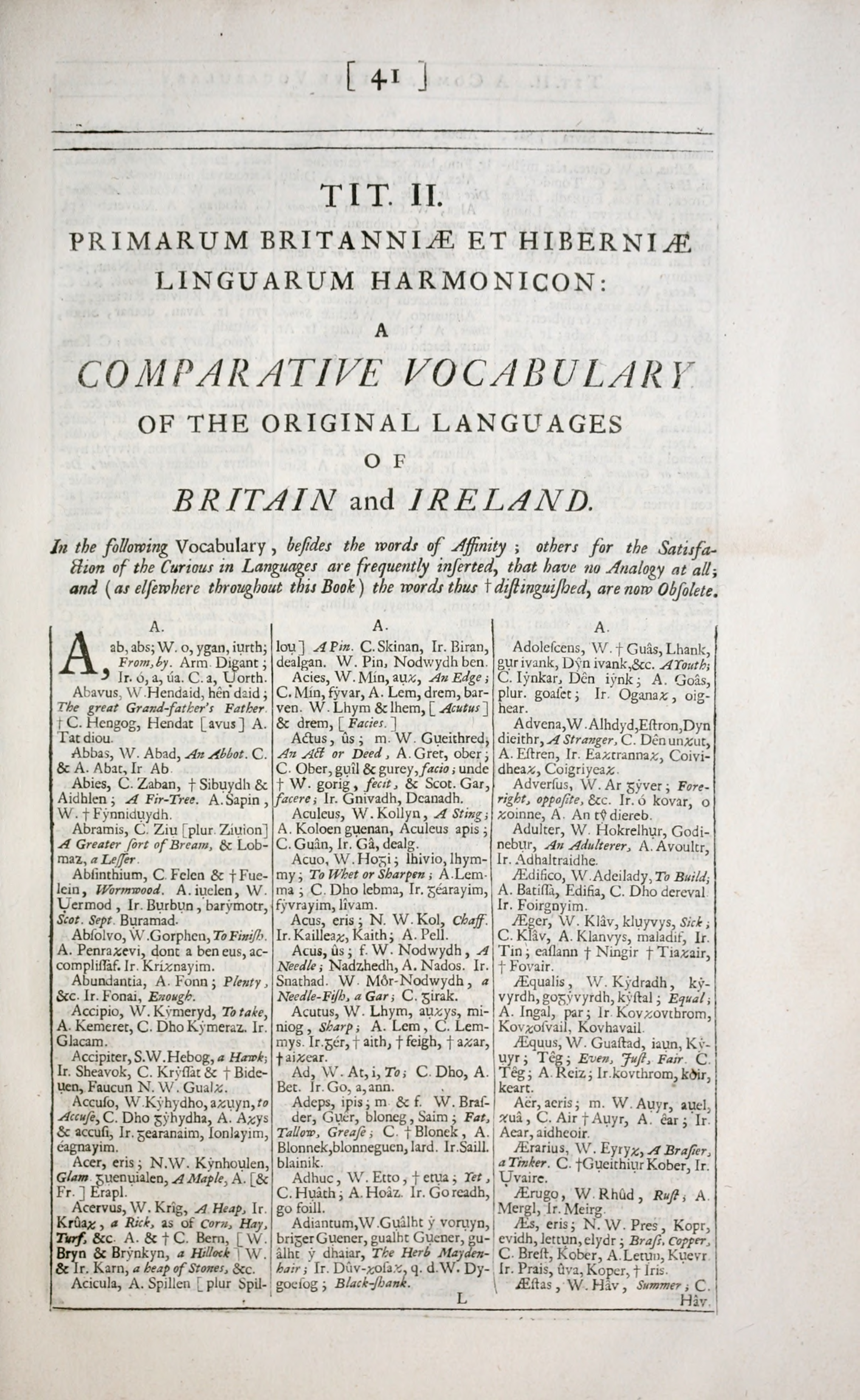
First page of Title II

This title consists of a vocabulary arranged alphabetically with Latin headwords glossed with Welsh, Cornish, Breton, Irish, Scottish Gaelic, and Manx translation equivalents, written in the phonetic transcription system devised by Lhuyd and introduced in the previous title.

=== Title III: An Armoric grammar by Julian Manoir, Jesuit ===
This title is a translation by Moses Williams of the Breton grammar originally written in French by Julian Maunoir.

==== Chapter I: Writing and pronunciation ====
Following a description of the benefits of spelling words according to how they are pronounced, this chapter goes into some detail regarding pronunciation of letters and the meaning of diacritics.

==== Chapter II: Nouns ====
This chapter describes the "Armoric" (Breton) definite and indefinite articles. There follows a description of the lack of grammatical declension in "Armoric", and a synopsis of the various plural noun endings.

Having given the most common plural endings, Section 7, "Heteroclites", lists nouns which form their plurals by vowel change, removal of singulative suffixes, or other less common ways.

The chapter then gives an overview of adjectives, and the lack of declension for number, except for certain pronouns. It then describes how regular comparatives and superlatives are formed, noting certain exceptions.

==== Chapter III: Pronouns ====
Pronouns are given in the nominative, genitive, dative, and accusative case.

==== Chapter IV: Verbs ====
The verbs 'to be' and 'to have' are described, as well as their use as auxiliaries, and grammatical tense and moods.

There follows a section of active, passive, and irregular verb tables, conjugated for tense and mood.

==== Chapter V: Participles, adverbs, and prepositions ====
This chapter covers active and passive participles.

Some examples of Breton adverb usage are given, such as ar fura oll 'the wisest of all'.

A selection of common prepositions, including a 'from', gant 'with', and hep 'without' are given, with their usage described in the next chapter.

==== Chapter VI: Syntax ====
The grammar describes "Armoric" sentence structure. Nominal sentences, for instance Me a gar 'I love', are described. Impersonal verbs with no nominative case before them, for example Glao a ra 'It rains', are also given.

The grammar notes that adjectives follow the noun they describe in Breton. Correct usage of possessive pronouns is described. The grammar describes how "nouns of number" take singular nouns, for example daou den 'two men'.

The section concludes with summaries of a number of different constructions, and a synopsis of the Breton mutation system.

=== Title IV: An Armoric vocabulary by Julian Manoir, Jesuit ===
This title, also by Lhuyd’s assistant Moses Williams, translates Julian Maunoir's Breton wordlist.

=== Title V: Some Welch words omitted in Dr Davies's Dictionary ===
Supplement to John Davies's Welsh dictionary, Antiquae linguae Britannicae ... et linguae Latinae dictionarium duplex.

=== Title VI: A Cornish grammar ===
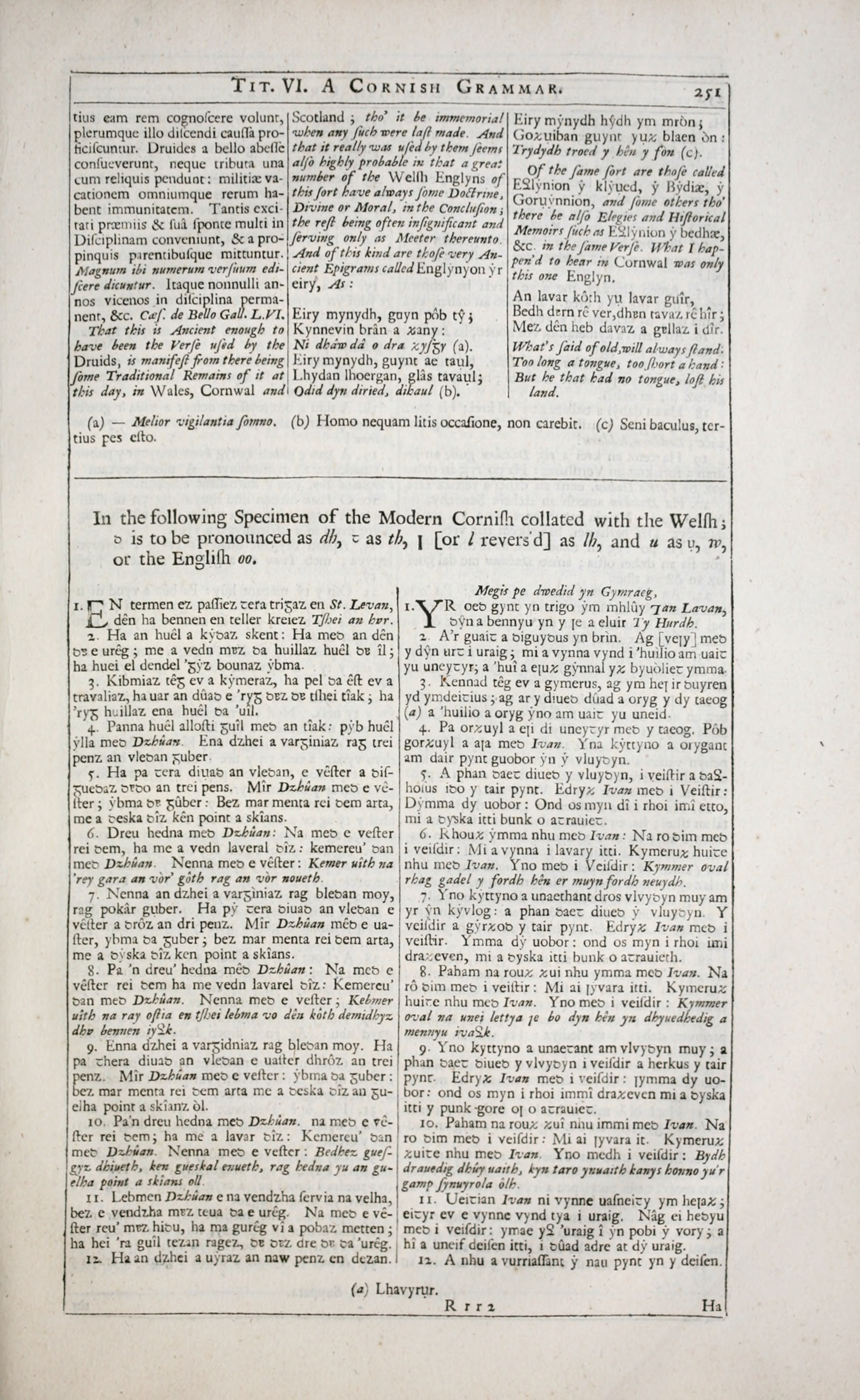
Page from the Cornish Grammar. At the bottom, part of the only surviving Cornish folk tale, Dzhuan Tshei an Hordh, is transcribed on the left, with a Welsh translation on the right.

Lhuyd writes a preface in the Cornish language. He begins by apologising for the grammar to follow, being neither born in Cornwall nor having stayed there for more than four months. He states that the inhabitants of Cornwall could produce the grammar better than himself. He expresses the hope that "this poor work" might cause somebody else to produce something better. He explains how he acquired his knowledge of the Cornish language; from the inhabitants of the west of Cornwall, particularly in St. Just; by the help of gentlemen antiquaries, who provided him with Cornish words; and from three manuscripts given him by the Bishop of Exeter, Sir Jonathan Trelawney, from which he says he got "the best part" of his knowledge. He describes his discovery that the manuscript labelled Vocabularium Wallicum was, in fact, a Cornish vocabulary.

Lhuyd describes changes in Cornish pronunciation over time based on the manuscripts he has studied, such as the development of pre-occlusion in the contemporary Cornish language, where they now "put the letter b, before the letter m", and "the letter d, before the letter n", palatalization of Old Cornish /t/ and /d/, and various other phonological features which distinguish Cornish from Welsh. Lhuyd expresses his view that Cornish is closer to Breton dialects than Welsh, which he suggests is due to Breton migration into Cornwall.

==== Chapter I: Of the letters ====
This section reintroduces Lhuyd's "General Alphabet", with some additions specifically for the Cornish language.

Lhuyd then provides a discussion of the ancient manuscripts he is aware of, along with a synopsis of the orthographic variations and his interpretation of the relationship of the written word to the pronunciation in these documents.

This is followed by a synopsis of the changes in the initial consonants of words in certain grammatical contexts, a feature of the Cornish mutation system.

Lhuyd then notes some of the sound changes from earlier Cornish to the Cornish at the time; inter alia, the change of ⟨𝛘⟩, as he writes in his "General Alphabet", or ⟨gh⟩ as written by medieval Cornish scribes, to ⟨h⟩, the change of most Old Cornish orthographic ⟨d⟩ to later Cornish orthographic ⟨s⟩, which he notes is now pronounced /z/, and the development of /t/ to /tʃ/ (the sound of ch in English church) in a few words.

Lhuyd also gives some examples of vowel insertion, for instance †dên is now pronounced as dêan. He also describes the development of pre-occlusion, where /b/ is inserted before a "middle" (medial) /m/ to give /bm/, and similarly /d/ is inserted before a "middle" /n/ to give /dn/.

The chapter closes with description of vowel loss, and the loss of certain consonants, such as initial /g/, in specific contexts.

==== Chapter II: Some further Directions for Reading old British Manuscripts ====
There is a further guide to reading ancient manuscripts, in which Lhuyd discusses how particles with grammatical function are often joined to other words in old Welsh and Cornish documents.

Lhuyd then describes the orthography of the Juvencus Manuscript. Apparently, after being allowed in to the library at Cambridge to view the manuscript in 1702, Lhuyd took a penknife to Juvencus folios 25 and 26 and stole them, leaving knife marks on adjacent folios. The folios were eventually restored to the manuscript after being found among Lhuyd's personal possessions after his death.

This is followed by a small glossary of obsolete or obscure Welsh words from the 13th and 14th centuries, with English-translation equivalents.

There follows a discussion on the differences between Welsh dialects, and between Welsh, Cornish, and Breton.

==== Chapter III: Of the articles and Nouns ====
Lhuyd describes the Cornish definite and indefinite articles, and certain prepositions which can be joined to the definite article. This is followed by a synopsis of noun plural endings, abstract noun suffixes, agent noun suffixes, feminine noun suffixes, masculine and feminine grammatical genders, and lenition of feminine nouns after the definite article. Lhuyd then enumerates the most common plural suffixes, along with some nouns that form plurals by vowel change, with numerous examples.

==== Chapter IV: Of the Pronoun ====
In this chapter, Lhuyd describes Cornish personal, possessive, relative, interrogative, and demonstrative pronouns.

==== Chapter V: Of the Verb ====
Lhuyd begins this chapter by enumerating the various regular terminations of "infinitives". He then describes the main auxiliary verbs in Cornish, bɐz 'to be' ᵹîl 'to do', and menni 'to will'. Lhuyd describes how tenses of other verbs are formed using these auxiliaries combined with verbal particles. This is followed by a description of the formation of active and passive verbs, then a few irregular or defective verbs.

==== Chapter VI: Of the Participle ====
Lhuyd notes that there is no participle of the present tense in Cornish, and so instead uses the "infinitive" with the particle a prefixed.

He describes the preterperfect tense of verbs, being formed by addition of the suffix -yz, sometimes with vowel affection.

==== Chapter VII: Of the Adverb and Interjection ====
Lhuyd describes the formation of adverbs with the particle en or yn before an adjective, corresponding to English '-ly', so for example the adjective fîr 'wise' can become an adverb, en fîr 'wisely'. Numerous other adverbs are here listed, categorized by their function, including adverbs of affirming, assembling, choosing, comparison, demonstration, denying, doubting, explication, number, place, quality, quantity, and time. Also, a limited number of interjections are given.

==== Chapter VIII: Of the Conjunction ====
Various Cornish conjunctions are listed, categorized by functions including copulative, conditional, discretive, disjunctive, causal, exceptive, adversative, and elective.

==== Chapter IX: Of the Preposition ====
Having previously discussed prepositions inflected for person, Lhuyd here discusses a number of independent prepositions. He also describes various prefixes, including gor- 'over-', the reflexive prefix om- 'self-', and the negating prefix di- 'without; sans-; -less'.

==== Chapter X: Some Proprieties of Phrase with some Notes omitted in the Foregoing Chapters, and a Specimen of the modern Cornish Collated with the Welsh ====
Lhuyd describes some Cornish idioms, as well as certain peculiarities of Cornish syntax and lexicon.

He also talks about the englyn, a traditional Cornish and Welsh short verse form. He speculates that this may have been the ancient verse form used by the druids. He includes the only englyn he heard while in Cornwall, along with a loose translation:

An lavar kôth yụ lavar guîr,
Bedh dɐrn rê ver, dhɐn tavaz rê hîr;
Mez dên heb davaz a gɐllaz i dîr.

'What's said of old, will always stand,
Too long a tongue, too short a hand;
But he that had no tongue, lost his land.'

This chapter includes a complete transcription of the only surviving Cornish-language folk tale, Dzhûan Tshei an Hɐr 'John of the House of the Ram'.

Lhuyd lists the parishes in west Cornwall where people were still speaking Cornish.

=== Title VII: Antiqua Britanniae lingua scriptorum quae non impressa sunt, Catalogus ===
A catalogue and evaluation of medieval "British" (Welsh) manuscripts.

=== Title VIII: An essay towards a British etymologicon ===
Written by David Parry, one of Lhuyd's assistants, this title features a section with English headwords, followed by a wordlist of Latin lemmata, glossed with basic vocabulary from various European languages.

=== Title IX: A brief introduction to the Irish or ancient Scotish language ===
Based mainly on the first printed grammar of the Irish language by Froinsias Ó Maolmhuaidh, with some additions.

=== Title X: Focloir Gaoidheilige-Shagsonach no Bearladoir Scot-Samhuil: An Irish–English dictionary ===
A dictionary consisting of more than ten thousand lemmata. Numerous Irish texts and dictionaries, including Risteard Pluincéad's Vocabularium Latinum et Hibernum, was used to compile this title.

=== Postliminary sections ===
Finally, the book concludes with an index, abbreviations, and a list of errata.

== Reception ==
Criticism of Lhuyd's Glossography began even before publication, leading Lhuyd to defend his work in the introduction. He remarks that his detractors suggested that no more than "half a dozen" or "half a score" would be interested in such a work. Lhuyd responds that an impartial critic would have to admit that there must be at least three or four hundred who would be interested.

The gentry of Wales were unimpressed, perhaps partly due to Lhuyd's orthography, which diverged greatly from the Welsh orthography of the time, and the intelligentsia of Paris were disappointed that the volume was not written in Latin. Additionally, the Glossography was a financial failure.

On the other hand, Glossography received praise and appreciation from contemporary English and Celtic scholars. George Hickes, in a letter to Lhuyd, wrote that "so I doubt not but it will be very satisfactory to all men, who have a genius for antiquity, and the more learned and judicious they are, the more they will approve it, and be pleased with it."

Modern linguists regard Archæologia Britannica as a pioneering work in the fields of linguistics and Celtic studies. David Quinn describes the work as "far ahead of its time", "sufficiently original to be the pioneer European work on the comparative philology of the Celtic languages", and "one of the bases on which the scientific study of Celtic philology was re-laid a century and a half later." Bivens describes it as an important contribution to the field which attempted to systematize phonological change in Celtic languages. Alexandra Walsham describes it as a "scholarly landmark which first recognized the family relationship between the various Celtic languages". According to the Evans and Roberts edition, Glossography "gave etymology a rational basis in the conceptual framework of the seventeenth-century scientific thought and thereby set the comparative method on firmer ground". Stammerjohann describes it as "remarkable for its scope and its erudition" and a "monumental work" which exerted a "profound but covert influence on comparative philology in the 19th century", but also states that "the fanciful celtomania which became prevalent in the 18th century appears to have diminished its impact on the scientific study of language".

Glossography has been described as "bringing together a whole set of lexicographal achievements". It included the first comparative glossary of the Celtic languages, the first Breton-English and Irish-English dictionaries ever printed, the first description of the dialects of Scottish Gaelic to be printed, and the first time any Manx appeared in print. Additionally it provides the only description of the traditional pronunciation of the Cornish language.

Archæologia Britannica is notable for Lhuyd's use of a system of phonetic transcription, allowing easier comparison of possible cognates between languages, as well as for introducing specific criteria for establishing that two languages are related. Lyle Campbell and William Poser have praised Lhuyd's use of sound correspondence evidence in the book (including correspondences which are unsystematic), his comparison of multiple Indo-European languages, his extensive collection of cognates, his description of sound changes, and his opinion that regular sound correspondences, and not chance similarities, are good evidence that languages are genetically related. They note that Lhuyd partially identified Grimm's law, before the work of Jacob Grimm and Rasmus Rask, and produced more sophisticated work than the later work of William Jones.

Lhuyd in Archæologia Britannica established that the language of the Vocabularium Cornicum was Cornish rather than Welsh, as had been previously thought. Walsham states that the included Cornish grammar and vocabulary "helped to lay foundations for the initiatives of Thomas Tonkin and Richard Polwhele and Jenner's revival efforts."

== Epilogue ==
Lhuyd died prematurely just two years after the publication of the Glossography in 1709, in his room at the Ashmolean Museum. His understudy, David Parry, having developed a drinking problem, died five years later in 1714. Lhuyd's manuscripts were sold by the University of Oxford in 1713 for £80, the amount of Lhuyd’s debts, to Sir Thomas Sebright. Most of the manuscripts were then auctioned by Sotheby's in 1807 and subsequently destroyed in two separate fires.
