= Vocabularium Cornicum =

Latin-Old Cornish glossary

- British Library
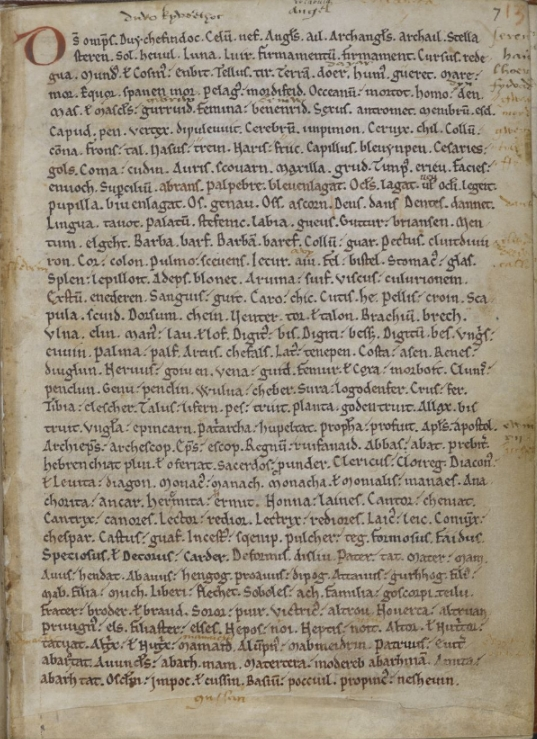
- The first page of Vocabularium Cornicum, a 12th-century Latin-Old Cornish glossary
- Also known as: Old Cornish Vocabulary; Cottonian Vocabulary
- Type: Glossary
- Date: c. 1200
- Language(s): Old Cornish, Medieval Latin, Old Welsh, Old English, Old French
- Scribe: Unknown
- Author: Unknown
- Material: Vellum
- Size: 210 x 145 mm; 4 sides; 7 leaves

The Vocabularium Cornicum, also known as the Cottonian Vocabulary or the Old Cornish Vocabulary, is a Latin-Old Cornish glossary. It is usually interpreted as an Old Cornish translation of Ælfric of Eynsham's Latin-Old English Glossary, and it is considered to be the most substantial extant document of the Old Cornish period. The only surviving copy, part of a composite manuscript known as MS Cotton Vespasian A. XIV, is now kept in the British Library, and is thought to have been copied around 1200 AD from an earlier exemplar.

== History ==
During the migration period, Germanic tribes began to settle in Britain during the 5th century after Roman occupation came to an end. The Common Brittonic language, which had been spoken over most of Roman Britain, was pushed west, eventually separating into Western Brittonic (the ancestor of Welsh) and Southwestern Brittonic (the ancestor of Cornish and Breton) under the westward advance of Anglo-Saxon forces.

The Brittonic-speaking community around the sixth century

By the time the Vocabularium Cornicum was written, the Southwestern Brittonic languages in Britain had been restricted to the territory west of the River Tamar (approximately the historic county of Cornwall), and had developed characteristic features of Old Cornish, though Kenneth Jackson describes the text as "really transitional between Old Cornish and Middle Cornish".

=== Dating and provenance ===
Jackson dates the surviving manuscript of the Vocabularium Cornicum to the end of the 12th century. It is believed to be a copy, probably produced in south-east Wales, of an earlier original, now lost, that was composed c. 1100. This earlier dating was based on Max Förster's assessment, now considered incorrect, that the Old English of Ælfric's glossary would not have been understood after that date. Most recent assessments suggest that the document dates to around 1200 or slightly later, from an original that is believed to have been created sometime in the second half of the 12th century, probably either in Cornwall or by a Cornish speaker. The manuscript is now a part of the Cotton collection in the British Library.

== Content ==
The Vocabularium Cornicum is part of a composite manuscript known as MS Cotton Vespasian A XIV containing texts believed to have been made between the early 11th and late 12th century. Other than the Latin-Old Cornish glossary, the manuscript only contains Welsh material, including a Calendar of Welsh saints and an account of the founding of Brycheiniog by the legendary Brychan.

=== Physical format ===
Only a single copy of the document survives, written in ink on sheets of parchment, and consisting of seven sides, written on folios 7r to 10r of the manuscript. Each folio is approximately 5 3/4 x 8 1/4 inches (210 x 145 mm).

=== Structure ===
The glossary itself follows the structure of Ælfric's Glossary, in general agreement with the original entry order, with the Anglo-Saxon glosses substituted by Old Cornish ones. As with Ælfric's Glossary, the glossary organises its lemmata thematically, typically with a Latin lemma followed by its Cornish translation equivalent. The glossary begins with entries for ecclesiastical subjects, then elements from the Genesis creation narrative including words for star, sun, moon, the Earth and sea, and human beings. The vocabulary continues with a range of topics: human anatomy, the church hierarchy, family members, social classes and secular ranks, professions and artisans and their associated tools, personality traits, illnesses and afflictions, legal terminology, weather, times of the day, seasons, colours, birds, fish, insects, domestic and wild mammals, herbs, trees, topographical features, architecture, household items, clothing, food and drink, and a selection of adjectives. The vocabulary contains a total of 961 lemmata, compared with 1,269 in Ælfric's Glossary.

=== Numbering ===
Lemmata in the Vocabularium Cornicum are conventionally labelled by the numerical identifier they are assigned by Eugene Van Tassel Graves in the PhD dissertation The Old Cornish Vocabulary. So for instance, "VC 1" refers to the first entry in the text, "Deus omnipotens . duy chefuidoc" 'almighty God'.

=== Vocabulary ===
Cornish is a Celtic language, and almost three-quarters (73%) of the translation equivalents in the Vocabularium Cornicum are thought to be Celtic. These include VC 32 nef 'heaven, sky' (from Proto-Celtic *nemos-), VC 35 tir 'land' (from *tīros-), VC 40 pen 'head' (from *kʷenno-), VC 128 lester 'vessel' (from *lestro-), and VC 58 euuin 'nail' (from *anɡʷīnā).

During the Roman occupation of Britain, the Common Brittonic language acquired a large number of Latin loanwords, which were assimilated into the language and in general underwent the same phonological changes as inherited Celtic words. The Vocabularium Cornicum attests many of these loanwords, and 19% of the translation equivalents are probably derived from British Latin. The many examples include VC 73 brech 'arm' (from British Latin bracc(h)ium), VC 235 ruid 'net' (from retia), and VC 848 cos 'cheese' (from caseus). There are also a smaller number of loans from late Old English (5%) and Old French (2%), and approximately 1% are of unknown origin. Old English loans include VC 711 ford 'way' (from Old English ford), VC 796 hos 'boot' (from hosan) and VC 229 creft 'art' (from cræft). The Old French loans, probably borrowed through English, include VC 167 emperor 'emperor' (from Old French emperëor), VC 232 inguinor 'craftsman' (from engi(g)neour), and VC 419 fol 'foolish' (from fol).

Until Edward Lhuyd established that the language was Old Cornish in Archæologia Britannica in 1707, the text was thought to be Welsh, and in the Cotton library was originally classified as Vocabularium Latino-Cambricum (Latin-Welsh Vocabulary) and was inscribed with the text Vocabularium Wallicum (Welsh Vocabulary). However, there are a number of undisputed Welsh glosses, sometimes side by side with their Cornish equivalent, linked by the Latin abbreviation ⟨ł⟩ (vel 'or'), and for a few lemmata only a Welsh gloss is given. Jon Mills points out that, where there are double glosses, sometimes the Cornish word is given first (e.g. VC 848 "cos ł caus" 'cheese'), and in other cases the Welsh is given first (e.g. VC 75 "lau ł lof" 'hand'). Occasionally, the scribe translates the Old English gloss from Ælfric's original Glossary, rather than the Latin lemma, sometimes resulting in the Latin being incorrectly translated (for example, VC 561 commisc bleit hahchi translates Old English gemenged hund and wulf 'mixture of dog and wolf' rather than the Latin lemma linx), and several lemmata are not translated at all. As Old Welsh, Old Breton, and Old Cornish were very similar at this time, many of the glosses would have been indistinguishable in all three languages, and Alderik Blom estimates that around 35% of the entries would have been spelled almost identically in Cornish and in Welsh, without even taking into account the considerable number of words that would have exhibited only minor vocalic differences. Nonetheless, some of the entries are certainly Welsh or show Welsh features. Oliver Padel provisionally estimates that, of all the entries, 503 are certainly Cornish, 305 could be Cornish or Welsh, 38 are Welsh or show some Welsh feature, and 94 are either unknown or "not Brittonic".

Jackson suggests that the copyist was a Welshman, who occasionally substituted or added Welsh words when copying the Cornish words in his exemplar, originally made either in Cornwall or by a Cornish speaker.

=== Orthography ===
Like Old Welsh and Old Breton, Old Cornish orthography was originally based on the pronunciation of British Latin. However, by the time of the Vocabularium Cornicum, the orthography, which Jackson describes as "chronologically more advanced than that of any other [Old Cornish] document", shows the increasing influence of Old English scribal practices, such as the use of the graphemes thorn (Þ, þ), eth (Ð, ð), and wynn (Ƿ, ƿ). In final position, ⟨p⟩, ⟨t⟩, ⟨c⟩, ⟨b⟩, ⟨d⟩, and ⟨g⟩ are generally used for the phonemes /b/, /d/, /ɡ/, /β/, /ð/, and /ɣ/ respectively, meaning that the results of Brittonic lenition are not usually apparent from the orthography when these phonemes occur in word-final position. However, in internal position, lenition is regularly shown.

=== Phonology ===
The orthography used in Vocabularium Cornicum demonstrates the development of several characteristic Cornish sound changes, and the document is important for reconstructing the phonological history of Cornish. Assibilation of the clusters /lt/ to /ls/ (e.g. mols, Welsh mollt) and /nt/ to /ns/ (e.g. abrans, Welsh abrant), and, in one case, bros, assibilation of /d/ to /z/, is shown. Denasalization of the lenited reflex of early Common Brittonic /m/ to /v/ is regularly written as ⟨f⟩, ⟨u⟩, and ⟨v⟩. Svarabhakti is regularly written as ⟨e⟩, and is found 40 times in the manuscript according to Jackson, against 3 entries where it is expected but is not written. The merger of the /uɪ/ and /ɔɪ/ diphthongs is shown in writing by an indiscriminate mixture of ⟨ui⟩ and ⟨oi⟩ spellings.
