= Nuada (given name) =

Nuada (Nuadu, Nuadat, Nuadha) is an Irish male name meaning 'the cloud maker' and is borne by several figures from mythology, legend and history, including:

- Nuada Airgetlám, king of the Tuatha Dé Danann and presumed deity
- Nuadu Finn Fáil, legendary High King of Ireland of the 11th century BC
- Nuada Necht, legendary High King of the 2nd century BC
- Mug Nuadat, 2nd-century king of Munster
- Prince Nuada, "Silverlance", a fictional character in the 2008 film Hellboy II: The Golden Army based loosely on the Irish mythology
- Nuadu, one of the scribes of the Juvencus Manuscript

== See also ==
- Delbhna Nuadat, a people of early medieval Ireland
- NUADA, a computer/network simulation management system from THALES
