= Bishop of Glasbury =

A diocese of Glasbury (Welsh: Clas Cynidr) existed in the 10th and 11th centuries. The Bishops of Glasbury are listed in a 14th-century manuscript. A less reliable list of bishops was recorded by the chronicler-monk Geraldus Cambrensis (Gerald of Wales). Situated approximately 15 km (9.3 mi) northeast of Llangors, it was the site of an early Christian church from at least the 950s, it may have become a suffragan diocese of St Davids. At least in its early years, the diocese appears to have enjoyed the support of the kings of Brycheiniog, and this enabled Glasbury's bishops to compete with their rivals at Ergyng, such as Euddogwy.

Hec sunt nomina episcoporum Clas Chenedre / Here are the names of the bishops of Clas cynindr
Name	Tenure	Notes
Brecchert (Note: The history of the early incumbents is confused, and names appear to be either missing or remain just names. For example, one Llifio, is known from his grants to have an episcopal see in the region but whose exact location is unknown.)		
Cynidr		
Gwyfan [?Gwrfan]		
Gwrfryd		
Meilyg		
Morgynnydd	Mid-10th century	Or Morgennic. Mentioned by Gerald as Morgeneu. May have succeeded Rhydderech.
Rhydderch	955	Mentioned by Gerald, but placed too early in his list. May have predeceased Morgynnydd.
David		
Wilfred		
Ithel		
Erwyd [?Erfyn]	1040	Also recorded as Heruit, itself a misspelling of Heruin.
Ælfric		
Tryferyn	d. c. 1055	Diocese amalgamated with the Diocese of Hereford. Possibly to be identified with Tramerin, also mentioned by Gerald. Known to John of Worcester for his piety. Tryferyn appears to have deputized in Hereford for Bishop Æthelstan, who went blind.
