= Juvencus Manuscript =

Old Welsh manuscript

The Juvencus Manuscript (Cambridge, Cambridge University Library, MS Ff. 4.42; Welsh: Llawysgrif Juvencus) is one of the main surviving sources of Old Welsh. Unlike much Old Welsh, which is attested in manuscripts from later periods and in partially updated form, the Welsh material in the Juvencus Manuscript was written during the Old Welsh period itself; the manuscript provides the first attestation of many Welsh words.

Around the second half of the ninth century, someone copied two Old Welsh poems into the margins: a nine-stanza englyn poem on the wonders of God's creation (generally known as the 'Juvencus nine'), and, on folios 25–26, a three-stanza poem which seems to represent a warrior lamenting his misfortunes (known as the 'Juvencus three'). These are the earliest surviving englynion. The parts of the manuscript containing the 'Juvencus three' were cut out of the manuscript and stolen in the early eighteenth century by the antiquary Edward Lhuyd (1660-1709), but were found after his death and returned to the manuscript.

== Provenance ==
The manuscript was originally produced somewhere in Wales as a text of the Latin poem Evangeliorum Libri IV by Juvencus. This text was produced by more than ten different scribes, working around 900. One had the Old Irish name Nuadu. Another included his name as a cryptogram in Greek letters: the Welsh name Cemelliauc (modern Welsh Cyfeilliog), who could have been the same person as the Bishop Cameleac whom the Anglo-Saxon Chronicle describes as being captured by Vikings in 914. To this text the scribes added a large body of glosses in Latin and Old Welsh, along with a few in Old Irish, showing that the manuscript was produced in a milieu influenced by both Welsh and Irish scholarship.

== The 'Juvencus Three' ==
As edited and translated by Jenny Rowland, the text reads:

niguorcosam nemheunaur henoid
mitelu nit gurmaur
mi am [franc] dam ancalaur

nicanamniguardam nicuasam henoid
cet iben med nouel
mi amfranc dam anpatel

namercit mi nep leguenid henoid
is discirr micoueidid
dou nam riceus unguetid

I will not speak ?...... tonight.
My warband is not overly big --
I and my freedman around our cauldron.

I will not laugh, I will not speak tonight,
although we drank matured mead,
I and my freedman around our bowl.

Let no one ask for merriment from me tonight --
my company is lowly.
Two lords may converse -- one speaks.

In Rowland's estimation,

several points of the language remain unclear but enough is intelligible thanks to Ifor Williams's work to give a view of a short saga poem in fully Old Welsh guise. The poem is not long enough to invite comparison with any extant tale or cycle, but the situation clearly demands a story background. As in Canu Llywarch and Canu Heledd the speaker appears to be a 'last survivor', but a more active one, like the narrator of "The Wanderer". Instead of a party of his equals he is reduced to the company of a mercenary or freedman and thus takes no pleasure in the evening drinking. The skilful use of repetition builds a picture of the narrator's condition and emotional state, although only lightly ornamented englynion are used.

== The 'Juvencus Nine' ==
As edited in the nineteenth century by William Forbes Skene and as translated in 1932 by Ifor Williams, the text reads:

Omnipotens auctor
Ti dicones adiamor
P...

Nit arcup betid hicouid
Canlon cetticeidin gui-- haguid
Uor --rdutou ti guirdoned

Dicones pater harimed
Presen isabruid icunmer
Nisacup m-- arwp leder

Dicones Ihesu dielimu
Pbetid aguirdou pendibu
Guot capaur anmer-- adu

Gur dicones remedau
Elbid aguirdou anguoraut
Niguru gnim nolim trinta[ut]

It cluis inban iciman
Guorsed ceinmicun ucmount ran
Ucatrintaut bean trident[an]

It cluis it humil inhared celmed
Rit pucsaun mi detrintaut
Gurd meint iconidid imolaut

Rit ercis o-- raut inadaut
Presen pioubui int groisauc
Inungueid guoled trintaut

Un hanied napuil heper
Uuc nem isnem nitcouer
Nit guorgnim molim mapmeir

Almighty Creator
Thou hast made
....

The world cannot express in song bright and melodious
Even though the grass and trees should sing
All thy glories (miracles, riches), O true Lord!

The Father has wrought [such a multitude] of wonders in this world
That it is difficult to find an equal number
Letters cannot contain it, letters cannot express it.

Jesus wrought on behalf of the hosts of Christendom
[such a multitude] of miracles when he came
(? like the grass is the number of them).

He who made the wonder of the world,
will save us, has saved us.
It is not too great toil to praise the Trinity.

Purely, without blemish
In the great assembly,
Let us extol...

Purely, humbly, in skillful verse
I should give praise to the Trinity,
According to the greatness of his power.

He has required of the host in this world that belong to him
That they should at all times
All together fear the Trinity.

The one who has both wisdom and dominion above heaven,
Below heaven, completely;
It is not too great toil to praise the son of Mary.

== Editions and translations ==
The main edition is The Cambridge Juvencus manuscript glossed in Latin, Old Welsh, and Old Irish: text and commentary, ed. by Helen McKee (Aberystwyth: CMCS Publications, 2000). A digital facsimile of the manuscript is available for viewing at the University of Cambridge library website, though there is an earlier printed facsimile too. The poetry has been edited previously:

- Ifor Williams, 'Tri Englyn y Juvencus', Bulletin of the Board of Celtic Studies, 6 (1933), 101-10 (edition of the three-stanza englyn-poem)
- Ifor Williams, 'Naw Englyn y Juvencus', Bulletin of the Board of Celtic Studies, 6 (1933), 205-24 (edition of the nine-stanza englyn-poem)
- The Beginnings of Welsh Poetry, ed. by R. Bromwich (Cardiff, 1972), pp. 89ff (editions and English translations of both the three- and the nine-stanza englynion)
- Marged Haycock, Blodeugerdd Barddas o Ganu Crefyddol Cynnar (Llandybïe, 1994), pp. 3–29
