= Ffernfael ap Meurig =

King of Gwent

Ffernfael ap Meurig or Ffyrnfael or Fernmail, fl. 880s, was king of Gwent in southeast Wales jointly with his brother Brochfael ap Meurig. Asser says in his biography of Alfred the Great that "Brochfael and Ffyrnfael, (sons of Meurig and kings of Gwent), driven by the might and tyrannical behaviour of Ealdorman Æthelred and the Mercians, petitioned King Alfred of their own accord, in order to obtain lordship and protection from him in the face of their enemies".

In early medieval Wales, it was common for brothers to share the kingship. Brochfael and Ffernfael are both listed in the Book of Llandaff as witnesses to a charter of their father, but Ffernfael does not witness any surviving charter of his own, whereas several show Brochfael as a royal grantor and witness. Ffernfael may have been subordinate to Brochfael.

== See also ==
- Kings of Gwent
