= Patrick Sims-Williams =

British professor in Celtic Studies

professor Patrick Sims-Williams FBA
- Born: 11 April 1949 (age 77)
- Spouse: Marged Haycock

Academic background
- Education: Trinity Hall, Cambridge (MA) University of Birmingham (PhD)

Academic work
- Discipline: Celtic Studies
- Sub-discipline: Celtic philology; Medieval Welsh literature; Medieval Welsh history
- Institutions: University of Cambridge; Aberystwyth University
- Notable works: The Celtic Inscriptions of Britain: Phonology and Chronology, c. 400–1200; Irish Influence on Medieval Welsh Literature; The Medieval Welsh 'Englynion y Beddau'

Patrick Sims-Williams is Emeritus Professor of Celtic Studies at Aberystwyth University and founding editor of the journal Cambrian Medieval Celtic Studies.

== Education ==
Sims-Williams was educated at Borden Grammar School in Sittingbourne, Kent. He took a B.A. at Trinity Hall, Cambridge, achieving upper-second-class honours in the Anglo-Saxon, Norse and Celtic tripos in 1972, followed by a PhD at the University of Birmingham. His twin brother Nicholas Sims-Williams is a scholar of Central Asia.

== Career ==
Following the early retirement of the Celticist Rachel Bromwich from Cambridge's Department of Anglo-Saxon, Norse and Celtic at the end of 1976, Sims-Williams was appointed to a University Assistant Lectureship in the Department from the beginning of 1977. He was promoted to a University Lectureship in 1980 and his position made permanent in 1982. In the assessment of Michael Lapidge, "it was characteristic of" the head of department at the time, Peter Clemoes, "to have appointed a younger scholar with interdisciplinary range over the Celtic languages and literatures as well as Anglo-Saxon history, rather than a dedicated specialist [...] in Old Irish or Medieval Welsh".

Sims-Williams was promoted to Reader in Celtic and Anglo-Saxon in 1993. During the same period, he was a Fellow of St John's College. As 1993 closed, he left Cambridge, taking up the position of Professor of Celtic Studies at Aberystwyth University at the beginning of 1994. In 1981, while at Cambridge, he founded the journal Cambridge Medieval Celtic Studies, renaming it Cambrian Medieval Celtic Studies in 1993 upon his move to Wales.

Sims-Williams was elected Fellow of the British Academy in 1996, and is a member of the Medieval Studies and Linguistics and Philology sections. From 1998 to 2008 he acted for the Royal Commission on the Ancient and Historical Monuments of Wales as a commissioner and in 2011 became president of the International Congress of Celtic Studies. He was made an Honorary Member of the Royal Irish Academy in 2021.

Sims-Williams has won a number of prizes, including the British Academy's Sir Israel Gollancz Prize in 1992 (for his book Religion and Literature in Western England, 600–800), the Antiquity Prize of 1999 for 1998's 'Best Paper' (for his article 'Genetics, Linguistics and Prehistory: Thinking Big and Thinking Straight', the Cambrian Archaeological Association's G. T. Clark Award in 1992 (for his book The Celtic Inscriptions of Britain: Phonology and Chronology, c. 400–1200), the Vernam Hull Prize in 2011 (for his book Irish Influence on Medieval Welsh Literature), and Jesus College, Oxford's Francis Jones Prize (for his book The Book of Llandaf as a Historical Source).

== Publications ==
- "Patrick Sims-Williams FBA - Publications_1975-2022" (PDF). The British Academy.
- Sims-Williams, Patrick (ed. and trans.), The Medieval Welsh ‘Englynion y Beddau’. Cambridge: D. S. Brewer, 2023. ISBN 9781843847069.
