= Wendy Davies =

British historian

Professor Wendy Davies OBE FBA FSA FRHistS FLSW
- Born: 1942 (age 83–84)

Academic background
- Education: University College London
- Thesis: The early charter memoranda of the Book of Llandaff (1970)

Academic work
- Institutions: University of Birmingham; University College London
- Main interests: Early medieval history

Wendy Elizabeth Davies OBE FBA FSA FRHistS FLSW (born 1942) is a British historian who is an emerita professor of history at University College London, England. Her research focuses on rural societies in early medieval Europe, focusing on the regions of Wales, Brittany and Iberia.

== Career ==
Davies studied for her BA degree (1964) and PhD degree (1970) in history at UCL. Following positions in Munich and Birmingham University (1970–76), she returned to UCL as a lecturer in medieval history in 1977. In 1979, Davies established the "Bucknell group", also known as the "Woolstone group", a coterie of early medieval historians who would convene regularly to share ideas, comprising Ian Wood, Leslie Brubaker, Ann Christys, Roger Collins, Marios Costambeys, Paul Fouracre, David Ganz, Rosemary Morris, Jinty Nelson, Tim Reuter, Richard Sharpe, Jo Story, Chris Wickham, Jenny Wormald, and Patrick Wormald. The group remained active as of 2022.

She became a professor in 1985 and thereafter became head of the department of history, then dean of the Faculty of Arts, dean of the Faculty of Social & Historical Sciences and, from 1995, UCL Pro-Provost (European Affairs). She was made a fellow of UCL in 1997. She is also a founding fellow of the Learned Society of Wales.

== Research ==
Her teaching originally covered a wide area of European and English medieval history. It has more recently concentrated on Celtic subjects, working across and within the disciplines of history, archaeology and Celtic studies.

She is particularly well known for her studies of early Welsh and Breton history. She is co-director, with Prof. James Graham-Campbell, of the interdisciplinary 'Celtic Inscribed Stones Project', established to build a database of all known early medieval Celtic inscribed stones. For the last twenty years she has also convened a major research group, known as the 'Bucknell Group', with the aim of examining the social significance of early medieval European charters. She is notable for her analysis of the Llandaff Charters.

She has a special interest in the economic and social structure of Western European pre-industrial rural communities and the ways in which they used land and for fifteen years ran, with Dr Grenville Astill, the "East Brittany Survey", a multidisciplinary research programme into settlement and land-use changes. Much of her work has involved collaboration with others and she believes in the importance of fieldwork in teaching and research. Her responsibility for co-ordinating and developing the college's European strategy required her to represent the provost and president both abroad and at home and to advise him on major European higher education trends, maintain the college's membership of European networks and work with to promote the good reputation of UCL. She is particularly concerned that academic qualifications be speedily recognised within Europe.

== Awards and honours ==
In 1988, Davies was elected as a Fellow of the Society of Antiquaries. She was elected as a Fellow of the British Academy in 1992. In 2001 she was a distinguished visiting professor at Berkeley. She served as a member of council from 2002 to 2003 and vice-president of the British Academy from 2003 to 2005. UCL marked her retirement at a reception on 30 October 2007. She was appointed Officer of the Order of the British Empire (OBE) in the 2008 Birthday Honours.

== Publications ==
- Davies, Wendy & Vierck, Hayo (December 1974). "The Contexts of Tribal Hidage: Social Aggregates and Settlement Patterns". Frühmittelalterliche Studien. 2: 223–302. doi:10.1515/9783110242072.223. S2CID 201729051.
- An Early Welsh Microcosm: Studies in the Llandaff Charters (1978)
- The Llandaff Charters (1979)
- Wales in the Early Middle Ages (1982)
- The Settlement of Disputes in Early Medieval Europe (edited, with Paul Fouracre, 1986)
- Small worlds: the Village Community in Early Medieval Brittany (1988)
- Patterns of Power in Early Wales (1990)
- A Breton Landscape (with Grenville Astill, 1997)
- From the Vikings to the Normans (2003)
- Acts of Giving: Individual, Community, and Church in Tenth-Century Christian Spain (2007)
- Welsh History in the Early Middle Ages (2009)
- Windows on Justice in Northern Iberia, 800–1000 (2016)
