= Book of Llandaff =

12th-century manuscript

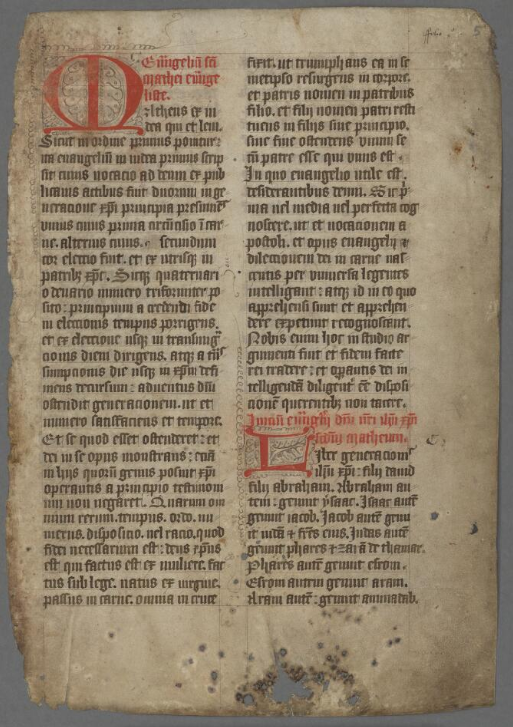
Liber Landavensis f.5r

The Book of Llandaff (Latin: Liber Landavensis; Welsh: Llyfr Llandaf, Llyfr Llan Dâv, or Llyfr Teilo) is the cartulary of the cathedral of Llandaff, a 12th-century compilation of documents relating to the history of the diocese of Llandaff in Wales. It is written primarily in Latin but also contains a significant amount of Old and Middle Welsh names and marginalia.

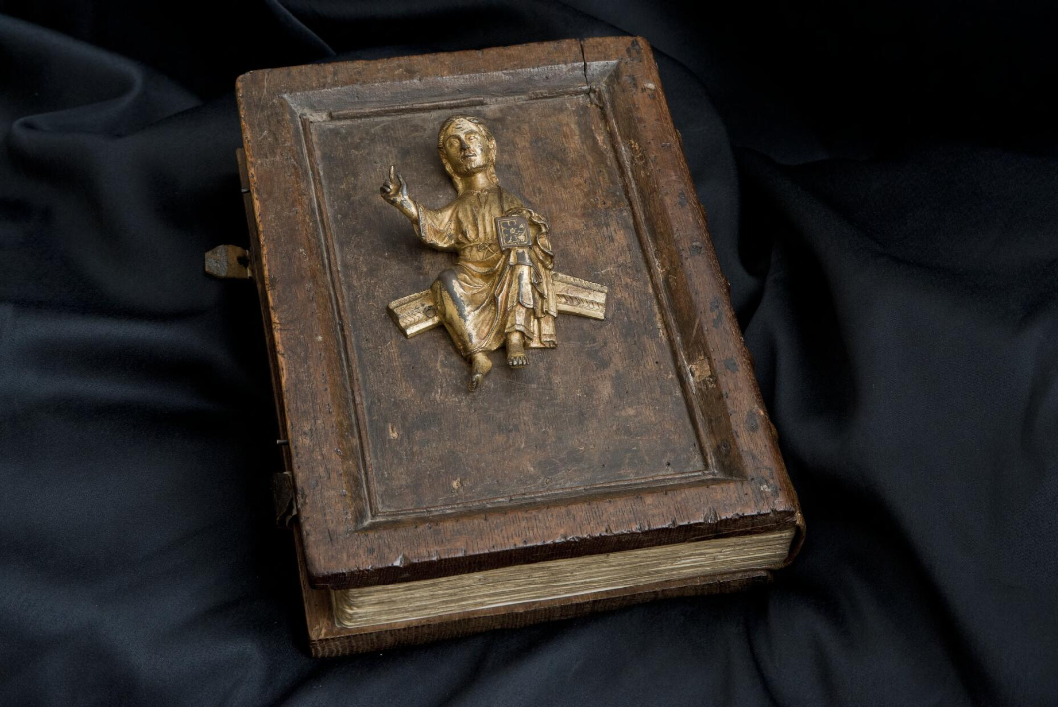
Wooden binding with metal figure

== History ==
The work was compiled around 1125 by an unknown official at Llandaff Cathedral. It contains numerous records covering five hundred years of the diocese's history, including the biographies or Lives of Saints Dubricius, Teilo and Oudoceus and, most importantly for historical research, 149 land-grant charters. These Llandaff Charters give details of property transfers to the cathedral from various local kings and other notaries, from the late 6th to the late 11th century. (About 40% belong to the 8th century and 20% to the late 9th century.) The manuscript includes the document Fraint Teilo, in the original Middle Welsh with facing Latin version, an important source for the study of early Middle Welsh; although transcribed in the beginning of the twelfth century, the orthography suggests a considerably earlier provenance.

The book was compiled from a pre-existing collection of nine charter groups, originally entered in Gospel Books, and appears to have been produced to help in Bishop Urban's diocesan boundary disputes with the dioceses of St David's and Hereford. Many of the supposed early charters have therefore been 'edited' to serve Llandaff's interests. They are also undated and many are corrupt. However, through her exhaustive study of these documents, Professor Wendy Davies has reconstructed much of the original text and calculated probable time-frames. This work has been accepted by most historians, but criticized in some non-academic quarters.

The manuscript fell into the hands of the Davies family of Llanerch in the 17th century, until being acquired by the National Library of Wales in 1959. It is a double-columned 168 page volume bound between oak boards.

== Binding ==
The Book of Llandaff is bound in thick, square edged oak boards with sunken centre panels. The lower board, which is probably the twelfth-century original, bears evidence of having been covered in a thin layer of silver and is all that remains of the earliest binding. The gilt-bronze figure of Christ in Majesty that adorned the lower cover was a mid-thirteenth century addition which has, since 1981, been kept separate from the volume in its own box. Fragments of the thin silver plate are preserved along with the figure and nail holes in the board indicate that had once been completely covered. The outline of a mandorla with associated holes in the sunken panel suggest that an earlier ornament was attached to it.

In 1696, Robert Davies of Gwysaney had the Book of Llandaff rebound. There is an inscription on the upper board formed of small brass nails that bear a few traces of enamel. The inscription reads: "Librum hunc temporis injurias passum novantiquo tegmine muniri curavit / R.D. / A° 1696".

The gilt-bronze Christ in Majesty measures 17.1 x 11.4 x 3 cm. Neil Stratford, Keeper of Medieval and Later Antiquities at the British Museum, described the Llandaff figure as "a unique survival of major English bronze-casting of the third quarter of the 13th century ...".
