= Peter Bartrum =

Historian of Welsh genealogy (1907–2008)

Peter Clement Bartrum (4 December 1907 – 14 August 2008) was a researcher and genealogist who, from the 1930s onwards, specialised in the genealogy of the Welsh nobility of the Middle Ages.

== Early life ==
Bartrum was born on 4 December 1907 in Hampstead, London, the oldest of three children to Clement Osborn Bartrum (1867–1939) and Kate Isabel Bartrum (née Shattock; 1879–1957). His father Clement, was a prominent member of the British Astronomical Association, and had an interest for precision clocks. Bartrum was educated in Clifton College, Bristol and won a maths scholarship to The Queen's College, Oxford in 1926, worth £300 (£22,613.11 in 2023) a year.

== Career ==
He joined the colonial service in 1930, and began his professional career as a meteorologist, until his retirement in 1955. Although an Englishman by birth, he developed a lifelong interest in the history and genealogy of the royal families and nobility of medieval Wales. He learned to read the Welsh language and went on to publish a compendious series of volumes containing the edited texts of medieval Welsh genealogical tracts and his own detailed reconstructions of family lines. His work is now an essential resource for any serious student of early and medieval Welsh history.

Bartrum's corrected typescripts and associated indexes were digitised by Aberystwyth University and made publicly available as the Bartrum Genealogical Project dataset. The collection includes colour scans relating to Welsh Genealogies AD 300–1400 and Welsh Genealogies AD 1400–1500, together with their indexes and introductory material.

== Personal life ==
On 19 September 1934, Bartrum married Barbara Ellen Spurling (1910–2003) and had a son, Jonathan Spurling Bartrum (b. 1936). Bartrum died on 14 August 2008, aged 100, in Hemel Hempstead.

== Bibliography ==
- Early Welsh Genealogical Tracts (1966).
- Welsh Genealogies AD 300–1400 (1974).
- Welsh Genealogies AD 1400–1500 (1983).
- A Welsh Classical Dictionary, People in History and Legend up to about A.D. 1000 (1993).
