= Meurig ab Ithel =

8th-century Welsh king

Meurig ab Ithel or Idwal was an 8th-century king of part of Glywysing in southern Wales.

Meurig's father was Idwal or Ithel ap Morgan, (c. 690, reign 710–745), king of Glywyssing, Gwent, and Ergyng. Ithel ap Morgan had been in sole possession of both Gwent and Glywysing (i.e., Morgannwg).

Meurig's paternal grandfather was Morgan the Generous, or Benefactor (Mwynfawr in Welsh), also known as Morgan ab Athrwys (d. c. 665/710), King of Glywysing. He may have been the namesake of the later realm of Morgannwg (whence the modern name for Glamorgan is derived), although his descendant Morgan the Old is a more likely possibility. Meurig's grandmother may have been Ricceneth, and he had an uncle named Gwyddnerth.

Meurig was the great-grandson of Athrwys ap Meurig and possibly Cenedlon ferch Briafael Frydig, and the great-great-grandson of King Meurig ap Twedrig and Onbrawst, daughter of Gwrgan Fawr, the last King of Ergyng. This is thought to be how Ergyng became part of the territorial holdings of the family.

Meurig is recorded in charters, including giving gifts to Bishop Cadwared of Llandaff. He is recorded as giving the church property jointly with his father Idwal and brother Ffernfael ap Ithel. Meurig is also recorded as having sold a uilla to Iddon, son of Ceirio in conjunction with his father and brothers Ffernfael, Rhodri and Rhys, who are recorded as witnesses on the charter. These documents were later used as proof of the donors' ownerships when donating the land to the church at Llandaff.

Meurig's father Idwal ap Morgan seems to have inherited his father Morgan's realm including lands in Gower, Glamorgan, and Gwent, and probably sovereignty of most of the region between the River Loughor and the River Wye as a whole. It is thought that he then divided it among his many sons: Ffernfael in Gwent and Rhys, Rhodri, and Meurig in parts of Glywysing. Ergyng (now in western Herefordshire in England) was apparently lost to the Saxon kingdom of Hwicce around this time. Alternatively, Ffernfael's brothers Rhodri and Rhys and his nephew Brochfael may have inherited in turn, but lost Gwent to Ffernfael (died c. 775) for a time.

John Edward Lloyd noted that the Kingdom of Glywysing at this time was "involved in much obscurity". It was eventually united by the line of Meurig's brother Rhys ap Ithel during the reign of King Hywel ap Rhys (Glywysing) or his sons Arthfael and Owain ap Hywel (Glywysing).
