= Ffernfael ab Idwal =

8th-century king of Gwent

Ffernfael ab Idwal or Ithel (died c. 775) was a late 8th-century king of Gwent in southeast Wales. His name seems to mean "strong ankles". His father was Idwal or Ithel ap Morgan, (c. 690, reign 710–745), king of Glywyssing, Gwent, and Ergyng.

Ffernfael's paternal grandfather was Morgan the Generous, or Benefactor (Mwynfawr in Welsh), also known as Morgan ab Athrwys (d. c. 665/710), King of Glywysing. He may have been the namesake of the later realm of Morgannwg (whence the modern name for Glamorgan is derived), although his descendant Morgan the Old is a more likely possibility. Ffernfael's grandmother may have been Ricceneth, and he had an uncle named Gwyddnerth.

Ffernfael was the great-grandson of Athrwys ap Meurig and possibly Cenedlon ferch Briafael Frydig, and the great-great-grandson of King Meurig ap Twedrig and Onbrawst, daughter of Gwrgan Fawr, the last King of Ergyng. This is thought to be how Ergyng became part of the territorial holdings of the family.

Ffearnfael married Ceingaer as his queen. They are both recorded in charters, including giving gifts to Bishop Cadwared of Llandaff. He is recorded as giving the church property jointly with his father Idwal and brother Meurig ap Ithel. Ffernfael is also recorded as having sold a uilla to Iddon, son of Ceirio in conjunction with his father and brothers Meurig, Rhodri and Rhys, who are recorded as witnesses on the charter. These documents were later used as proof of the donors' ownerships when donating the land to the church at Llandaff.

Ffernfael's father Idwal ap Morgan seems to have inherited his father Morgan's realm including lands in Gower, Glamorgan, and Gwent, and probably sovereignty of most of the region between the River Loughor and the River Wye as a whole. It is thought that he then divided it among his many sons: Ffernfael in much of Gwent and Rhys, Rhodri, and Meurig in parts of Glywysing. Ergyng (now in western Herefordshire in England) was apparently lost to the Saxon kingdom of Hwicce around this time. Alternatively, Ffernfael's brothers Rhodri and Rhys and his nephew Brochfael may have inherited in turn, but lost Gwent to Ffernfael for a time.

Ffernfael's death is recorded by the undated Annals of Wales. Phillimore's reconstruction places the entry in the year 775.

== Children ==
- Athrwys, king of Gwent

== See also ==
- Kings of Gwent
