= Ithel ap Morgan =

King of Gwent

Ithel or Idwal ap Morgan (c. 690, reign 710–745) was a king of Gwent and Glywysing (i.e., Morgannwg) in southeastern Wales in the eighth century.

His father was Morgan ab Athrwys (d. c. 665/710), King of Glywysing, who may have been the namesake of the later realm of Morgannwg (whence modern Glamorgan), although his descendant Morgan the Old is a more likely possibility. Ithel's mother may have been Ricceneth, and he had a brother named Gwyddnerth. Ithel may have been named for his paternal uncle Ithel.

Ithel was the grandson of Athrwys ap Meurig and possibly Cenedlon ferch Briafael Frydig, and the great-grandson of King Meurig ap Twedrig and Onbrawst, daughter of Gwrgan Fawr, the last King of Ergyng, an early medieval Welsh kingdom in what is now western Herefordshire in England.

Ithel is recorded in the Book of Llandaff as selling a uilla of land, in conjunction with his mother and father, Ricceneth and Morgan. He is also recorded as having sold a uilla to Iddon, son of Ceirio in conjunction with his sons, who are recorded as witnesses on the charter Arthfael, (possibly a misreading of Fearnfael), Meurig, Rhodri and Rhys. These documents were later used as proof of the donors' ownerships when donating the land to the church at Llandaff.

Ithel seems to have inherited his father's realm including lands in Gower, Glamorgan, and Gwent, and probably sovereignty of most of the region between the River Loughor and the River Wye as a whole, but then divided it among his many sons: Ffernfael in Gwent and Rhys, Rhodri, and Meurig in parts of Glywysing. Ffernfael married Ceingaer and they are both recorded in charters, including giving gifts to Bishop Cadwared of Llandaff.

Ithel may be the king who is commemorated by and with Abbot Sampson on a decorated and inscribed cross found in the churchyard of Llanilltud Mawr.
