= Inabwy =

Sixth and seventh century Welsh bishop and saint

Inabwy (born c. 530; also known as Junabius, Iunapeius, Junabo, Dinabo, Dinebo) was a Welsh bishop and saint who lived in the sixth and seventh century.

Although he appears in the traditional list of Bishops of Llandaff, it is more likely that Inabwy was Bishop of Ergyng in the early seventh century. His father was Rhun ab Eneas Ledewig the Breton, his mother was the sister of Peibio Clafrog, King of Ergyng, and his grandmother was possibly the former wife of Saint Gwen Teirbron. As a youth he became a follower of his cousin Saint Dyfrig, and worked alongside Saint Teilo when Teilo returned to Llandeilo Fawr in around 560. In his later years he became Bishop of Ergyng and perhaps died in around 625.

== Dedications ==
Inabwy is known to have founded churches at Llanloudy, Llanbudgualan (now Ballingham) and Llandinabo during his time as bishop. The church of St Junabius at Llandinabo in Herefordshire is still dedicated to him.
