= Cadwgan ab Owain =

Cadwgan ab Owain (died 951) was a joint king of Glywysing in Wales of the High Middle Ages along with his brother Gruffydd. His other brother Morgan ruled in Gwent.

Cadwgan the son of Owain ap Hywel (Glywysing) and Elen ferch Rhodri (born c. 850). He was a grandson of Hywel ap Rhys (Glywysing), who united and ruled the Kingdom of Glywysing in south east Wales at the end of the 9th century. He had two known brothers. Morgan ab Owain, also known as Morgan Hen (the Old), Morgan ab Owain of Gwent and also as Moragn Hen Fawr, king of Morgannwg, died in 974. Morgan ruled Gwent from c. 930 and Morgannwg from AD 942 to 974. He earned his nicknames for his unusual longevity in the wartorn era of tenth century Wales. The second brother Gruffydd ab Owain (died c. 935 of unknown causes), and ruled as joint kings of Glywysing with Cadwgan.

Cadwgan succeeded his father, Owain c. 930 as king in Gwysing, alongside Gruffydd. Morgan started his rule at the same time.

Gruffydd's death was recorded in the Annals of Wales. Phillimore's reconstruction of the dates places the entry in AD. 935. Afterwards, Cadwgan seems to have ruled alone as King of Glywysing until his own violent death c. 951.

Cadwgan's murder "by the Saxons" was recorded in the Annals of Wales. Phillimore's reconstruction of the dates places the entry in AD 951.

Following his brothers' deaths, Morgan absorbed their kingdom into his and united the former kingdoms of Gwent and Glywysing in 942 under the name of Morgannwg. Morgan paid homage to the English kings as a form of protection and is recorded as witnessing royal charters for Kings Æthelstan, Eadred and Eadwig.

His murder "by the Saxons" was also recorded in the Annals of Wales. Phillimore's reconstruction of the dates places the entry in AD 951. Afterwards, the kingdoms of Gwent and Glywysing were united under his brother Morgan as Morgannwg.
