= Erging =

Erging may refer to:

- Ergyng, early medieval Welsh kingdom
- Indoor rower, type of indoor rower
