= Caemawr Greyhound Stadium =

Former greyhound racing track in Wales

- Location: Porth, Rhondda Cynon Taf, Glamorgan, Wales,
- Coordinates: 51°36′48″N 3°24′53″W

The Caemawr Greyhound Stadium is a former greyhound racing track in Porth, Rhondda Cynon Taf, Glamorgan, Wales.

The stadium was situated south of the River Rhondda off the Cymmer Road. Access to the track was on the Caemawr Road and was found at the back of the houses in Park Crescent. The land was originally waste land near the Upper Cymmer Colliery and it was not until the 1950s that a stadium was constructed. The racing was independent (unaffiliated to a governing body) and is known to have taken place in the 1960s and early 1970s.

The track only survived a short while and was replaced by housing in the early seventies. Today the area is housing known as Caemawr Gardens.
