= The Guns =

The Guns may refer to:

- The Guns (band), a band from South Wales
- The Guns (film), a film directed by Ruy Guerra
- The Guns EP, an EP by Minuit

== See also ==
- The Gunns, a professional wrestling tag team
