= Hywel ap Rhys (Glywysing) =

Welsh king of Glywysing (ruled 840–886)

Hywel ap Rhys ('Hywel son of Rhys') (ruled c. 840–886) was a king of Glywysing (either in part or in its entirety) in South Wales.

His sons Arthfael and Owain were probably responsible for the reunification of the realm of Morgannwg. His grandsons, Owain's sons, Gruffydd ab Owain (died c. 935 at the hands of troops from Ceredigion) and Cadwgan ab Owain (died c. 949 or 951, "murdered by the Saxons") ruled as joint kings of Glywysing from c. 930 until their deaths, before the surviving brother Morgan Hen ab Owain (d. 974), having previously ruled as King of Gwent, brought the territories together under him as the Kingdom of Morgannwg.

== The Houelt Cross ==
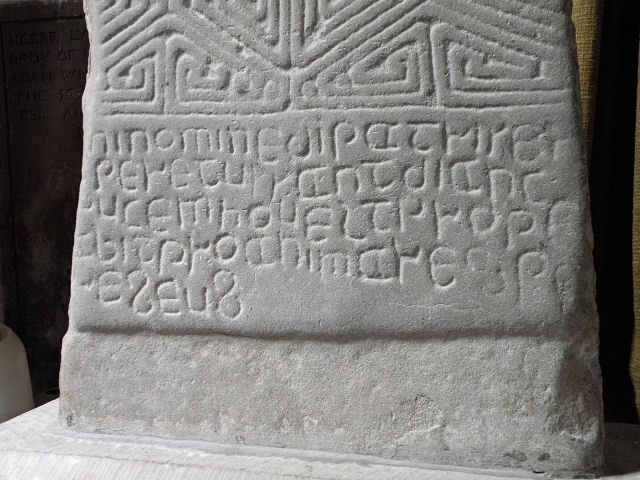
Inscription at the base of the Houelt Cross

A cross in the collection of ancient stones at St Illtyd's Church, Llantwit Major has been identified with Hywel. The Houelt Cross has a Latin inscription written in half-uncial Latin which has consistently been interpreted as a memorial cross raised by Hywel for his father.

R. A. Stewart Macalister read the inscription as:

"NINOMINEDIPATRISE/TS | PERETUSSANTDIANC | --]UCEMHOUELTPROPE | --]BITPROANIMARESPA | --]ESEUS"

In 1950 Victor Erle Nash-Williams translated it as "In the Name of God the Father and of the Son and of the Holy Spirit. This cross Houelt (PN) prepared for the soul of Res (PN) his father" while in 1976 the Royal Commission on the Ancient and Historical Monuments of Wales translated it as "In the name of God, the Father and the Holy Spirit, Houelt (PN) prepared this cross for the soul of Res (PN) his father".

The Cross itself is a striking example of a Celtic wheel cross and features interlacing carvings, and the work is a lasting reminder of Hywel's wealth and influence.

== Children ==
- Arthfael (died c. 916)
- Owain (died c. 930)
- Ermithridd
- Nest
