= Morgan ab Athrwys =

8th-century Welsh king

Morgan ap Athrwys (fl. c. 730) was a king of Gwent and Glywysing (i.e., Morgannwg) in southeast Wales. He was the grandson of Meurig ap Tewdrig and the son of Athrwys ap Meurig.

== Reign ==
Morgan was the grandson and probable successor of King Meurig. Lloyd argues that his timing and joint rule over Gwent and Glywysing makes him the probable namesake for the later realm of Morgannwg (whence modern Glamorgan), although his descendant Morgan the Old is another possibility. Through his grandmother Onbraus ferch Gwrgant Mawr, he may have been heir to the kingdom of Ergyng as well.

The charters, contained in the Book of Llandaff, include a number of grants which he is said to have made, to the church of Llandaff in the time of Bishops Oudoceus and Berthguin. Other charters in the book, of the time of Berthguin, are attested by him, and an account is also given of ecclesiastical proceedings taken against him by Oudoceus in consequence of his murdering his uncle Ffriog Though the Book of Llandaff was compiled about the middle of the twelfth century, at a time when the see was vigorously asserting disputed claims, it nevertheless embodies a quantity of valuable old material, and is probably to be relied upon, in the general view it gives of the position of Morgan. He appears as owner of lands in Gower, Glamorgan, and Gwent, and, since the latter two districts were afterwards ruled over by his descendants, was probably sovereign of most of the region between the River Loughor and the River Wye.

He seems to have been succeeded by his son Ithel, before Ithel's many sons divided their patrimony among themselves.
