= Britain in the Middle Ages =

During most of the Middle Ages (c. 410–1485 AD), the island of Great Britain was divided into multiple kingdoms. By the end of the period two remained: the Kingdom of England, of which Wales was a principality, and the Kingdom of Scotland. The following articles address this period of history in each of the nations of Great Britain:

- England in the Middle Ages
  - Anglo-Saxon England (600–1066)
  - England in the High Middle Ages (1066 – c. 1216)
  - England in the Late Middle Ages (c. 1216 – 1485)
- Scotland in the Middle Ages
  - Scotland in the Early Middle Ages (400–900)
  - Scotland in the High Middle Ages (900–1286)
  - Scotland in the Late Middle Ages (1286–1513)
- Wales in the Middle Ages
  - Wales in the Early Middle Ages (c. 383 – c. 825)
  - Wales in the High Middle Ages (c. 825 – 1282)
  - Wales in the Late Middle Ages (1282–1542)

== See also ==
- Ireland in the Middle Ages
- Isle of Man in the Middle Ages
