= Owain ap Hywel (Glywysing) =

Welsh king of Glywysing and Gwent (died 930)

Owain ap Hywel (died c. 930) was a king of Glywysing and Gwent in southeastern Wales.

Owain's father Hywel was king of Glywysing until his death around AD 886. Although the unified kingdom of Glywysing and Gwent became known as Morgannwg in honor of Owain's son Morgan the Old, Charles-Edwards argues that it is probable that the two realms were already united during Owain's reign. Owain or his brother Arthfael must have gained control of Gwent by conquest or inheritance from the previous rulers (their cousins), with the realm becoming united after Arthfael's death around 916.

Along with Hywel the Good, Owain met with King Æthelstan of Wessex following the latter's conquest of Northumbria. Around 927, he and Hywel "established peace with pledge and oaths" at Eamont Bridge near Penrith. The subsequent tribute payments in silver and in kind were bemoaned by the bards as a heavy burden.

Owain's death initially divided the kingdom again among his three sons, but the long-lived Morgan outlasted his brothers and reunited the realm again, which thenceforth carried his name.

== Children ==
Owain's wife was Elen ferch Rhodri (born c. 850). His sons were:

- Cadwgan (king of West Glywysing, killed c. 950)
- Morgan the Old (initially king of Gwent, died c. 974)
- Gruffydd (king of East Glywysing, killed c. 935)
