= Peibio Clafrog =

Peibio Clafrog Pepianus Spumosus
- King of Ergyng
- Reign: ca. 449
- Successor: Cynfyn
- Issue: Efrddyl, Cynfyn

Peibio Clafrog (also known as Pepiau Glavorawc, or in Latin, Pepianus Spumosus) was King of Ergyng in southeast Wales during the 5th or 6th century. He is chiefly known from the legends surrounding Saint Dubricius, who was said to be his grandson. The contemporary form of his name appears to be Peibio, as preserved in place-names such as Garthbeibio in Montgomeryshire and Ynys Beibio near Holyhead.

== Life of Dubricius ==
Peibio Clafrog appears in the Life of Dubricius, included in the 12th-century Book of Llandaff (Liber Landavensis), as well as in works derived from it and in various charters associated with Dubricius. He is consistently described as Dubricius' maternal grandfather.

In the Life, Peibio is King of Ergyng and has a daughter, Efrddyl. He suffers from a mouth ailment that causes constant salivation. This is said to be the source of his epithet Clafrog, though the term literally means "scabby" or "leprous". It appears to have been confused with the similarly sounding Glyfoer or Glafoer, meaning "drivel".

One day, returning from a skirmish, Peibio asks his daughter to help him wash his head and discovers she is pregnant. Enraged, he orders her to be tied in a sack and drowned in a river. When she washes ashore, he then orders her to be burned alive. However, the next day his servants find her miraculously unharmed and nursing her newborn child atop the unlit pyre. Regretful, Peibio brings Efrddyl and the infant to his court. When the baby touches him, Peibio is instantly cured of his affliction. In gratitude, he grants the child the site of his remarkable birth, called Matle (Madley), where a monument is eventually erected in commemoration.

John Lewis, in his History of Great Britain, describes the monument as extant in his time:

In Herefordshire, in a parish (probably he means Madley) is the picture of a King, with a man on each side of him, with napkins wiping the rheum and drivel from his mouth; that humour so abounding in him that he could get no cure for it, which King the country people call King Driveller, the Britons Pebiau Glavorawc, the Latins Pepianus Spumosus, Rex Ereychi."

Given the similarity in names, it is possible that Pepiau and Pabiali, the son of Brychan, were the same person—though this would make Dubricius a great-grandson of Brychan, a generational gap that seems improbable. Dubricius’ mother cannot have been the daughter of Meyrig, son of Tewdrig, since Meyrig died in 575 at the age of 90, whereas Dubricius was born in 475, consecrated bishop in 505, and died in 560 at the age of 85.

In the genealogies preserved in the Jesus College MS 20 (15th century), Peibio is called Peibiawn Glawrawc and is listed as the son of Arbeth and the father of Tewdwr.

Peibio was also the uncle of Saint Inabwy, disciple of Dubricius and later Bishop of Ergyng.

== Possible alternative identities ==
According to the tale of Culhwch and Olwen, two kings named Nynnio and Peibio were transformed into horned oxen as punishment for their sins. They also appear as mad kings and brothers in the tale of Rhitta Gawr.
