= Gwrfoddw =

- King of Ergyng
- Reign: c. 615 – c. 619
- Predecessor: Cynfyn
- Successor: Gwrgan Fawr
- Issue: Erfig
- Father: possibly Amlawdd Wledig

King Gwrfoddw (Latin: Gurvodius rex Ercyg, died c. 619) was the King of Ergyng, a south-east Welsh kingdom of the early medieval period. He usurped the throne from Gwrgan ap Cynfyn.

== Life ==
According to the Book of Llandaff, Gwrfoddw was victorious against the Anglo-Saxons and granted lands on the Wye to the Bishops of Ergyng in thanks. Dr. Wendy Davies calculates his reign to have taken place between about 615 and 619. His son, Erfig, was ousted upon his death in favour of King Cynfyn's son, Gwrgan Fawr.

== Gwrbothu Hen ==
Scholars Rachel Bromwich and D. Simon Evans note that Gwrbothu Hen, a brother of King Arthur's mother who was killed by Twrch Trwyth in the 11th/12th century Welsh text Culhwch and Olwen, may refer to Gwrfoddw. Later legendary genealogies fix him and his brothers Llygadrudd Emys, Gweir Paladr Hir, and Gweir Gwrhyd Ennwir as sons of Amlawdd Wledig. The Arthurian legends are generally set in the late 5th or early 6th century, some time before Gwrfoddw, though medieval stories are not always precise with their chronology. Gwrbothu's epithet Hen ('the old' or 'the elder') is sometimes known to denote an ancestor or dynastic forebear, which provides the possibility that Gwrbothu Hen was a forefather or predecessor of Gwrfoddw.
