= Fuck the Demon Outta Me =

Album by The Guns

Studio album by The Guns
- Released: 21 November 2011
- Recorded: 2011
- Genre: Rock, punk rock
- Producer: Alex Wiltshire

The Guns chronology
Treacle & Pie (2010)	Fuck the Demon Outta Me (2011)

Fuck the Demon Outta Me is the second album from the Welsh rock quartet The Guns. The album was released independently on 21 November 2011 through iTunes, with 200 hand numbered hard copies made available through the band's bigcartel store. Produced by Alex Wiltshire at The Lodge Productions studio, Fuck The Demon Outta Me has, so far, produced 2 singles, one of which has had a music video created for it.

== Track listing ==
1. Daughter Of A Bad Man
2. All Aboard
3. Treacle And Pie
4. Answers
5. Voodoo Boogie
6. You Drive And I'll Eat This
7. Missing Girls
8. Moan Kill You To
9. Nighty Night Creepin'
10. Stranger Than You

== Videos ==
1. Missing Girls (2011)
