= Tynewydd Colliery disaster =

1877 coal-mine flood in Wales

Coordinates: 51.614869°N 3.411450°W

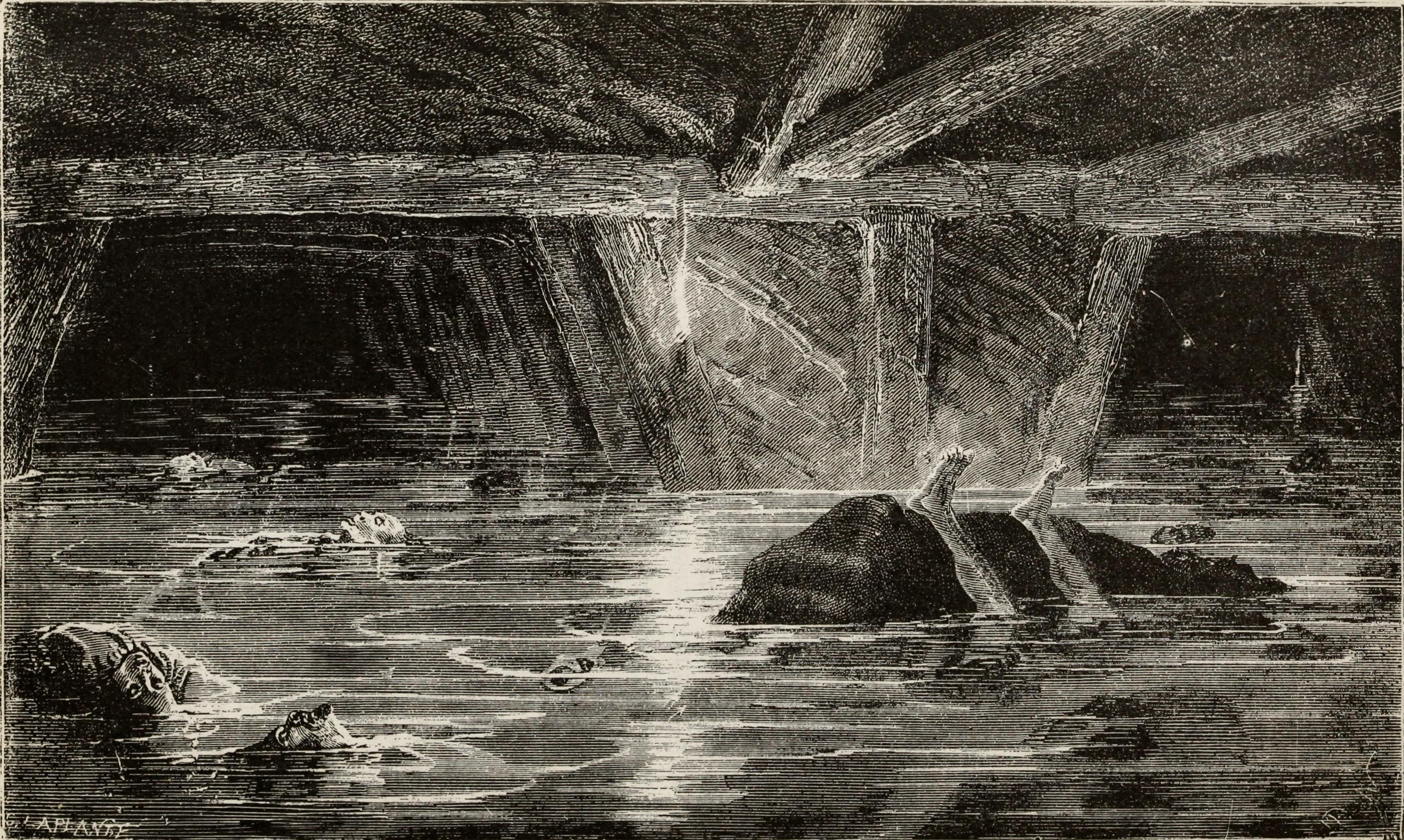
- Date: 11 April 1877
- Time: 4pm
- Location: Porth, Wales
- Cause: Flooding from nearby colliery
- Deaths: 5

The Tynewydd Colliery disaster occurred on 11 April 1877, when water from a nearby closed colliery flooded the Newydd Colliery in Porth and 14 miners became trapped, of which five died. For his efforts in the rescue, Henry Naunton Davies received the first BMA Gold Medal and for the first time the Albert Medal for Lifesaving was awarded for gallantry on land.
