= Glywys =

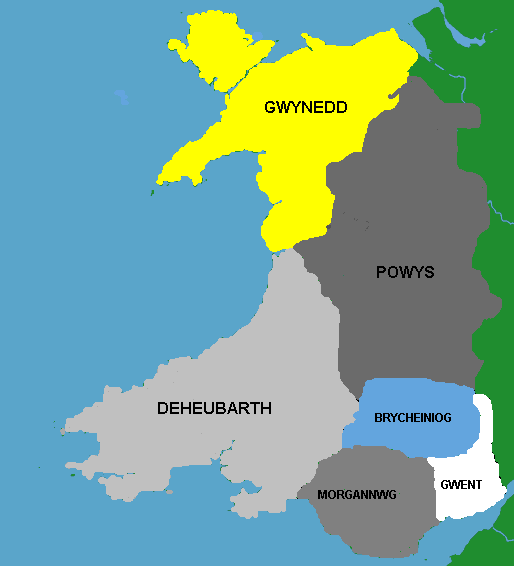
A map of the early Welsh kingdoms

Glywys is a legendary early 5th century Welsh king, an important character in early Welsh genealogies as the eponymous founder king of Glywysing, a southeast Welsh kingdom whose heartland lay between the Tawe and the Usk.

== Biography ==
In one genealogy Glywys is reckoned the eldest son of Solor, son of Mor. He is said to have married Gwawl, the daughter of Ceredig of Ceredigion: one legend states they had twenty two children, all male bar one, including the churchmen Pedrog and Edelig. According to twelfth century sources, after the death of Glywys the kingdom was divided into three cantrefi, Gwynllwg, Penychen and Gorfynydd, by his sons Gwynllyw father of Cadoc, Pawl and Merchwyn respectively, though Glwysing still existed and would later become Glamorgan. Gwynllyw gave his name to Newport Cathedral and also to Wentlooge.

Glywys' name may be a back-formation from the name of the kingdom and Glywysing's name may continue that of the Romano-British *Glevenses, the territory and citizens of Glevum, or Gloucester. Such invented founding kings are not uncommon in British genealogy. "Gloucester" (Glowancestre, 1282) derives from the Old English ceaster, "fort", preceded by the Roman stem Glev- (pronounced glaiw). In Old Welsh, the city was known as Caerloyw, caer = castle, and loyw from gloyw = glowing/bright. Hence Gloucester has been given a similar founder, Gloyw: genealogies of Vortigern make him a descendant of Gloyw through his father Vitalus and his grandfather Vitalinus, while a lineage in the Bonedd y Saint makes saint Mechyll fab Echwys the grandson of Gwyn Glohoyw and the great-grandson of Gloyw Wallt-Lydan. In the Mabinogi, similarly, Pryderi marries Cigfa, "daughter of Gwyn Glohoyw, son of Gloyw Wallt-Lydan, son of Casnar Wledig".

Nevertheless Glywys is believed to have become a hermit in his later life and travelled to Cornwall where he founded the church of St Gluvias near Penryn. He is sometimes referred to as the Cornish Glywys, Glywys Cernyw.

He is venerated as a saint and his feast day is 3 May
