= Margaret Bevan =

Welsh-born child evangelist and singer

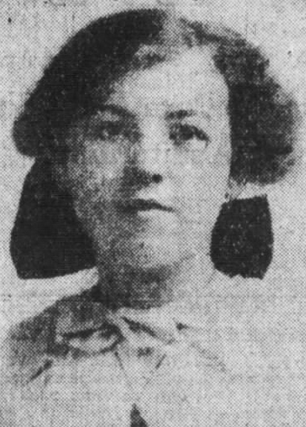
- Margaret Bevan Gealy, from a 1916 newspaper.
- Born: about 1894; Porth, Glamorgan, Wales
- Died: 20 December 1953; Bethesda, Maryland
- Occupations: Child evangelist, singer

Margaret Jane Bevan Geally (born c. 1894 – 20 December 1953), also called Maggie Bevan, was a Welsh-born child evangelist and singer, who twice toured the United States as a teenager, giving sermons and recitals in churches.

== Early life ==
Margaret Bevan was born in about 1894, at Porth, and raised in Caerphilly. Her father was Rees Bevan, an optician, watchmaker and jeweller. Her uncle was Dr. Gomer Lewis, a preacher in Swansea. A pastor's advice moved her to evangelism.

She earned a certificate from the Glamorgan Welsh Baptist Association in 1909, for passing the examination for entry into the ministry. She was hailed as a "pulpit prodigy" when she preached at Barry Docks later in 1909.

== Career ==
Her mother accompanied her when, in 1910, she embarked on a preaching tour of American cities, especially in New York, Pennsylvania and Ohio. She also sang, with her mother providing piano accompaniment. That tour was judged a "triumphant" success, and she was encouraged to return for another tour in 1911–1912. On this second tour, she visited the western United States, including an appearance in Denver, Colorado.

Margaret Bevan was still preaching and singing in America in 1914 and 1915, while living in Scranton. Her parents were living in Scranton at the time too; her father died by suicide in a Scranton charity institution in 1915.

== Later years ==
Margaret Bevan married engineer Edgar J. Geally of Scranton in November 1915; both of his parents were from Wales. Their first child, a son, was born in Wilkes-Barre in 1918. She was soon after preaching as "Mrs. Maggie Bevan Gealy." She was "Mrs. Margaret B. Gealey" of Kingston, Pennsylvania when she preached at Cambridge, Massachusetts in 1920. In 1923 she played the title role in a Wilkes-Barre production of "Princess Bonnie", a musical to benefit the American Legion.

The Gealys moved to Pittsburgh in 1928 for Edgar's work. In the 1930s and 1940s Margaret was active in the Women's Welsh Club of Pittsburgh, and still involved with music. She died in 1953.
