= The Pop Factory =

Media complex in South Wales

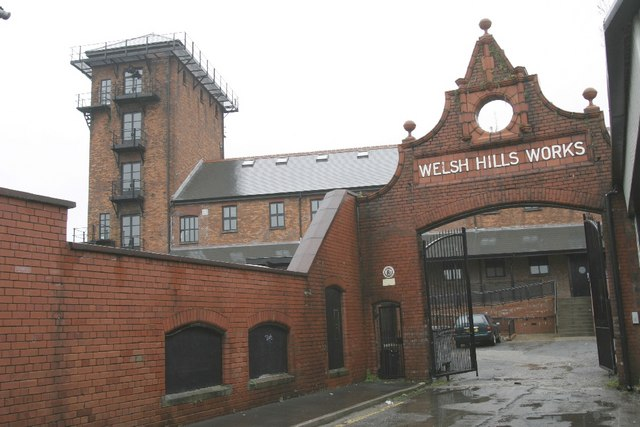
The Pop Factory

The Pop Factory (TPF) is a music and media complex in Porth, Rhondda, South Wales, which gave its name to a pop music TV show of the early 2000s.

The music venue was founded by married couple Emyr Afan and Mair Afan Davies.

The Pop Factory was a converted soft drinks factory, formerly belonging to the "Welsh Hills" brand (which later became "Corona"). The pop factory was situated in the Thomas and Evans building. Thomas and Evans, were both buried in the Rhondda, also owned Bronwydd House and Porth Park. It was officially opened by Tom Jones in 2000, by smashing a bottle of dandelion and burdock against its walls.

The weekly shows were first broadcast by BBC1 Wales before being picked up by HTV/ITV Wales. The show was presented by Steve Jones and Liz Fuller, with Welsh bands like Feeder, Stereophonics, Kosheen and The Kennedy Soundtrack appearing. More mainstream pop acts like Sophie Ellis-Bextor, Mis-teeq and S Club 7 also appeared. There was also a Welsh language show, Sesiwn Hwyr, broadcast by S4C. In 2008 the show disappeared with no official reason given and no new series have been screened, though performances from the early BBC shows have been used in BBC Four music compilations such as St David's Day at the BBC.

The Pop Factory was also the studio home of local musical entrepreneur Rob Reed of Magenta fame.

In 2011 the site was bought by Valleys Kids and is used as an office, hub and live venue.

== Pop Factory Awards ==
Every year, TPF hosted an award ceremony, which in 2005 was focused mainly on the Welsh music scene, possibly due to the axing of The Welsh Music Awards. This did not happen in its entirety in 2006 but went back to its full Welsh format in 2007. The 2007 event was also launched in conjunction with XFM Wales.

=== Previous winners ===
==== 2007 ====
- Best live act: Funeral for a Friend
- Best live event: The Full Ponty
- Rock 'n' roll excess award: Dirty Sanchez
- Best new act: Kids in Glass Houses
- Best album: Stereophonics: Pull the Pin
- Best Welsh band: Manic Street Preachers
- Best international artist/Export: The Automatic
- Contribution to the music industry: Martin Hall
- Outstanding contribution to music: Mike Peters
- Best performance on The Guest List: The Enemy
- Best Welsh language act: Sibrydion, Genod Droog
- Xfm Artist of the Year: The Wombats

==== 2006 ====
- Best live act: Lostprophets
- Best live event: Green Man Festival
- Rock 'n' roll excess award: The Automatic
- Best new act: The Blackout
- Best album: Lostprophets: Liberation Transmission
- Best Welsh band: Lostprophets
- Best international artist: Katherine Jenkins
- Contribution to the music industry: Marcus Russell
- Outstanding contribution to music: Lemmy
- Best performance on The Guest List: The Automatic
- Best Welsh language act: Frizbee
- Red Dragon artist of the year: The Feeling
- Community music award: Winner: Community Music Wales

==== 2005 ====
- Best Pop act: Liberty X
- Best Album: Feeder: Pushing The Senses
- Best Live act: Stereophonics
- Best Welsh band: Lostprophets
- Best Welsh language act: The Poppies
- Best Welsh export: Jem
- Best new act: The Automatic
- Best live event: Wakestock
- Best Performance on the Guest List: Bullet for My Valentine
- Outstanding contribution to music: Tom Jones
- Contribution to the music industry: Dai Davies
- Community music award: SONIG
- Rock and roll excess award: Goldie Lookin' Chain

==== 2004 ====
- Best Pop act: Estelle
- Best Album: Goldie Lookin' Chain: Greatest Hits
- Best Live act: Embrace
- Best Welsh band: Lostprophets
- Best new act: Along Came Man
- Outstanding contribution to music: Pino Paladino
- Contribution to the music industry: Greg Haver
- Community music award: Immtech
- Rock and roll excess award: Stuart Cable

==== 2003 ====
- Best Pop act: Blazin' Squad
- Best Album: Permission to Land by The Darkness
- Best Pop Factory Performance: The Darkness
- Best Live act: Super Furry Animals
- Best Pop Factory Debut: Funeral for a Friend
- Best New Talent: The Crimea
- Best Welsh Language Talent: Texas Radio Band
- Best Welsh Language New Talent: Jakokoyak
