= Henry Naunton Davies =

Welsh physician (1827–1899)

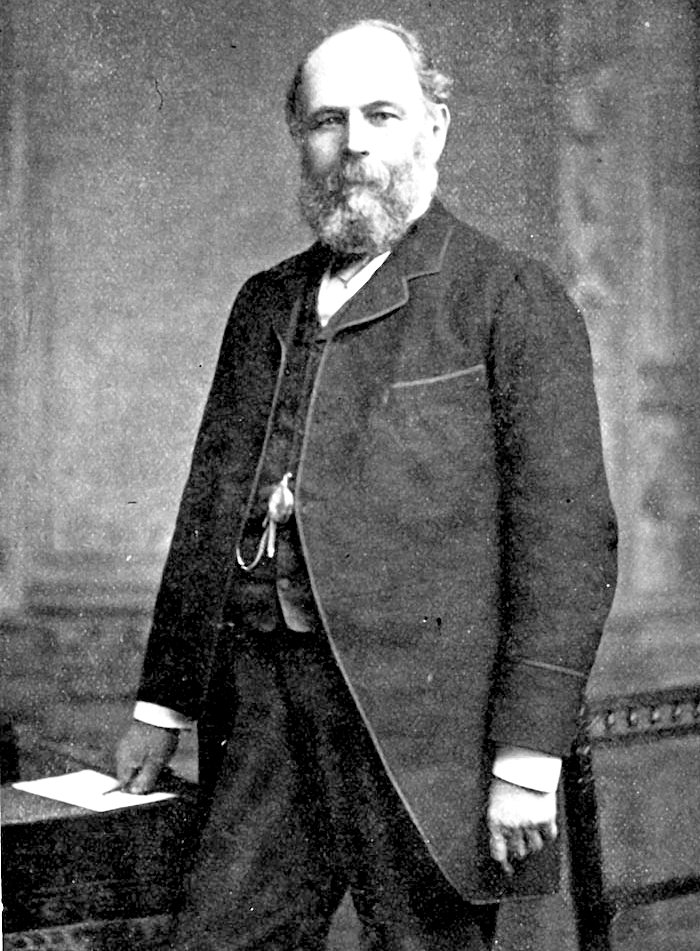

Henry Naunton Davies (1827 – 1899) was a Welsh physician, best known for his rescue efforts during the 1877 Tynewydd Colliery disaster. He was the first to receive the BMA Gold Medal.

Davies had sixteen years experience as a miner and strove tirelessly throughout his life to improve the health of the mining community. He was also a highly respected Justice of the Peace, a Liberal and a devout Christian.
