= With The Guns =

Studio album by The Guns
- Released: 17 July 2009
- Recorded: 2005–2007
- Genre: Rock, punk rock
- Producer: Richard Emanuel, Alex Wiltshire

The Guns chronology
The Guns (2006)	With The Guns (2009)	Treacle & Pie (2010)

With The Guns is the debut album from the Welsh rock quartet The Guns. Originally to be released in 2007 under German record label Motor Records, however, With The Guns was delayed for so long that The Guns decided to release it themselves. The album was finally released independently on 17 July 2009 through iTunes, and on 31 August 2009, 1000 copies of With The Guns CDs became available from their official website. Produced by Richard Emanuel & Alex Wiltshire at The Lodge Productions studio, With The Guns produced two music videos, one of which is often played on UK music channel, Lava TV.

== Track listing ==
1. "It's On Like Donkey Kong"
2. "No No Know"
3. "You Can Eff Right Off"
4. "Kings And Queens"
5. "Better Off Walking"
6. "Gordon's And Lemonade"
7. "North Or South"
8. "Überwoman"
9. "Third Strike"
10. "This Old House"
11. "Listen Up"
12. "A Year And Two Studios Ago"

== Videos ==
1. "Gordon's and Lemonade" (2006)
2. "It's On Like Donkey Kong" (2009)
