= The Guns (band) =

- Origin: Abertillery, Wales
- Genres: Rock; Power pop
- Years active: 2005–present
- Members: Alex Wiltshire; Adam Turner; Tom Coburn; Rhian Williams
- Past members: Andrew Robinson; Michael Leigh Gregory
- Website: The Guns

The Guns are a Welsh four-piece rock and power pop band from Abertillery, Wales. The current line-up consists of Alex Wiltshire (vocals and guitar), Adam Turner (lead guitar), Tom Coburn (bass guitar) and Chris 'Stix' Davies (drums). The band have stated that they would like to remain independent and have turned down numerous record deals as a result of that. As of 2012, The Guns have released two EPs, and two albums.

== History ==
=== Early years (2005–2007) ===
After the once popular South Wales band When Reason Sleeps, which contained the frontman for fellow Welsh band The Blackout, Sean Smith, broke up, lead singer Alex Wiltshire set out and recruited Adam Turner on lead guitar, Tom Coburn on bass guitar, and Kob on drums. The Guns were formed, and after a small amount of gigs, they were asked by Pontypridd band Lostprophets to support them during their Liberation Transmission tour, The Guns accepted the offer and went on to play on the main stage at The Full Ponty 2007. Also, during this period The Guns had started work on their debut album With The Guns, and had released a self-titled 3 track CD available through their Myspace and at gigs.

=== With The Guns (2007–2009) ===
After touring with Lostprophets, the band worked on With The Guns (produced by Richard Emanuel at The Lodge Productions studio), and in late 2008, shortly after completion of With The Guns, Andrew Robinson left the band and in early 2009, Michael Leigh Gregory was recruited to replace Robinson on drums. With The Guns was released on iTunes on 17 July 2009. The album was released independently by The Guns.

=== Fuck The Demon Outta Me (2011–present) ===
The Guns began work on their follow-up album in 2008, and the band announced on their Myspace page the title of their next album, If It Ain't Broke, Don't Fix It. They soon began touring, playing many shows, including their first Cardiff show in over a year, and shows with The Blackout, Funeral For A Friend, Bowling For Soup and CKY. In early 2010, Michael Lee Gregory was replaced by Rhian Williams and the band's music video for "Gordon's And Lemonade" began to appear on UK music channel, Lava TV. The Guns released the single "Treacle & Pie" on iTunes on 28 June 2010, with pre-order sales getting it to #58 after just its third day of availability. On 21 November 2011, The Guns released the now renamed "Fuck The Demon Outta Me" on iTunes, with 200 hand numbered physical copies made available through their bigcartel store. The first single featured on the album is "Missing Girls", a music video for which was released through the band's official website.

== Media interest ==
The Guns have attracted frequent interest from the media, including four appearances on ITV1's The Guestlist. Music magazines Kerrang! and Rock Sound have been following The Guns' progress during records, as well as live performances, and have given positive feedback about the band. The Guns also have given interviews and received articles in newspapers including Metro and the Western Mail.

== Discography ==
=== Albums ===
- The Guns (2006)
1. No No Know
2. Überwoman
3. Colder
- With The Guns (2009)
1. It's On Like Donkey Kong
2. No No Know
3. You Can Eff Right Off
4. Kings And Queens
5. Better Off Walking
6. Gordon's And Lemonade
7. North Or South
8. Überwoman
9. Third Strike
10. This Old House
11. Listen Up
12. A Year And Two Studios Ago
- Treacle & Pie (2010)
1. Treacle & Pie
2. Colder (Live)
3. No No Know (Acoustic)
4. Sometimes (Acoustic)
- Fuck The Demon Outta Me
1. Daughter Of A Bad Man
2. All Aboard
3. Treacle And Pie
4. Answers
5. Voodoo Boogie
6. You Drive And I'll Eat This
7. Missing Girls
8. Moan Kill You To
9. Nighty Night Creepin'
10. Stranger Than You

=== Singles ===
- "Gordon's And Lemonade" [taken from the album With The Guns] (2009)
- "It's On Like Donkey Kong" [taken from the album With The Guns] (2010)
- "Treacle & Pie" (2010)
- "Missing Girls" [taken from the album Fuck The Demon Outta Me] (2011)

=== Videos ===
- "Gordon's And Lemonade" [taken from the album With The Guns] (2009)
- "It's On Like Donkey Kong" [taken from the album With The Guns] (2010)
- "Missing Girls" [taken from the album Fuck The Demon Outta Me] (2011)
