= St Mary's Abbey ruins, Bardsey Island =

St Mary's Abbey ruins
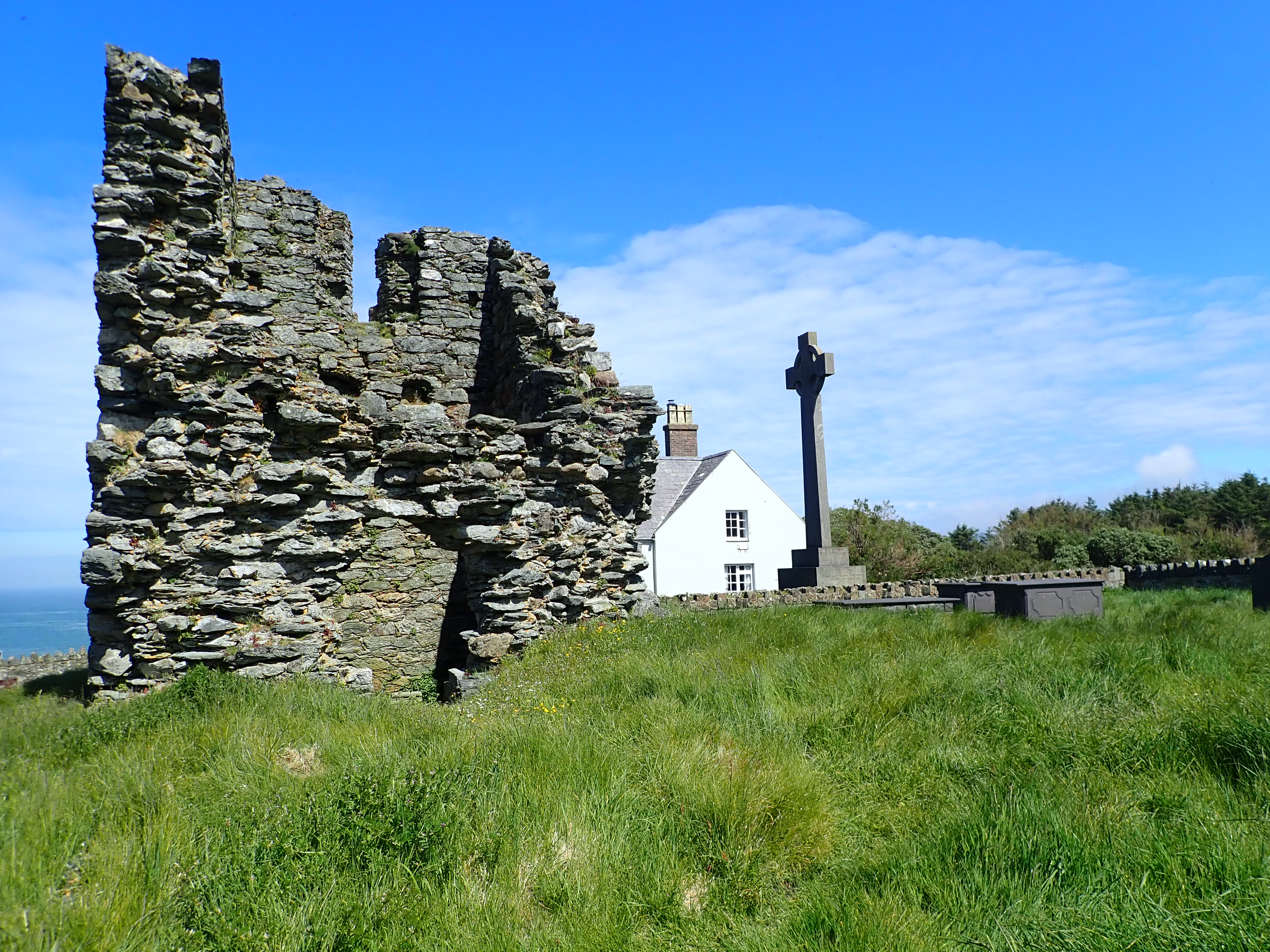

- Location within Gwynedd
- 52.7643°N 4.7877°W
- Type: Abbey
- Location: Bardsey Island, Aberdaron, Gwynedd, Wales

History
- Built: 11th century onwards

Site notes
- Governing body: Privately owned

Listed Building – Grade I
- Official name: Ruin of Abbey of St Mary
- Designated: 19 October 1971
- Reference no.: 4232

Scheduled monument
- Official name: St Mary's Abbey, Bardsey Island
- Reference no.: CN068

Listed Building – Grade II
- Official name: Memorial Cross in graveyard centre
- Designated: 26 June 1998
- Reference no.: 20050

Listed Building – Grade II
- Official name: Memorial Cross in graveyard to south
- Designated: 26 June 1998
- Reference no.: 20051

Listed Building – Grade II
- Official name: Newborough Cross
- Designated: 26 June 1998
- Reference no.: 20052

The ruins of the Abbey of St Mary stand at the northern end of Bardsey Island, south-west of the Lleyn Peninsula, in Gwynedd, Wales. The site has had religious importance from at least the 6th century when Saint Cadfan founded an abbey there. In the following centuries the island became an important place of pilgrimage and 20,000 saints are reputedly buried on the island. By the end of the Middle Ages the abbey had declined in importance and, following the dissolution of the monasteries, fell into ruin. In the 18th century, more substantial remains were still standing, but by the 20th only the current remnant of a tower remained. The ruins are a Grade II* listed building and a scheduled monument. Three Celtic crosses set among the ruins are listed at Grade II.

== History and description ==
Saint Cadfan is reputed to have arrived on the island in the 5th century and the following centuries saw it become a place of high importance as a centre for pilgrimage and as a sanctuary for Christians escaping persecution. St Cadfal is said to have built the first abbey on the St Mary's site. Dubricius, Archbishop of Caerleon, who had resigned in favour of Saint David, retired to Bardsey.

It became a centre of the Culdee order, an ascetic Christian order that originated in Ireland. It was mentioned by Gerald of Wales in Itinerarium Cambriae as a community of "very religious monks". By the High Middle Ages the island was reputedly the burial place of some 20,000 saints. It became one of the three Welsh pilgrimage sites of national importance, and Edward I visited in 1284. (Note: The other sites of national import were St Davids and Holywell.) The dissolution of the monasteries saw the destruction of the abbey, and it subsequently fell into ruins. By the 20th century, only the fragment of one tower remained. Richard Haslam, Julian Orbach and Adam Voelcker, in their 2009 edition Gwynedd, in the Buildings of Wales series, note its setting within a walled enclosure.

The Royal Commission on the Ancient and Historical Monuments of Wales records the dimensions of the "two-stage" tower as 5.8m square with 1.0m thick walls and standing 8.0m high. The ruins are a Grade I listed building, and a Scheduled monument. Three Celtic crosses within the abbey grounds are listed at Grade II.

== Sources ==
- Haslam, Richard; Orbach, Julian; Voelcker, Adam (2009). Gwynedd. The Buildings of Wales. New Haven, US and London: Yale University Press. ISBN 978-0-300-14169-6. OCLC 1023292902.
