= Ysgol Gyfun Cwm Rhondda =

Coordinates: 51.605°N 3.415°W

Location
- Heol Graigwen; Porth, Rhondda Cynon Taf; Wales

Information
- Type: Secondary School
- Status: Open
- Head teacher: Craig Spanswick
- Grades: 7-13
- Gender: Male/female
- Language: Welsh
- Colors: Blue & white (Sixth Form = white & black )
- Nickname: Cymer, YG Cymer, Cwm Rhondda
- Website: www.ygcwmrhondda.cymru

Ysgol Gyfun Cwm Rhondda (English: Cwm Rhondda Secondary School) is a Welsh-medium secondary school located in the county borough of Rhondda Cynon Taf, situated near Porth.

== History ==
Ysgol Gyfun Cymer Rhondda was established in 1988 in response to the growing demand for Welsh-medium education in the area. It remains the only Welsh-medium secondary School in the Rhondda, with around 800 students. Pupils who attend the school come from all over the Rhondda, from five Welsh primary schools:

- Llyn-Y-Forwyn (Ferndale)
- Ynyswen (Ynyswen)
- Llwyncelyn (Porth)
- Bronllwyn (Gelli)
- Bodringallt (Ystrad)

Cymer was renamed Ysgol Gyfun Cwm Rhondda by RCT Council on the 1st of September 2017.

== Ysgol Gyfun Cwm Rhondda in the media ==
Ysgol Gyfun Cwm Rhondda appeared in the popular show "Pam fi Duw?" on Welsh television channel S4C. The long-running show gained a large Rhondda fan base, from both English- and Welsh-speaking people, because it was featured in a place they knew. For seven weeks of the year HTV used the school campus, and 200 of the school's pupils were extras.

More recently the school again featured on S4C in "Cymer Fi", which followed six students as they completed various challenges and tasks. The programme followed the students as they went through singing coaching, quitting smoking, behavioural problems and rugby aspirations.

== Ysgol Gyfun Cwm Rhondda rugby ==
Cwm Rhondda has a tradition of rugby union and has a number of former pupils playing in the Welsh leagues. A number of pupils have reached international level at different age groups, with former pupil Geraint Morris playing for Welsh regional side the Celtic Warriors in the European Heineken Cup.

Three sixth-form students (Geraint Evans, Liam H. Thomas and Ashley Bateman) were selected for the Wales U/18 Rugby League squad. Evans and Bateman played against the North of England side in Manchester (November 2006). Evans also represented Wales U/19 against Australia (November 2006). Former pupil Sean Paul Rees was also selected for the Wales U/17 Rugby Union squad. Will Grif John was selected for the Welsh rugby union U20s squad and turned professional for the Cardiff Blues.
