= Porth =

Town in Rhondda Cynon Taf, Wales

Porth: Welsh: Y Porth
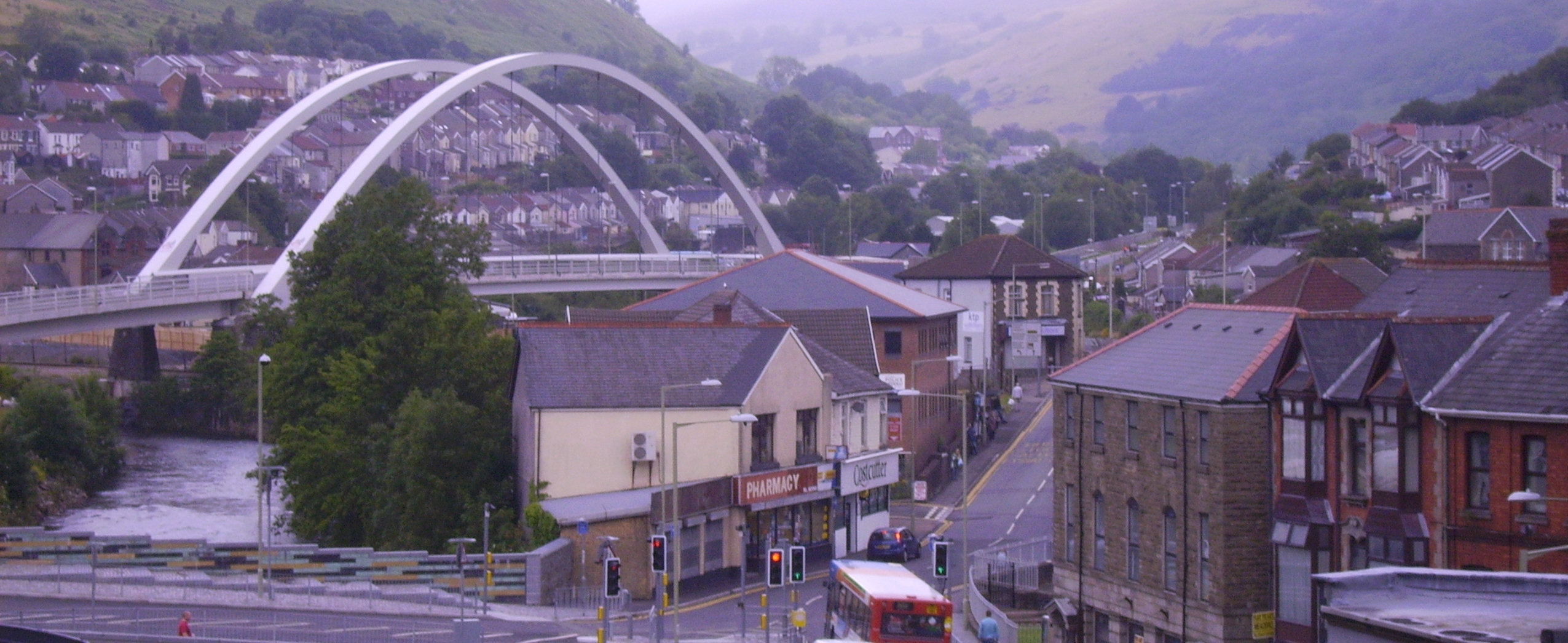
- Rheola Bridge, Porth

- Location within Rhondda Cynon Taf
- Population: 5,970 (2011)
- OS grid reference: ST025915
- Principal area: Rhondda Cynon Taf
- Preserved county: Mid Glamorgan
- Country: Wales
- Sovereign state: United Kingdom
- Post town: PORTH
- Postcode district: CF39
- Dialling code: 01443
- Police: South Wales
- Fire: South Wales
- Ambulance: Welsh
- UK Parliament: Rhondda
- Senedd Cymru – Welsh Parliament: Rhondda
- List of places UK Wales Rhondda Cynon Taf 51.6138°N 3.4095°W Community map: Map of the community

Porth (Welsh: Y Porth) is a town and community in the county borough of Rhondda Cynon Taf, within the historic county boundaries of Glamorgan, Wales. Lying in the Rhondda Valley, it is regarded as the gateway connecting the Rhondda Fawr and Rhondda Fach valleys due to both valleys meeting at Porth. The Welsh word "porth" means "gate". Porth is a predominantly English-speaking community.

Neighbouring villages include Trealaw, Trebanog, Trehafod and Ynyshir.

== History ==
=== Early history ===
During prehistoric times the area now known as Porth was an uninhabited wooded area. Although there is evidence of settlements in the upper reaches of the valley, only cairns used as way-markers have been discovered on the higher points in the Porth area. During the medieval period the area came under the commote of Glynrhondda within the cantref of Penychen, though the area remained uninhabited. Although there were no permanent buildings of note at this time, it is known that the area would have experienced travelers with two bridges built over the River Rhondda at Porth, the Pont Rheola and Pont y Cymmer. Both bridges date to at least the 1530s when they were mentioned by antiquary John Leland. These bridges were wooden in construct and were later rebuilt in stone. The first buildings of note in the region were built to the south of Porth in the community known today as Cymmer, mainly a chapel, Capel y Cymmer (1743) and a mill on the south bank of the River Rhondda. By the 18th century there were a handful of farm houses, mainly in the northern slopes of Llwyncelyn. During this pre-industrial era, the locale was known as Cymmer, an old Welsh word that describes the point where two rivers converge. It was only during the industrial period that the mining operations of the Porth Estate and the subsequently named railway station that saw the name Porth adopted.

=== Industrial growth ===
In 1809, Walter Coffin sunk the first coal pit in the Rhondda, further up the valley in Dinas, but a lack of a transportation network greatly affected the profitability of coal mining as an industry in the region. Coffin tackled this problem by constructing a one-mile tramline which connected his mines in Dinas to a tramline built by Dr. Richard Griffiths at Denia (modern spelling Dynea) (Pontypridd), which linked to a private canal that joined onto the Glamorganshire Canal at Treforest. Coffin's tramline followed the southern bank of the River Rhondda and ran through Porth. The existence of the tramline made the development of the Porth and Cymmer region far more attractive, and by the middle of the 19th century there was an impetus to expand coal mining in the area. In 1841 Richard Lewis joined Coffin in trying to exploit the region with his level built at Cymmer. This resulted in the construction of around fifty miners' cottages, several of which were located in Porth. In 1844 Lewis Edwards of Newport and George Gethin of Penygraig opened a small level at Nyth-bran on the eastern borders of Porth, the villages' first coal mine. This was followed in 1845 by the sinking of the Porth Colliery by David James of Merthyr, the success of which saw him build the Llwyncelyn Colliery in 1851, also in Porth. By 1850 the Taff Vale Railway had been extended to Cymmer replacing the tramline, allowing direct access between the lower Rhondda and the ports of Cardiff.

In 1850 the Troedyrhiw Colliery (later to become the Aber-Rhondda Colliery), which was sunk on the northern borders of Porth and the neighbouring village of Ynyshir by Leonard Hadley of Caerleon five years earlier, came into the ownership of a new consortium known as the Troedyrhiw Coal Company. This company was formed by James Thomas, a former miner, Matthew Cop, a Cardiff docksman and John Lewis, a grocer from Aberdare. In 1852 the same company opened the Tynewydd Colliery at the junction of the Rhondda Fawr and Fach rivers, Porth's fourth mine. The mine quickly struck the Rhondda No. 3 seam, and coking ovens were built at the surface, providing further employment.

With the increase in population, transport links began to improve in the Rhondda. This was hampered by subsidence caused the mining underground, which resulted in the roads of Porth Square sinking by eight foot. In 1860 a two horsed omnibus service was introduced between Porth and Pontypridd, but was replaced by a system of horsedrawn tramcars in 1888. Although the tramline and subsequently the railway had passed through Porth for two decades, servicing the collieries, it was not until 1861 that the village had its first railway station; and a passenger service did not commence until January 1863.

As the population continued to increase, businesses and infrastructure grew around the coal industry. The Rhondda Urban Council chose Porth as one of two sites to build gas works and the area around Porth Square and Hannah Street became the commercial centre of the village. One of the more notable businesses to open in Porth was the Thomas & Evans grocers one of the first of a chain of shops owned by William Thomas and William Evans two entrepreneurs from Pembrokeshire. Evans became an important figure in the growth of Porth, and in the late 1890s he opened a jam factory and the Welsh Hills Mineral Water factory, later to become Corona carbonated drinks which would remain a major manufacturer within the village up until the 1980s.

Coal mining in the Rhondda continued to expand throughout the early 20th century, although no further mines were sunk in Porth. The population continued to grow but conditions became hard after the Great Depression, and by the mid 1920s unemployment among mine workers rocketed. Matters worsened after the disastrous general strike of 1926 which saw many miners out of work for months. As mechanisation allowed other mining areas to become more profitable, the antiquated Rhondda mines sunk nearly 75 years earlier were unable to modernise and one-by-one began to close. Porth, like the rest of the Rhondda, was built solely around the coal industry, and with its collapse came mass unemployment, resulting in economic migration. There was a brief respite during the Second World War, when employment rose sharply. This was partially due for a need for Rhondda steam coal, but also due to large munition factories built in Bridgend, Hirwaun and Treforest to which the workers commuted. With the end of the war it was apparent that unemployment would return, but to ensure that the newly found factory skills gained during the previous six years were not lost the British Government passed the Distribution of Industry Act in 1945. This saw 25 new industry come to the Rhondda, six of them based in Porth. They ranged from Messrs. Jacob Beatus' box making company, a metal toy factory and a branch of Remploy aimed at disabled workers.

=== Tynewydd Colliery disaster ===
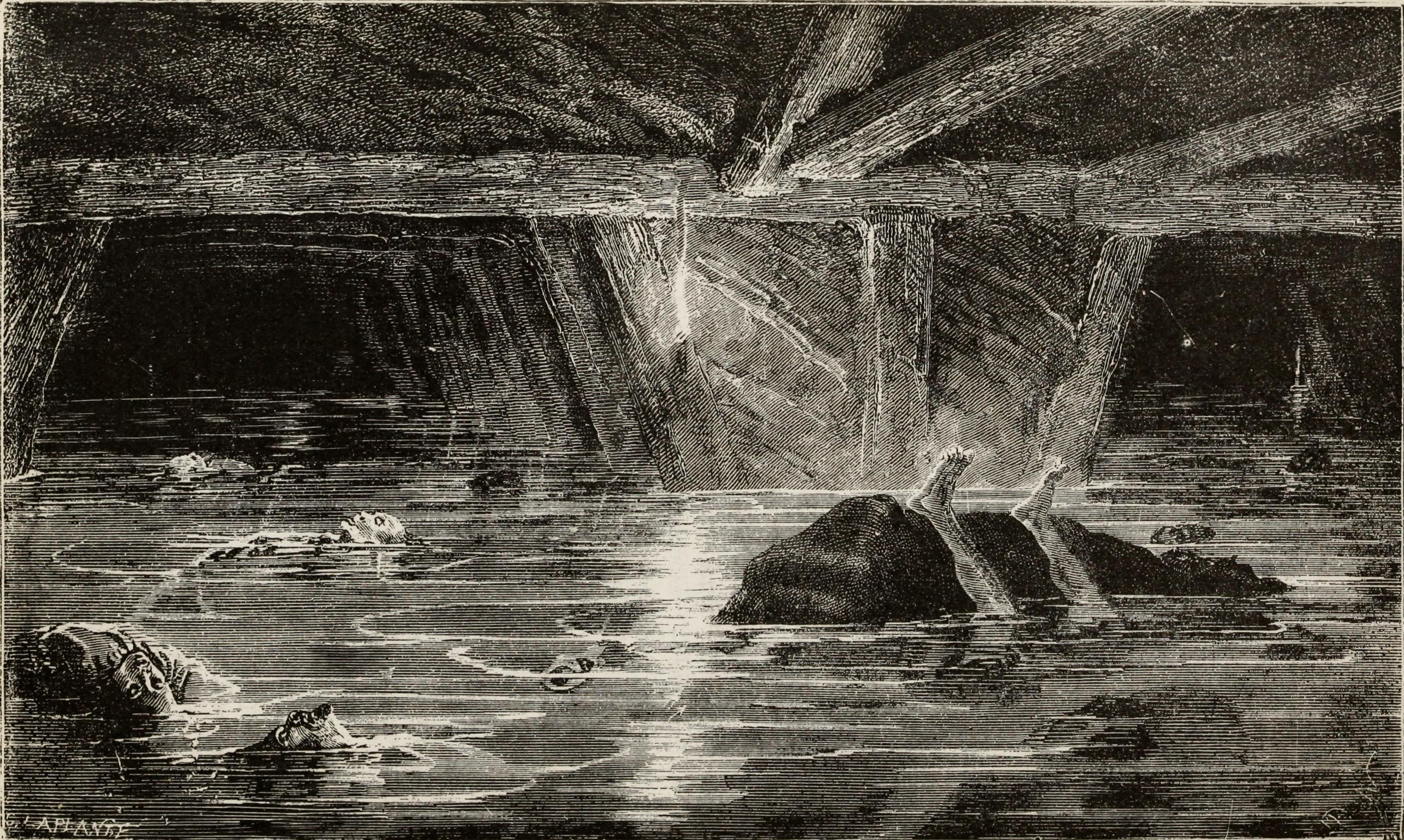
Tynewydd Colliery disaster at Porth 1877

On 11 April 1877 the Tynewydd Colliery 51°36′53″N 3°24′42″W - was the scene of a mine disaster that led to a notable mine rescue operation following which four first-class and twenty-one second-class Albert Medals for Lifesaving were awarded. A build-up of water in old workings of the neighbouring Cymmer Colliery resulted in flooding of the Tynewydd mine. Only fourteen of approximately 100 miners employed at the mine were working underground at the time of the accident.

Four of the trapped miners were rescued after eighteen hours but a fifth, William Morgan, was crushed to death by an escape of compressed air. Four other miners were drowned. The remaining five, Dafydd Jenkins, Moses Powell, George Jenkins, John Thomas and the boy David Hughes, were located behind a thirty-eight yards thick barrier of coal with a large quantity of water and compressed air and probably gas behind it. It took four days to cut through the barrier until on 19 April only a few yards remained. At this stage operations were halted because there was a danger of pent-up water behind the barrier bursting through. In spite of this danger four, or alternatively five, of the rescuers volunteered to continue, according to some reports Daniel Thomas, Isaac Pride, John William Howell and William Beith. There is some confusion over the number and names of the rescuers - Daniel Thomas, listed as one of those awarded the first-class medal, is referred to as owner of Brithweunydd Level, the Tynewydd colliery owner is reported to have been considered for but not awarded a first-class medal because of his impending trial on manslaughter charges of which he was acquitted, and Gwilym Thomas is seen in a photograph of "three of the rescuers" with Isaac Pride and Abraham "Abby" Dodd,. An escape of inflammable gas under pressure extinguished the rescue team's Davy lamps but they continued working in darkness. At 3.00 p.m. on 20 April the breakthrough occurred.

Because of the problems posed by the potential escape of air under pressure, the mine engineers erected stout air doors to contain any escaping air and gas and confine possible explosions. One was built within a yard of the face. Isaac Pride who volunteered to break through the barrier had to work within a very confined space. A blast of air was released as his pick broke through and threw him back against the air door, but he quickly set about enlarging the hole, assisted by "Abby" Dodd. They found the five trapped miners too weak to stand. Between them Pride and Dodd pulled the five to safety as the water level rose. It is claimed that "Abby" Dodd was not awarded an Albert Medal because of an interview he gave to a journalist criticising the colliery owners, at a time when there had been considerable conflict in the Welsh coal mines between miners and owners.

The Albert Medals awarded at Tynewydd were the first awarded for gallantry on land. The medal had been introduced a decade earlier to honour heroic lifesaving efforts in rescues at sea. The Albert Medal First Class awarded to William Beith can be seen as part of the permanent exhibition in the Coins and Medals Gallery at the National Museum of Wales in Cathays Park, Cardiff. William Beith was a mechanical engineer at Harris's Navigation Colliery, Quaker's Yard, Merthyr Tydfil. In addition, the colliery doctor, Dr. Henry Naunton Davies, was awarded the first British Medical Association Gold Medal for his work during the disaster.

== Present day ==
Today the main internal economy of Porth is retail and the centre of Porth is home to the shopping district based around Hannah Street. Most other businesses are located on nearby Pontypridd Road and Porth Street. Porth is home to around 6,000 people living in different areas of the town, namely Birchgrove, Britannia, Glynfach, Llwyncelyn, Mount Pleasant and Porth town centre.

Porth crater on Mars is named after the town.

== Education ==
Secondary school age children are most likely to attend Porth County Community School an English medium school, or Ysgol Gyfun Cwm Rhondda which is a Welsh-medium school, situated in the Cymer area of Porth.

== Transport ==
Porth railway station has services to Treherbert and Cardiff on the Rhondda Line. Transport for Wales is responsible for the railway service available in Porth.

The construction of the Porth-Tylorstown bypass (Porth Relief Road) has caused traffic jams and detours. The bypass was opened on 28 December 2006 but landscaping work finished in April 2007.

== Sport and leisure ==
The town is also the home of The Pop Factory, opened in 2000 with an opening ceremony attended by Tom Jones, Cerys Matthews and Kelly Jones. It is both a television studio and recording studio. The owners of the building also contribute to the local area, and organised the Tom Jones homecoming concert at Ynysangharad Park, Pontypridd, in May 2005. In 2026 its owners "Valley Kids" put The Pop Factory up for sale, with a group of artists, organisations and local residents hoping to buy it and bring it into community ownership.

Porth is home to Welsh Rugby Union affiliated rugby club Porth Harlequins.

Football Association of Wales affiliated A.F.C. Porth play their home matches at Dinas Park and their base is the Wyndham Constitutional Club.

Porth is home to South Wales Automobile Club, (S.W.A.C.), SWAC are the organisers of the Welsh Rally. 'The Welsh Rally', as the event is often referred to, first ran in 1937 and has seen many top international rally drivers taking part over the years.

== Notable people ==
See Category:People from Porth

- Noah Ablett, a trade unionist and political theorist
- Margaret Bevan, girl evangelist, was born in Porth
- Llew Edwards, British featherweight boxing champion
- J. Gwyn Griffiths, Egyptologist, poet and Welsh nationalist
- Cliff Jones Wales international rugby captain
- Percy Jones, World Boxing Flyweight champion
- David Lyn, stage and television actor
- Gwyn Thomas, novelist in the English language

== Bibliography ==
- Bacchetta, Aldo; Rudd, Glyn (2000). Porth, Gateway to the Rhondda. Stroud: Tempus. ISBN 0-7524-2161-1.
- Davies, John; Jenkins, Nigel; Menna, Baines; Lynch, Peredur I., eds. (2008). The Welsh Academy Encyclopaedia of Wales. Cardiff: University of Wales Press. ISBN 978-0-7083-1953-6.
- Davis, Paul R. (1989). Historic Rhondda. Hackman. ISBN 0-9508556-3-4.
- Evans, C.J.O. (1948). Glamorgan, its History and Topography. Cardiff: William Lewis.
- Lewis, E.D. (1959). The Rhondda Valleys. London: Phoenix House.
- Lewis, E.D. (1975). Roy Denning (ed.). Glamorgan Historian, Volume Eleven. Barry: Stewart Williams. ISBN 0-900807-21-0.
- Williams, Chris (1996). Democratic Rhondda, Politics and Society, 1885-1951. Cardiff: University of Wales Press. ISBN 0-7083-1334-5.
