= Jakokoyak =

- Origin: Cardiff, Wales
- Years active: 2003–2010
- Label: Peski Records

Jakokoyak was a project created by Welsh musician and producer Rhys Edwards, with leanings towards psychedelic folk, sometimes classified as folktronica and lo-fi experimental electronic music. Edwards also ran the now defunct Peski Records label. He is married to musician Gwenno Saunders and lives in Cardiff, Wales.

== Career ==
A native of Mold, Flintshire and raised on Anglesey, Edwards began recording in his second year of university. Working and recording alone, he began exploring old keyboards and effects pedals. It was these recordings that subsequently gave him the passport to a postgraduate music course at Bangor.

In 2003 he released his debut album, Am Cyfan Dy Pethau Prydferth (the title was taken from a badly translated poster on the walls of the Cardiff Union). In the same year he won a Pop Factory award for Best New Talent, and Am Cyfan... was awarded Best Album at BBC Radio Cymru's 2003 music awards.

The album was re-released in Japan in 2004 and was warmly received in Japanese magazines such as Vogue Nippon.

After a string of releases, Jakokoyak supported the Super Furry Animals on their tour of Japan, which was followed with the release of theFlatyre EP (2006), of which its lead track "Eira" was voted Record of the Week on London's Xfm radio station.

Jakokoyak released a second album Aerophlot in 2010, a collection of songs recorded between 2006 and 2008.

== Discography ==
=== Albums ===
- Am Cyfan Dy Pethau Prydferth (August 2003; Japanese re-release August 2004)
- Aerophlot (August 2010)

=== EPs ===
- Flatyre (March 2006)
- Look Away Now (If You Don't Want to Know the Score) (November 2008)

=== Compilations ===
- A Step in the Left Direction (Boobytrap Records) (August 2001)
- New Welsh Talent 2003 - Music Week Magazine (August 2003)
- Gigs, Chips a 'Trip' Mewn Tacsi! (August 2004)
- Dan y Cownter (August 2005)
- Folk Off! (Sunday Best label) (July 2006)
- "Rallye Cloak 03: Goodbye Blue Monday (Rallye Records, JAPAN)" (October 2008)
- Respond (Amgueddfa Cymru) (March 2009)
