= Hywel ab Owain =

Welsh king (990–1043)

Hywel ab Owain was a Welsh king of a part of Glywysing from about 990 until his death in 1043. He was a king, as well as a poet.
