= Cynfyn =

Cynfyn Conbinus
- King of Ergyng
- Reign: c. 585 – c. 615
- Predecessor: Peibio Clafrog
- Successor: Gwrfoddw
- Issue: Gwrgan Fawr
- Father: Peibio Clafrog

King Cynfyn (Latin: Conbinus; died c. 615) was the King of Ergyng, a kingdom of south-east Wales in the early medieval period. He was the son of Peibio Clafrog.

== Life ==
Little is known of Cynfyn ap Peibio apart from the evidence of later medieval genealogies. He appears a number of times in the Llandaff Charters, particularly in association with Bishop Aeddan and Bishop Elwystl.
