= Penychen =

Welsh medieval cantref and legendary kingdom

Coordinates: 51.560°N 3.409°W

Penychen was a possible minor kingdom of early medieval Wales and later a cantref of the Kingdom of Morgannwg. Penychen was one of three cantrefi that made up the kingdom of Glywysing, lying between the rivers Taff and Thaw, the other two being Gwynllwg and Gorfynydd. According to tradition, these cantrefi were created on the death of Glywys (c.480 AD), the first king of Glywysing, when the kingdom was divided between his three sons: Pawl, Gwynllyw and Mechwyn. But our knowledge of the early history of the kingdom is very uncertain, being mainly sourced from medieval documents and traditional pedigrees.

Pawl was the ruler of Penychen and on his death (c.540 AD) passed the cantref on to his nephew.

Pawl's brother Gwynllyw was the ruler of Gwynllwg and upon his death it is said that the cantref passed to his son Cadoc (Cadwg), also known as St. Cadoc. Cadoc would later take control of Penychen, but when he was killed by the Saxons he had no heirs, and both cantrefi fell under the control of Meureg of Gwent and were absorbed into his kingdom.

After the Norman conquest of South Wales, the southern parts of Penychen, on the Bristol Channel, came under the direct rule of the Norman Marcher Lords and their descendants, but the rest (the commotes of Rhondda Valley and Miskin) remained under the rule of local Welsh lords, who paid homage to the powerful Norman lords but still retained a degree of independence, which they were very ready to defend.

In the Middle Ages Penychen contained two important ecclesiastical centres: the episcopal seat of Llandaf, and Llancarfan, a clas connected to the early author Caradoc of Llancarfan.

== Location ==
Penychen lay between Senghenydd and Gwrinydd in South Wales; it contained the areas which today are the county borough of Rhondda Cynon Taff, the majority of the Vale of Glamorgan and the west of Cardiff.
