= Athrwys ap Meurig =

- Prince of Gwent
- Reign: c. 520
- Predecessor: Meurig ap Tewdrig
- Born: c. 505
- Died: c. 555
- Father: Meurig ap Tewdrig

Athrwys ap Meurig (Welsh pronunciation: [ˈaθrʊɨ̯s ap ˈməɨ̯rɪɡ];c. 505–555) was a prince, and possibly king, of Gwent and Glywysing in Wales. He was the son of King Meurig ap Tewdrig and the father of the later king Morgan ab Athrwys. It is possible he died before his father Meurig and did not live to rule as king himself.

== History ==
Athrwys's name is spelled variously. It is spelled Atroys (where -t- stands for the sound /θ/) in the 10th century Welsh Harleian genealogies and Athruis in the early medieval Latin Liber Landavensis. The name is etymologically related to that of the figure Andres[us] (where -d- stands for the sound /ð/) son of Morcant[us] who appears in the early medieval Latin Life of St Cadoc, concluding that both names derive from an Archaic Welsh spelling *Antrēs.

He was the son of Meurig ap Tewdrig, a King of Gwent and Glywysing in South Wales. His mother was Onbrawst, daughter of Gwrgan Fawr, King of Ergyng. His siblings were Idnerth and Ffriog. His wife may have been Cenedlon ferch Briafael Frydig, though it has also been suggested that she was the wife of a later king of this dynasty; his children included Morgan ab Athrwys, later a king of Gwent, as well as Ithel and Gwaidnerth. While Athrwys's father Meurig and son Morgan are named as kings in the Book of Llandaff, Athrwys is only named as a king of Gwent in a charter which is believed to be spurious (on chronological grounds, due to the witnesses of the charter). Wendy Davies concluded that Athrwys predeceased his father and thus never ruled as king, and when Meurig died after a long reign the kingship passed to Morgan. Davies suggests Athrwys lived between about 605 and 655.

His son was Morgan ab Athrwys. Morgan was King of Morgannwg, or Gwent and Glywysing, land as far west as the River Loughor or possibly the River Neath, and also encompassing land beyond the River Wye, into the old Kingdom of Ergyng, South Herefordshire.

== Arthurian connection ==
Some writers have identified Athrwys ap Meurig as a potential historical basis for King Arthur. This identification is found at least as early as Thomas Carte's A General History of England, written in 1747. It was later put forward and popularised by William Owen Pughe in 1803. The theory subsequently gained more popularity during the 19th century.

Proponents of the identification of Athrwys ap Meurig with Arthur generally point to the fact that Athrwys was a prince (and possibly king) of Glywysing, Gwent and Ergyng, which is where King Arthur is placed in many sources. For example, Geoffrey of Monmouth describes Caerleon-upon-Usk as Arthur's main city, and the pre-Galfridian Life of St Cadoc also places Arthur in this region. Proponents of this theory argue that Athrwys lived in the sixth century, not the seventh century as is commonly believed by scholars. Thus, they argue that Athrwys lived at the same time as Arthur and in the same place as Arthur, indicating that they were, in reality, the same person.

== Sources ==
- Bartrum, Peter C. (1993). A Welsh Classical Dictionary (PDF). Aberystwyth: National Library of Wales. p. 136.
- Davies, Wendy, The Llandaff Charters, National Library of Wales, 1979.
- Sims-Williams, Patrick, "The Emergence of Old Welsh, Cornish and Breton Orthography, 600-800: the evidence of Archaic Old Welsh", Bulletin of the Board of Celtic Studies, V. 38, 1991, p. 52
- Williams, David. (1796). The History of Monmouthshire.
