= The Full Ponty =

Music festival in Pontypridd, Wales

The Full Ponty was a music festival first held in Pontypridd on the 27–28 May 2006. The name Full Ponty is a pun on Full Monty, and Ponty, the local nickname of the town. The festival is associated with The Pop Factory and is held at Ynysangharad Park, with additional "Fringe" events taking place at various venues throughout Pontypridd, including comedy, and up-and-coming bands. The event's organisers stated a lack of big-name acts as the reason for no Full Ponty 2008 but then promised that it would return in 2009, though no further festivals have been held since. The TV show that launched the event (The Pop Factory) is also no longer in existence, which was another factor in the demise of the event.

== 2006 Line-up ==
Day one:

- Feeder
- Goldie Lookin' Chain
- Delays
- The Automatic
- The Heights
- The Poppies

Day two:

- Funeral for a Friend
- Biffy Clyro
- Fightstar
- Bring Me the Horizon
- Panel
- The Blackout
- Days In December

== 2007 line-up ==
The 2007 Full Ponty marked the second year of the event and took place on one day, rather than two on 26 May. The previous year saw all bands perform on a single stage over two days; the second year however saw more stages on a single day.

=== Main Stage ===
- Lostprophets
- The Automatic
- Reel Big Fish
- The Blackout
- The Guns
- The New 1920
- Miss Conduct

=== Atrium Stage ===
- Paramore
- Kids In Glass Houses
- Silverstein
- Dopamine
- The Ghost Of A Thousand
- Eric Unseen

=== Coca-Cola Stage ===
- Gallows
- The Future
- Viva Machine
- Gethin Pearson And The Scenery
- Along Came Man
- Friends Electric
- 84MM

=== Fringe events ===
- Head Automatica
- Henry Rollins
