= Dubricius =

Sub-Roman Welsh bishop and saint

Saint Dubricius
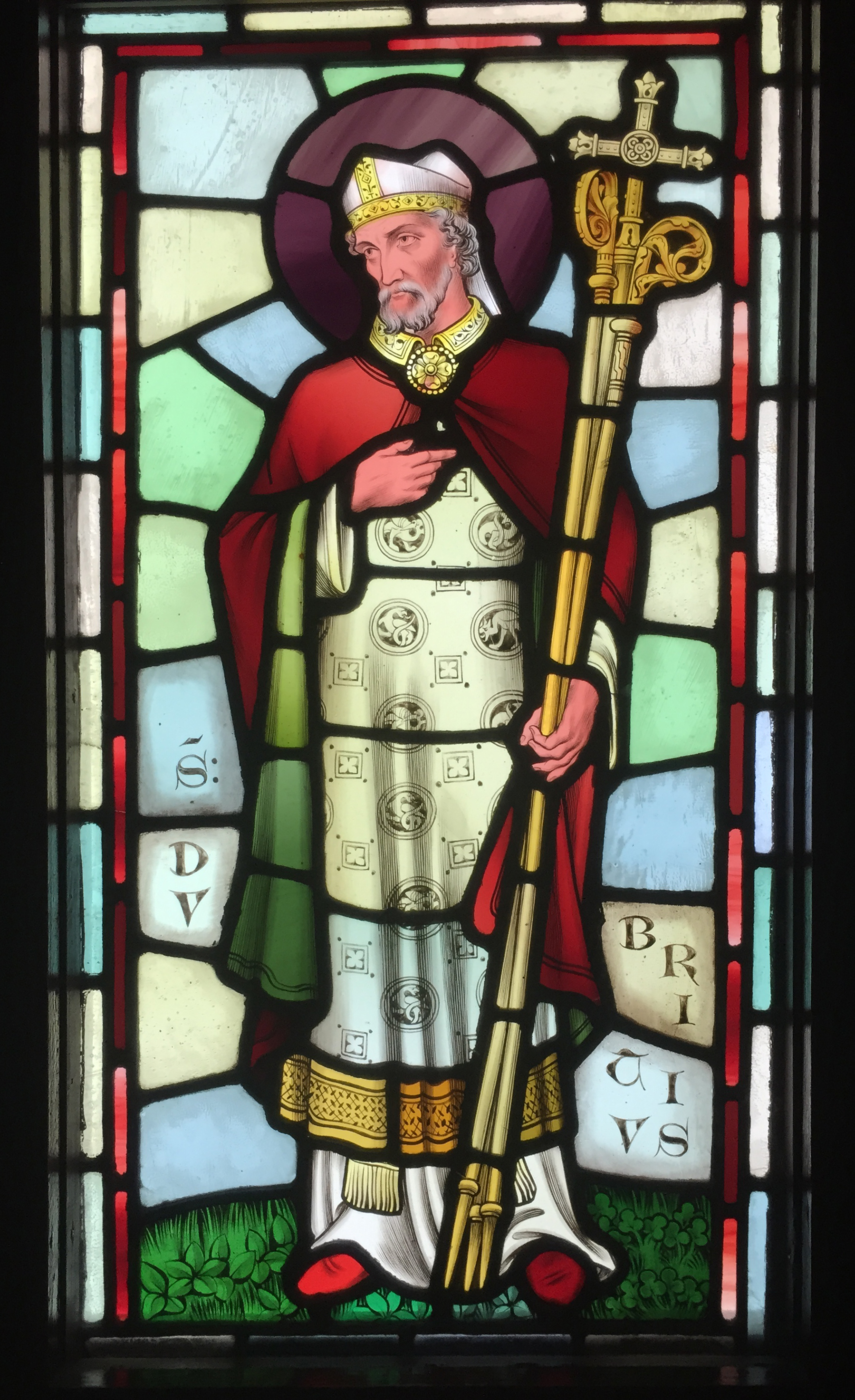
- Stained glass depiction of Dubricius, designed by William Burges, at Castell Coch, Cardiff

Archbishop
- Born: 465(?); Madley, near Hereford, Herefordshire, England
- Died: 550; Bardsey Island, Wales
- Venerated in: Eastern Orthodox Church; Roman Catholic Church; Anglican Communion
- Feast: 14 November
- Attributes: holding two crosiers and an archiepiscopal cross

Dubricius or Dubric (Welsh: Dyfrig; Norman-French: Devereux; c. 465 – c. 550) was a 6th-century British ecclesiastic venerated as a saint. He was the evangelist of Ergyng (Welsh: Erging) (later Archenfield, Herefordshire) and much of south-east Wales.

== Biography ==
Dubricius was the illegitimate son of Efrddyl, the daughter of King Peibio Clafrog of Ergyng. His grandfather threw his mother into the River Wye when he discovered she was pregnant, but failed to drown her. Dubricius was born in Madley in Herefordshire, England. He and his mother were reconciled with Peibio when the child Dubricius touched him and cured him of his leprosy.

Noted for his precocious intellect, by the time he attained manhood he was already known as a scholar throughout Britain. Dubricius founded a monastery at Hentland and then one at Moccas. He became the teacher of many well-known Welsh saints, including Teilo and Samson and also healed the sick of various disorders through the laying on of hands. Dedications at Porlock and near Luccombe on the Exmoor coast of Somerset may indicate that he also travelled in that area. He later became Bishop of Ergyng, possibly with his seat at Weston under Penyard, and probably held sway over all of Glamorgan and Gwent, an area that was later known as the diocese of Llandaff. However, he may have merely been a bishop for the purpose of ordaining priests, not as administrative head of the church over a geographical area. Dubricius was good friends with Saints Illtud and Samson, and attended the Synod of Llanddewi Brefi in 545, where he is said to have resigned his see in favour of Saint David. He retired to Bardsey Island where he was eventually buried before his body was transferred to Llandaff Cathedral in 1120.

According to legend, Dubricius was made Archbishop of Llandaff by Saint Germanus of Auxerre, and later crowned King Arthur. He appears as a character in Geoffrey of Monmouth's Historia Regum Britanniae and Wace's Roman de Brut, which was based on it. Much later Alfred, Lord Tennyson featured the saint in his Idylls of the King.

== Liturgical cult ==
Churches dedicated to Saint Dubricius include the Church of England churches at Ballingham, Whitchurch, St Dubricius' Church, Hentland and Hamnish, all in Herefordshire, Porlock in Somerset, and the Church in Wales churches at Gwenddwr in Breconshire and at Llanvaches in Newport. The Catholic Church at Treforest is also dedicated to Dyfrig.

In the 2004 edition of the Roman Martyrology, Dyfrig is listed under 14 November with the Latin name Dubricius. He is stated to have died on Bardsey Island, 'on the north coast of Wales, as a bishop and abbot'. In the current Roman Catholic liturgical calendar for Wales he is commemorated on the traditional date of 14 November.

=== Iconography ===
He is usually represented holding two crosiers to signify his jurisdiction over the sees of Caerleon and Llandaff.
