= Gwrgan Fawr =

Gwrgan Fawr Gurgantius
- King of Ergyng
- Reign: c. 619 - c. 645
- Predecessor: Gwrfoddw
- Successor: Athrwys
- Issue: Caradog, Morgan
- Father: Cynfyn

Gwrgan Fawr (meaning Gwrgan the Great; also, in Latin, Gurgantius; English Fergus; died c. 645) was a king of Ergyng, a south-east Welsh kingdom of the Early Middle Ages.

He was the son of Cynfyn and rightful heir to the Ergyng throne which, however, was initially usurped by Gwrfoddw around AD 615. Gwrgan probably fled Ergyng when his inheritance was seized by Gwrfoddw Hen. He appears in four charters in the Book of Llandaff during the episcopate of Bishops Euddogwy and Inabwy. Later, Gwrgan features as king in charters in the Book of Llandaff associated with Bishops Oudoceus and Iunapeius.

Gwrgan is referred to as King of Damnonia by William of Malmesbury, who reports the terms of a grant of land made by him to the "old church" at Glastonbury in AD 601 in the time of Abbot Worgret.

Little else is known of this monarch, despite his epithet "the Great". However, the overlordship of Glywysing and Gwent may be indicated if he is identified with Gwrgan Frych (the Freckled) who features in the Life of Saint Cadog. This powerful lord who ruled further west in Glywysing, granted the Saint half the fishing rights on the Rivers Usk and Neath in return for the great sword of King Rhun Hir of Gwynedd and a fine new horse with all the trappings. Cadog died a few years before Gwrgan's reign, but the association may have been with the Saint's successors at Llancarfan Abbey.

Gwrgan ruled until around AD 645 when his sons, Caradog and Morgan, should have inherited the throne of Ergyng. When Gwrgan died, the throne of Ergyng was inherited, not by his sons, but by Athrwys, the son of his daughter, Onbrawst. It appears that his son-in-law, King Meurig of Glywysing and Gwent, managed to seize power in the name of his son, Athrwys.
