= Morgan Hen ab Owain =

Morgannwg King

Morgan Hen ab Owain or Morgan Hen (the Old) (died 974), first known as Morgan ab Owain of Gwent and also known as Moragn Hen Fawr, was the king of Morgannwg. He ruled Gwent from c. 930 and Morgannwg from AD 942 to 974.

In 931, Morgan was one of the Welsh rulers who submitted to Athelstan's overlordship, and attended him at court in Hereford, following Hywel Dda's approach of friendship rather than conflict with the Saxon rulers in England.

Morgan was the son of Owain ap Hywel (Glywysing) and grandson of Hywel ap Rhys (Glywysing), who united and ruled the Kingdom of Glywysing in south east Wales at the end of the 9th century. His brothers were Gruffydd ab Owain (died c. 935 at the hands of troops from Ceredigion) and Cadwgan ab Owain (died c. 949 0r 951, "murdered by the Saxons") who ruled as joint kings of Glywysing.

Morgan succeeded his father, Owain c. 930 as king in Gwent, with his brothers also starting their rule at the same time. Following his brothers' deaths, Morgan absorbed their kingdom into his and united the former kingdoms of Gwent and Glywysing in 942 under the name of Morgannwg. Morgan paid homage to the English kings as a form of protection and is recorded as witnessing royal charters for Kings Æthelstan, Eadred and Eadwig.

Morgan lived a long life, which brought him the name Morgan Hen, meaning old, and Morgan Mawr, meaning great, both used as a terms of respect. Morgan is thought to have married Lleucu ferch Enflew. His son Idwallon died in 975 and may have briefly inherited his throne before another son Owain took over. Two other sons were called Cadell and Cynfyn.

The Kingdom of Morgannwg was held by his descendants until his great-great grandson, Meurig was usurped from Morgannwg by Gruffudd ap Llywelyn.

== Sources ==
- Lloyd, John Edward (1894). "Morgan Hen" . In Lee, Sidney (ed.). Dictionary of National Biography. Vol. 39. London: Smith, Elder & Co.
- Thornton, David E. "Morgan Hen (d. 974)". Oxford Dictionary of National Biography (online ed.). Oxford University Press. doi:10.1093/ref:odnb/19210. (Subscription, Wikipedia Library access or UK public library membership required.)
