= Glywysing =

Early medieval petty kingdom in south-east Wales

Coordinates: 53°30′N 3°24′W

Kingdom of Glywysing Teyrnas Glywysing (Old Welsh)
- 5th century–c. 1055 (intermittently in union with Gwent/in Morgannwg)
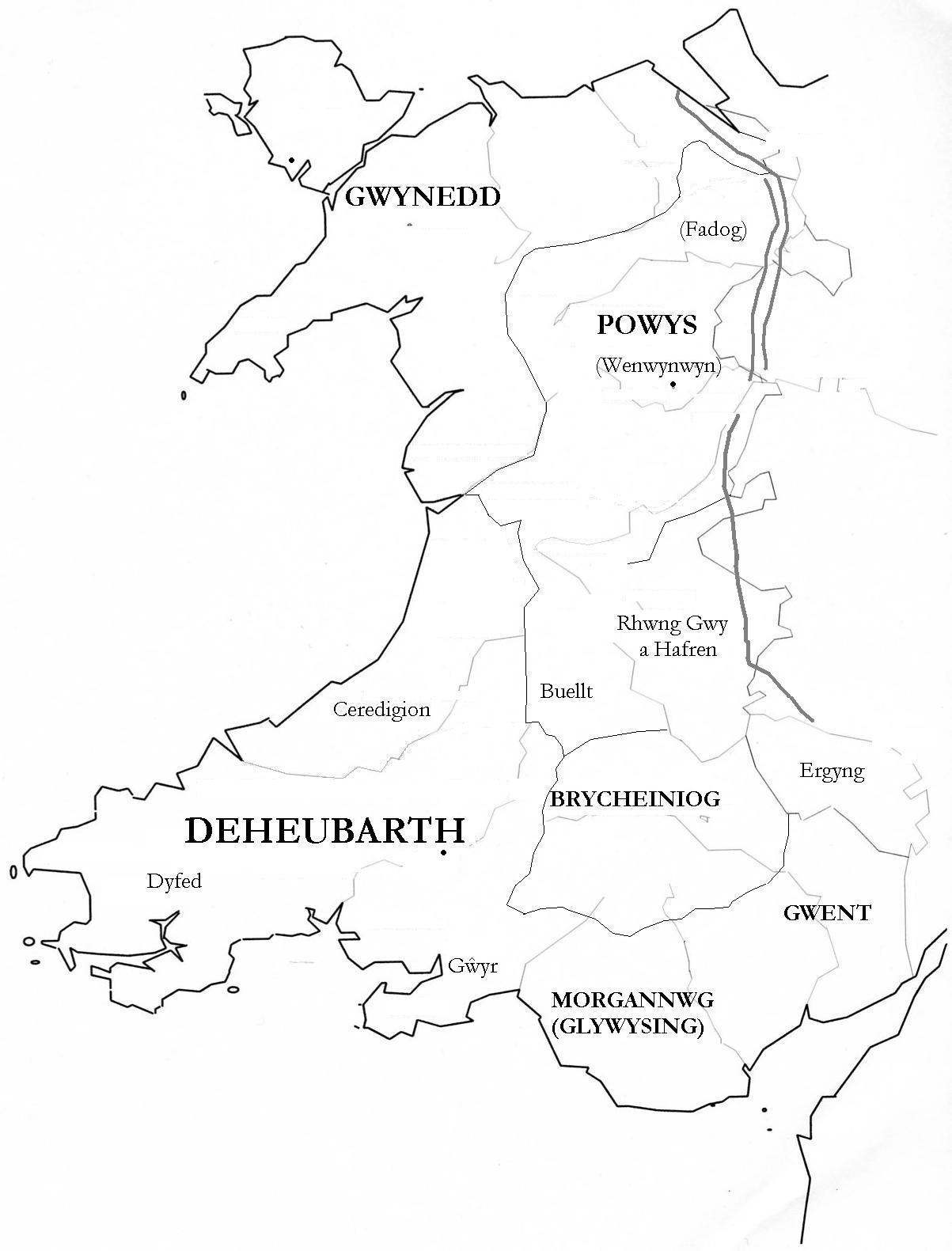
- Medieval kingdoms of Wales, showing Glywysing in the south
- Capital: Cardiff
- Common languages: Old Welsh
- Religion: Celtic Christianity
- Government: Monarchy
- Historical era: Middle Ages
  - Formed after Roman withdrawal from Britain: Late 5th century
  - Various unions with Gwent: 6th century–c. 745
  - Union in Morgannwg (under Morgan Hen ab Owain): 942–974
  - Union as part of Wales (under Gruffydd ap Llywelyn, King of Wales): 1055–1063
  - Union in Morgannwg: 1063–1074
  - Becomes Morgannwg (under Caradog ap Gruffydd): 1075
| Preceded by | Succeeded by |
| Roman Britain; Kingdom of Morgannwg | Kingdom of Morgannwg |

Glywysing was, from the sub-Roman period to the Early Middle Ages, a petty kingdom in south-east Wales. Its people were descended from the Iron Age tribe of the Silures, and frequently in union with Gwent, merging to form Morgannwg.

== Name and early history ==
Glywysing is said in medieval Welsh tradition to be named after Glywys, supposedly an early king of the region. In reality, the name probably comes from Glevum, the Roman name for what is now Gloucester, via a Latin name *Glevenses ('people of Glevum') or *Glevensis ('person from Glevum'). Thus the name suggests that the kingdom was named after invaders or migrants, or a particular ruler, from Glevum.

According to 12th-century sources, after the death of Glywys, the kingdom was divided into three cantrefs named for his sons: Penychen, Gwynllwg, and Gorfynydd. These were typically ruled together by the head of the family and sometimes treated as appenage subkingdoms.

== Location ==
The borders changed over time, but it is generally thought that its lands originally lay between the Afon Llwyd and either the River Loughor, or the River Neath. At times they expanded eastwards in union with both Gwent and Ergyng. The Gower had either returned or was inherited from Dyfed to Glywysing by 928 prior to the reign of King Morgan the Old. Today the area of Glywysing is known as Glamorgan.

== Morgannwg ==
First under King Morgan the Generous (fl. c. 630-730) until the end of the reign of his descendant Ithel (d. c. 745), and later again under King Morgan the Old (r. 942-74), the kingdom merged with Gwent and changed its name to Morgannwg or Gwlad Morgan in honour of the Morgan Kings. During such unions Glywysing and Gwent seem to have been together or occasional sub-kingdoms or principalities of the Kingdom of Morgannwg.

After the death of Morgan the Old, Gwent and Glywysing were separated again from 974 to 1055, but Glywysing alone was often referred to as Morgannwg. Both areas were conquered by Gruffydd ap Llywelyn in about 1055, subsequently King of Wales, but on Gruffydd's death in 1063, Glywysing was regained by the native lineage under Caradog ap Gruffudd. Morgannwg, the union between Gwent and Glywysing, was reconstituted. How this occurred is unclear; possibly the Kings of Glywysing were also Kings of Morgannwg and the Kings of Gwent were semi-independent under-Kings, or vice versa.

=== Norman conquest ===
With Gwent increasingly overrun by the Norman conquest of Wales, the last native King of Morgannwyg and Glywysing was Iestyn ap Gwrgan (1081–1090), who was subsequently deposed by Robert Fitzhamon. Iestyn's sons became Lords of Afan, while Owain ap Caradog ap Gruffudd contented himself with Gwynllwg and founded the line of the Lords of Caerleon.

The name Morgannwg is still used in Wales for the former Marcher Lordship and county of Glamorgan (itself a corruption of the term Gwlad Morgan) and its successor local government areas.

== List of rulers ==
=== Glywysing ===
- Eugenius, son of Magnus Maximus (c.383 - c.440)
- Marius, son of Eugenius (c.440 - c.450s)
- Congar, son of Marius (c. 450s)
- Solar, son of Marius (fl c.470)
- Glywys, son of Solar (c. 470–c. 480), who gave his name to the kingdom
  - Gwynllyw, son of Glywys, ruler of Gwynllwg (c. 480–523), cantref of Glywysing
  - Pawl, son of Glywys, ruler of Penychen (c. 480–540), cantref of Glywysing
  - Mechwyn, son of Glywys, ruler of Gorfynydd (c. 480–c.500), cantref of Glywysing
  - Edelig, son of Glywys, King of Edeligion, (fl c.480 - 500?)
- Cadoc, son of Gwynllyw, ruler of Gwynllwg (523–580) and Penychen (540–580), died without heirs

Glywysing is ruled by the Kings of Gwent until Rhys ap Ithel

- Rhys ap Ithel/Rhys ab Idwal, son of the Kings of Gwent (c. 755–785), with brothers, Rhodri and Meurig
- Arthfael Hen ap Rhys (Arthfael the Old) (785–c. 825) with Brochfael ap Rhys
- Rhys ap Arthfael, (c. 830–c. 840)
- Hywel ap Rhys, (c. 840–886)
- Owain ap Hywel (886–c. 930)
  - Gruffydd ab Owain (c. 930–934) King of Gower
  - Cadwgan ab Owain (c. 930–950) King of West Glywysing
- Morgan Hen ab Owain (Morgan the Old) (930–974) united the former kingdoms of Gwent and Glywysing in 942 under the name of Morgannwg, but they were broken up again immediately after his death, remaining separate until about 1055
- Morgan the Old's son, Owain ap Morgan (974–c. 983)
- brothers of Owain ap Morgan (Idwallon, Hywel and Cadell) (dates unknown)
- his son, Rhys ab Owain (c. 990–c. 1000) who ruled Glywysing jointly with his brothers
- Ithel the Black, son Idwallon (990)
  - Hywel ab Owain (c. 990–c. 1043) and
  - Iestyn ab Owain (c. 990–c. 1015)
- his son, Rhydderch ap Iestyn (c. 1015–1033)
- his son, Gruffydd ap Rhydderch (1033–1055)
- Gwrgant ab Ithel the Black (1033 - 1070)
- Gruffydd ap Llywelyn, invader and prince of Gwynedd (1055–1063)
- Gruffydd ap Rhydderch's son, Caradog ap Gruffydd (1063–1081) who was a subject of the King of Gwent and King of Morgannwg Cadwgan ap Meurig before he deposed him and took the kingdom for himself
- Iestyn ap Gwrgan(t) (1081–1091)

Iestyn was the last ruler of an independent Morgannwg, which was thereafter in the possession of the Normans and became the lordship of Glamorgan
