= Wales in the High Middle Ages =

Aspect of Welsh history (1000–1300)

Wales in the High Middle Ages covers the 11th to 13th centuries in Welsh history. Beginning shortly before the Norman invasion of the 1060s and ending with the Conquest of Wales by Edward I between 1278 and 1283, it was a period of significant political, cultural and social change for the country.

== History ==
=== United Wales ===
Map of the extent of Gruffydd ap Llywelyn's Conquest Gwynedd, Gruffydd ap Llywelyn's kingdom

Gruffydd ap Llywelyn was the only ruler to be able to unite Wales under his rule. In 1055, Gruffydd ap Llywelyn killed his rival Gruffydd ap Rhydderch in battle and recaptured Deheubarth.

Originally king of Gwynedd, by 1057 he was the ruler of Wales and had annexed parts of England around the border. He ruled Wales with no internal battles. His territories were again divided into the traditional kingdoms.

Historian John Davies stated that Gruffydd was, "the only Welsh king ever to rule over the entire territory of Wales... Thus, from about 1057 until his death in 1063, the whole of Wales recognised the kingship of Gruffudd ap Llywelyn. For about seven brief years, Wales was one, under one ruler, a feat with neither precedent nor successor." During this time, between 1053 and 1063, Wales lacked any internal strife and was at peace.

=== Anglo-Norman conflict ===
At the time of the Norman conquest of England in 1066, the dominant ruler in Wales was Bleddyn ap Cynfyn, who was king of Gwynedd and Powys. While the Normans consolidated their power in England, in the judgement of historian Rees Davies, Wales was "utterly peripheral to their ambitions and concerns". Welsh support for Eadric the Wild and Edwin of Mercia in their efforts opposing Norman rule led the Normans to turn their attention to Wales. The initial Norman successes were in the south, where William FitzOsbern, 1st Earl of Hereford overran the Kingdom of Gwent before 1070. By 1074 the forces of the Earl of Shrewsbury were ravaging Deheubarth.

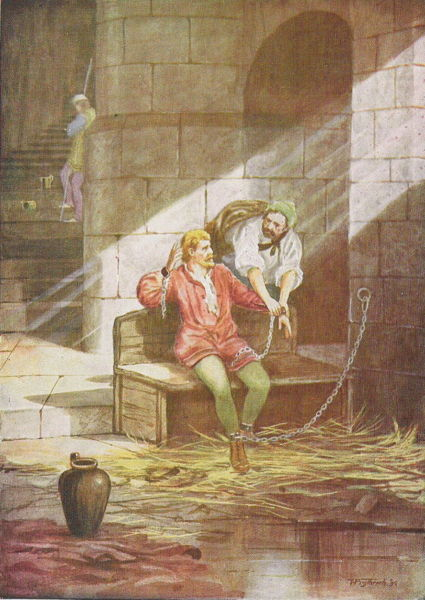
Gruffydd ap Cynan escaping from Hugh d'Avranches, the Earl of Chester"

The killing of Bleddyn ap Cynfyn in 1075 led to civil war and gave the Normans an opportunity to seize lands in northern Wales. In 1081, Gruffudd ap Cynan, who had just won the throne of Gwynedd from Trahaearn ap Caradog at the Battle of Mynydd Carn, was enticed to a meeting with the Earl of Chester and Earl of Shrewsbury and promptly seized and imprisoned, leading to the seizure of much of Gwynedd by the Normans.

Rhys ap Tewdwr of Deheubarth was killed in 1093 in Brycheiniog, and his kingdom was seized and divided between various Norman lordships. The Norman conquest of Wales appeared virtually complete.

In 1094, however, there was a general Welsh revolt against Norman rule, and gradually territories were won back. Gruffudd ap Cynan was eventually able to build a strong kingdom in Gwynedd. His son, Owain Gwynedd, allied with Gruffydd ap Rhys of Deheubarth, won a crushing victory over the Normans at the Battle of Crug Mawr in 1136 and annexed Ceredigion. Owain followed his father on the throne of Gwynedd the following year and ruled until his death in 1170. He was able to profit from the Anarchy in England to extend the borders of Gwynedd further east than ever before as Stephen of Blois and the Empress Matilda were engaged in a struggle for the English throne.

The Kingdom of Powys also had a strong ruler at this time in Madog ap Maredudd, but when his death in 1160 was quickly followed by the death of his heir, Llywelyn ap Madog, Powys was split into two parts and never subsequently reunited.

Norman England held control of much of the Welsh borders and southern agricultural land. This area began, by the 12th century, to be referred to as the Marches (from the French word for a border), whereas the uplands became known as Pura Wallia. The Normans spoke Norman French, but they imported English speaking peasants into lands they controlled, and acted as colonial overlords. Henry I invited Flemish immigrants into Pembrokeshire, fleeing their recently inundated homelands. Here they established a cloth industry. It is not clear what happened to the local populations when these immigrant colonies were created, but medieval writers write of ethnic tensions and conflict, and a century later Llywelyn ap Iorwerth (Llywelyn the Great), Prince of Gwynedd, attacked the area, and slaughtered the Flemish people.

In the south, Gruffydd ap Rhys was killed in 1137, but his four sons, who all ruled Deheubarth in turn, were eventually able to win back most of their grandfather's kingdom from the Normans. The youngest of the four, Rhys ap Gruffydd, ruled from 1155 to 1197. In 1171 Rhys met Henry II of England and came to an agreement with him whereby Rhys had to pay a tribute but was confirmed in all his conquests and was later named Justiciar of South Wales. Rhys held a festival of poetry and song at his court at Cardigan over Christmas 1176, which is generally regarded as the first recorded Eisteddfod. Owain Gwynedd's death led to the splitting of Gwynedd between his sons, while Rhys made Deheubarth dominant in Wales for a time.

=== Llywelyn the Great and Llywelyn the Last ===
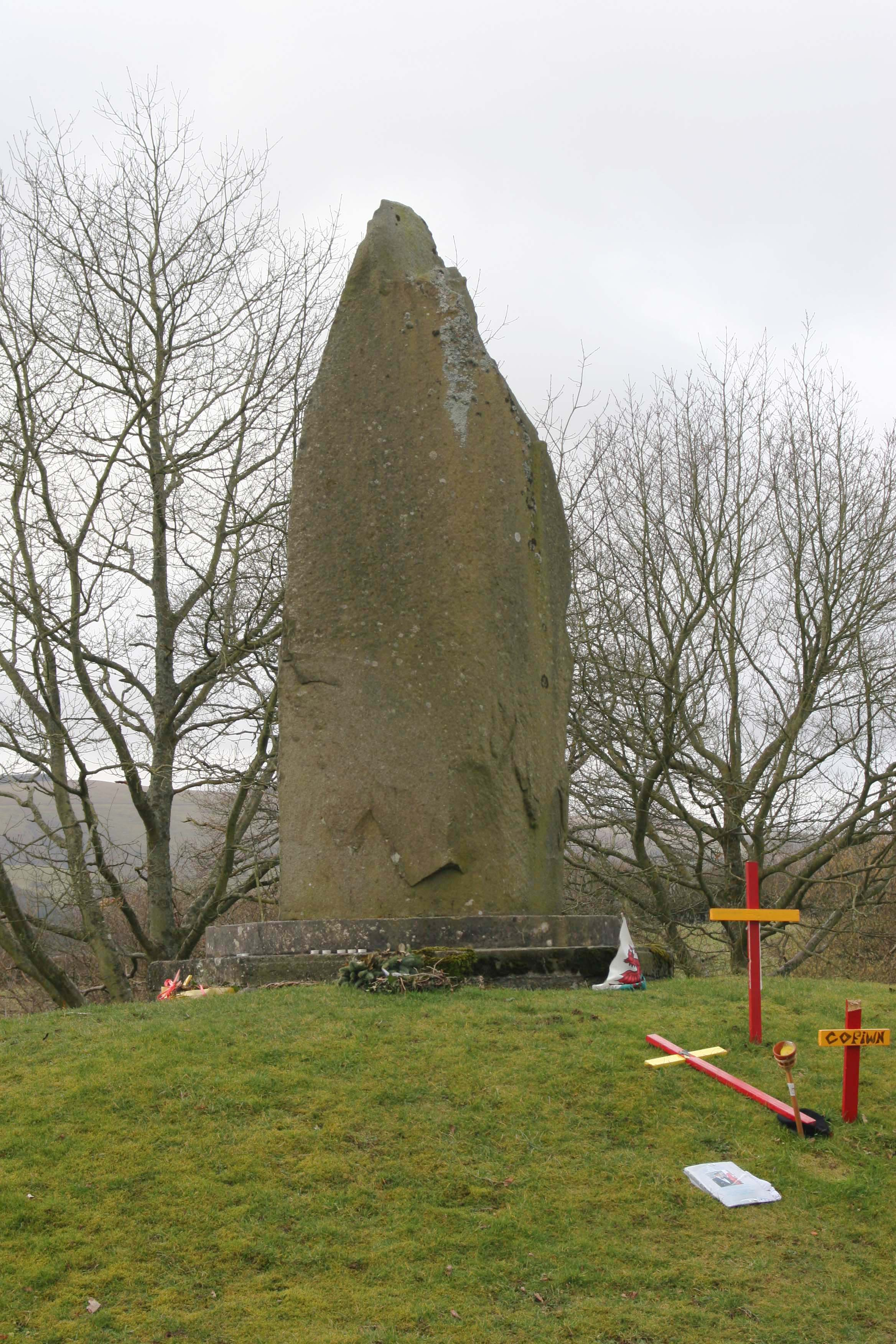
The Llywelyn Monument at Cilmeri

Out of the power struggle in Gwynedd eventually arose one of the greatest of Welsh leaders, Llywelyn ab Iorwerth, also known as Llywelyn Fawr (the Great), who was sole ruler of Gwynedd by 1200 and by his death in 1240 was effectively ruler of much of Wales. Llywelyn made his 'capital' and headquarters at Abergwyngregyn on the north coast, overlooking the Menai Strait. In 1200 Llywelyn ap Iorwerth (or Llywelyn the Great) became King of Gwynedd and agreed to a treaty of peace with King John of England, marrying his illegitimate daughter Joan. 1208 Llywelyn claimed the Kingdom of Powys after the arrest of Gwenwynwyn ap Owain. Powys was left vulnerable following Gwenwynwyn's arrest by King John, who disapproved of his attacks on Marcher Lords of the South.

King John achieved greater dominance over Wales and in 1211, he took the son of Llywelyn the Great as hostage, and also forced the surrender of territory in north-east Wales. Llywelyn's son, Gruffydd ap Llywelyn, and other hostages were used as security by the king. However the Welsh and Scots joined English rebel Barons in forcing John to sign Magna Carta of 1215. The document therefore holds specific Welsh provisions. These included the return of lands and liberties to Welshmen if those lands and liberties had been taken by English (and vice versa) without a law abiding judgement of their peers. (Note: Chapter 56: The return of lands and liberties to Welshmen if those lands and liberties had been taken by English (and vice versa) without a law-abiding judgement of their peers. Chapter 57: The return of Gruffydd ap Llywelyn, the illegitimate son of Llywelyn ap Iorwerth (Llywelyn the Great) along with other Welsh hostages who were originally taken for "peace" and "good".) Also the immediate return of Gruffydd and the other Welsh hostages.

Llywelyn went on to gain dominance over all Wales the following year and in 1218, after the death of John in 1218, Llywelyn and King Henry III agreed to the treaty of Worcester which again confirmed Llywelyn's right to Wales until his death in 1240. His son Dafydd ap Llywelyn followed him as ruler of Gwynedd, but King Henry III of England would not allow him to inherit his father's position elsewhere in Wales. War broke out in 1241. On 29 August 1241, under the terms of the Treaty of Gwerneigron, Dafydd II gave up all his lands outside Gwynedd. The conflict broke out again in 1245, and was still in the balance when Dafydd died suddenly at Abergwyngregyn, without leaving an heir in early 1246. Llywelyn the Great's other son, Gruffudd had been killed trying to escape from the Tower of London in 1244. Gruffudd had left four sons, and a period of internal conflict between three of these ended in the rise to power of Llywelyn ap Gruffudd (also known as Llywelyn Ein Llyw Olaf, 'Llywelyn, Our Last Leader').

The Treaty of Montgomery in 1267 confirmed Llywelyn in control, directly or indirectly, over a large part of Wales. Edward I disapproved of Llywelyn's alliance with Simon de Montfort, who revolted along with other barons against the English king in the second barons' war of 1264–1267 and war followed in 1277. Llywelyn was obliged to seek terms, and the Treaty of Aberconwy greatly restricted his authority. War broke out again when Llywelyn's brother Dafydd ap Gruffudd attacked Hawarden Castle on Palm Sunday 1282. On 11 December 1282, Llywelyn was lured into a meeting in Cilmeri in Builth Wells castle with unknown Marchers, where he was killed and his army subsequently destroyed. His brother Dafydd ap Gruffudd continued an increasingly forlorn resistance. He was captured in June 1283 and was hanged, drawn and quartered at Shrewsbury. This ended Welsh independence and in effect, Wales became England's first colony until it was finally annexed through the Laws in Wales Acts 1535–1542.

== See also ==
- History of Gwynedd during the High Middle Ages
