= Kingdom of Morgannwg =

Medieval kingdom in south Wales

Morgannwg (now Glamorgan) was a kingdom in south-east Wales. It was a name for the Kingdom of Glywysing which came into use at the end of the tenth century and ended with conquest by the Normans around 1091.

== History of Morgannwg ==
In the early ninth century, south-east Wales was a kingdom called Gwent, but for periods in the ninth and tenth centuries it was separated into Glywysing in the west and Gwent (now Monmouthshire) in the east, with Glywysing having a higher status. Glywysing was called Morgannwg (now Glamorgan) from the end of the tenth century.

=== Norman conquest ===
With Gwent increasingly overrun by the Norman conquest of Wales, the last native King of Morgannwyg was Iestyn ap Gwrgan (1081–1090), who was subsequently deposed by Robert Fitzhamon. Iestyn's sons became Lords of Afan, while Owain ap Caradog ap Gruffudd contented himself with Gwynllwg and founded the line of the Lords of Caerleon.

The name Morgannwg is still used in Wales for the former Marcher Lordship and county of Glamorgan (itself a corruption of the term Gwlad Morgan) and its successor counties.
