= Newton Green =

Hamlet in Monmouthshire, Wales

Coordinates: 51.62251°N 2.69622°W

- Hamlet
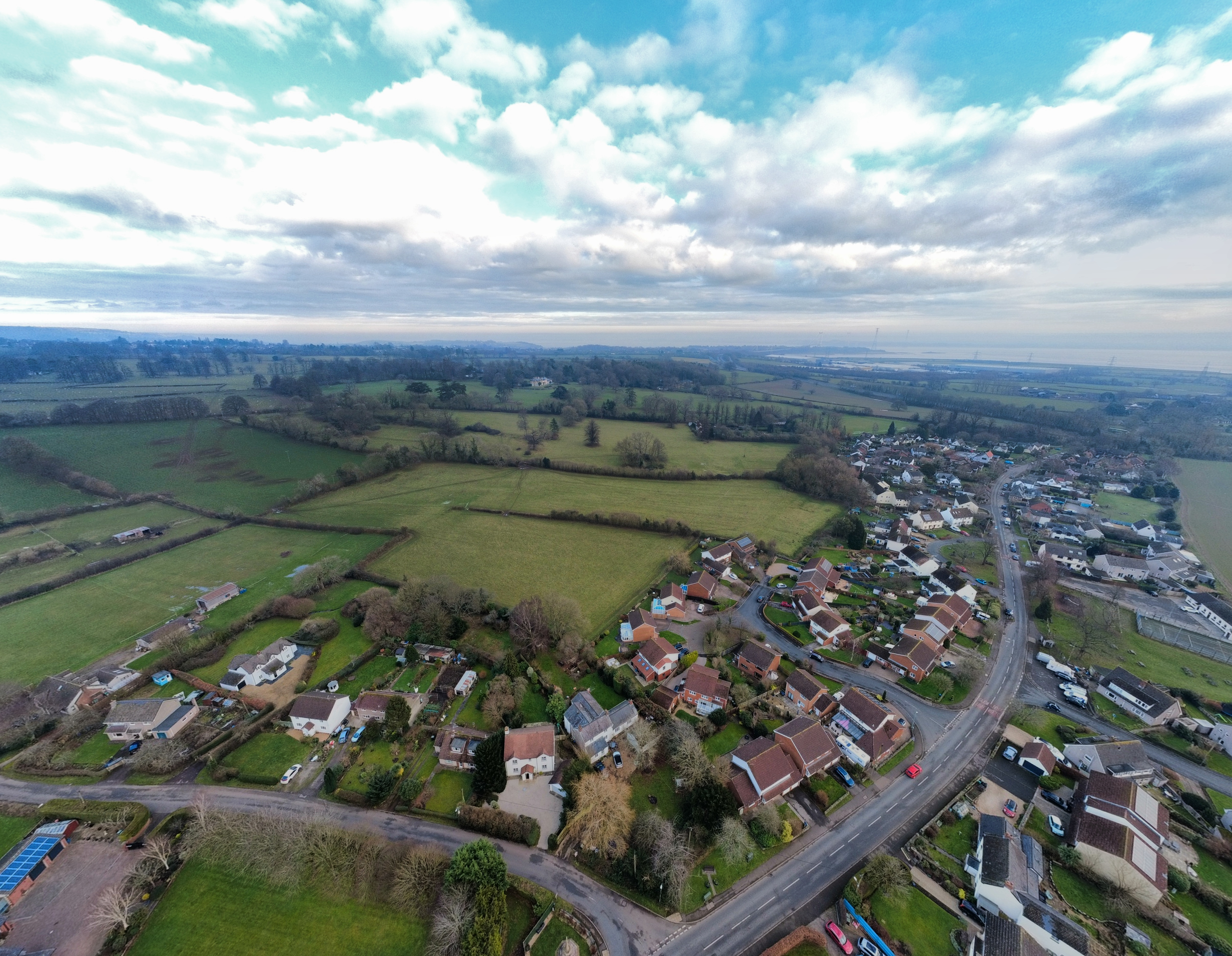
- Wide-angle panorama of Newton Green from 80 metres, looking east. Wyelands House is central in the distance

- Location within Monmouthshire
- Community: Mathern
- Principal area: Monmouthshire
- Country: Wales
- Sovereign state: United Kingdom
- Police: Gwent
- Fire: South Wales
- Ambulance: Welsh
- UK Parliament: Monmouthshire

Newton Green is a hamlet in Monmouthshire north of Mathern. It is part of the parish and modern community area of Mathern.

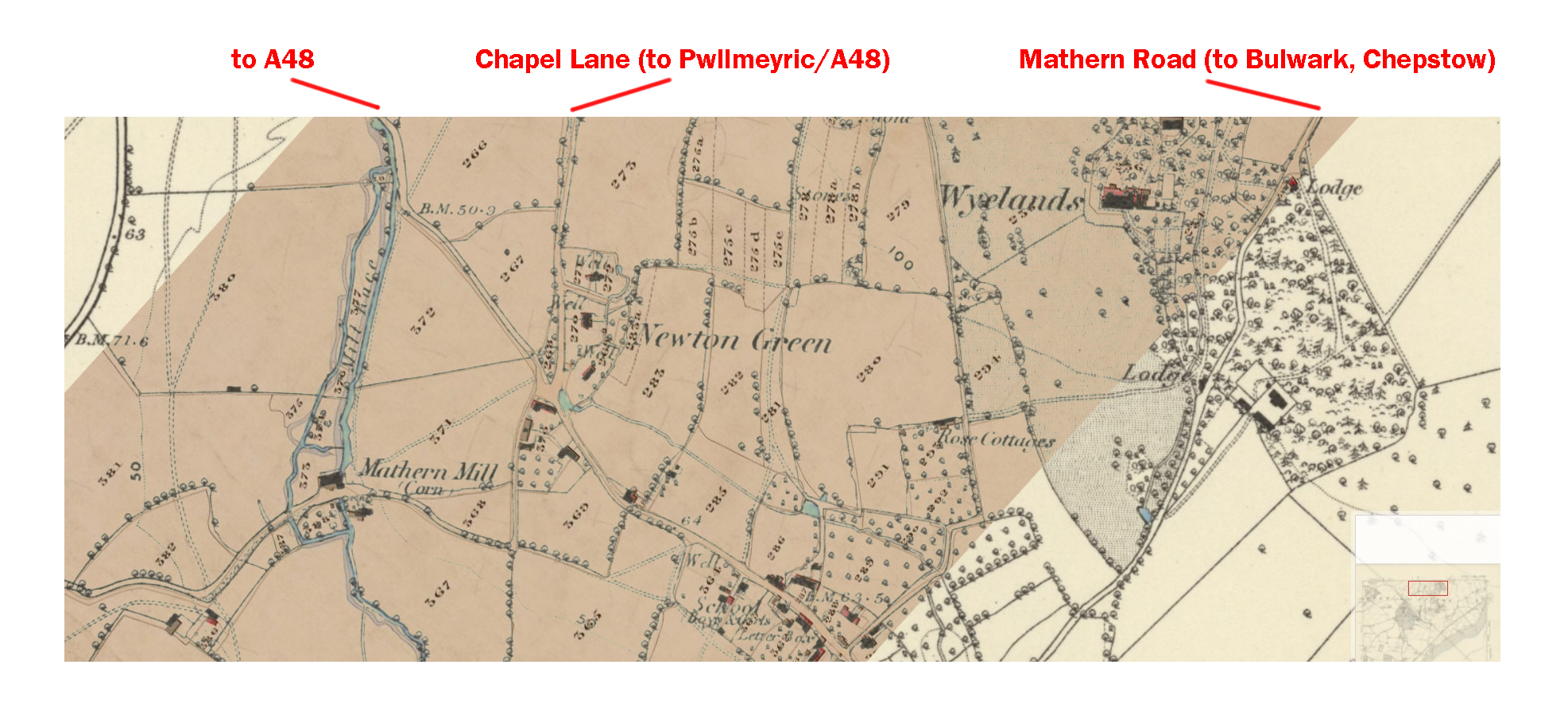
A map of Newton Green made of a strip of the 1845 tithe map (with property numbers) overlaid on the 1887 OS map.

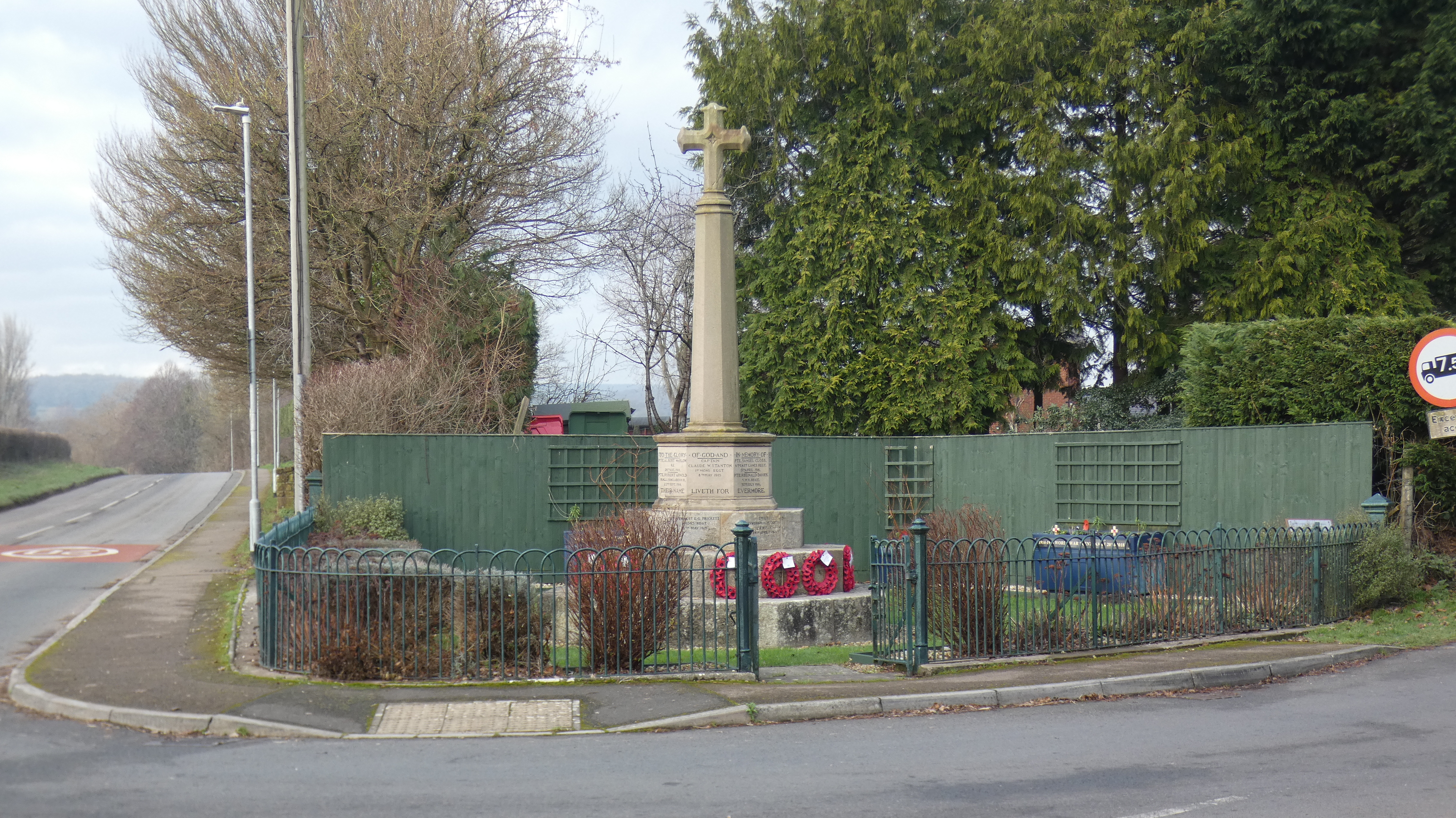
The war memorial in Newton Green at the southern end of Chapel Lane.

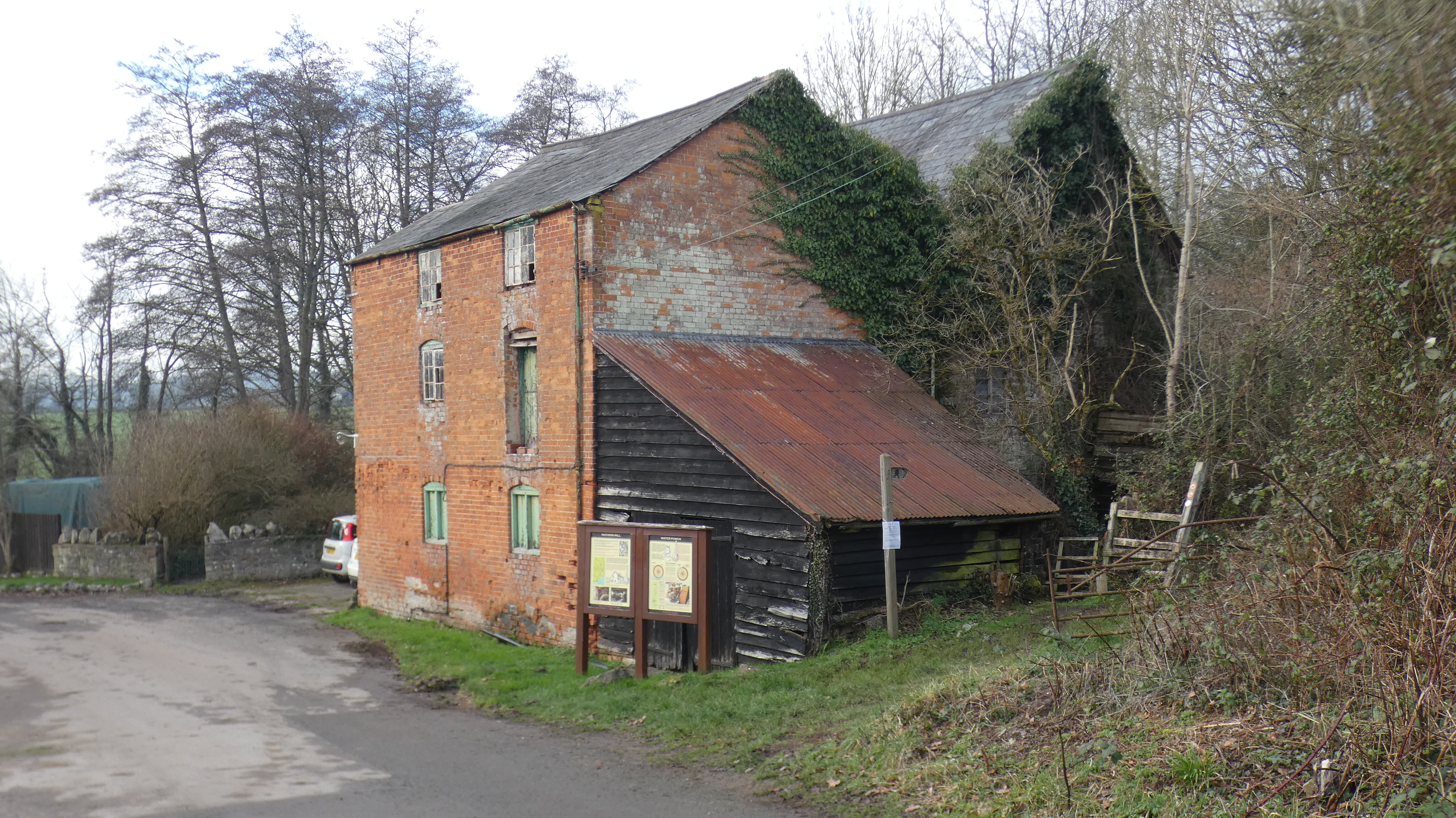
Mathern Mill on Bailey's Hay, west-northwest of Newton Green, last operational in 1968.

== Geography ==
The hamlet lies on conglomerate sedimentary bedrock, specifically Mercia Mudstone Group marginal facies, formed between 252.2 and 201.3 million years ago in the Triassic period. In the area it lies by other types of mudstone from the same Group; all are common to the region down to the River Severn, typically reddish or yellowish and underlie Mathern, Pwllmeyric to the north and much of the Bulwark part of Chepstow to the east. Elevations are between 20 and 23 metres. Mounton Brook, which has its sources in the sandstone hills northwest of Mathern, passes to the east along with the old leat for Mathern Mill.

== History ==
The whole area has long been occupied. There are Bronze-Age remains evident as are signs of the Roman road which was followed roughly by the modern A48 Newport-Chepstow road to the north through what is now Pwllmeyric. Newton Green was originally a large post-mediaeval 'village' green. It appears on survey maps going back 200 years, centred on the area immediately southwest of the junction of Chapel Road and the road (unnamed on most maps) leading through Mathern to the A48. The area around the houses of Newton Green, including much land north until the A48, east to the A466 link road and south past the M4 motorway, was designated part of the old Conservation Area. The construction of the M4 through the area from 1964 (with the section opening in 1967) bisected the parish.

In 1894, the crops of the area were listed as being divided between grass and corn (Mathern Mill was a corn mill), with two principal landowners: Charles Lewis, lord of the manor, deputy lieutenant and justice of the peace resident at St. Pierre and Rev. Robert Vaughan Hughes, resident of the Wyelands estate (which remained in his family through the 20th century) that lies past the old quarry and Rose Cottages on the east of Newton Green.

=== Archaeology and Scheduled Monuments ===
- Bronze Age round barrow in field south of Newton Green and east of the fishing ponds (location: 51.61855,-2.69443)
- Ffynnaun Elichguid, a well and boundary feature, earliest recording in the year 655 (location: 51.62465, -2.69454).
- Mathern Mill and House (location: 51.62147, -2.70137). A mill existed on mapping from the 14th century. It is referred to in a court roll from 1571 and included in the return of Thomas Lewis of St. Pierre in 1585. The current mill is believed to have internal structure from the 18th century with the exterior not changed past the 19th century. The machinery was last used in 1968. Behind the mill from the road is the remains of an associated post-mediaeval structure.
- Hollow way from Mathern Mill to Mathern Palace, likely of mediaeval times (location: 51.6213,-2.7012).
- Hollow way (from the village, location: 51.61884, -2.69637).
- Leats east and west of Mathern Mill Farm (location:51.61927, -2.69787).
- Post-mediaeval bridge stonework (location: 51.61782, -2.69775).
- Wyelands House (also the gardens and other features separately)(location: 51.62412, -2.68959).
- Rose Cottage gardens (location: 51.62165, -2.69231).
- Swynswell, a 'Jones class D' well (location: 51.6203, -2.6944).
- The Old School and the telephone call box at the Old school (location: 51.62028, -2.69468).
- Model cottages (1891 almshouses, location: 51.62024, -2.69400).
- Newton Green war memorial (location: 51.62233, -2.69818).

== Human Geography and Local Government ==
As of 2022, Newton Green is in the community and community ward of Mathern, and the electoral ward of Shirenewton. It is in the catchment area of The Dell Primary School and Chepstow School. For the electoral ward, the 2021 Census recorded 2119 residents, a density of 59.4 people per square kilometre. Deprivation is low; more than half the population is in managerial, professional or administrative employment. Of the economically active, 97% are in employment.

The member of parliament for the area is Catherine Fookes of the Labour Party, representing the Monmouthshire constituency as of 2024.
