= St Pierre Hotel Gatehouse =

Gatehouse and range at the St Pierre Hotel
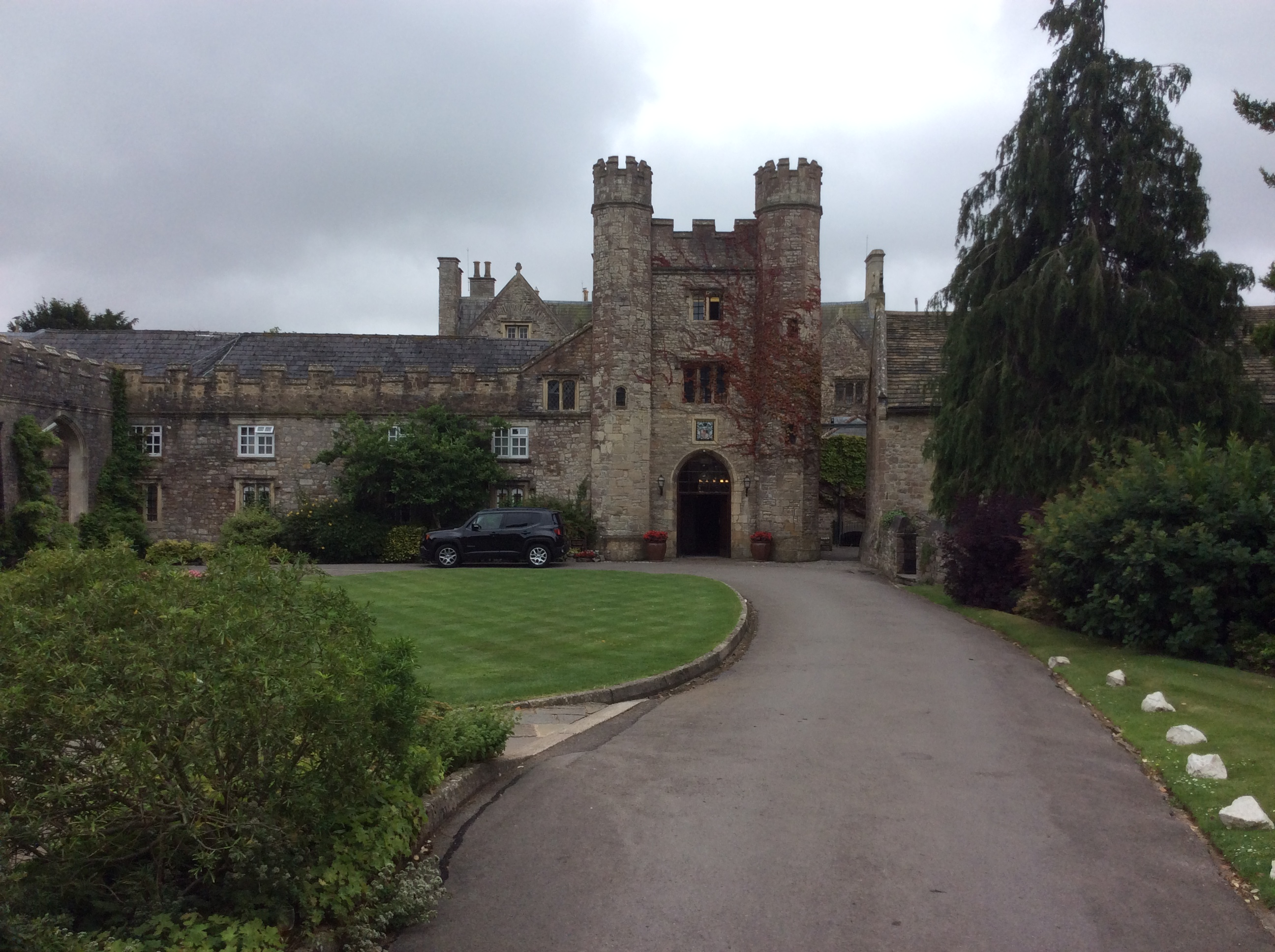
- "Its historic character has been almost overwhelmed"

- Location within Monmouthshire
- 51.6119°N 2.7017°W
- Type: Gatehouse
- Location: St Pierre, Mathern, Monmouthshire

History
- Built: 1692

Site notes
- Architectural style: Medieval
- Governing body: Privately owned

Listed Building – Grade II*
- Official name: Gatehouse and attached range at St Pierre Hotel
- Designated: 6 October 1953
- Reference no.: 2010

Cadw/ICOMOS Register of Parks and Gardens of Special Historic Interest in Wales
- Official name: St Pierre
- Designated: 1 February 2022
- Reference no.: PGW(Gt)29(Mon)
- Listing: Grade II

The Gatehouse and attached range, at the St Pierre Hotel, St Pierre, Mathern, Monmouthshire are the most significant remains of the mansion built by the Lewis family in the late 15th century and owned by them until 1924. The original house was built by William Lewis, and extended by his son George, between 1475 and 1508. After the Lewises sold up, the house had a variety of owners and was converted to the clubhouse of a golf club in 1962. It has since been massively extended as a hotel and country club. The gatehouse and range have Grade II* listed building status. The surrounding gardens are included on the Cadw/ICOMOS Register of Parks and Gardens of Special Historic Interest in Wales.

== History ==
The origin of the family after whom the hamlet of St Pierre is named are unclear, but it is now thought to be of Welsh derivation, rather than Norman. William Lewis, the founder of the mansion at St Pierre, descended from Sir David ap Philip (c. 1387–1423) and was the first to adopt Lewis as his surname. Sir David was a significant supporter, and financial backer, of Henry IV and Henry V in their French wars and the Monmouthshire author and artist Fred Hando records the legend that Henry V's crown jewels were kept at St Pierre as surety for loans made by Sir David. The mansion was extended by William's son George, who died in 1508. The estate continued in the ownership of the Lewis family until 1924, although they had moved out of the mansion to the neighboring Moynes Court in the late 19th century. The last member of the family to own the estate was Air Commodore Freke William Wiseman-Clark, who died without issue in 1908. After his death, his executors sold the mansion and estate to Daniel Lysaght, the Newport steel magnate.

After Lysaght's death in 1940, and the requisitioning of the house during the Second World War to house refugee children from Bristol, the mansion became the headquarters of the National Association of Boys Clubs. Hando records a visit in 1958 when the estate covered 150 acres. In 1962 the mansion was sold to a Tintern hotelier, who converted it into a clubhouse and laid out a golf course in the grounds. It is now a hotel and country club. In July 2025, the hotel, and the adjacent church of St Peter, were the venues for a meeting of the Welsh bishops’ electoral college, convened to select a new Archbishop of Wales.

== Architecture and description ==
The mansion stands in very close proximity to the church of St Peter. Built of sandstone rubble with Bath Stone dressings, most of the building dates from the mid 19th century or later. The architectural historian John Newman describes the gatehouse as "the most impressive feature" of the mansion and it, and the attached range, are almost the only remaining medieval work. The gatehouse is of three storeys, is constructed of local limestone and has "handsomely battlemented turrets". The upper storeys of the attached range were reconstructed in the 19th century. Newman notes that the house has undergone such significant alteration through its conversion to a hotel that "its historic character has been almost overwhelmed". The gatehouse and range are listed Grade II*. The gardens are listed at Grade II on the Cadw/ICOMOS Register of Parks and Gardens of Special Historic Interest in Wales.
