= St Pierre, Monmouthshire =

Coordinates: 51.611643°N 2.702403°W

St Pierre
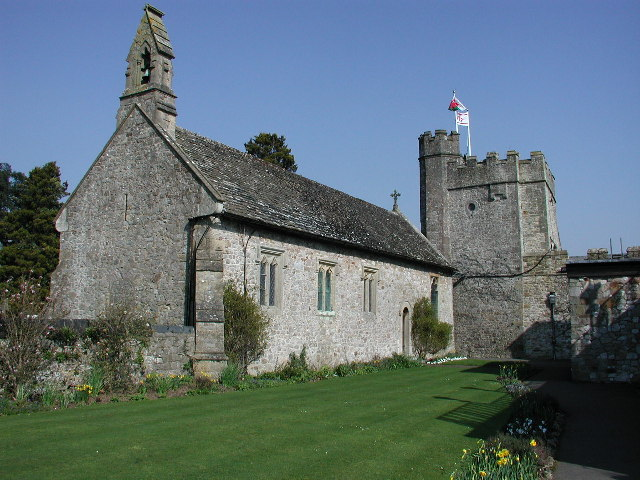
- The Church of St Peter

- Location within Monmouthshire
- OS grid reference: ST515905
- Principal area: Monmouthshire
- Preserved county: Gwent
- Country: Wales
- Sovereign state: United Kingdom
- Post town: CHEPSTOW
- Postcode district: NP16
- Dialling code: 01291
- Police: Gwent
- Fire: South Wales
- Ambulance: Welsh
- UK Parliament: Monmouth

St Pierre is a former parish and hamlet in Monmouthshire, south east Wales, 3 miles (4.8 km) south west of Chepstow and adjacent to the Severn Estuary. It is now the site of a large golf and country club, the Marriott St Pierre Hotel & Country Club, which was previously a large manor house and deer park belonging to the Lewis family.

== History ==
The manor of St Pierre was originally part of the parish of Runston, now a deserted village whose only standing remains are Runston Chapel, and was later amalgamated for civil purposes with the neighbouring parish of Mathern. It is uncertain whether the name originates from a Welsh family, Pŷr, or is of Norman origin.

Around 1380, St Pierre was owned by Sir David ap Philip, who served under King Henry V in France, and the name of his son, Lewis, was later adopted by his family and descendants as their surname. The estate continued in the ownership of the Lewis family until 1924, although they had moved out of the mansion to the neighbouring Moynes Court in the late 19th century. The last member of the family to own the estate was Air Commodore Freke William Wiseman-Clark, who died without issue in 1908. Thomas Lewis, Esq., married the daughter of Sir Richard Levett, Lord Mayor of London, and other Lewis family members also made propitious marriages. Several members of the family became High Sheriffs of Monmouthshire. Others became Members of Parliament, including Thomas Lewis who was MP for Monmouth, Newport and Usk between 1713 and 1752. His family took over and developed the "New Passage" ferry service across the Severn from Black Rock, in competition with the "Old Passage" service run from Beachley by the Duke of Beaufort. In 1925, the mansion and deer park were sold to Daniel Lysaght.

The former manor house includes an important 16th-century gatehouse which is a Grade II* listed building, but the remainder of the building was largely built in the 19th century. Major extensions have been added since the house became a hotel in the 1960s. A hotelier from nearby Tintern, whose ruined Abbey was immortalized by the poetic genius of William Wordsworth, realized the potential for creating what was to become Britain’s first American-style golf and country club, complete with swimming pool, restaurants, bars and bedrooms in what were once the stables.

Bill Graham was driving home from golf at nearby Newport Golf Club when a bank manager friend suggested he buy St. Pierre, which was uninhabited for the first time since the 1400s, and build a golf course and country club. That was on a Friday evening. Go-ahead Graham inspected the premises the following Monday and bought them on Thursday of that same week. That was in 1960 and the first annual golf subscription was the equivalent of $10—a far cry from the Crown Jewels. A golf course (now "the Old Course") was opened in 1962 with a second course in 1975.

== Church of St Peter ==
The church of St Peter is a Grade II listed building. It is Norman in origin, with the earliest records dating to 1254. The nave is Norman, but little remains of the Norman fabric. The chancel was added in the 14th century. New windows and fittings were installed in the 16th century. The church was restored in the Victorian manner by A. W. Maberly of Gloucester in 1873 to 1875, when altar front, screen and font were reinstalled, these having been removed during the Commonwealth period. The church was further restored by Eric Francis in the early 20th century.

It has been suggested that the church may be of Saxon origin. It has a Norman doorway and windows, but was largely rebuilt in later centuries. In the chancel are two ancient stone coffin lids, each bearing an inscription in Norman French, one to Urien de St Pierre, lord of the manor, who died in 1239 and the other to a contemporary cleric of the church, Rector Benet. There are also numerous wall-mounted monuments to members of the Lewis family.

The church is adjacent to the main house, now the country club, and is in the parish of Mathern. There are weekly Sunday morning services.

== Golf club ==
St Pierre Golf & Country Club was the venue for the Curtis Cup in 1980, the Solheim Cup in 1996, and the PGA Welsh Masters in 2000. The club has also hosted many European Tour events including the Epson Grand Prix of Europe from 1986 to 1991 (match play until 1989 and then stroke play), and the British Masters on eight occasions between 1971 and 1983. The Old Course boasts a championship length of over 6,000 yards, par 72. It hosted the 2010 Fightmaster Cup.

== St Pierre Pill ==
St Pierre Pill, 1 mile (1.6 km) south of the golf club on the Wales Coast Path, is an anchorage for small boats on the Severn Estuary. It is the base of the Chepstow and District Yacht Club. There is a small lighthouse known as Redcliffe Lights, on Red Cliff overlooking the harbour, which is operated by the Gloucester Harbour Trustees.

The harbour originally covered a much larger area, later silted up, and is believed to be the site of an important post-Roman harbour, associated with legends of St Tewdric. A ninth-century source which refers to the harbour as Porth-is-Coed – a name later used for the nearby village of Portskewett – also provides the first description of the tidal cycle in Britain. According to Fred Hando, as recently as 1860, the harbour was navigable by 70-ton barges as far upstream as the present golf club. Hando reports also that the Welsh Triads described it as "one of the three great ports of Britain."

== Gallery ==
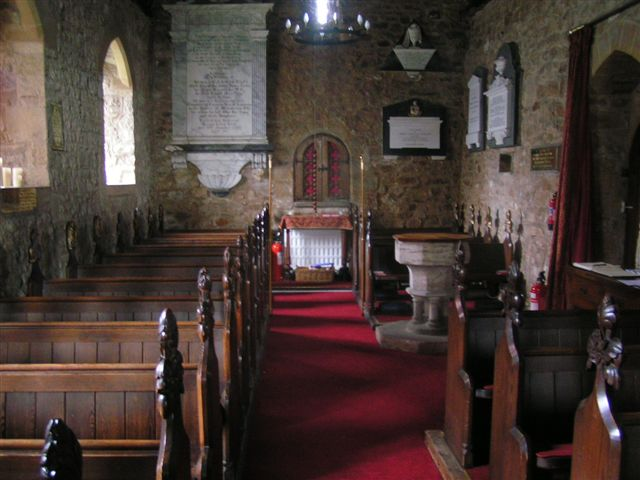
St Peter's church, interior

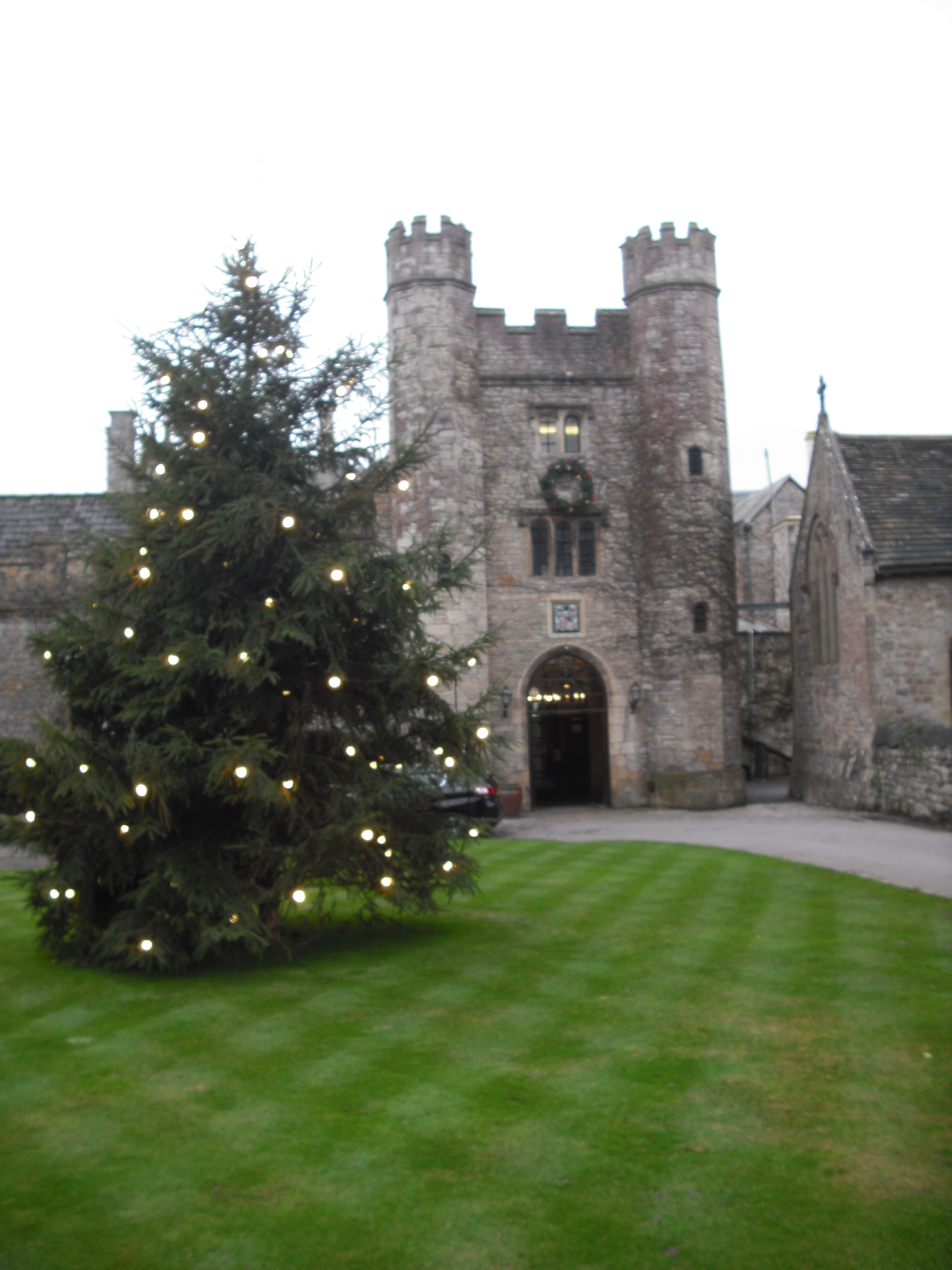
Entrance courtyard

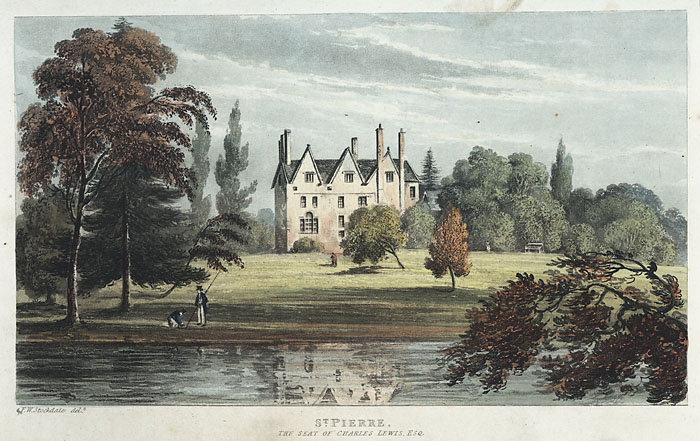
The Manor of St. Pierre, 1825

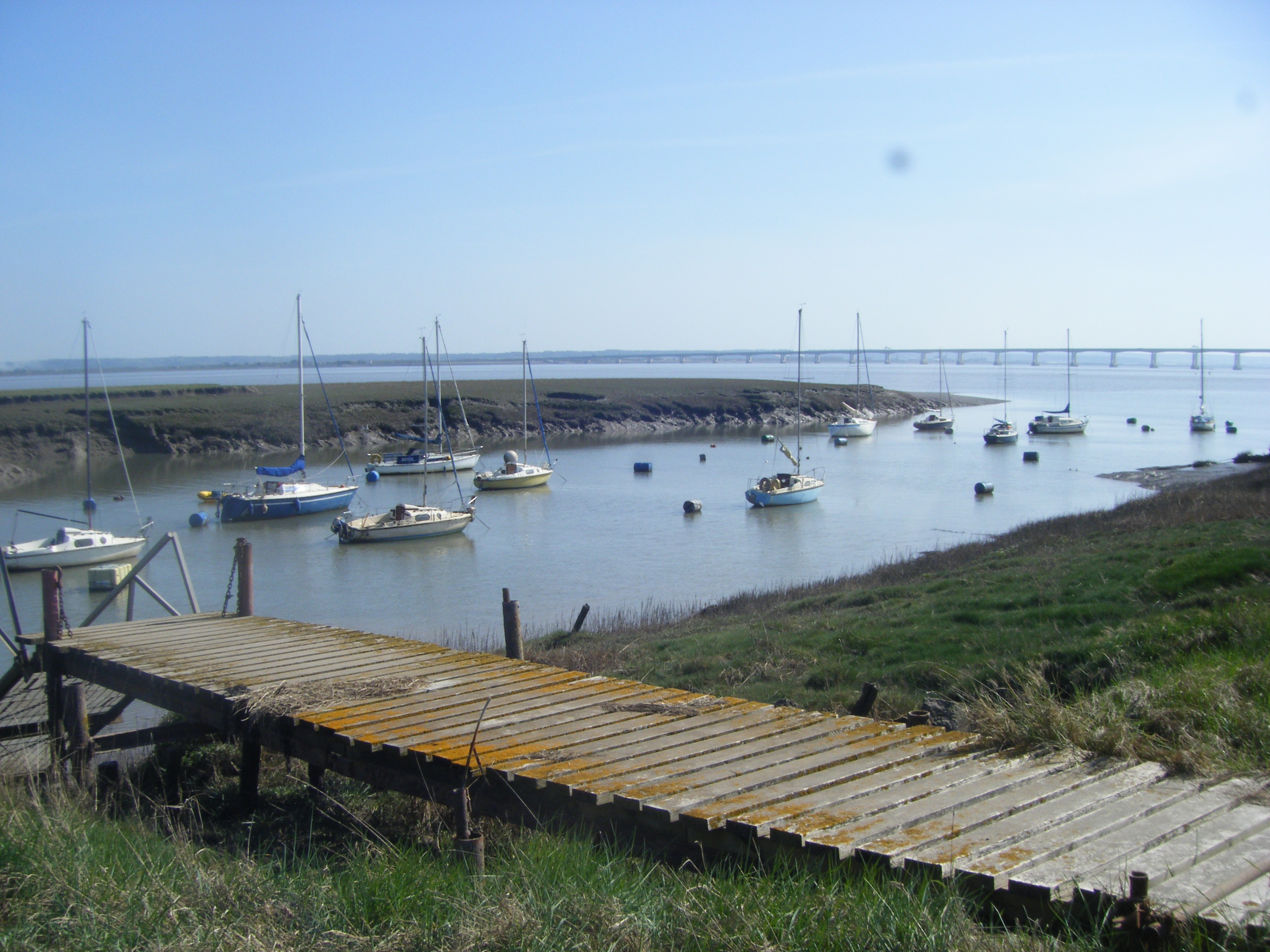
The harbour at St Pierre Pill, looking towards the Second Severn Crossing
