= Wyelands =

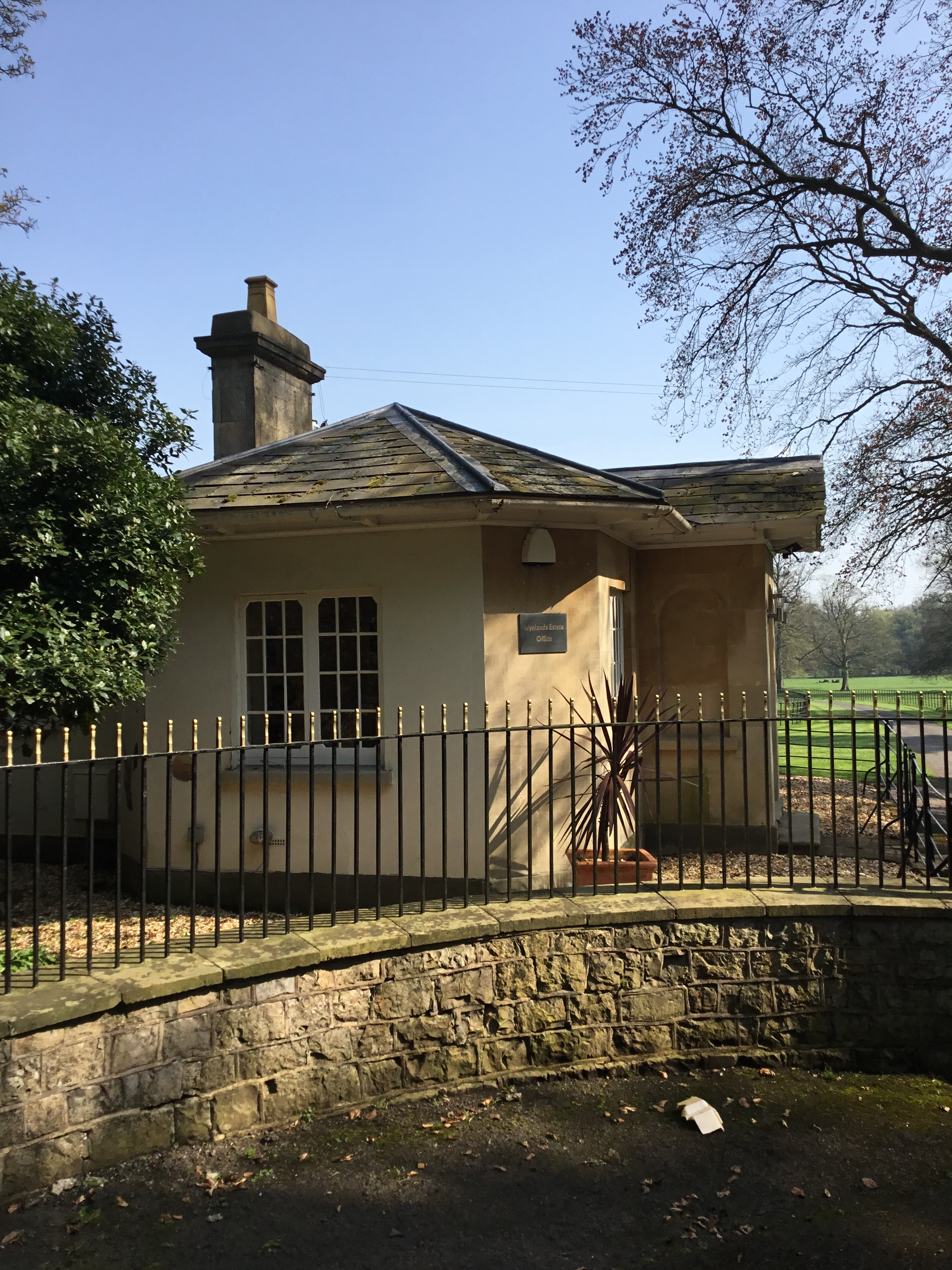
- Wyelands Lodge - the house is not visible from the road

- Location within Monmouthshire
- 51.6241°N 2.6896°W
- Type: House
- Location: Mathern, Monmouthshire

History
- Built: c.1819 to c.1846

Site notes
- Architect: Robert Lugar
- Architectural style: Neoclassical
- Governing body: Privately owned

Listed Building – Grade II*
- Official name: Wyelands
- Designated: 10 October 2000
- Reference no.: 24100

Listed Building – Grade II
- Official name: Wyelands Lodge
- Designated: 10 October 2000
- Reference no.: 24082

Cadw/ICOMOS Register of Parks and Gardens of Special Historic Interest in Wales
- Official name: Wyelands
- Designated: 1 February 2022
- Reference no.: PGW(Gt)51(Mon)
- Listing: Grade II

Wyelands, sometimes styled The Wyelands or Wyelands House, is a Grade II* listed building and estate located about 1 mile (1.6 km) north of the village of Mathern, Monmouthshire, Wales, United Kingdom and about 1 mile (1.6 km) west of the edge of Chepstow. It is a neoclassical villa designed by Robert Lugar in the late Regency period, and was completed around 1830. The park surrounding the house is listed on the Cadw/ICOMOS Register of Parks and Gardens of Special Historic Interest in Wales.

== History ==
The house was commissioned by George Buckle, a leading Chepstow shipbuilder and timber merchant who was High Sheriff of Monmouthshire in 1819. There is some uncertainty as to the date of the house's construction. It was started, but is unlikely to have been finished, before Buckle's death in 1824. The Royal Commission on the Ancient and Historical Monuments of Wales date it as "closer to 1819 than 1846", and it was probably built by 1834, when George Buckle's son John (c.1796-1845), also a shipbuilder and merchant, was appointed Sheriff of Monmouthshire.

The property was sold first to John Russell (1788-1873), a colliery owner and magistrate, who in turn became Sheriff of Monmouthshire in 1855. Following Russell's purchase of the neighbouring estate of Piercefield, Wyelands passed to Major General Sir Edmund Keynton Williams, whose son sold Wyelands to Rev. Robert Vaughan Hughes; he lived there with his family until his death in 1901. His son, Gerald Vaughan Hughes, who was Sheriff of Monmouthshire in 1919, then occupied the house; in turn, his son, Brigadier Gerald Birdwood Vaughan-Hughes (1896-1983), became Sheriff in 1960.

Wyelands was put on the market in 2009 with a price of £4.5 million. The house was refurbished during the ownership of John Ward, who offered the property for rent. Most recently, the estate was bought by the industrialist Sanjeev Gupta.

== Architecture ==
The villa is described by the RCAHMW as "a compact classical Regency villa" of two storeys, built of Bath stone ashlar. The main entrance, on the north side, has a shallow porch and doorway flanked by pairs of Ionic columns. The east wing is slightly lower, originally contained the service and children's rooms, and is rendered. A stone conservatory was added to the wing in the 19th century. The house has several false windows, as the internal arrangement of walls and fireplaces is unrelated to the design of the exterior. A covered swimming pool, to the east of the service wing, was added in 1999. The architectural historian John Newman describes the ensemble of the buildings as "remarkably complete and beautifully preserved."

The garden, to which formal balustrades and a stone summer house were added in the 19th century, is to the south of the house. There are also stables. The North Lodge is contemporary with the main building. The whole estate covers some 286 acres (116 ha).

The Vaughan-Hughes family sponsored the building of estate cottages, including an almshouse, for their workers and former workers, in the Newton Green area of Mathern village. The almshouses are dated 1891.

Wyelands was given Grade II* listed building status on 10 October 2000. The park is listed Grade II on the Cadw/ICOMOS Register of Parks and Gardens of Special Historic Interest in Wales.

=== Listing designations ===
In addition to the listings for the house and the gardens, a number of other buildings on the wider estate are listed in their own right, all at Grade II. These include: three lodges; two sets of gates and railings; some garden ornamentation; and the stables, and a number of agricultural buildings at the estate's home farm.
