= St Tewdric's Church =

Church in Monmouthshire, Wales

Coordinates: 51.6147°N 2.6901°W

- Church of St Tewdric
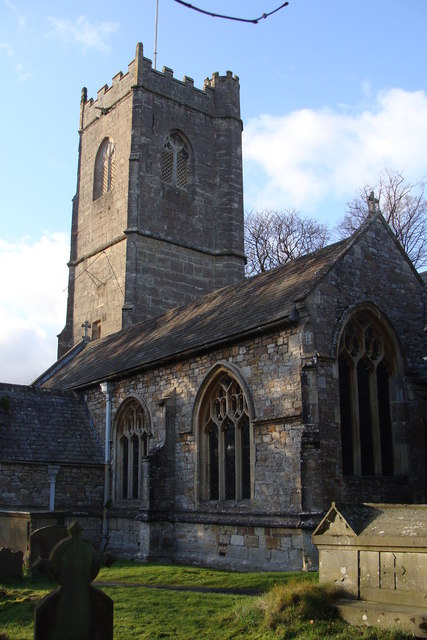
- St Tewdric's Church
- Denomination: Church in Wales
- Previous denomination: Roman Catholic; Church of England

History
- Status: active
- Founder: Meurig ap Tewdrig
- Dedication: St Tewdric

Architecture
- Heritage designation: Grade I
- Designated: 1955
- Years built: 6th century 13th century 15th century 19th century

Administration
- Diocese: Diocese of Monmouth
- Parish: Mathern

St Tewdric's Church is a Church in Wales parish church in Mathern, Monmouthshire, Wales. It is purportedly built over the resting place of Saint Tewdrig for whom it is named. A church has been located on the site since the 6th century. It was reconstructed by the Normans in the Early English style, and later was renovated by the Victorians. It is a Grade I listed building.

== Foundation ==
According to the Liber Landavensis, when King Tewdrig fell in battle against the Anglo-Saxons at the River Wye, it was his desire to be buried on Ynys Echni; however the soldiers were unable to get his body there. Instead, he was buried at Mathern by his son Meurig ap Tewdrig. An oratory was built on top of his grave, and the land surrounding it was given to the Celtic Christian Bishops of Llandaff. Nearby Mathern Palace was later built for the use of the bishops.

== Mediaeval history ==
Following the Norman conquest of Wales, the Celtic foundation was rebuilt in the twelfth and thirteenth centuries, in the Early English style. The chancel and nave arcades of the existing church date from those periods, so that "the interior is dominated by work of the C13," though the west pier of the north arcade dates from the previous century. In the words of architectural historian John Newman, it was later "grandiosely enlarged" by John Marshall, the Bishop of Llandaff between 1478 and 1496. Under his stewardship, the aisles were widened, a porch added on the south side, and the tower, built of ashlar blocks, was constructed.

== Discovery of the coffin, and Victorian restoration ==
A stone coffin, thought to contain the remains of Tewdrig, was first discovered when Francis Godwin was bishop in 1614; at that time it was moved to the chancel. An urn containing the heart of another bishop, Miles Salley, was unearthed and reburied at the same time.

In the 1880s, the Church of England ordered a renovation of the church. John Prichard restored part of the church for £2,500. Ewan Christian later restored the chancel while rebuilding the south wall of the church and reroofing. During the renovation, the stone coffin was rediscovered under the altar, with a skeleton with the skull split by an axe blow, in the same way that Tewdrig supposedly died. However historian Fred Hando claims from an eye-witness account that the skull only had a hole from a spear in it rather than an axe split. The remains were reinterred afterwards. On the wall of the chancel is a late 18th-century inscription noting that Tewdrig (Theodoric) is interred in the church, with an addendum noting the rediscovery of the coffin in 1881.

== Fixtures ==
Following restorations, the church now has no visible elements of the original Celtic church. The oldest parts of the church are the arcades of the nave and the arch over the chancel. In 1943, the original medieval font was rediscovered buried underneath the porch and reinstalled for use in the church. The church was granted Grade I listed status in 1955 for being "...a very fine medieval church with interesting Victorian alterations, and for its historic connection with the Bishops of Llandaff and their nearby Mathern Palace."

== Gallery ==
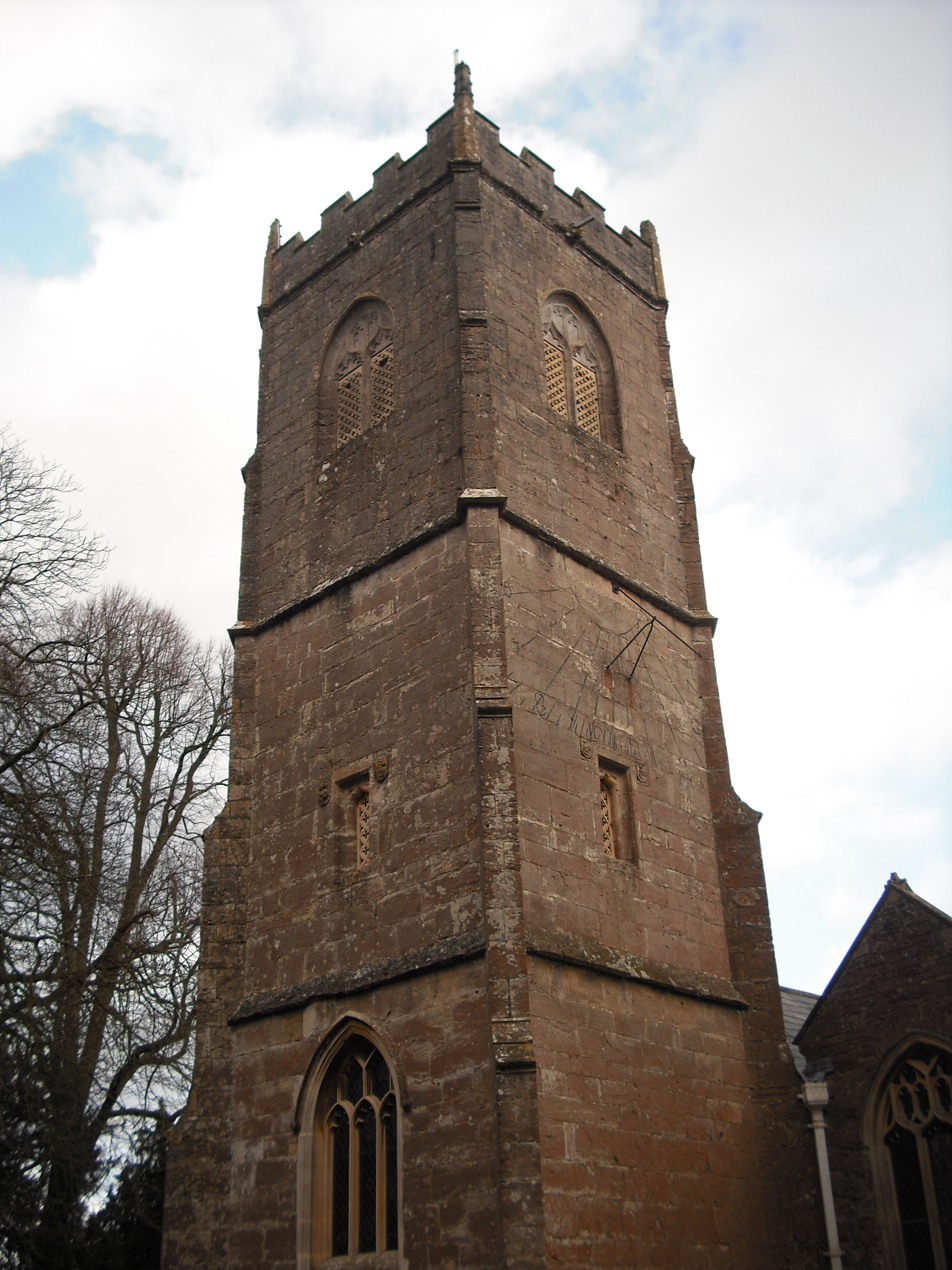
Tower from south west

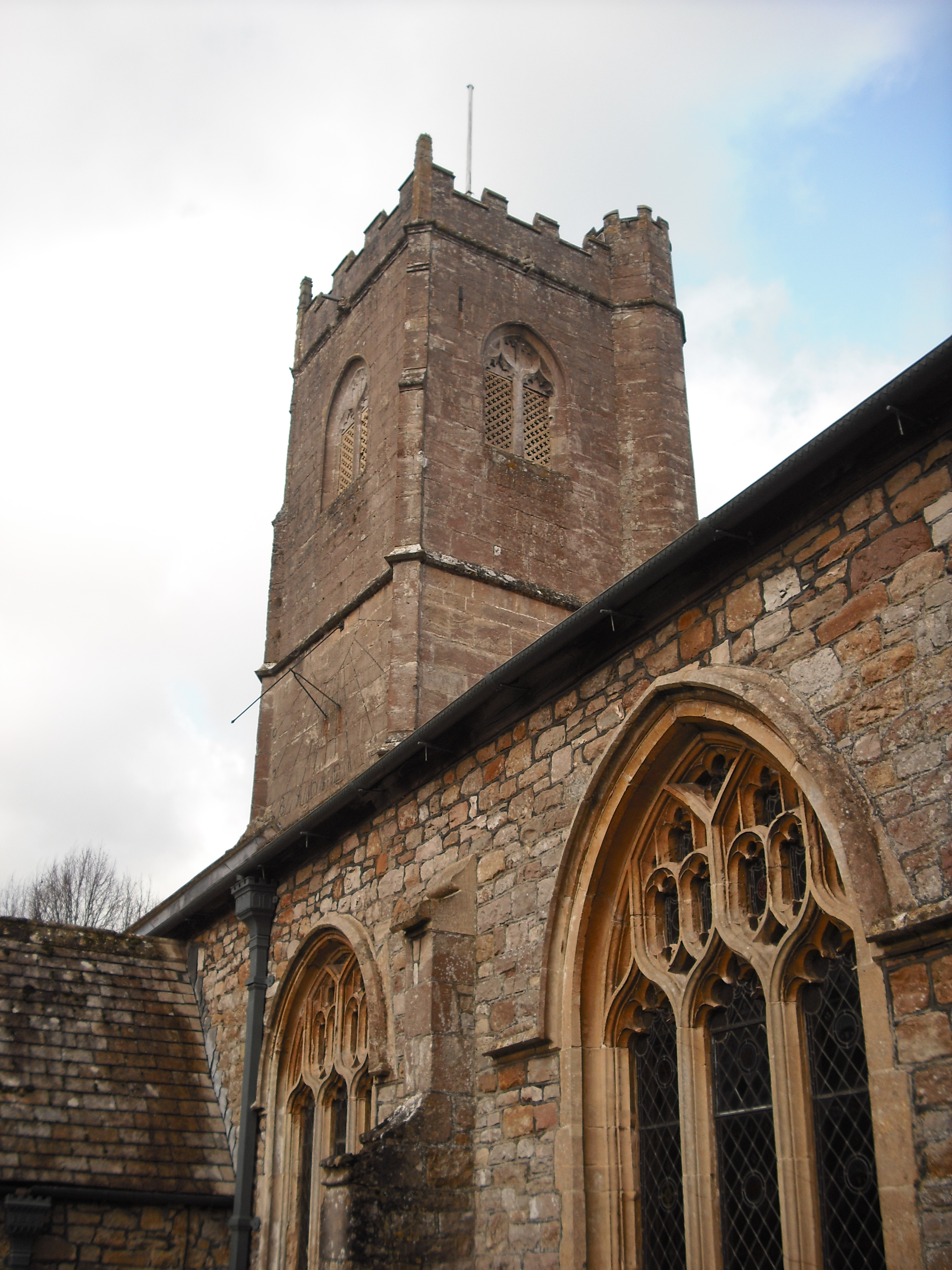
Tower from porch

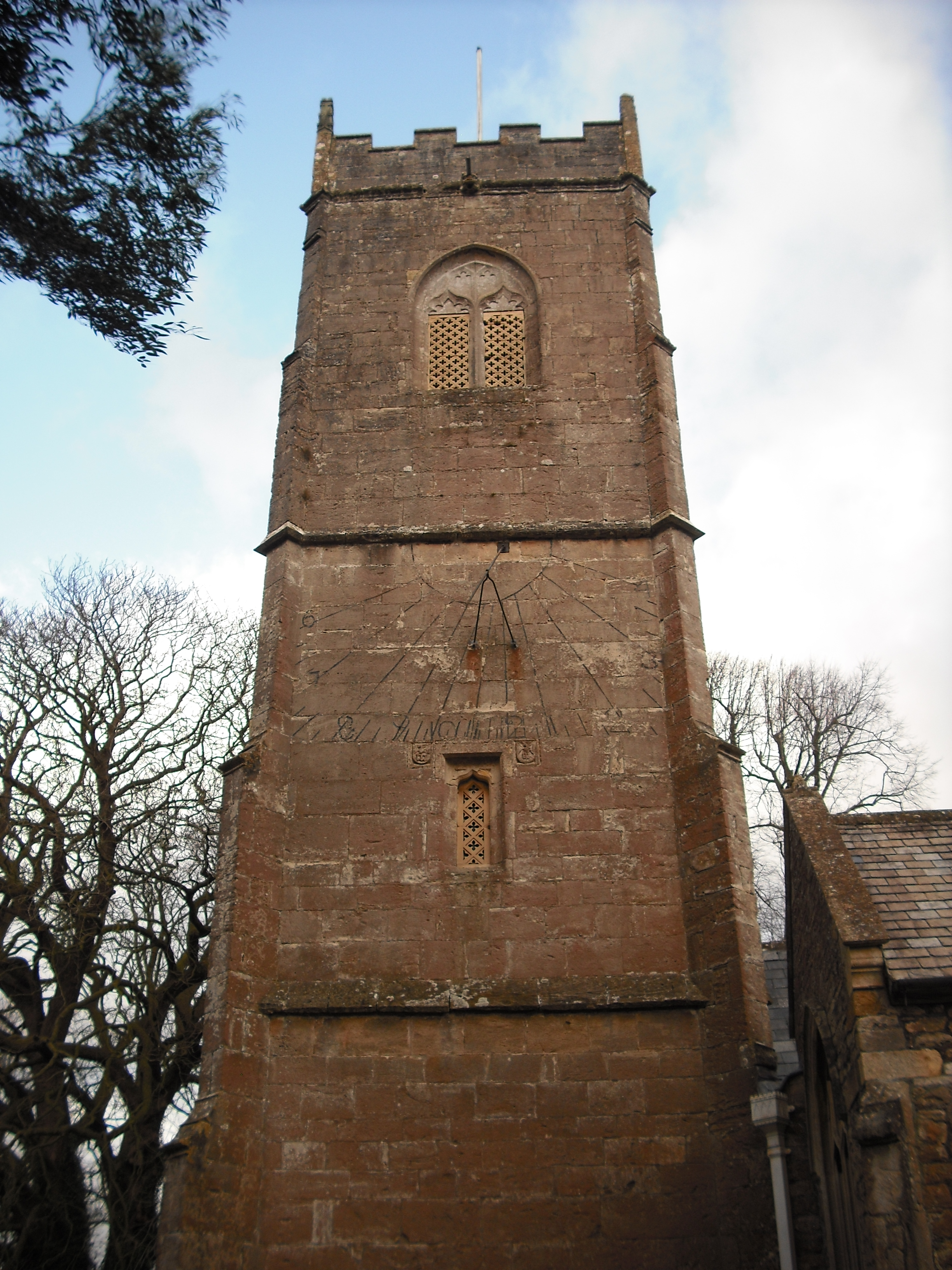
Tower with sundial

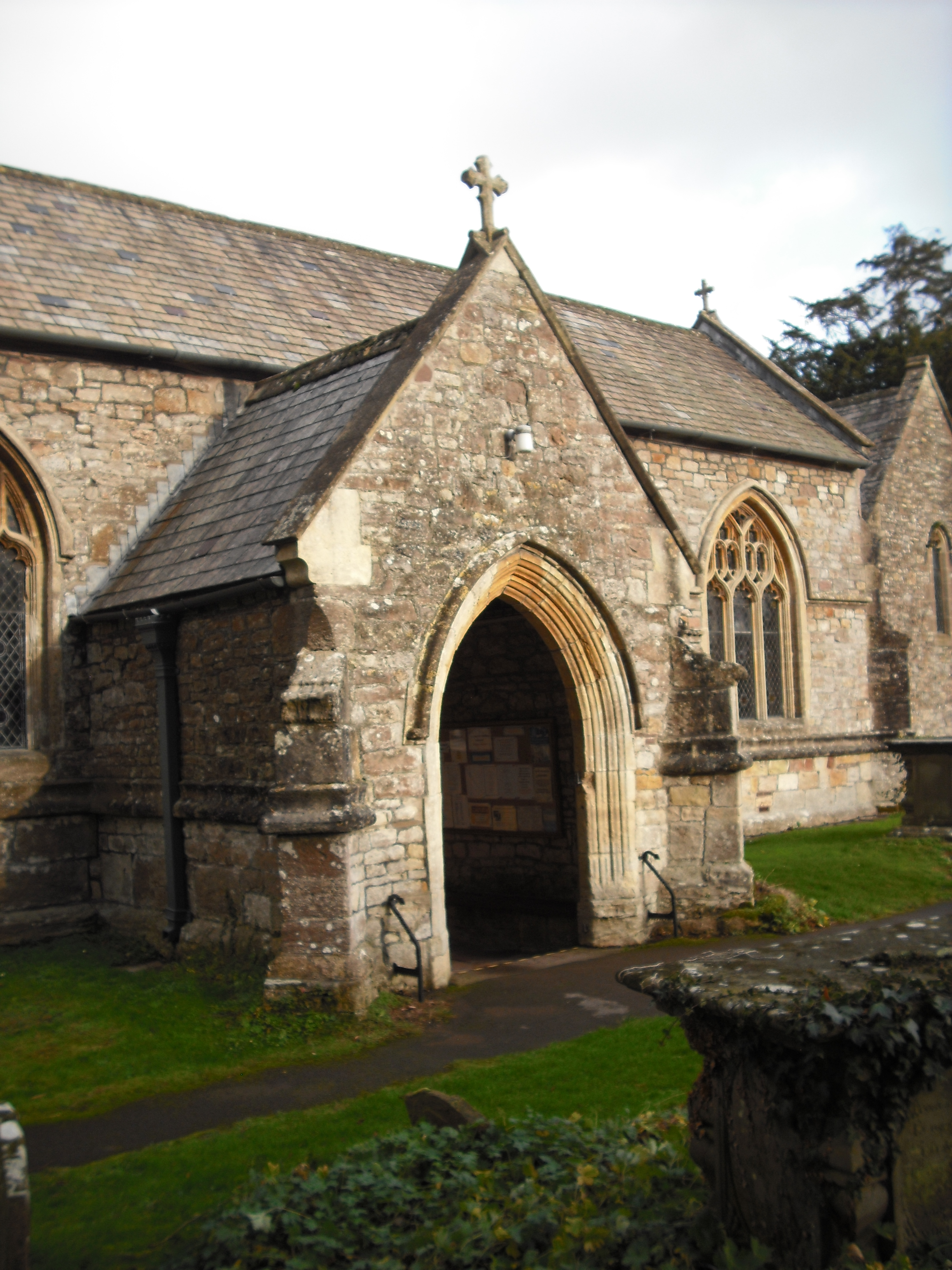
Porch

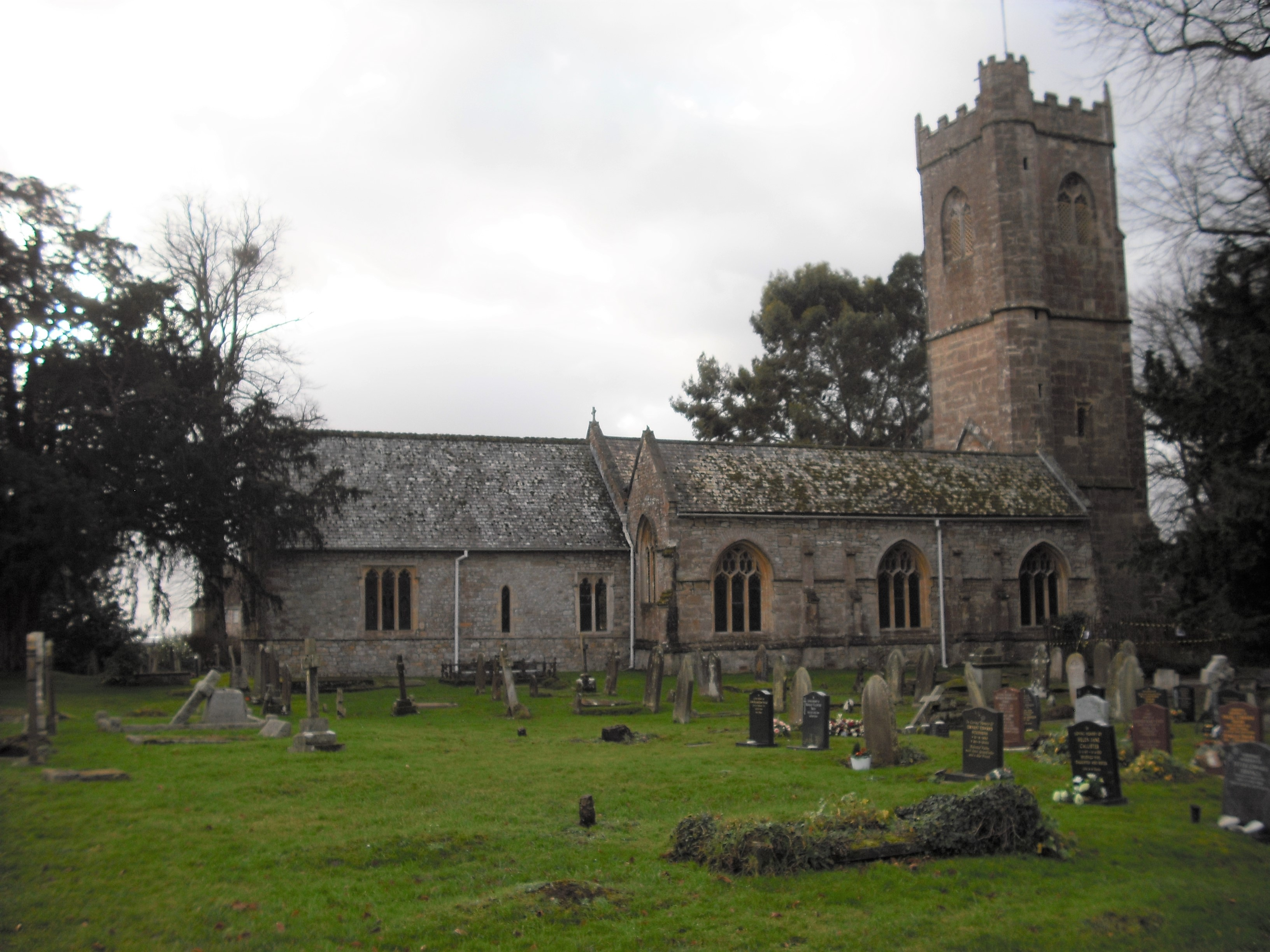
From the north

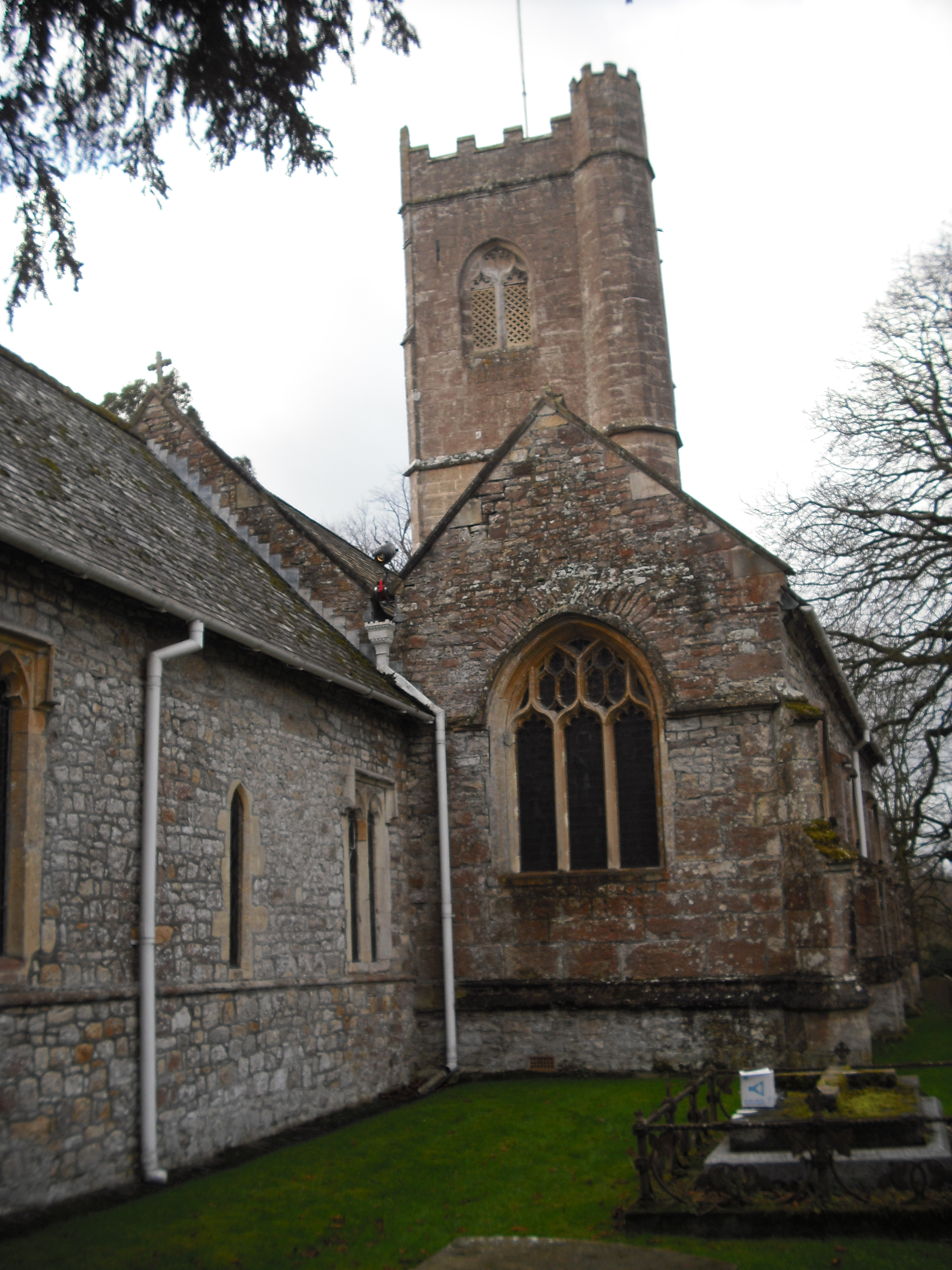
From the north east
