= Pwllmeyric =

Coordinates: 51°37′43″N 2°41′48″W

Pwllmeyric (Welsh: Pwllmeurig) is a small village in Monmouthshire, Wales, located 1 mile south west of Chepstow, on the A48 road within the parish of Mathern. The name Pwllmeyric means, in Welsh, "Meurig's pool" and refers to the pwll or creek of the Severn estuary which, before it silted up, linked the village to the sea. It was named for Meurig ap Tewdrig, king of the early Welsh kingdoms of Gwent and Glywysing in the 5th or 6th century, who buried his father Tewdrig (St. Theodoric) at Mathern.

The village is the presumed birthplace of Wales international footballer Eddie Parris, and the childhood home of rock musician Grant Nicholas.

The population in 2011 was 635.
