= John Russell (collier) =

John Russell (c.1788 – 1 March 1873) (Note: Although some sources give his date of birth as 1796, in Worcestershire, census records from 1851, 1861 and 1871 all give his place of birth as Broseley, Shropshire, in about 1788.) was a British coal and iron master, who had extensive industrial interests especially in the South Wales valleys in the mid-nineteenth century. He was High Sheriff of Monmouthshire in 1855.

== Biography ==
Russell was born circa 1788 at Broseley, Shropshire, but moved to Worcestershire early in his life. In 1817, at St John the Baptist, Claines, he married Mary Downes (1796–1878), daughter of Benjamin Downes of Alton Court, Herefordshire. Her family were said to look down on Russell's relatively humble origins; he vowed "that his wife would always have a carriage and pair". In 1820, he was recorded as a tobacco pipe maker at Cripplegate in Worcester. By the 1830s he was the owner of Worcester Pipe Works, Russells Brickworks, and many properties in the city.

He developed commercial interests in the Russell and Brown Risca Coal and Iron Joint Company, John Russell and Co., Blaina Iron Works, and later the South Wales Colliery Company. In 1836, John Russell and Co. bought Waunfawr Colliery near Risca with a site of 1,000 acres (400 ha), and in 1841 had a new mineshaft, known as Black Vein, sunk there. In partnership with Thomas Brown, he also took over the Blaina Iron Works in 1839. Many of his interests in South Wales were developed in partnership with George Randle Hookey of Ludlow (1808–1877), who in 1840 married Russell's daughter Susannah. In 1842, Risca Colliery employed 250 adults, 50 youths under 18, and 15 boys under 13 years of age. George Hookey gave evidence to the commissioners enquiring into the employment of children in mines, saying:

"In working the narrow seams we are compelled to use the labour of children as men are too large for the work, and, from the necessity of the case, boys from 11–15 years of age are employed to draw with the girdle and chain; distances not exceeding 300 yards, the weight drawn from 50 lb to 1 cwt. Very young children are of no service to us, as their strength is insufficient; they rarely commence until 10 years of age."

In 1842, John Russell and Co. were awarded the contracts to provide the steam coal to the East India Company, the Peninsular & Orient Company, and the Royal Mail Steam Packet Company. He took over the Cwmtillery Colliery in 1852, sinking new shafts there in 1853 and 1858, and in 1864 incorporated Cwmtillery into his South Wales Colliery Company.

It was said that Russell's collieries in South Wales were so prone to accidents that he had to bring workers in from Somerset, Dorset, Gloucestershire and Wiltshire. In 1846, an explosion at the Blackvein colliery at Risca resulted in the deaths of 35 men; more were killed in explosions in 1849 and 1853. The worst disaster occurred on 1 December 1860, when 146 men were killed in an explosion at the Blackvein colliery. As a result of the loss of life and legal arguments over rights with Lord Tredegar, the Risca Colliery Company was bankrupted, and the Blackvein colliery was sold.

Russell also had business interests in iron workings in the Forest of Dean, and in the Monmouthshire Railway and Canal Company. He was involved both in the development of Coalbrookdale near his birthplace, and, with Sir Charles Morgan, 1st Baron Tredegar, in developing port facilities at Newport.

During his activities in South Wales, Russell moved between Risca House, Wyelands near Chepstow, and Terhill House in Cheltenham. Having leased the neighbouring estate of Piercefield Park for several years Russell bought it 1855, but later sold it in 1866 to set up a trust for the families of the miners killed in the 1860 disaster at Blackvein and returned to Terhill. In 1867, he bought Badgeworth Court near Churchdown, Gloucestershire. He also owned a house in Westbourne Park in London.

Russell was appointed as a Justice of the Peace in 1842, and High Sheriff of Monmouthshire in 1855. He died in Cheltenham in 1873, and was buried at St Clements at the centre of his Worcester estates. His memorial is the east window of the church at Badgeworth.

Russell's eldest daughter Susannah married in 1840 his partner George Randale Hookey. In 1854 Russell's daughter Eleanor (1821–1884) married Thomas Henry Maudslay, grandson of the great engineer Henry Maudslay, with whom Russell had business interests. In 1856, Russell's son John Richard Russell JP (1831–1910) married Maria Frances, daughter of Sir Hugh Owen Bt of Orielton and niece of Sir Charles Morgan, 1st Lord Tredegar. They lived at The Lodge, Risca, and later at Coldbrook Park, Abergavenny. His second wife was Annette Willoughby-Hill, daughter of the banker Arnaud Clarke (Robarts, Lubbock, Bosanquet and Clark - later Coutts) and Anna Brett. Russell's daughter Ellen (1828–1902) married Col John Selwyn Payne, whose niece Rosina married Lt. Col Lawrence Heyworth and was to be Chairman of what had been John Russell's South Wales Colliery Company.
