= Meurig ap Tewdrig =

King in South Wales in 5th century AD

Meurig ap Tewdrig (Latin: Mauricius; English: Maurice) was the son of Tewdrig (St. Tewdric), and a King of the early Welsh Kingdoms of Gwent and Glywysing. He is thought to have lived between 400AD and 600AD, but some sources give more specific dates of c.596 - c.665.

Meurig took over the Gwent throne upon his father's abdication in the early 7th century. According to tradition, Tewdric became a hermit at Tintern, but later came to the assistance of Meurig, and they repelled the invading Saxons in a battle at Pont y Saeson (Bridge of the Saxons), Tewdrig died after the battle, and his son King Meurig buried him at Mathern, having an oratory built there and giving the surrounding land (including the area of the later village of Pwllmeyric, which translates from Welsh as 'Meurig's Pool' or 'Meurig's Creek', in his memory to the bishops of Llandaff.

Meurig reunited his kingdom with Ergyng (Archenfield) by marrying Onbrawst, the daughter of King Gwrgan Fawr (the Great) of that kingdom. He is said to have been a great patron of Llandaff Cathedral where he was eventually buried.

He was the father of Athrwys ap Meurig who, it has been postulated, was the real King Arthur who drove out the invading Saxons. Some researchers claim that Meurig used the title "Uther Pendragon", which translates as "fearsome chief warrior". Athrwys is believed to have pre-deceased Meurig, who was succeeded by his grandson, Morgan Mwynfawr.

Characters based on Meurig and Tewdric appear in Bernard Cornwell’s Warlord Chronicles series.
