= Mathern Mill =

Watermill in Monmouthshire, Wales

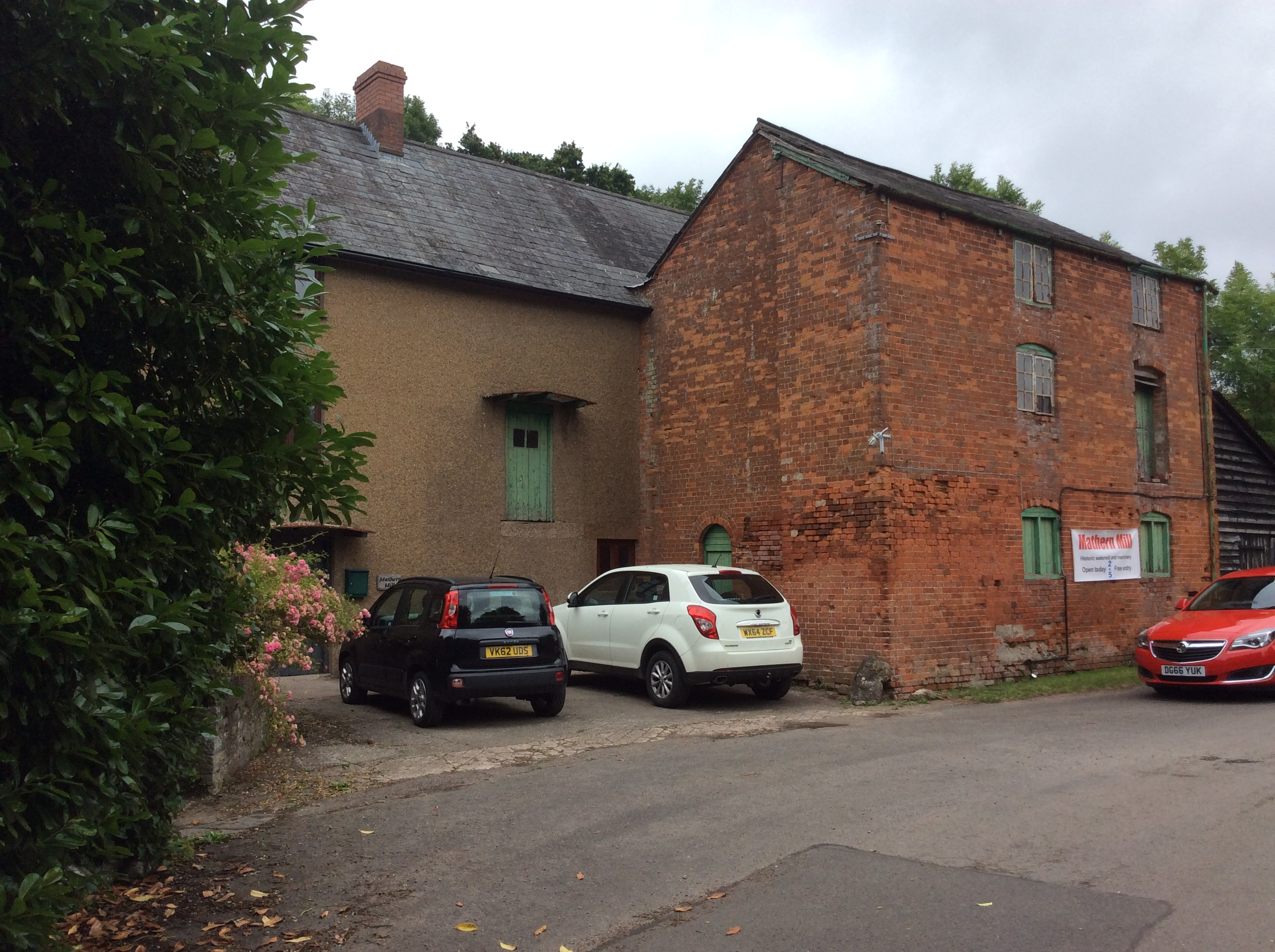
- " a large and fine early C19 watermill on an historic site"

- Location within Monmouthshire
- 51.6215°N 2.7014°W
- Type: Mill
- Location: Mathern, Monmouthshire

History
- Built: c.18th/19th centuries

Site notes
- Architectural style: Vernacular
- Governing body: Privately owned

Listed Building – Grade II*
- Official name: Mathern Mill and attached house
- Designated: 6 September 1974
- Reference no.: 2732

Mathern Mill, Mathern, Monmouthshire is a watermill dating from either the late 18th or early 19th centuries. It continued in use as a functioning mill until 1968. Retaining much of its 19th century mill workings, it is now open to the public on an occasional basis. It is a Grade II* listed building.

== History and description ==
A mill may have stood on the site since before the 18th century, Cadw suggesting a medieval origin, but the current building appears to date from the very late part of the 18th century or the early 19th century. The Royal Commission on the Ancient and Historical Monuments of Wales (RCAHMW) supports the view that the mill’s origins are medieval. The brick range facing the road is of c.1840. The mill was little altered from this time until its closure in 1968, and only minor modifications have been made since that date.

Of two ranges, the brick-fronted narrower range is of three-storeys and served as the engine house. The secondary range, set back from the road contained the miller's house on the left, and the mill room to the right. Cadw suggests that the main mill-working machinery is intact and in situ, but the interior was not inspected during the re-surveying of the building in October 2000. A Grade II* listed building, its listing describes it as "a large and fine early C19 watermill on an historic site, which is believed to retain much of its machinery".

The mill is privately owned but opens occasionally. As of September 2016, its owners were planning to re-open the mill for visitors in 2017.
