= Eddie Parris =

Welsh footballer (1911–1971)

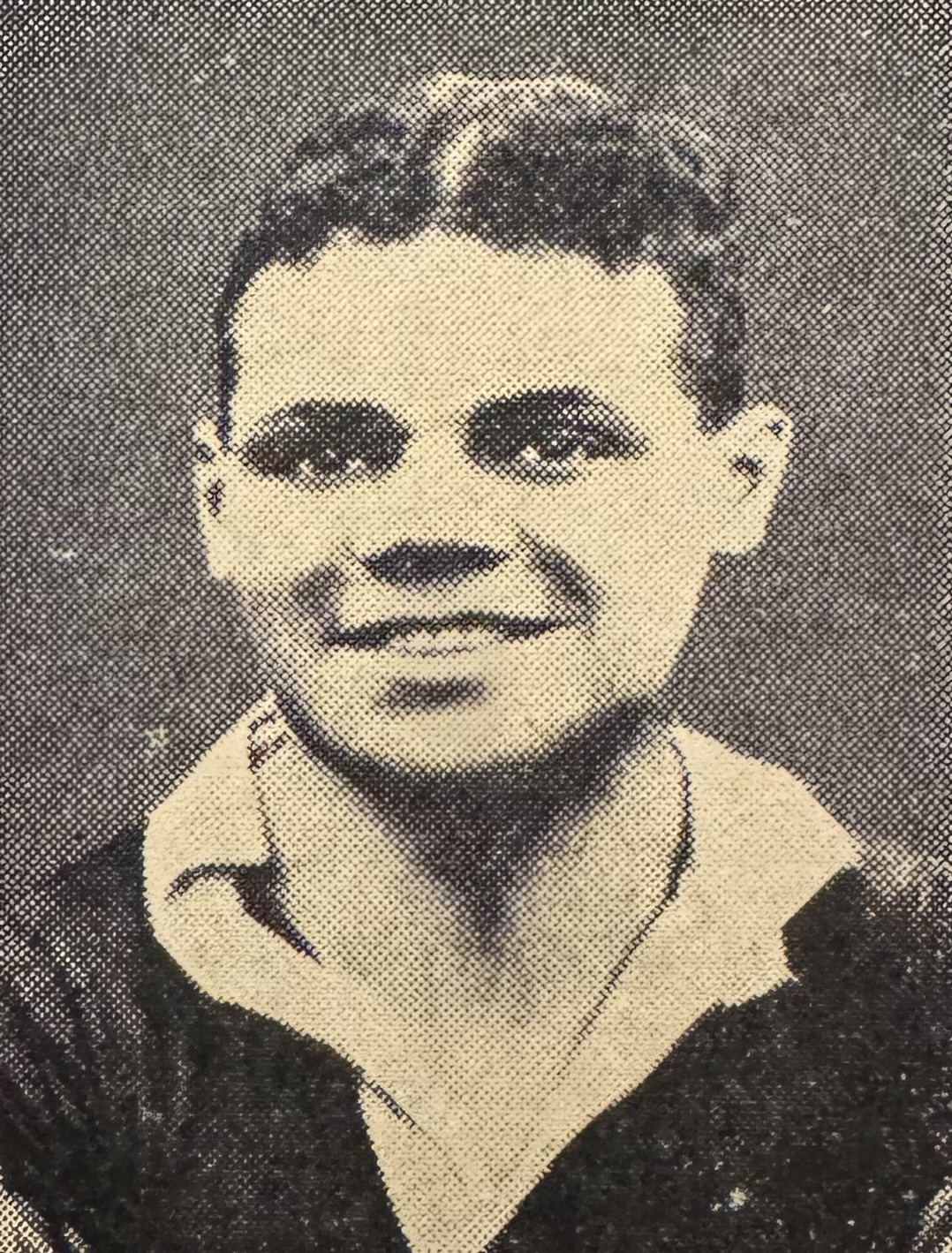

Personal information
- Full name: John Edward Parris
- Date of birth: 31 January 1911
- Place of birth: Pwllmeyric, Monmouthshire, Wales
- Date of death: 27 February 1971 (aged 60)
- Place of death: Gloucester, England
- Height: 5 ft 10 1/2 in (1.79 m)
- Position: Forward

Senior career*
Years	Team	Apps	(Gls)
1927–1928	Chepstow Town		
1928–1934	Bradford (Park Avenue)	133	(38)
1934–1937	Bournemouth & Boscombe Athletic	103	(23)
1937	Luton Town	7	(2)
1937–1939	Northampton Town	25	(7)
1939–19??	Cheltenham Town		
- Gloucester City

International career
1931	Wales	1	(0)
- * Club domestic league appearances and goals

John Edward Parris (31 January 1911 – 27 February 1971) was a Welsh international footballer, who played for Bradford Park Avenue, Bournemouth & Boscombe Athletic, Luton Town, Bath City, Northampton Town and Cheltenham Town. He was the first black player to represent Wales in an international, and over his career between 1927 and 1948 made 268 league appearances and scored 60 goals.

== Life ==
He was born in Ivy Cottage, Pwllmeyric, Chepstow, Monmouthshire, Wales, to a white mother, Annie Alford (née Clarke) from Leicester, England, and a black father, John Edward Parris (known as Eddie), who had been born in Barbados but moved to England in about 1900. Eddie Snr. served in the British Army during World War One and was awarded the British War Medal and Victory Medal.

From 1927, aged 16, Eddie Parris played for Chepstow Town His talents were spotted by scouts for Bradford Park Avenue, at the time a leading club, and he was signed as a trialist in 1928. He made his debut in January 1929, scoring his team's only goal in a drawn FA Cup match against Hull City, and thereafter established a regular first-team place at left wing. In his career at Bradford Park Avenue, he played 142 League and Cup games and scored 39 goals.

Parris became the first Black player for Bournemouth & Boscombe Athletic when he made his debut for them against Newport County on 27 August 1934. He achieved the same distinction at Luton Town on 13 March 1937, making his debut against Northampton Town. Later that year he also became the first Black player to represent Northampton Town in the Football League when he made his debut for them on 11 December 1937 (Northampton Town were playing in the Southern League when Walter Tull played for them from 1911 to 1914). Later in his career he became the first Black player for Cheltenham Town (then a Southern League side).

In December 1931 Parris made his first and only appearance for Wales against Ireland in Belfast, becoming the first black player to represent Wales in an international. Although sometimes cited as the first black player to play for any of the 'home countries', research now suggests that in fact the first was the Scotland player Andrew Watson.

In 1932 the Daily Mail wrote of him: 'Parris is speedy, has ball control, and is not a little football genius'. He suffered an injury in 1934, and later played for Bournemouth & Boscombe Athletic (1934–37), Luton Town, Northampton Town, Bath City, Gloucester City and Cheltenham Town. In December 1946 Parris was in the Cheltenham team that defeated his former club Gloucester City to win the Gloucestershire Northern Senior Challenge Cup. His final recorded match, as player-coach at Gloucester City, was in 1948.

He also worked in a munitions factory and, from 1939, for the Gloster Aircraft Company in Brockworth. He lived at Sedbury near Chepstow, and in Gloucester, where he died in 1971.

== Significance and legacy ==
Historian Martin Johnes of Swansea University studied Parris in order to explore black working-class experiences in early and mid 20th century Britain. Most people of colour left few historical traces but as a professional footballer, Parris was discussed in the press. Johnes shows that newspaper often described Parris in racial terms, but any overt racism Parris faced was not recorded. Nonetheless, given the racial attitudes of the time, Parris must have faced prejudices and the frequent references to his race in match reports and the like shows that people of colour were regarded as different in British culture.

A plaque to honour Parris was installed outside his birthplace in Pwllmeyric in 2021.
