= Robert Lugar =

Robert Lugar (1773 – 23 June 1855), was a British architect and engineer in the Industrial Revolution.

Although born in Colchester, England, Lugar carried out much of his most important work in Scotland and Wales, where he was employed by several leading industrialists to design grand houses such as Balloch Castle (1808), Cyfarthfa Castle (1824). The Ryes, formerly known as Rye Lodge, in Little Henny is a Grade II Georgian House designed by Lugar, whose engraving of the house and its plans were exhibited at the Royal Academy of Arts in 1809. The house was recognised by Nikolaus Pevsner during his survey of Essex. The Rectory in Yaxham, Norfolk, which is now known as Yaxham House, was designed for Rev John Johnson (1817), with its mirror image later used for Ffrwdgrech House in Brecon (1828). He designed Denham Mount in south Buckinghamshire for Nathaniel Snell, a London merchant and partner in George Baillie and Company and Wyelands in Monmouthshire, Wales, now owned by Sanjeev Gupta. Lugar also designed Bardon Hall (1837) in Leicestershire. Lugar published a pattern book in 1815 of cottages, rural dwellings and villas. Archibald Simpson worked for Lugar in his Holburn office from 1810. He died aged 82 at his London home in Kensington on 23 June 1855.
