= Tewdrig =

6th-century Welsh saint and king

Saint Tewdrig
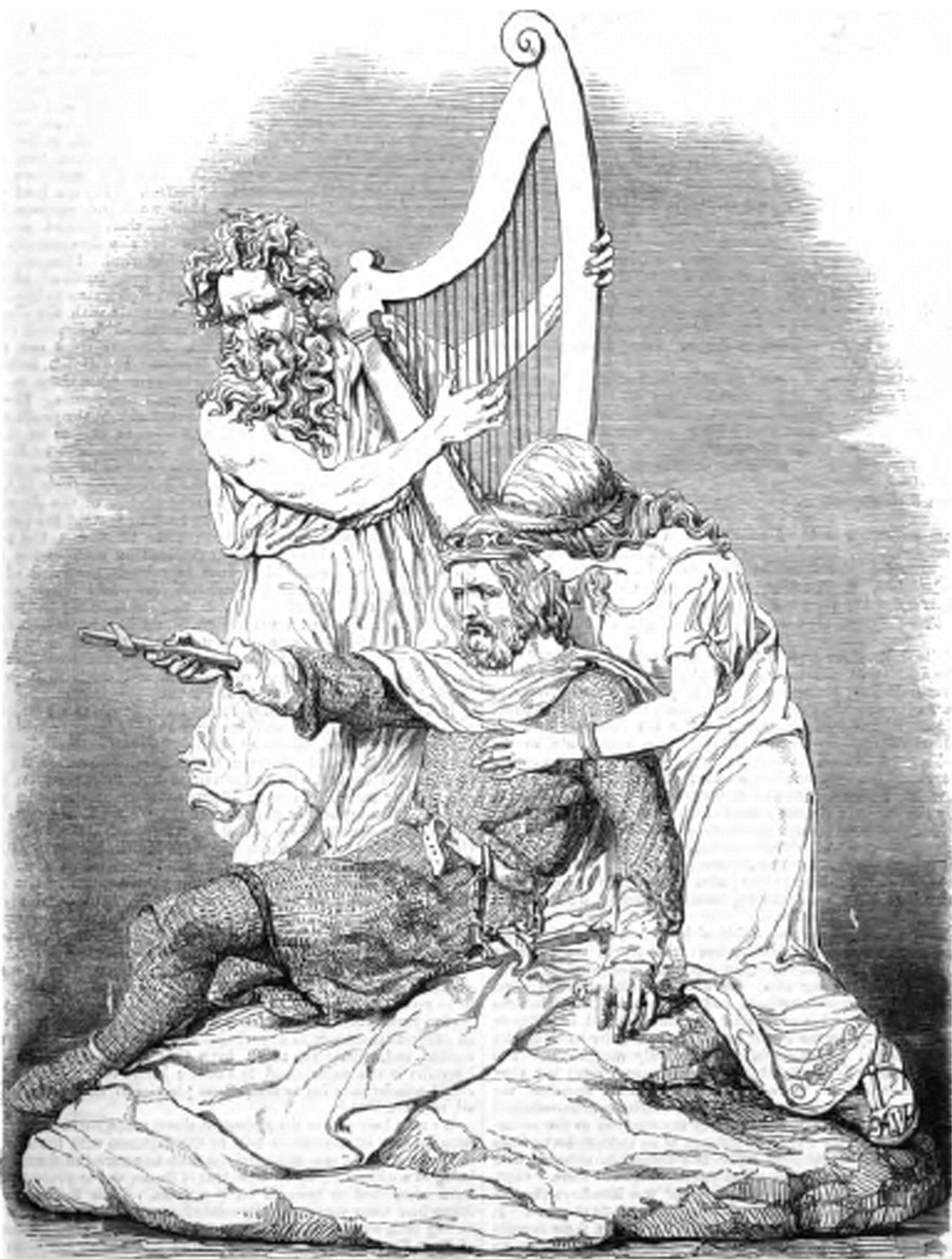
- Death of Tewdric after a sculpture by J. Evan Thomas

Martyr
- Born: fifth or sixth century
- Died: Mathern, Wales
- Venerated in: Roman Catholicism; Eastern Orthodox Church
- Major shrine: Church of St Tewdrig, Mathern
- Feast: 1 April

Tewdrig ap Teithfallt (Welsh pronunciation: [ˈtɛudrɪɡ ap ˈtɛiθvaɬt]; Latin: Theodoricus), known simply as Tewdrig, was a king of the post-Roman Kingdom of Glywysing. He abdicated in favour of his son Meurig (Maurice) and retired to live a hermitical life, but was recalled to lead his son's army against an intruding Saxon force. He won the battle, but was mortally wounded.

The context of the battle is one of Britons versus invading Saxons, without explicit religious overtones. Since Tewdrig held to a religious lifestyle and was killed while defending a Christian kingdom against pagans, by the standards of that day Tewdrig is considered to be a martyr and a saint. The Latin form of his name is given as 'Theodoric' and his feast day is 1 April. Tewdrig's name appears in a genealogy of Jesus College MS 20, in the line of one of his descendants, but the only substantive information about the person comes from the twelfth century Book of Llandaff.

The Book of Llandaff places Tewdrig's story in the territory of the historical Kingdom of Gwent (the southeastern part of modern Monmouthshire), though it states that he was a king of Glywysing. The ancient histories of the kingdoms of Gwent and Glywysing are intertwined, and he may have ruled both kingdoms.

== Life ==
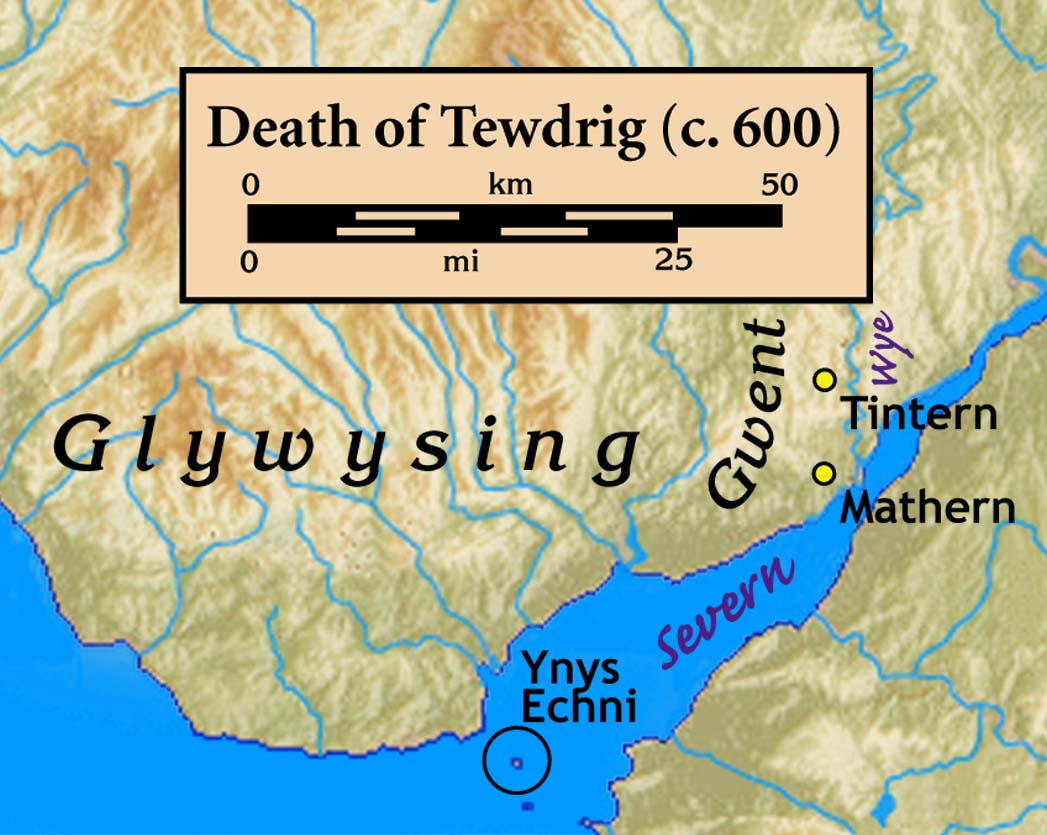
Places related to Tewdrig mentioned in the Book of Llandaff.

There are three theories about the origins of name Tewdrig:

- a variant of the Germanic name Theodoric;
- it may have been North British, as the name Theodric had been a royal name in Bernicia and/or;
- or the Breton royal name Theuderic.

Tewdrig's father, Teithfallt, had also been a king, and the Book of Llandaff notes that during his reign the Saxons had devastated the border regions, chiefly to the northwest near Hereford (i.e., in the historical Kingdom of Ergyng), and also along the River Wye.

While king of Glywysing, Tewdrig ap Teithfallt had been a patron of the Church at Llandaff, with a history of success in battle. At some point in his reign, he abdicated in favour of his son Meurig in order to live a hermitical life at Tintern, a rocky place near a ford across the River Wye. When a Saxon threat to the kingdom emerged, he returned to lead a defence. He was successful, but at a battle or skirmish at or near the ford (called Rhyd Tintern), he was mortally wounded. He asked to be taken to Ynys Echni (called Flat Holm in English) for burial, but got no further than Mathern on an inlet of the Severn estuary, where he languished briefly and died. King Meurig built a church on the spot and buried his father's body there, giving the surrounding land to the Bishops of Llandaff; a bishops' palace was later built there. The place became known first as Merthyr Tewdrig ("Tewdrig the martyr"), and later as Mateyrn ("place of a king") or Mathern. Tewdrig's defence of his homeland was said to be sufficiently decisive that the Saxons would not dare to invade again for thirty years.

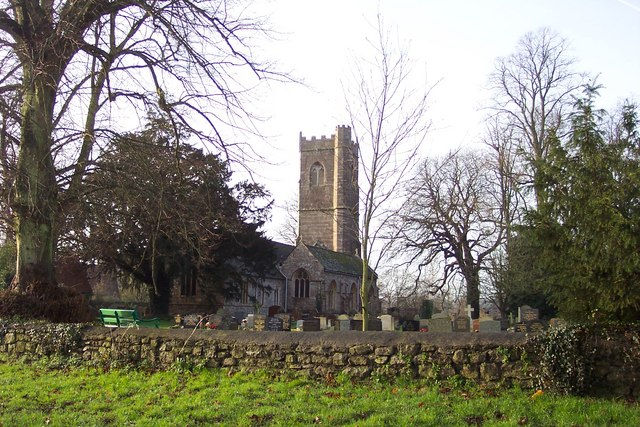
The Church of St. Tewdric at Mathern

There is a minor hagiographic element in this story from the Book of Llandaff. On returning to secular service due to military necessity, Tewdrig is given the prophecy that he will be successful but will be mortally wounded; that a vehicle pulled by two stags, yoked, will appear and carry him towards his destination of Ynys Echni, but that he will die in peace three days after the battle. Wherever the stags halted, fountains gushed forth, but as they approached the Severn the wagon was broken, a very clear stream gushed forth and here Tewdric died.

A number of sources, such as Ussher's Brittanicarum Ecclesiarum Antiquitates (1639), cite Bishop Godwin's 1615 account of the medieval church at Mathern. Godwin said that he discovered a stone coffin by the altar in the church, containing the saint's bones, and that the skull was badly fractured. Ussher also repeats the account of the Book of Llandaff. In 1958 the writer and illustrator Fred Hando recorded a story told to him by an old woman, long resident in Mathern, who claimed to have seen, in 1881, the opened coffin containing Tewdrig's body, with a wound to his skull still visible.

== Sources of information ==
=== The Book of Llandaff ===
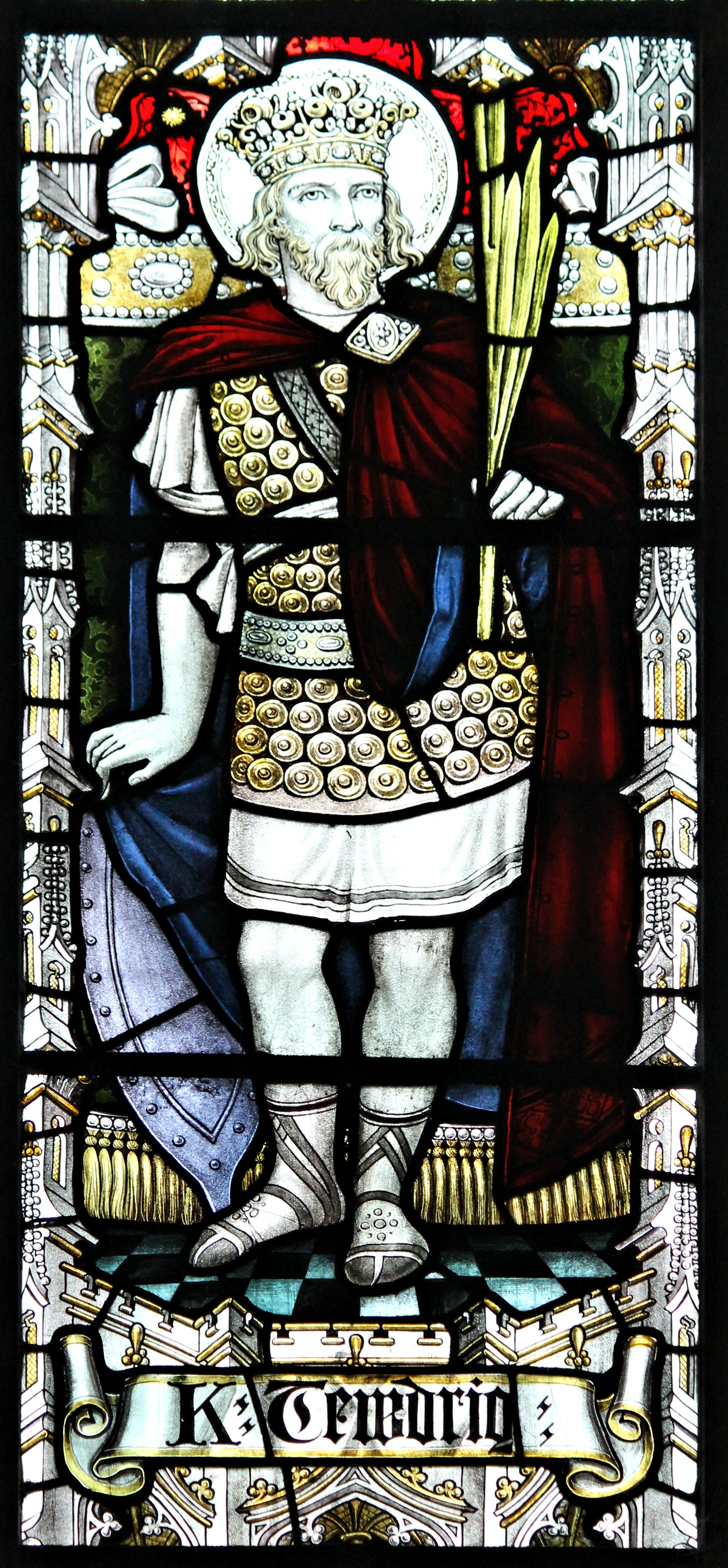
Representation of St. Tewdrig, stained glass, Llandaff Cathedral, Cardiff, South Wales. 156

The Book of Llandaff was written under Bishop Urban, following the Norman invasion of Wales when the Diocese of Llandaff was competing against the diocese of St Davids and Hereford. The book relates the narrative of King Tewdrig's life and justifies a number of Llandaff's claims by detailing an ancient charter of King Meurig ap Tewdrig that granted the territories at Mathern to Llandaff. Land given to a church by a King could also be claimed by secular rulers in medieval Welsh law. However, by emphasising the martyrdom story, the Mathern became classified as a merthyr (a martyr's shrine), making the territory sacrosanct, and an act of sacrilege for any rival bishop or Norman lord to seize it.

=== Other sources ===
Tewdrig is not mentioned by Nennius in the Historia Brittonum (c. 850). Lloyd's History of Wales (1911) mentions the Book of Llandaff's account of Tewdrig's combat at the crossing of the Wye, and notes that Merthyr Tewdrig is now called Mathern, but adds nothing further. Nedelec's History of the Early Cambro-British Christians (1879) retells the story from the Book of Llandaff, adding a number of unattributed details which are colourful but inconsequential. Turner's History of the Anglo-Saxons (1799) repeats the accounts of the Book of Llandaff and Bishop Godwin (citing Ussher as the source), but then adds that the Saxons in question were those of Wessex, led by Ceolwulf. No authority is provided for this claim.

== Sources ==
=== Bibliography ===
- Rees, William Jenkins (1840), The Liber Landavensis, Llyfr Teilo, Llandovery: William Rees — from MSS. in the Libraries of Hengwrt, and of Jesus College (English translation)
- Williams, Edward (Iolo Morganwg) (1848) [c. 1810], Williams (ab Iolo), Taliesin (ed.), Iolo Manuscripts, Llandovery: William Rees
