= Mathern =

Mathern: Welsh: Matharn/Merthyr Tewdrig
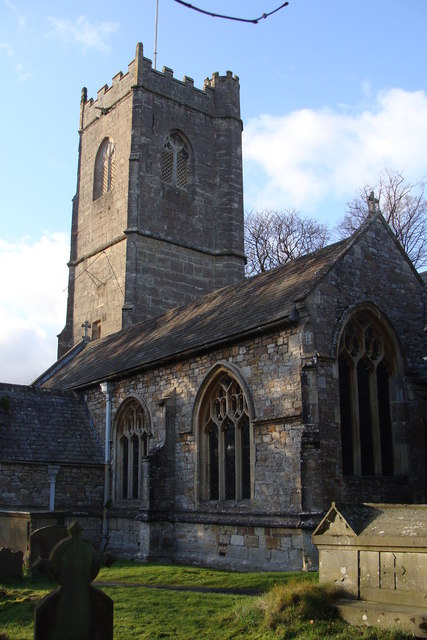
- St Tewdric's Church

- Location within Monmouthshire
- Population: 1,056 (2011)
- OS grid reference: ST522912
- Principal area: Monmouthshire
- Preserved county: Gwent
- Country: Wales
- Sovereign state: United Kingdom
- Post town: CHEPSTOW
- Postcode district: NP16
- Dialling code: 01291
- Police: Gwent
- Fire: South Wales
- Ambulance: Welsh
- UK Parliament: Monmouth
- List of places UK Wales Monmouthshire 51.61818°N 2.6917°W Map of the community

Mathern (Welsh: Matharn; older form: Merthyr Tewdrig) is a village, community, and historic parish in Monmouthshire, South East Wales, about 3 miles (4.8 km) south west of the town of Chepstow, close to the Severn Estuary, the Bristol Channel and the M48 motorway. The village is designated as a Conservation Area. It is bisected by the M4 motorway, which passes over the road through the village, with the original village located to the south and Newton Green to the north.

Almost adjoining Mathern, and within the community, is Pwllmeyric.

== Origins of the village ==
An authoritative local history suggests that the settlement originates from a time when the St. Pierre Pill, an inlet off the Severn Estuary, was larger and much more important than now, and met an ancient ridgeway which passed through Shirenewton towards Monmouth. The inlet was originally known as Porthiscoed ("harbour below the woods"), which, as Portskewett, later became the name of a nearby village.

Mathern was originally known as Merthyr-Tewdrig ("burial-place of Tewdrig"), after the martyrdom of St. Tewdrig, king of Gwent and Glywysing. According to the Book of Llandaff, Tewdrig (or Tewdric) was wounded at Tintern around the year 630, after fighting the invading Saxons with his son Meurig ap Tewdrig. His wounds were washed at a spring, where he died. A church was erected on the site of his burial at Mathern, and he was later revered as a martyr and saint. In his memory, Meurig gave the surrounding land, extending for several miles, to the Bishops of Llandaff. During the 12th century, the shorter name Mateyrn, meaning "place of a king", came into common use for the village; Meurig's name is perpetuated in the neighbouring village of Pwllmeyric.

The village is designated as a Conservation Area.

== Notable buildings ==
=== St Tewdric's Church ===
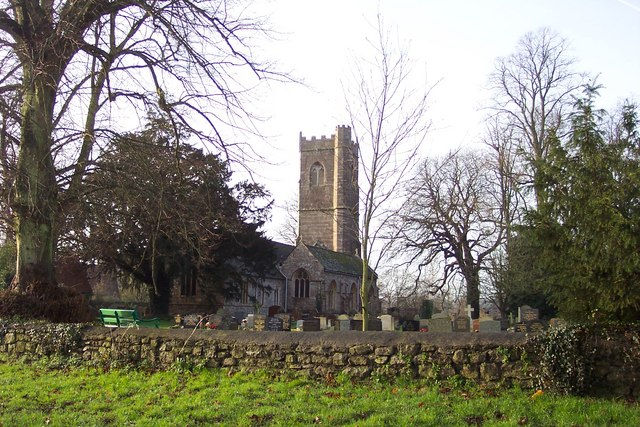
St Tewdric's Church

The existing parish church of St. Tewdric dates largely from the late 15th century, when it was rebuilt on an earlier foundation by John Marshall, Bishop of Llandaff, in the Perpendicular architectural style. However, parts dating from the 12th and 13th centuries are still visible. The church is the supposed resting place of St. Tewdric; on the north wall of the chancel is a tablet installed in the 17th century by Francis Godwin, Bishop of Llandaff 1601–1617, who claimed to have found the saint's stone coffin while repairing the church. The church also possesses several monuments to Bishops of Llandaff, up to the end of the 17th century. The building was heavily restored in the 1880s. Hando recounts the story told to him by an old lady who had lived in Mathern and who claimed to have seen for herself, in 1881, the stone coffin bearing the remains of St. Tewdrig with his mortal wound (a hole in the skull made by a spear-point) still visible. The medieval font was recovered from beneath the porch by Canon E.T. Davies in 1943. Close to the church is the ancient St. Tewdric's Well, mentioned by the historian Nennius in the 8th or 9th century. The church is a Grade I listed building as of 19 August 1955.

=== Mathern Palace ===
The Mathern estate was traditionally given to the Bishops of Llandaff by King Meurig. It is known that, by 1333, Mathern was one of three medieval palaces belonging to Llandaff (the others being at Bishton and at Llandaff itself); and, after Owain Glyndŵr's rebellion in the early 15th century, it was the only one kept habitable. Part of the existing building is dated to 1419. In his 1882 publication, local historian Octavius Morgan provides a description of three carved stones, showing symbols of the Holy Trinity, which once formed part of a grand gateway to the palace, but by then deposited by Lord Tredegar at the museum at Caerleon, dating from the time of Bishop John de la Zouch who held the See between 1408 and 1423. Most of the remaining buildings, however, date from the 16th century. The property fell out of use around 1700, became a farm, and was partly demolished around 1770. In 1894 the buildings were sold to architect and garden designer Henry Avray Tipping (1855–1933), who restored some of the buildings and developed a new garden in the Arts and Crafts style. The remains of the palace have been Grade I listed building since 10 June 1953.

Mathern Palace was sold in August 2014 and is now a private home. In 2019 the palace was again put up for sale for £3 million.

=== Moynes Court ===
Moynes Court is a Grade II* listed building. An earlier building was rebuilt as a private residence by Francis Godwin, Bishop of Llandaff, in about 1609/10, and much of the building remains from that period. Its grounds contain earthworks thought to be the foundations of an earlier moated manor house.

=== Wyelands ===
Wyelands is a large neoclassical villa, about 1 mile (1.6 km) north of the village. It was designed by Robert Lugar and was completed around 1830. It is also a Grade II* listed building. The Vaughan-Hughes family, who occupied the house between the late 19th and mid-20th centuries, built cottages and almshouses in Mathern for their employees, some dated to 1891.

== Sport and leisure ==
Mathern FC currently has three football sides playing in Gwent County League Division 2 and East Gwent Senior League Division 1 and Division 2.

In 2005/06 the club – then known as Mathern Wanderers – won the Harry Fishwick Cup defeating Monmouth Town F.C. At the start of the 2012/13 season Mathern Wanderers FC and members of Tintern Abbey FC amalgamated to become Mathern FC. This was a successful season for the new club, with the 1st team winning the East Gwent Division 1 title and the 2nd team winning the Fishwick Cup. Following ground improvements made during the close season, Mathern were promoted to the Gwent County League's Division Three. Mathern's first team won a further promotion – to Division 2 of the Gwent County League after finishing runners-up to Sebastopol FC at the end of the 2013/14 season. In the 2015/16 season, the club made the final of three cup competitions, winning two and losing one.

The Wales Coast Path passes through the village.

== Other sources ==
- Evans, C. J. O. (1953). Monmouthshire: Its History and Topography. W. Lewis.
