= Sheriff of Monmouthshire =

Welsh county ceremonial officer

This is a list of Sheriffs of Monmouthshire, an office which was created in 1536 but not fully settled until 1540.

On 1 April 1974, under the provisions of the Local Government Act 1972, the shrievalty of Monmouthshire was abolished, and replaced by the new office of High Sheriff of Gwent, covering a broadly similar area.

== List of Sheriffs ==
=== Served under Henry VIII ===
- 1540–41: Charles Herbert, of Troy House First High Sheriff
- 1541–42: Walter Herbert, of St. Julian's
- 1542–43: Walter ap Robert, of Pantglas
- 1543–44: Henry Lewis, of St. Pierre

=== Served under Edward VI ===
- 1544–45: Reynold ap Howel, of Perth-hir House
- 1545–46: John Harry Lewis, of Mathern
- 1546–47: Anthony Walsh, of Llanwern
- 1547–48: Thomas ap Morgan, of Pencoed
- 1548–49: Sir Charles Herbert, Kt. of Troy House
- 1549–50: Sir William Morgan, Kt. of Tredegar
- 1550–51: Walter Herbert, of St. Julian's (died in office and replaced by his son William Herbert
- 1551–52: William Herbert, of Coldbrook
- 1552–53: William Herbert, of St. Julian's

=== Served under Queen Mary I ===
- 1553–54: Anthony Walsh, of Llanwern
- 1554–55: Walter ap Robert, of Pantglas
- 1555–56: William John Thomas, of Treowen
- 1556–57: Rowland Morgan, of Plas Machen
- 1557–58: Henry Lewis, of Mathern

=== Served under Queen Elizabeth I ===
- 1558–59: Sir Thomas Morgan (or ap Morgan), Kt. of Pencoed
- 1559–60: Thomas Herbert, of Wonastow
- 1560–61: George James, of Troy
- 1561–62: Roger Williams, of Llangibby
- 1562–63: William Herbert, of Coldbrook
- 1563–64: William Herbert, of St. Julian's
- 1564–65: Sir William Morgan, Kt. of Tredegar
- 1565–66: John Henry Kemys, of Westgate House, Newport
- 1566–67: William ap John ap Rogers of Abergavenny
- 1567–68: William Morgan, of Llantarnam Abbey
- 1568–69: Christopher Walsh, of Llanwern
- 1569–70: Roland Morgan, of Llanvedon
- 1570–71: William Herbert, of Coldbrook
- 1571–72: Thomas Herbert, of Wonastow
- 1572–73: William Morgan, of Llantarnam Abbey
- 1573–74: Miles Morgan, of Tredegar
- 1574–75: Roland Kemys, of Vaendare
- 1575–76: Christopher Walsh, of Llanwern
- 1576–77: Rice Morgan, address unknown
- 1577–78: William John ap Roger, of Abergavenny
- 1578–79: William Lewis, of St. Pierre
- 1579–80: Sir William Herbert, Knt. of St. Julian's
- 1580–81: Thomas Morgan, of Machen
- 1581–82: Edmund Morgan, of Pencarn
- 1582–83: Edward Morgan, of Llantarnam Abbey
- 1583–84: Matthew Herbert, of Coldbrook
- 1584–85: William Lewes, of Abergavenny
- 1585–86: Rhys Morgan, address unknown
- 1586–87: John Jones, of Treowen
- 1587–88: Henry Morgan, of Penllwyn
- 1588–89: Henry Herbert (or Harbarte), of Wonastow
- 1589–90: Nicholas Harberte (or Harbarte), of Wonastow
- 1590–91: Edward Kemys, the Van of Kemys
- 1591–92: Walter Vaughn, of Cockhill
- 1592–93: Roland Morgan, of Bedwellty
- 1593–94: Walter Jones, of Magor
- 1594–95: Matthew Herbert, of Coldbrook
- 1595–96: Matthew Pritchard, of Llanvair
- 1596–97: Andrew Morgan, of Llanfihangel
- 1597–Jan 1598:Henry Herbert (died in Office)
- 1598–99: Henry Billingsly, of Penhow
- 1599–1600: Rhys Kemeys, of Kemeys
- 1600–01: Edward Kemeys, of Kemeys
- 1601–02: Edmund Morgan, of Llanternam

=== Served under James I ===
- 1602–03: Henry Morgan, of Penllwyn
- 1603–04: John Gaynesford, address unknown
- 1604–05: Roland Williams, of Llangibby
- 1605–06: Valentine Prichard, address unknown
- 1606–07: William Price, of Llanffoyst
- 1607–08: Sir Walter Montagu, Knt. of Penycoed
- 1608–09: Charles Jones (afterwards Sir Charles Jones), Knt. of Dingestow
- 1609–10: Henry Lewes, of St. Pierre
- 1610–11: William Rowlins, of Tregaer
- 1611–12: Sir William Morgan of Tredegar
- 1612–13: Roger Botherne, of Penhow
- 1613–14: Giles Morgan, of Pencoug
- 1614–15: William Jones, of Treowen
- 1615–16: Thomas Vaun, of Coldra
- 1616–17: Thomas Morgan (afterwards Sir Thomas Morgan), of Rhywperra
- 1617–18: George Milborne, of Wonastow
- 1618–19: William Hughes, of Cillwch
- 1619–20: Thomas Cocke, address unknown
- 1620–21: Walter Aldey, of Chepstow Hardwick
- 1621–22: Robert Jones, of Grandra
- 1622–23: William Walter, of Persfield
- 1623–24: David Lewis, of Llandewi

=== Served under Charles I ===
- 1624–25: Edward Morgan, address unknown
- 1625–26: Charles Somerset, of Troy
- 1626–27: Sir Charles Williams of Llangibby
- 1627–28: William Kemys (or Kymies, or Kemeys), of Kemys
- 1628–29: William Thomas, of Carlion
- 1629–30: John Walter, of Persfield
- 1630–31: William Barker, of Abergavenny
- 1631–32: Nicholas Kemeys of Llanvair
- 1632–33: Nicholas Arnold of Llanvihangel Crugcornen
- 1633–34: Lewis Van (or Vaune), of Coldra
- 1634–35: George Milborne, of Wonastow
- 1635–36: Henry Probert, of Pant glas
- 1636–37: Thomas Morgan, of Tymawr
- 1637–38: William Herbert, of Coldbrook
- 1638–39: Nicholas Moore, of Crick
- 1639–40: John Milborne, address unknown
- 1640–41: Edmund Morgan, address unknown
- 1641–42: Edmund Morgan, address unknown
- 1641–42: Thomas Morgan, of Llanfon
- 1642–43: Phillip Jones, of Treowen
- 1643–44: Thomas Price, of Llanffoyet
- 1644–45: Sir Edward Morgan, of Pencoyd
- 1645–46: William Herbert, address unknown
- 1646–47: William Morgan, of Pencrigge
- 1647–48: Henry Vaughn, of Caldicot

=== Served under Oliver Cromwell, Protector ===
- 1648–49: Christopher Catchway (or Katchway) Esq., address unknown
- 1650: Roger Williams, of Newport
- 1651: Thomas Williams, address unknown
- 1652: William Blethin Esq., address unknown
- 1653: Edward Kemis, of Bartholey
- 1654: Henry Barker Esq., address unknown
- 1655: John Price, Esq., address unknown
- 1656: Charles Herbert, of Hadrock
- 1657: Roger Oates, of Cefntilla
- 1658–59: Charles Vaun, of Coldra. Charles Vaun's appointment of Thomas Powell as under sheriff, dated 23 December 1658, recites that he had been appointed High Sheriff by the Lord Protector, of course for the year ensuing whence it seems he served two years in succession.
- 1660: Charles Vaun, of Coldra. Charles Vaun transferred prisoners to his successor Thomas Morgan, by deed dated 16 January 1661, indicating that he may have served a third term.

=== Served under Charles II ===
- 1661: Thomas Morgan of Machen
- 1662: William Jones
- 1663: George Dwynne
- 1664: Roger Williams
- 1665: Philip Cecil of Dyffryn
- 12 November 1665: Walter Morgan, of Llandeilo Patholly
- 7 November 1666: John Arnold, of Llanvihangel Court
- 15 November 1666: Christopher Perkins, of Pilston
- 6 November 1667: William Herbert, of Coldbrook
- 6 November 1668: John Arnold, of Llanvihangel Court
- 11 November 1669: Sir John Scudamore, 2nd Baronet, of Ballingham
- 4 November 1670: Roger Oates of Cefntilla
- 9 November 1671: Philip Jones of Llinarth
- 11 November 1672: Thomas Herbert, of Usk
- 12 November 1673: John Walter, of Piercefield
- 5 November 1674: John Gwynn, of Llangoun
- 15 November 1675: Rowland Prichard
- 10 November 1676: John Loof
- 15 November 1677: William Kemeys, of Kemeys
- 14 November 1678: James Herbert, of Coldbrook
- 13 November 1679: Thomas Morgan, of Penros
- 4 November 1680: William Jones, of Lanerissey or Abergavenny
- 1682: Edward Nicholls of Tre-llech
- 1683: John Gabb of Grosmont
- 1684: Walter Evans

=== Served under James II ===
- 1685: Robert Gunter of Abergavenny
- 1686: Nicholas Jones of Magor
- 1687: Richard Roberts
- 1688: Philip Jones of Llanarth
- 1689: Henry Probert of The Argoed, Penallt

=== Served under William III and Mary ===
- 1689: Thomas Morgan of Tredegar
- 1690: Charles Price of Llanfoist
- 1691: David Evans
- 1692: Edward Fielding of Tintern Parva
- 1693: John Floyer of Llantilio Perth-oleu
- 1694: Thomas Jones
- 1695: George Kemeys of Kemeys replaced by Henry Tomkins of Caerleon

=== Served under William III ===
- 1696: Edward Perkyns of Pilston
- 1697: John Morgan of Machen
- 1698: George Lewis of Pen-how
- 1699: George Kemeys of Kemeys
- 1699: William Blevin
- 1700: Edmund Morgan of Pen-llwyn
- 1701: Thomas Morgan of Llanrumney

=== Served under Anne ===
- 1702: William Lewis of Tre-worgen and Llanddewi Rhydderch
- 1703: David Lloyd of Hendre
- 1704: Lewis Morgan of Penylan
- 1705: Thomas Evans of Llangattwg Vibonavel
- 1706: John Carre of Rogerston Grange
- 1707: Vere Herbert of Caldecot
- 1708: John Springet of Grosmont
- 1709: David Lewis
- 1710: Christopher Perkyns of Pilstone
- 1711: Thomas Price of Llanfoist
- 1712: Giles Meredith of Llanelen
- 1713: John Walter of Persfield

=== Served under George I ===
- 1714: John Walter of Bersfield
- 1715: Christopher Price of Llanfoist
- 1716: William Jones of Usk Priory
- 1717: James Hughes of Gelli-wig
- 1718: Charles Van, of Llanwern
- 1719: Laurence Lord
- 1720: Edward Thomas
- 1721: Charles Probert of Tre-llech
- 1722: Henry Morgan of Bedwellty
- 1723: John Jones of Pant-y-goetre
- 1724: Matthew Powell of Llantilio
- 1725: Morgan Morgan of Llanromney
- 1726: Richard Lewis of Court-y-Gallon
- 1727: Edward Gore of Langston

=== Served under George II ===
- 1728: David Miles of Llandderfel
- 1729: Robert Jones of Grondry
- 1729: Lewis Morgan of Newport replaced by John Gwynn of Langoon
- 1730: Henry Nash
- 1731: Thomas Jenkins of Goytree
- 1732: Edmund Bradbury
- 1733: William Rees of St Brides
- 1734: Henry Morgan, of Penlloyne
- 1735: Richard Lewis of Court-y-gollen
- 1736: William Bonner
- 1737: Anthony Morgan of Lanethly
- 1738: William Seys of Gaer, Newport
- 1739: Paul Morgan of Chepstow
- 1740: Thomas Evans of Llangattwg Vibonavel
- 1741: Francis Jenkins
- 1742: Richard Clarke of the Hill
- 1743: Edward Perkins of Pilstone
- 1744: James Tudor Morgan of Llangattock Lingoed
- 1745: William Aldy of Hardwicke
- 1746: Thomas Jenkins of Glascoed
- 1747: John Day of Caldicot
- 1748: Aubrey Barnes of Monmouth
- 1749: Sydenham Shipway of Caldicott
- 1750: Philip Fisher of Monmouth
- 1751: Evan Jones
- 1752: Thomas Parry
- 1753: William Jenkins of Goytree
- 1754: John Chambie of Lanforst
- 1755: John Jones of Craigwith
- 1756: Daniel Treagose of Tregiriog House
- 1757: John Lewis of Landilo
- 1758: Rowland Pytt
- 1759: William Morgan of Bryn-gwyn
- 1760: William Curre, of Itton

=== Served under George III ===
- 1761: William Phillips of Whitson
- 1762: John Roberts of Abergavenny
- 1763: Allan Lord of Kemeys
- 1764: William Lloyd of The Hill, Abergavenny
- 1765: Solomon Jones of Llantilio Pertholeu
- 1766: William Winsmore of Pant-y-goetre
- 1767: Thomas John Medlicott, of Monmouth
- 1768: Richard Lucas of Llangattwg, Usk
- 1769: George Duberley of Dingestow
- 1770: Charles Milbome of Wonastow
- 1771: Thomas Fletcher of Monmouth
- 1772: Thomas Fydale of Chepstow, merchant
- 1773: Morgan Lewis of St. Pierre
- 1774: James Davis of Chepstow
- 1775: William Nicholl of Caerleon
- 1776: Philip Meakins of Hardwick, Monmouth
- 1777: Edmund Probyn of Newland
- 1778: Charles Price of Llanfoist
- 1779: William Addams Williams of Llangibby
- 1780: Thomas Hooper of Pant-y-goetre
- 1781: William Jones of Nash, Gloucestershire
- 1782: Edward Thomas [place not given]
- 1783: Elisha Briscoe of Dixton
- 1784: Christopher Chambre of Llanfoist
- 1785: William Rees, of St. Bride's
- 1786: Robert Salusbury, later Sir Robert Salusbury, 1st Baronet, of Llanwern
- 1787: Thomas Lewis of Chepstow
- 1788: George Smith of Persfield
- 1789: Thomas Lewis, of Saint Pierre
- 1790: William Dinwoody of Abergavenny
- 1791: William Harrison of Ton, Ragland
- 1792: David Tanner of Monmouth
- 1793: John Hanbury Williams of Coldbrook
- 1794: John Rolls of Dyffryn
- 1795: Richard Morgan of Argoed
- 1796: Henry Barnes of Monmouth
- 1797: Thomas Stoughton of Pontypool
- 1798: Robert Morgan Kinsey, of Abergavenny (replaced Joshua Morgan)
- 1799: Capel Hanbury Leigh of Pontypool
- 5 February 1800: Benjamin Waddington, of Llanover
- 17 March 1801: Thomas Williams, of Chepstow
- 3 February 1802: Thomas Morgan, of The Hill, Abergavenny
- 3 February 1803: George Jones, of Salisbury in Magor
- 23 April 1804: William Adams Williams, of Llangibby
- 6 February 1805: Joseph Price, of Monmouth
- 1 February 1806: William Phillips, of Whitston House
- 4 February 1807: William Partridge, of Monmouth
- 3 February 1808: William Morgan, of Mamhilad
- 6 February 1809: John Kemys Gardner Kemys, of Pertholey
- 31 January 1810: William Pilkington, of Hilston Park
- 8 February 1811: Hugh Powell, of Llanvihangel
- 24 January 1812: Charles Lewis, of St Pierre
- 10 February 1813: Samuel Homfray, of Penderren
- 4 February 1814: Sir Samuel Brudenell Fludyer, 2nd Baronet, of Trostrey
- 13 February 1815: Samuel Bosanquet, of Dingestow
- 1816: Sir Henry Protheroe of Llantarnam Abbey
- 1817: Robert Thompson of Tintern Abbey
- 1818: Nathaniel Wells, of Piercefield, the first black person to be appointed a sheriff
- 1819: George Buckle of Chepstow

=== Served under George IV ===
- 1820: Sir Robert Jones Allard Kemeys, Kt, of Malpas
- 1821: Charles Morgan Robinson Morgan of Tredegar
- 1822: James Jenkins of Chepstow
- 1823: Sir Joseph Bailey, 1st Baronet of Nant-y-glo
- 1824: John Partridge of Monmouth
- 1825: James Proctor of Chepstow
- 1826: Benjamin Hall of Abercarn
- 1827: William Addams Williams of Llangibby Castle
- 1828: William Morgan of Pant-y-Goetre
- 1829: Thomas Fothergill of Caerleon

=== Served under William IV ===
- 1830: William Jones, of Clytha Park was initially appointed but was replaced by Iltyd Nichol, of Usk
- 1831: William Hollis, of Mounton
- 1832: Sir Mark Wood, 2nd Baronet, of Rumney
- 1833: William Vaughan, of Courtfield
- 1834: John Buckle, of Mathern
- 1835: Charles Marriott, of Dixton
- 1836: George Rooke, of Llandogo
- 1837: Philip Jones, of Llanarth Court

=== Served under Queen Victoria ===
- 1838: John Jenkins, of Caerleon
- 1839: Colthurst Bateman, of Bertholey House
- 1840: Summers Harford, of Sirhowy
- 1841: Samuel Homfray, of Bedwellty
- 1842: John Etherington Welch Rolls, of The Hendre
- 1843: Sir Digby Mackworth, 4th Baronet, of Glanusk Park
- 1844: William Jones, of Clytha Park
- 1845: William Philips, of Whitson House
- 1846: Thomas Prothero, of Malpas Court
- 1847: William Mark Wood, of Rhymney
- 1848: Edward Harris Phillips, of Trosnant Cottage
- 1849: John Arthur Edward Herbert, of Llanarth Court
- 1850: Crawshay Bailey, of Llanthewy Court
- 1851: Ferdinand Hanbury Williams, of Coldbrook Park
- 1852: William Hunter Little, of Llanvair Grange
- 1853: Henry Bailey, of Nantyglo
- 1854: Thomas Brown, of Ebbw Vale
- 1855: John Russell, of the Wyelands, Chepstow
- 1856: Edward Bagnall Dimmack, of Pontypool
- 1857: Thomas Gratrex, of Court St Lawrence
- 1858: Godfrey Charles Morgan, of Tredegar Park
- 1859: Edward Mathew Curre, of Itton Court
- 1860: William Powell Rodney, of Llanvihangel Court
- 1861: James Proctor Carruthers, of The Grondra, near Chepstow
- 1862: John Best Snead, of Chepstow
- 1863: Henry Martyn Kennard, of Crumlin Hall, near Newport
- 1864: Henry Charles Byrde, of Goytre House
- 1865: Arthur Davies Berrington, of Panty-Goitre
- 1866: Frederick Cotton Finch of Blaenavon
- 1867: George Ralph Greenhow Ralph of Beech Hill
- 1868: Frank Johnstone Mitchell of Llanfrechfa Grange
- 1869: John Lawrence, of Crick House, Monmouthshire
- 1870: Edward Lister, of Cefn Ila
- 1871: Thomas Cerdes of Bryn Glas, Newport
- 1872: James Charles Hill of The Brooks, Abergavenny
- 1873: John Jefferies Stone, of Scyborwen
- 1874: Crawshay Bailey, of Maindiff Court, Abergavenny
- 1875: John Allen Rolls, of The Hendre
- 1876: Edward Kennard, of Park House, Blaenavon
- 1877: Charles Henry Crompton-Roberts, of Drybridge House, Monmouth
- 1878: John Capel Hanbury, of Pontypool Park, Pontypool
- 1879: James Murray Bannerman, of Wyastone Leys, Herefordshire
- 1880: Charles Edward Lewis, of Saint Pierre, Chepstow
- 1881: James Graham, of Hilston Park, Monmouth
- 1882: Thomas Phillips Price, of Triley Court, Abergavenny
- 1883: William George Cartwright, of Newport
- 1884: Richard Powell Rees, of Firs, Abergavenny
- 1885: George Lawrence of Trevella
- 1886: Joseph Firbank, of Saint Julian's, Newport
- 1887: Edmund Davies Williams, of Maesrydded (now Maes Manor), Newport
- 1888: Robert William Kennard, of Blaenavon
- 1889: Joseph Alfred Bradney, of Tal-y-coed Court
- 1890: Thomas Beynon of Castleton, Newport
- 1891: Thomas Firbank, of St. Julians, Newport
- 1892: William Curre, of Itton, Chepstow
- 1893: Arthur Evans, of Llangibby Castle, Monmouthshire
- 1894: Richard Leyborn of The Firs, Malpas
- 1895: Henry Hastings Clay, of Piercefield House, Chepstow
- 1896: Col. Robert Henry Mansel, of Maindiff Court, Abergavenny
- 1897: Lt. Col. Charles Montagu Crompton-Roberts, of Drybridge House, Monmouth
- 1898: Samuel Courthope Bosanquet of Dingestow Court
- 1899: Charles William Earle Marsh of St Helens, Newport
- 1900: John MacLean Rolls, of The Hendre (Second Baron Llangattock, 1912)

=== Served under Edward VII ===
- 1901: William Llewellin of Upton House, Poole, Dorset
- 1902: Edward Windsor Richards of Plas Llecha, Usk.
- 1903: Edward Pritchard Martin of Abergavenny
- 1904: John Davies James, of Myrtle Grove, Blackwood
- 1905: Sir Clifford John Corey, First Baronet, of Llantarnam Abbey
- 1906: Charles Herbert Firbank, of Glen Usk, near Caerleon
- 1907: Col. Charles Thomas Wallace, of Chesterholme, Stow Park, Newport
- 1908: Edmund William Thome Llewelyn Brewer-Williams Esq. of Maesrydded (now Maes Manor), Newport
- 1909: Edward Steer of Woodlands, Malpas
- 1910: Isaac Butler, of Panteg House, near Newport

=== Served under George V ===
- 1911: Sir Thomas Edward Watson, 1st Baronet, of Mary's Lodge, Newport
- 1912: Sir Frederick Mills, 1st Baronet of The Park Ebbw Vale
- 1913: Llewyllyn Llewylyn of Kings Hill, Newport
- 1914: William Gwilym Cristar James, of Llan Wysg, Crickhowell
- 1915: William Royse Lysaght, of Castleford
- 1916: John Paton, of Waun Wern, Pontypool
- 1917: Sir John Wyndham Beynon of Bryn Ivor (also Order of St. John of Jerusalem)
- 1918: Charles Oswald Liddell, of Shirenewton, Chepstow
- 1919: Gerald Mainwaring Vaughan Hughes, of Chepstow
- 1920: Sir Leonard Wilkinson Llewelyn, of Maplas Court, Newport
- 1921: Lieutenant Colonel Sir Henry Webb, 1st Baronet of Llynarthan
- 1922: Lieutenant Colonel John Charters Kirk, of St. Alberns, Christchurch, Newport. (Died during year of office, 1922. Acting Sheriff, Edward Coulman)
- 1923: Sir Richard Mathias, of Vaendre Hall, St Mellons
- 1924: Major Aubery Isaac Rothwell Butler, of Sandleford Priory, Newbury
- 1925: Captain Charles Crofts Llewellyn Williams of Llanrumney Hall, Llanrumney, Cardiff
- 1926: Charles Leigh Clay, Piercefield Park, Chepstow (Brother of Henry Hastings Clay, Sheriff 1895)
- 1927: Lionel Digby Whitehead of Goytre Hall, Abergavenny
- 1928: Major Albert Addams Williams, of Llangibby Castle, Monmouthshire
- 1929: William Percival Miles, of Monkstone Rumney
- 1930: Frederick Phillips, J.P. for County Borough of Newport
- 1931: Colonel John Evans, of Grouville, Stow Park Circus, Newport
- 1932: Sir William Henry Seager, Kt of Croft-y-Bwla, Monmouth
- 1933: Leonard Twiston Davies of Rockfield Park, Monmouth
- 1934: Major Claude Gilbert Martin of Stow Park Circus, Newport
- 1935: Edgar John Lewis of Troedy Chiw, Bedwas

=== Served under Edward VIII ===
- 1936: Edward Osborne Bennett of Llanvihangel Court, near Abergavenny

=== Served under George VI ===
- 1937: Frederick Pring Robjent, of Fields House, Newport, Monmouthshire.
- 1938: George Leighton Seager, of " Bryn Ivor Hall", Castleton, near Cardiff
- 1939: Captain Geoffrey Cartland Hugh Crawshay, of Llanfair Court, Abergavenny
- 1940: Alfred John Davies, of Stow Park Circle, Newport
- 1941: Arthur James, of Griffithstown, Pontypool, Monmouthshire
- 1942: Desmond Lysaght, of Castleford, Chepstow
- 1943: Andrew Norman Phillips, of Newport
- 1944: Lieutenant-Colonel Horace Cuthbert Rees Thompson, of Oakdene, Llantarnam
- 1945: Major Thomas Henry Vile, of Kia Ora, Waterloo Road, Newport
- 1946: Richard Wilson Bartlett, of Boughcliff, Tidenham Chase, Ohepstow
- 1947: Sydney Augustus Putnam, of Llantarnam Hall, Llantarnam
- 1948: Edward Wright Bennett, of Llwyndu Court, Abergavenny
- 1949: Colonel Robert Clifford Lloyd Thomas of The Shrubbery, Stow Hill, Newport
- 1950: Frank Longueville Dean of Glenusk, Llanhennock, near Newport
- 1951: Arthur Maynard Chesterfield Jenour of Crossways, Chepstow.
- 1952: Ernest Elijah Cashmore of Elmscott, Stow Park Circle, Newport.

=== Served under Elizabeth II ===
- 1953: Edward Connor Lysaght of The Conagar, Llandogo, Chepstow.
- 1954: David Ronald Phillips of Oakdene, Dewsland Park, Newport.
- 1955: Lieutenant-Colonel John David Griffiths, of The Cottage, Lower Machen.
- 1956: Colonel Edward Roderick Hill of St. Arvan's Court, Chepstow.
- 1957: Arthur Smith of Westover, Glasllwch Lane, Newport.
- 1958: Percy Charles Jones of Glasllwch House, Newport
- 1959: Rear-Admiral St. John Aldrich Micklethwait, of Penhein, near Chepstow.
- 1960: Brigadier Gerald Birdwood Vaughan-Hughes, of Wyelands, Chepstow
- 1961: John Wade Thomas of Rocklands, Glasllwch Lane, Newport
- 1962: David Nathan Rocyn-Jones of Cefn Eurwg, St. Mellons.
- 1963: Colonel Sir (Robert) Godfrey Llewellyn, of Tredilion Park, Abergavenny
- 1964: Colonel Henry Somerset Parnell Hopkinson, of Llanvihangel Court, near Abergavenny
- 1965: Henry Antony Patrick Clay, of Wyndcliffe Court, near Chepstow
- 1966: Lieutenant-Colonel Henry Morton Llewellyn, of Llanfair Grange, near Abergavenny
- 1967: Brian Ford Treverton Jones, of The Knoll, Clytha Park, Newport
- 1968: John Frederick Lovell, of "Broughton", Clytha Park, Newport
- 1969: John Graham O'Mahony Meade, of The Glyn Farm, Devauden, Chepstow
- 1970: Kenneth Roland Taylor, of Lansdown, 13A Ridgeway, Newport
- 1971: Gwyn Rocyn Jones, of Woodcote House, Five Lanes, Caerwent, near Newport
- 1972: Robin Arthur Elidyr Herbert, of Llanover, near Abergavenny
- 1973: Sir William James Cooper Thomas, 2nd Baronet, of Rockfield Park, Monmouth
- 1974 onwards - See High Sheriff of Gwent
