= Mathias baronets =

Title in the Baronetage of the United Kingdom

The Mathias Baronetcy, of Vaendre Hall in St Mellons in the County of Monmouth, was a title in the Baronetage of the United Kingdom. It was created on 28 June 1917 for the Liberal politician Richard Mathias. He was a partner of J. Mathias & Sons, shipowners, of Cardiff, and represented Cheltenham in the House of Commons from 1910 to 1911. He was later a deputy lieutenant of Monmouthshire. The baronetcy became extinct on the death in 1991 of his son, the second baronet.

== Mathias baronets, of Vaendre Hall (1917) ==
- Sir Richard Mathias, 1st Baronet (1863–1942)
- Sir Richard Hughes Mathias, 2nd Baronet (1905–1991)

== See also ==
- Vaendre Hall
