= William Herbert (planter) =

Member of the Parliament of England

Sir William Herbert (c. 1554 – 4 March 1593) was a Welsh colonist in Ireland, author and Member of Parliament.

== Early life ==
He was son of William Herbert of St. Julians in Monmouthshire, on a family estate lying between Caerleon and Newport. His mother was Jane, daughter of Edward Griffith. He was sole surviving legitimate heir-male of William Herbert, 1st Earl of Pembroke, as the great-grandson of Sir George Herbert of St. Julians, the earl's third son. Born after 1552, he was a pupil of Laurence Humphrey, President of Magdalen College, Oxford, presumed to have been a private pupil.

Herbert was a savant, and 1 May 1577 he sent John Dee notes for Dee's Monas Hieroglyphica. In 1581 he was residing at Mortlake, and enjoying Dee's learning. Thomas Churchyard the poet was another admirer, and Churchyard dedicated to Herbert his 'Dream,' which forms 'the ninth labour' of 'the first parte of Churchyardes Chippes,' 1575.

He was appointed a Justice of the Peace (J.P.) for Monmouthshire and High Sheriff of Monmouthshire for 1579–80. He was elected a knight of the shire (MP) for Monmouthshire in 1584, 1586 and 1593.

== In Ireland ==
On 14 February 1588 Herbert wrote to Francis Walsingham that he desired to show posterity his affection for his God and his prince 'by a volume of my writing,' by 'a colony of my planting,' and by 'a college of my erecting.' The first two objects he accomplished, the last he did not carry further than a plan to place a college at Tintern, where he owned a house and property. The colony was in Ireland. He was a relative and friend of Sir James Croft who had been lord-lieutenant of Ireland in 1551–2. Herbert became an 'undertaker' for the plantation of Munster on 5 May 1586, and on 17 June applied for three 'seignories' in Kerry. In April 1587 he arrived at Cork, and was allotted many of the confiscated lands which had been the property of Gerald Fitzgerald, 15th Earl of Desmond.

Herbert's property included Castleisland and its neighbourhood, and covered 13,276 acres. A vigorous colonist, he recommended that Desmond and Kerry should be combined into a single county; that the government should be wholly in English hands; that Limerick should be garrisoned and fortified, and that an army formed of Monmouthshire men should be maintained to resist foreign invasion. He also wished to see Kerry colonised by English gentlemen, and Irish customs such as tanistry abolished. Moderate in treating the Irish, he put into execution clauses of the statute against Irish customs, particularly forbidding the wearing of the native mantle. A zealous Protestant, he had the articles of the creed, the Lord's Prayer, and the Ten Commandments translated into Irish, and also directed the clergy on his estate to read religious services in Irish. With the Dean of Ardagh, whom he describes as inclined to papistry, he held many conferences, directing his attention to passages in Augustine of Hippo and John Chrysostom, and to works by Whittaker and Sadaell.

After nearly two years' residence at Castleisland, he acted as vice-president of Munster, in the temporary absence of Sir Thomas Norris, and sat on many commissions to settle disputes but Herbert's work was severely attacked by Sir Edward Denny, high sheriff of Kerry, and owner of Tralee and the neighbourhood, who complained of Herbert's self-conceit, and declared that his constables were rogues, and that the native Irish under his care were ruthlessly pillaged. Herbert replied that Denny encouraged pirates on the Kerry coast, and did not treat with consideration Irish converts to Protestantism. Herbert finally returned to England in the spring of 1589. Meiler Magrath, archbishop of Cashel, wrote of Herbert in complimentary fashion. Adam Loftus, the lord chancellor, and Sir Warham St. Leger wrote in similar terms, and emphasised Herbert's success as a Protestant missionary.

== Later life and death ==
On his return to England he entered the Middle Temple to study law. He provided his country house at Tintern for use as a religious college, dying before the project was due to start.

He died at St. Julians on 4 March 1593 whilst still in office as an MP and Custos Rotulorum of Monmouthshire.

== Family ==
He married early in life Florence or Florentia, daughter of William Morgan of Llantarnam, Monmouthshire, and left an only child, Mary, who was born about 1578. His two sons had been accidentally poisoned by poison set out by Sir William to kill rats. He settled by will, dated 12 April 1587, all his property, which included, besides St. Julians and his Irish estates, land in Anglesey and Carnarvonshire, upon his daughter, on condition that she married 'one of the surname of Herbert.' On 28 February 1599 she satisfied this condition by marrying her kinsman, Edward Herbert, later Lord Herbert of Cherbury, who thereby came into possession of St Julians.

On the petition of Herbert's widow and daughter, a new survey of his Irish property was made, and the rent reduced in 1596. Herbert's house at Castleisland was destroyed in the rebellion of 1598.

== Works ==
Herbert was author of:

- ‘A Letter written by a trve Christian Catholike to a Romaine pretended Catholike, vppon occasion of Controuersie touching the Catholike Church; the 12, 13, and 14 chapters of the Reuelations are briefly and truelie expounded,’ London (by John Windet), 1586, anonymous, with Sir William's arms on the back of the title-page.
- ‘A Poem intituled Sir William Herbertes Sydney’ was licensed by the Stationers' Company to John Windet on 16 January 1587. This may be identical with ‘Sidney, or Baripenthes; briefely shadowing out the rare and neuer ending landes of that most honovrable and praiseworthy Gent. Sir Philip Sidney,’ London (by John Windet), 1586.
- Herbert has been identified with the ‘Sir W. H.’ who signs a poor lyric in the ‘Phœnix Nest,’ 1593.
- A reply in Latin prose by Herbert to Edmund Campion's treatise in favour of Roman Catholicism ('Decem Rationes,' 1587) was not printed (Brit. Mus. Lansd. MS. 27, No. 7). John Strype refers to it in his life of Matthew Parker.
- 'Croftus; siue de Hibernia Liber;' an historical, political, and geographical treatise by Herbert on Ireland, also in Latin prose, and named in compliment to Sir James Croft, was first printed from a copy preserved among the Earl of Powis's manuscripts at Powis Castle for the Roxburghe Club, under the editorship of the Rev. W. E. Buckley, in 1887.
- Abstracts of three tracts by Herbert on the plantation of Munster appear in 'Calendar of Irish State Papers,' 1586–8, pp. 527–47. Also are printed many of Herbert's letters to Francis Walsingham and Lord Burghley, written while he was in Ireland.
