= Burslem Park =

Park in Stoke-on-Trent, Staffordshire, England

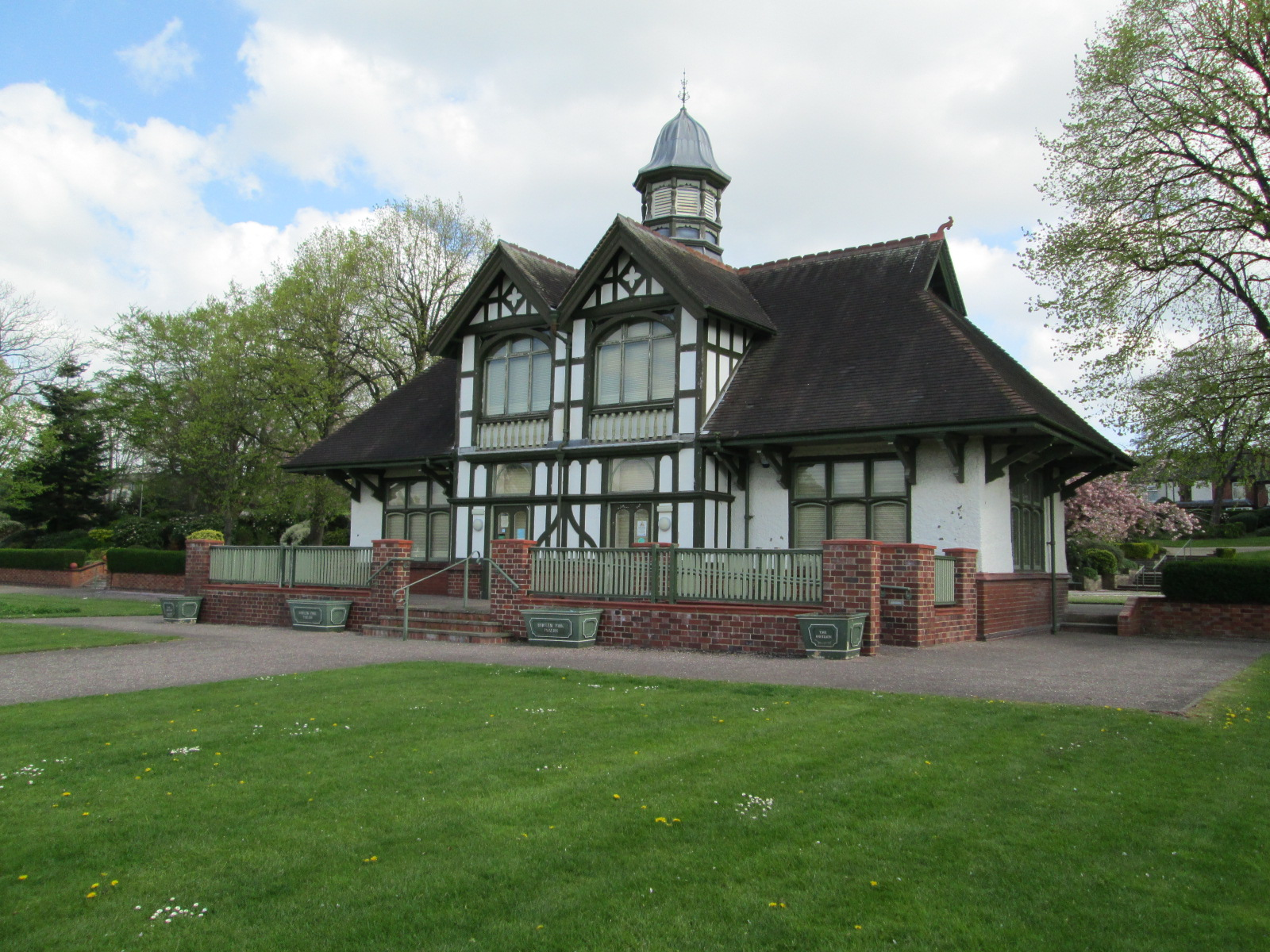
- The pavilion on the eastern edge of the Terrace
- Interactive map of Burslem Park
- Location: Burslem
- OS grid: SJ 874 502
- Coordinates: 53°2′55″N 2°11′22″W
- Area: 9 hectares (22 acres)
- Opened: 1894
- Designer: Thomas H. Mawson
- Operator: Stoke-on-Trent City Council
- Designation: Grade II*
- Website: www.stoke.gov.uk/directory_record/331198/burslem_park

Burslem Park is a public park in Burslem, Stoke-on-Trent, Staffordshire, England, operated by Stoke-on-Trent City Council. It was opened in 1894, and is essentially unchanged from the original layout. It is listed Grade II* in Historic England's Register of Parks and Gardens.

The park received a Green Flag Award in July 2023.

== History ==
The park, created on derelict industrial land, was designed by Thomas H. Mawson. Mawson had begun his career as a landscape architect designing gardens for country houses. He went on to design a number of public parks including Hanley Park. Work started in 1893; a great quantity of soil was brought to the site to lay out the park. It was opened on 30 August 1894.

A programme of restoration began in 2005 and was completed in 2012.

== Description ==
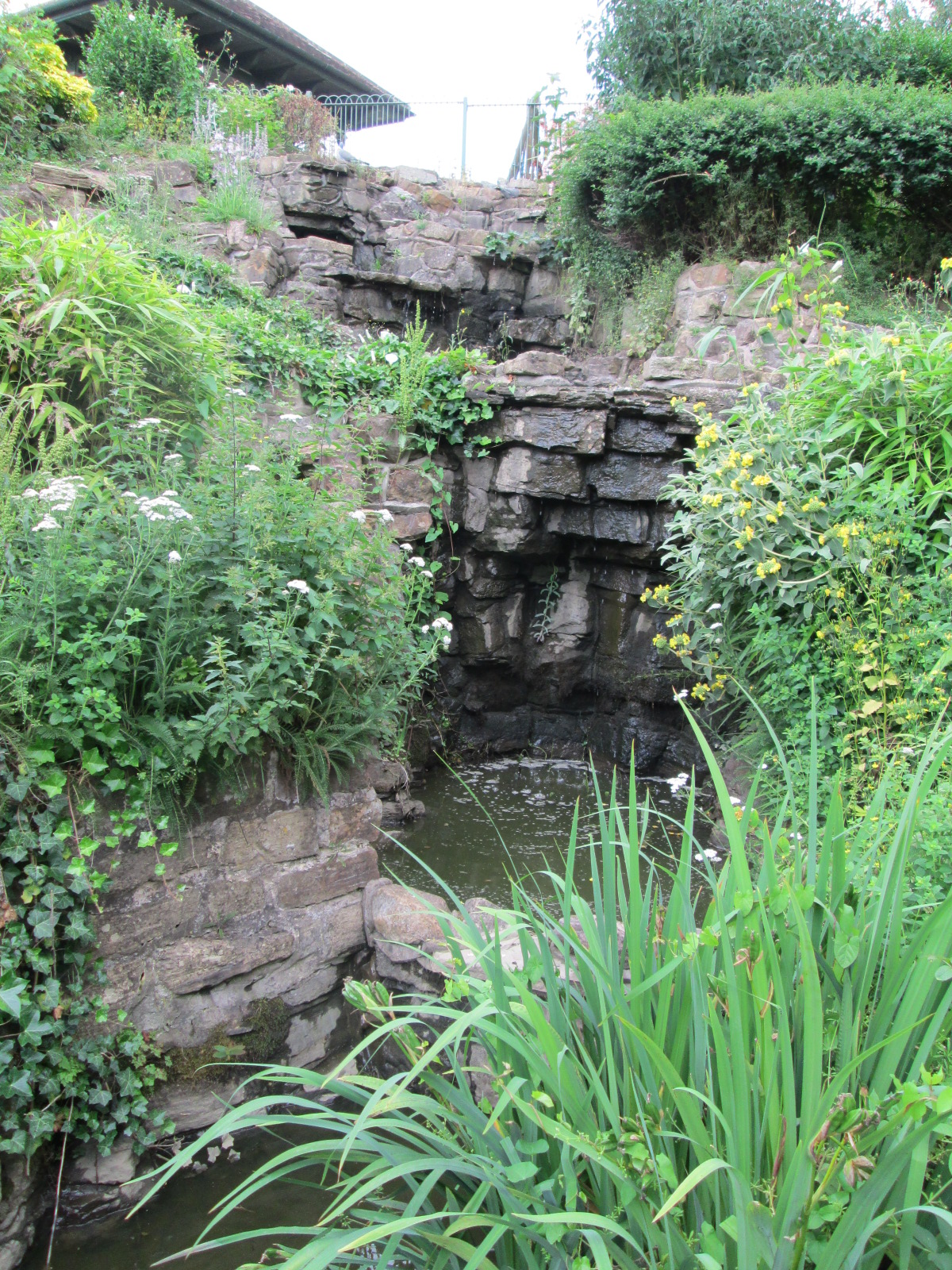
The Pulhamite rockery

The area of the park is 9 hectares (22 acres). There is a network of informal paths, with a tree-lined central grass area. On the west is an informal lake. On rising land at the northern end, on a former spoil heap, is an extensive rockery constructed of Pulhamite, through which runs an ornamental cascade.

On the eastern side of the park is the Terrace, along the edge of which is a formal terracotta balustrade. Steps lead up to either side of the bandstand; this is a cast iron structure erected in 2008, replacing the original wooden bandstand destroyed by fire in 2005. A pavilion, in Tudor Revival style, stands on the eastern edge of the terrace. Between the bandstand and the pavilion, on either side of the central axis, are two terracotta circular basins with simple fountains.
