= Thomas Hayton Mawson =

British garden designer, landscape architect, and town planner

Mawson's pergola in Hampstead for Lord Leverhulme.

Thomas Hayton Mawson (5 May 1861 – 14 November 1933), known as T. H. Mawson, was a British garden designer, landscape architect, and town planner.

== Personal life ==
Mawson was born in Nether Wyresdale, Lancashire, and left school at age 12. His father, who died in 1877, was a warper in a cotton mill and later started a building business. Thomas married Anna Prentice in 1884 and the Mawsons made their family home in Windermere, Westmorland, in 1885. They had four sons and five daughters. Their eldest son, Edward Prentice Mawson, was a successful landscape architect and took over the running of his father's firm when his father developed Parkinson's disease in 1923. Another son, John Mawson, moved to New Zealand in 1928 as Director of Town Planning for that country.

Mawson died at Applegarth, Hest Bank, near Lancaster, Lancashire, aged 72, and is buried in Bowness Cemetery within a few miles of some of his best gardens and overlooking Windermere.

== Working life ==
To make a living, he worked first in the building trade in Lancaster, then at a London nursery where he gained experience in landscape gardening. In the 1880s he moved back north, where he and two brothers started the Lakeland Nursery in Windermere. The firm became sufficiently successful for him to be able to turn his attention to garden design.

Mawson's first commission was a local property, Graythwaite Hall, and his work there showed his hallmark blend of architecture and planting. He went on to design other gardens in Cumbria such as Langdale Chase, Holehird, Brockhole, and Holker Hall around the turn of the century.

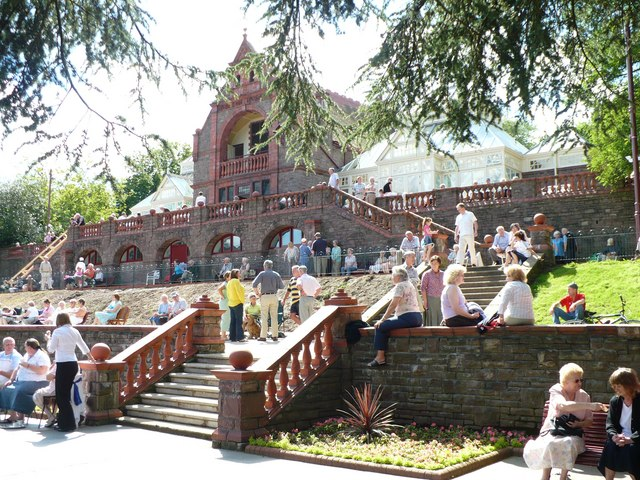
The Pavilion, Belle Vue Park, Newport

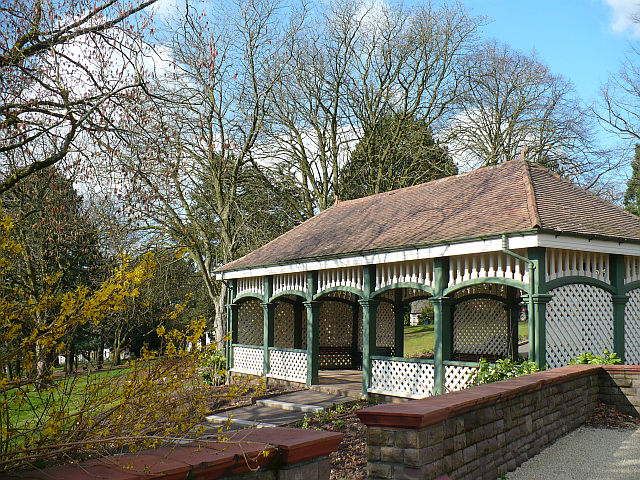
The Tea House, Belle Vue Park, Newport

In 1891 Mawson was commissioned to design and construct Belle Vue Park in Newport, Monmouthshire, Mawson's first win in an open competition. His design was, in fact, designed for the neighbouring field, the site of the then Newport and Monmouthshire Hospital after Mawson misunderstood directions on his first visit. The mistake was not realised until the first site visit, after the contract had been awarded.

Between 1894 and 1909 Mawson was commissioned to design and construct Dyffryn Gardens, the home of John Cory, in the Vale of Glamorgan. Mawson was the landscape designer for Glyn Cory Garden Village, funded by Cory and close to Dyffryn, in nearby Peterston-super-Ely. It was the first garden suburb in Wales. Other work in Wales included Maes Manor, near Blackwood, Caerphilly, for a local colliery owner, where Mawson extended the house and laid out an important garden.

In 1896, Mawson created the garden at Mount Stuart House on the Isle of Bute. The garden was said to have been inspired by the garden at Calvary and the Via Dolorosa in the Old City of Jerusalem.

Between 1902 and 1903 Thomas Mawson designed the summerhouse, balustraded terraces and pond within a formal garden for Albert Ochs at his new house at Walmer, Kent. Walmer Place was built in 1901 on the site of the earlier building known as Walmer Lodge. The summerhouse itself is of architectural merit with high quality stonework to its classical detailing and it survives largely intact. The designs for the gardens at Walmer Place were exhibited in 1903 at the Royal Academy.

The Rushton Hall estate in Northamptonshire has early 20th century formal terraced gardens designed by Mawson between 1905–1909 and implemented by his brother Robert. In 1908 Mawson was enlisted to design the main public park in the new town of Barrow-in-Furness.

In 1907 Mawson designed the terraced gardens for Lindeth Fell, near Windermere. The gardens remain remarkably intact; the terraces and richly planted borders sit the house in a relaxed style on a sloping hillside with views over lake Windermere to the Coniston mountains. Elizabeth Kissack's 2006 book on Mawson describes the gardens here as 'where Mawson excelled in making the garden seem to wrap itself around the house as if they were one'.

In London Mawson designed gardens at The Hill, in Hampstead for Lord Leverhulme. The impressive 800 ft long pergola is now open to the public as The Hill Garden and Pergola, part of the West Heath. He designed Rivington Gardens and Lever Park in Lancashire also for Lord Leverhulme. Padiham Memorial Park (1921) was another commission in Lancashire. Mawson also designed the gardens at Wood Hall near Cockermouth, Cumbria, which were completed in 1920. Much of this garden still survives today.

From 1910 to 1924 he lectured frequently at the school of civic design, Liverpool University. He also contributed articles on garden design to The Studio magazine and its annual The Studio Year Book of Decorative Art. In the 1920s he designed gardens for Dunira, a country house in Perthshire.

In 1924 he designed the Fazl Mosque in London.

In 1923 he became president of the Town Planning Institute, and in 1929 the first president of the Institute of Landscape Architects.

=== International work ===
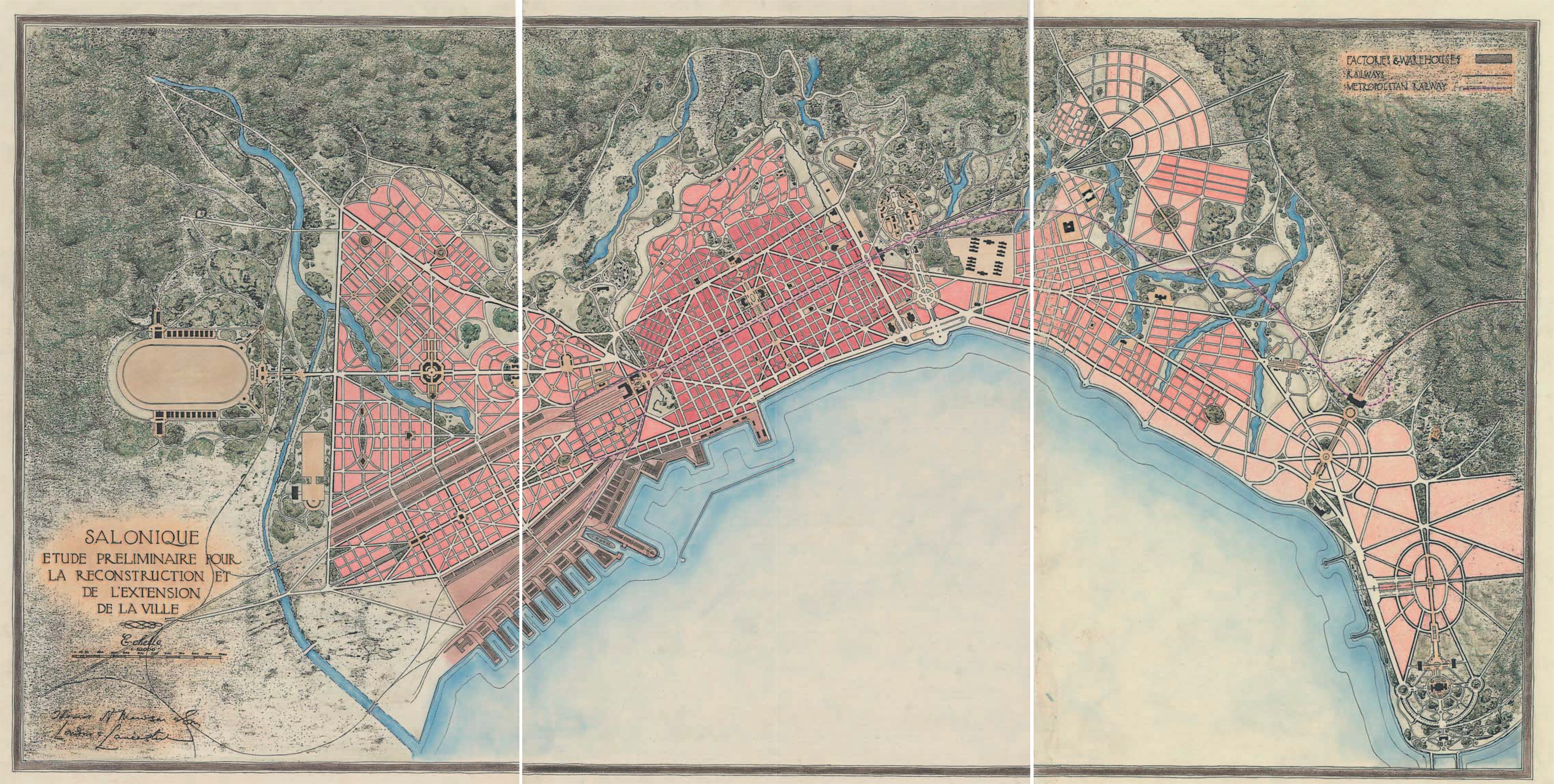
Proposal by Thomas Mawson for modern Thessaloniki (c. 1918), which shows a metropolitan railway line, in purple, running about the same route as the modern Line 1.

In 1908 he won a competition to lay out the Peace Palace gardens at The Hague. He also advised on the development of the Great Smoky Mountains National Park in the United States. In 1912 Mawson toured several Canadian cities, beginning in Halifax and ending up in Victoria, British Columbia. As well as giving talks, he proposed several (unaccepted) designs including for Wascana Centre in Regina, Brockton Point lighthouse, Coal Harbour and Lost Lagoon in Vancouver, and urban design plans for Banff and downtown Calgary. Mawson's vision for Calgary, had it been implemented, would have changed what was then a dusty prairie town, into a city of the City Beautiful movement.

== Preservation and restoration ==
With the passage of time many of Mawson's finished schemes have either disappeared or decayed out of all recognition. However, efforts have been made to preserve his designs by heritage listings (mainly the Register of Historic Parks and Gardens, although some of his structures such as the terraces at Rydal Hall are listed buildings). Also, a number of Mawson's parks and gardens have been restored, sometimes on a one-off basis or as part of wider initiatives such as the "Parks for People" programme for historic parks and cemeteries in the UK. Examples of restorations include:

- Rydal Hall, Cumbria, where Mawson's Grade II* listed Italianate terraces have been restored.
- Two Grade II* listed municipal parks in the city of Stoke-on-Trent (Hanley Park and Burslem Park)
- Bushey Rose Garden, Hertfordshire (Grade II listed).
- The Hill Garden and Pergola, Hampstead Heath, designed for Lord Leverhulme.

In 2019, work started on the restoration of Mawson's garden at Mount Stuart House. The work was due to be completed in August 2022.

== Archive ==
More than 14,000 plans and drawings together with 6,500 glass plate negatives and photographs comprise the archive of Mawson documents. They are stored at Cumbria Archive Centre, Kendal, having been offered to the Cumbria Archive Service following the closure of Thomas H. Mawson & Son of Lancaster and Windermere in 1978. Catalogue of Thomas Mawson collection held at Cumbria Archive Centre, Kendal

== Selected writings ==
- 1900: The Art and Craft of Garden Making, 1st edn 1900, 5th edn (recommended), 1926.
- 1908: "The Designing of Gardens", article in The Studio Year Book of Decorative Art 1908
- 1911: Civic Art Covers the principles of town planning
- 1927: The Life and Work of an English Landscape Architect

== See also ==
- Morecambe and Heysham War Memorial, a Mawson design

== Bibliography ==
- Tankard, Judith B. (2018). Gardens of the Arts & Craft Movement (Hardback). Portland, Oregon: Timber Press. ISBN 978-1-604698-20-6.
- Waymark, Janet (2009). Thomas Mawson: life, gardens and landscapes. London: Frances Lincoln. ISBN 978-0-7112-2595-4.
