= Maes Manor =

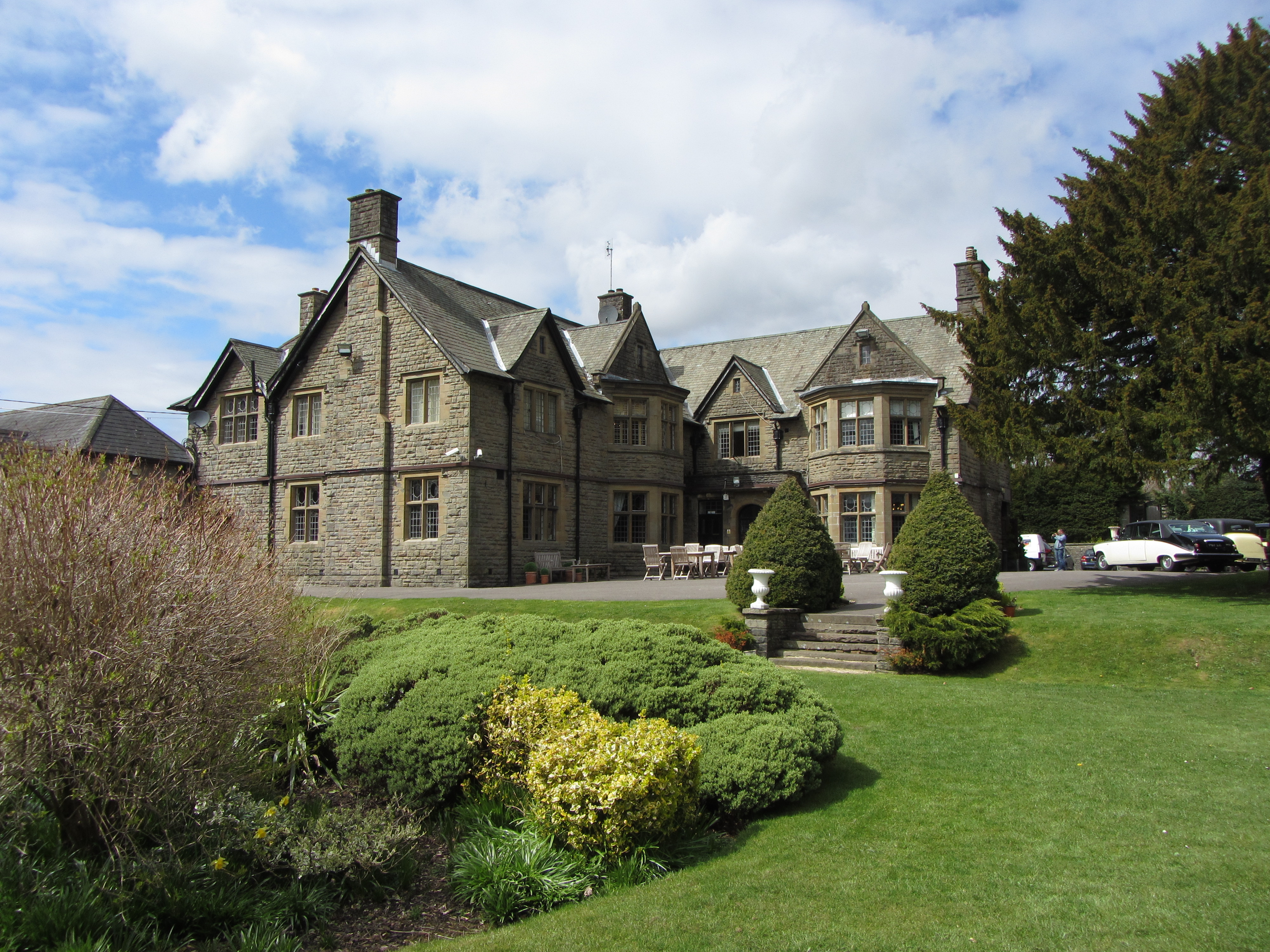
- "A Jewel Stuck into a Lump of Lead"

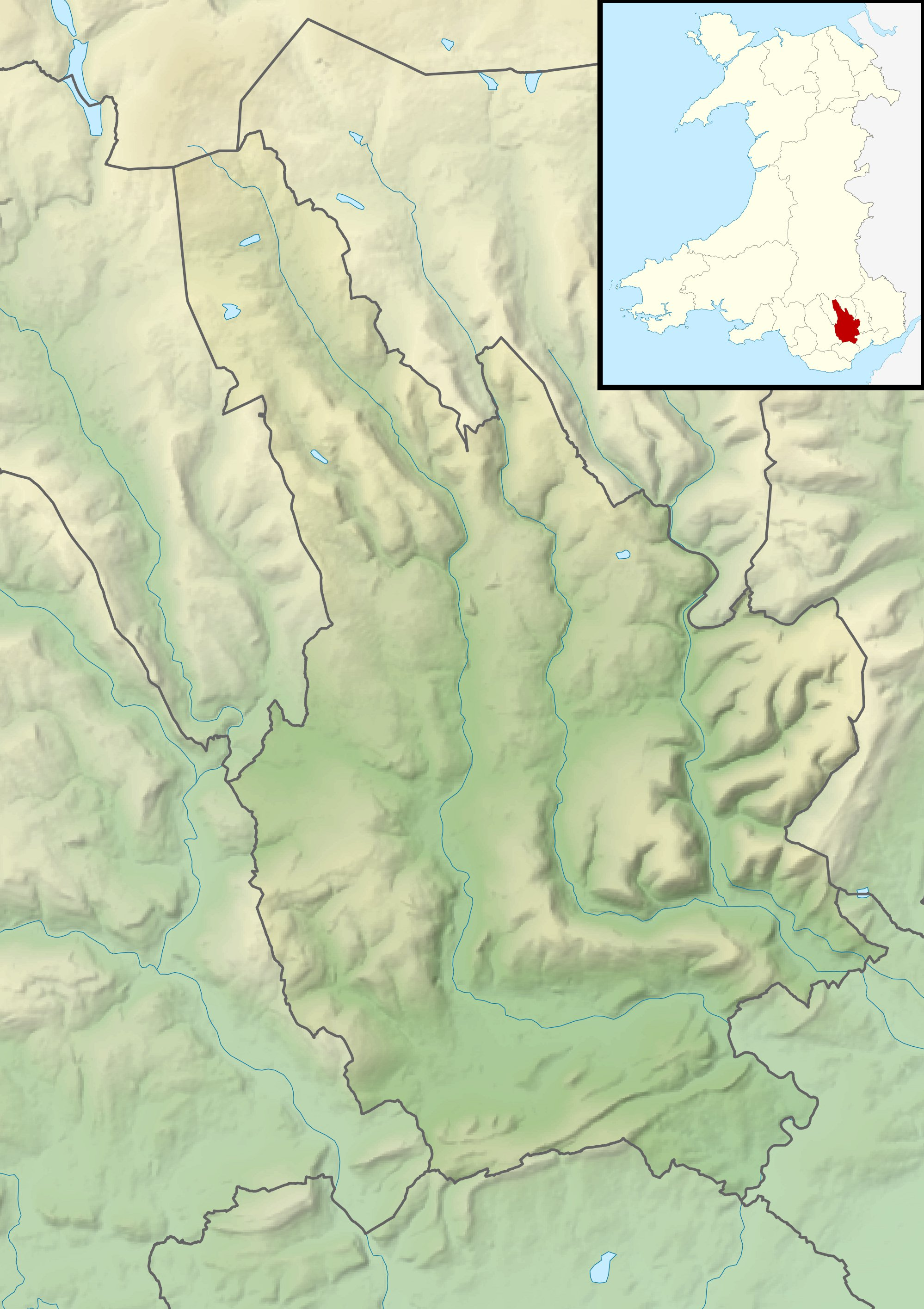
- Location within Caerphilly
- 51.6821°N 3.1958°W
- Type: House
- Location: Blackwood, Caerphilly, Wales

History
- Built: 1900-1907

Site notes
- Architect: Edward Prioleau Warren
- Architectural style: Tudorbethan
- Governing body: Hotel

Listed Building – Grade II
- Official name: Maes Manor Hotel
- Designated: 31 May 2002
- Reference no.: 26701

Listed Building – Grade II
- Official name: Former Coach House at Maes Manor
- Designated: 31 May 2002
- Reference no.: 26705

Listed Building – Grade II
- Official name: North Lodge at Maes Manor
- Designated: 31 May 2002
- Reference no.: 26708

Listed Building – Grade II
- Official name: South Lodge at Maes Manor
- Designated: 31 May 2002
- Reference no.: 26709

Cadw/ICOMOS Register of Parks and Gardens of Special Historic Interest in Wales
- Official name: Maes Manor Hotel Garden
- Designated: 1 February 2022
- Reference no.: PGW(Gm)54(CAE)
- Listing: Grade II

Maes Manor is a country house near Blackwood, Caerphilly, Wales. It dates mainly from the early 20th century and is notable for its gardens, designed by Thomas Mawson. Now a hotel, Maes Manor is a Grade II listed building and its gardens and grounds are listed on the Cadw/ICOMOS Register of Parks and Gardens of Special Historic Interest in Wales.

== History ==
The house, initially called Maesruddud, was built for Captain Edmund Williams, a local colliery owner and Sheriff of Monmouthshire between the early 1890s and around 1900. His architect was Edward Prioleau Warren, who studied under George Frederick Bodley. Warren worked on an earlier house which had stood since the 18th century. (Note: There is disagreement as to which member of the family was responsible for the reconstruction of the house in the late 19th/early 20th centuries. Cadw and the Royal Commission on the Ancient and Historical Monuments of Wales both attribute the first phase to Edmund Williams. However, Phil Jayne, a landscape officer at Caerphilly County Borough Council, in an article for the Welsh Historic Gardens Trust's Spring 2009 Bulletin, notes that Edmund died in 1895 and suggests that both the 1900 and the 1907 developments were commissioned by his nephew, Edmund William Tom Llewelyn Brewer-Williams.) In 1907 a major expansion was undertaken by Williams' heir, Edmund William Tom Llewelyn Brewer-Williams, who again engaged Warren to enlarge the house and employed Thomas Mawson to lay out an important garden. Mawson's comment on the gardens, "a jewel stuck into a lump of lead", reflected the garden's situation within the industrial Valleys landscape from which the Williams' wealth derived. (Note: The Williams family were originally local farmers whose estates in the 19th century were found to contain valuable deposits of coal. Their fortunes were further augmented through the marriage of Edmund Williams' daughter, Mary, to Thomas Llewellyn Brewer, heir to the Coalbrookvale ironworks.)

The Williams family left Maes in the 1930s and it subsequently served as a hospital and then a children's home. It now operates as a hotel, having had multiple owners throughout the 21st century.

== Architecture and description ==
Maes Manor is a Grade II listed building, and its gardens and grounds are listed, also at Grade II, on the Cadw/ICOMOS Register of Parks and Gardens of Special Historic Interest in Wales.

Mawson's garden is highly structural and contains a number of buildings to his designs. Many are themselves listed, all at Grade II, including: the North and South Lodges; the gates to the estate; the kitchen garden; the Upper and Lower terraces; and the coach house.
