= William Herbert (MP fl.1555) =

Member of the Parliament of England

William Herbert (by 1530 – 1567) was a Welsh gentleman and Member of Parliament.

He was the eldest son of Sir Walter Herbert of St Julian's, Monmouthshire. His father died in 1551 during his term of office as High Sheriff of Monmouthshire and William stepped in to complete the term. He inherited his father's estate at St Julian's, between Newport and Caerleon.

He was appointed dheriff of the county in his own right for 1552–53 and 1563–64 and elected member of parliament for Monmouthshire in 1555. He was also a justice of the peace for Monmouthshire from 1559 until his death in 1567.

He married twice: firstly he married Jane, the daughter and coheiress of Edward Gruffydd of Penrhyn, Caernarfonshire, with whom he had an only son, William and secondly he married a Dorothy. He was succeeded by his son William who was also to be a sheriff and MP.
