= Richard Mathias =

Liberal Party politician in the United Kingdom

Richard Mathias

Sir Richard Mathias, 1st Baronet (1 June 1863 – 26 October 1942) was a Liberal Party politician in the United Kingdom. He was elected at the December 1910 general election as member of parliament (MP) for Cheltenham, but was subsequently unseated on petition. His brother was the Liberal candidate at the resulting by-election in April 1911, but lost by four votes to the Conservative Party candidate, former MP Sir James Agg-Gardner.

He was knighted in 1913, and made a baronet in the 1917 Birthday Honours, of Vaendre Hall, Monmouthshire.

In 1918 he was made a Deputy Lieutenant of Monmouthshire and was Sheriff of Monmouthshire in 1923. He resigned his Deputy Lieutenant commission in 1938.

In 1922 he contested the general election as an Independent candidate for Merthyr losing to the Labour candidate in a 2-way contest.

General election 1922: Merthyr
Party	Candidate	Votes	%	±%
Labour	Richard Collingham Wallhead	17,516	53.0	+5.7
Independent	Sir Richard Mathias	15,552	47.0	n/a
Majority		1,964	6.0	11.4
Turnout			90.6	+
Labour gain from Liberal		Swing	n/a	

== See also ==
List of United Kingdom MPs with the shortest service

Parliament of the United Kingdom
Preceded by Vere Ponsonby, Viscount Duncannon	Member of Parliament for Cheltenham; December 1910–1911	Succeeded by Sir James Agg-Gardner
Baronetage of the United Kingdom
New creation	Baronet (of Vaendre Hall, Monmouthshire); 1917–1942	Succeeded by Richard Hughes Mathias
