= Tregeiriog House, Llanishen, Monmouthshire =

Tregeiriog House
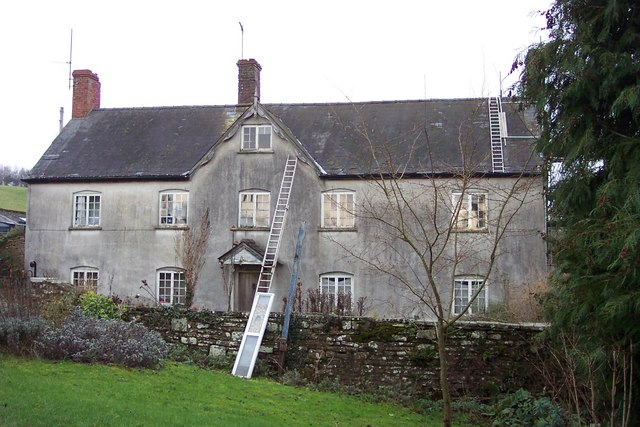
- "Graded II* for the special interest of its interiors, including the exceptional vaulted cellars."

- Location within Monmouthshire
- 51.7329°N 2.7901°W
- Type: House
- Location: Llanishen, Monmouthshire

History
- Built: C.16th-17th centuries

Site notes
- Architectural style: Vernacular
- Governing body: Privately owned

Listed Building – Grade II*
- Official name: Tregeiriog Farmhouse
- Designated: 26 March 1993
- Reference no.: 2885

Tregeiriog House, Llanishen, Monmouthshire is a farmhouse dating from the late 16th or early 17th centuries. Enlarged in the late 17th century, it was remodelled in the mid-18th century, when it was the home of the Duke of Beaufort's local agent. Still a private residence, it is a Grade II* listed building.

== History ==
The present house has origins in the late 16th or early 17th century, although there is evidence of earlier occupation. In 1749, the farm was owned by Daniel Tregose, Sheriff of Monmouthshire in 1756.

The architectural historian John Newman notes that the house was the home to the Duke of Beaufort's agent in the mid-18th century. By the 21st century the house was in a state of complete dilapidation, but a significant repair programme commenced in 2012. The cellars of the house are home to a colony of Lesser horseshoe bats and are designated a Site of Special Scientific Interest (SSSI).

== Architecture and description ==
John Newman considers the oldest part of the house to be the rear cross-wing. Cadw suggests that the five-bay frontage was added in the mid-18th century, intended to unify the appearance of the house. Newman calls it a, "typical 18th century manoeuvre". The interior was significantly remodelled at the same time, and Cadw considers that the extensive cellars were constructed during this remodelling.
