= Belle Vue Park =

Public park in Newport, Wales

- Parc Golygfa Braf
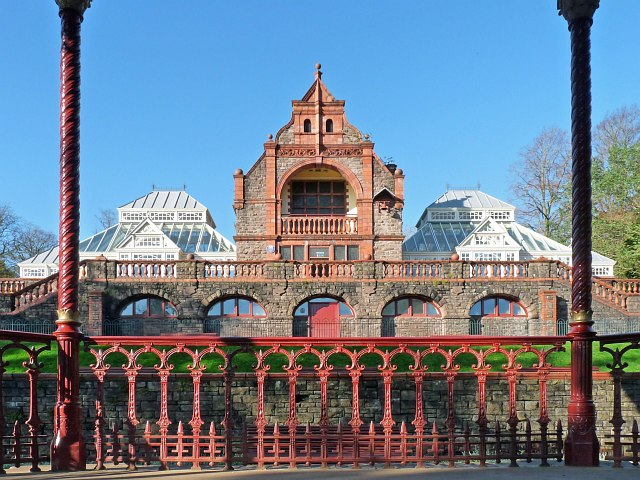
- Belle Vue Park and the 19th century Pavilion and Conservatories

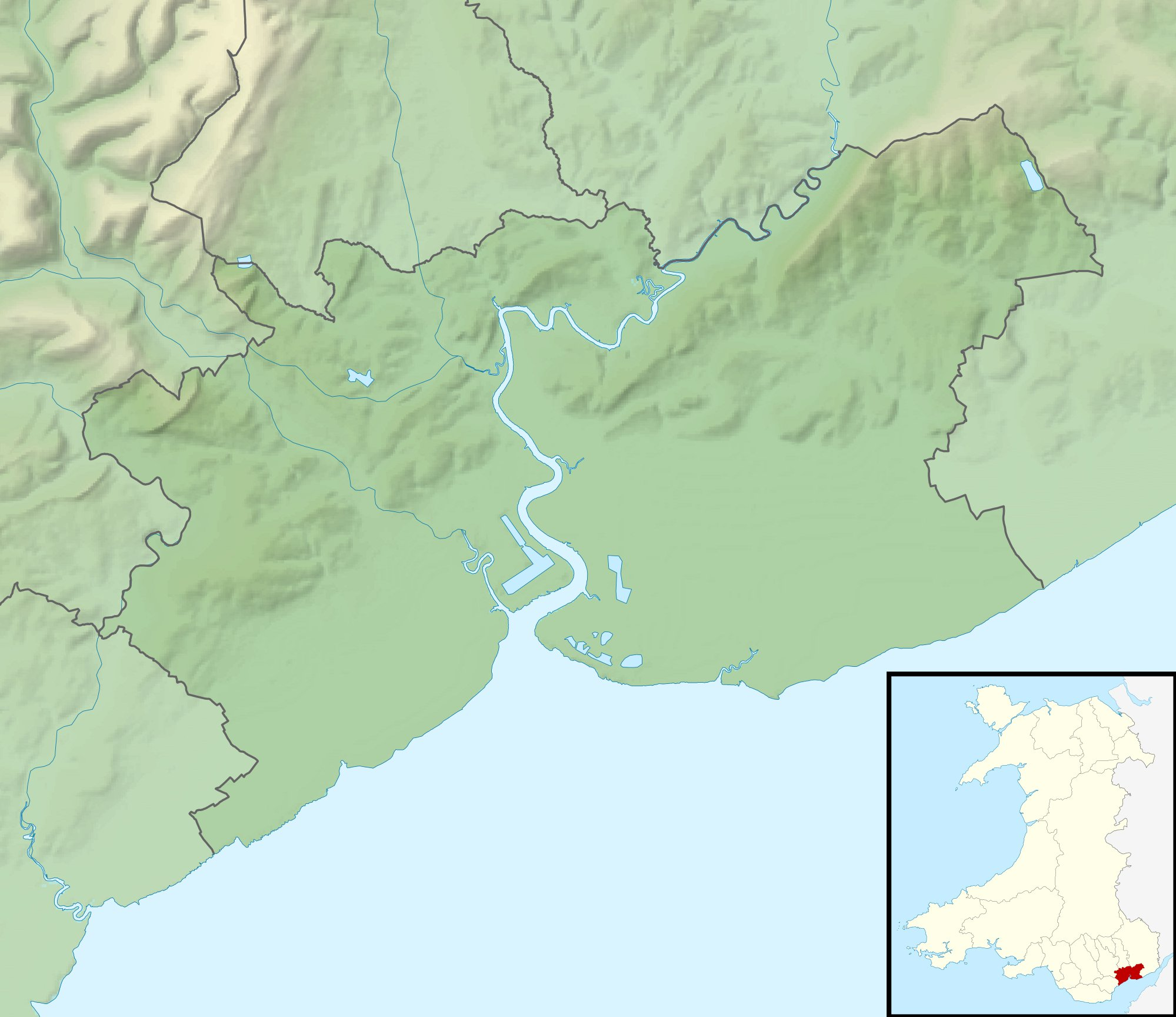
- Location within Newport
- Interactive map of Belle Vue Park
- Type: Victorian Ornamental Park
- Location: Newport, Wales
- OS grid: ST 30691 87162
- Coordinates: 51°34′45″N 3°00′06″W
- Opened: 1894
- Founder: Godfrey Morgan, 1st Viscount Tredegar
- Designer: Thomas Hayton Mawson
- Owner: Newport City Council
- Open: Variable
- Awards: Green Flag Award
- Terrain: Hill
- Water: Stream
- Parking: 6am and 4pm (pay and display)
- Public transit: Newport Bus: Belle Vue Park - X15, 30, 36, X5, 41, 2C, 34, 37, 50A

Belle Vue Park is a large Victorian public park in the west of the city of Newport, in South Wales. It was awarded a Green Flag Award in 2008 and has maintained the status for over a decade since. The park is listed on the Cadw/ICOMOS Register of Parks and Gardens of Special Historic Interest in Wales.

== History ==
The land on which the park stands was a gift to Newport from Godfrey Morgan, 1st Viscount Tredegar in 1891 to provide a public park for its citizens. An open competition to design and construct the park was won by the Lancashire landscape architect T. H. Mawson. Mawson's winning design was initially designed incorrectly for the neighbouring field, the site of the then Newport and Monmouthshire Hospital, after Mawson misunderstood directions on his first visit to Newport. The mistake was not realised until the first site visit, after the contract had been awarded. As a result, the designer had to promptly re-evaluate his plans for the present site. The park was Mawson's first win in an open competition. He went on to become one of the foremost landscape architects of his time, responsible for the design of many gardens in his adopted Lake District, including Holker Hall and Rydal Hall as well as Dyffryn Gardens near Cardiff. In November 1892 Lord Tredegar performed the ceremony of cutting the first sod; construction began and the park opened on 8 September 1894. The final cost of the park is recorded as £19,500.

== Features ==
Belle Vue Park has many features typical of a Victorian public park, including the conservatories and pavilion, bandstand and rockeries. Additional features were added to the park throughout the years. The Gorsedd Stone Circle was erected in 1896, for the National Eisteddfod, held in Belle Vue Park in 1897. The bowling greens were opened in 1904 and a Tea House added in 1910. The bandstand and original series of cascades were restored in 2006.

== Tearooms ==
Belle Vue Tearooms is a social enterprise café located near the Pavilion. It is run by Cotyledon BMCIC, a Machen-based community interest company who also operate rural markets across South East Wales, including a monthly food and craft market which is held on the first Sunday of every month. The tea rooms are open daily (including Christmas Day) from 9am to 4pm serving drinks and meals showcasing produce from the market traders. Weddings can be held at the conservatories and the bandstand; the function room can also be hired for parties, baby showers, meetings, birthdays etc. The café was initially refurbished and opened by the Malpas-based small business Parc Pantry, who handed back the premises to Newport City Council in 2018.

== Flora ==
Belle Vue Park contains a number of rare specimens. In early Spring the Himalayan Magnolias produce huge goblet-shaped pink flowers and the branches of the Judas Trees can be seen covered with clusters of rose-lilac flowers in May. In June and July the Tulip Tree produces its distinctive orange tulip-shaped flowers. Autumn brings glorious leaf colour to many of the trees and shrubs. Of particular note are the clear yellow leaves of Ginkgo biloba, one of only four deciduous conifers that can be seen growing in the British Isles today, and the glorious crimson leaves of the Liquidambar, a native of the eastern United States.

== Gallery ==
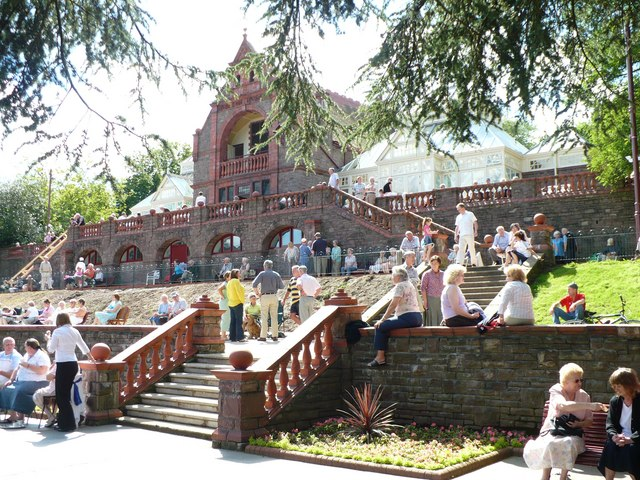
The Pavilion

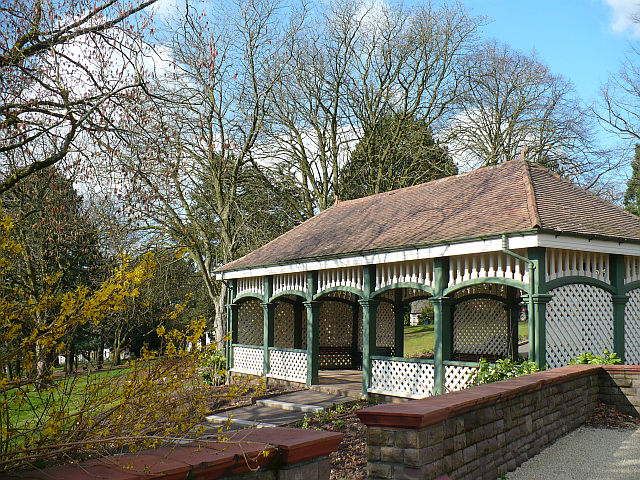
The Tea House

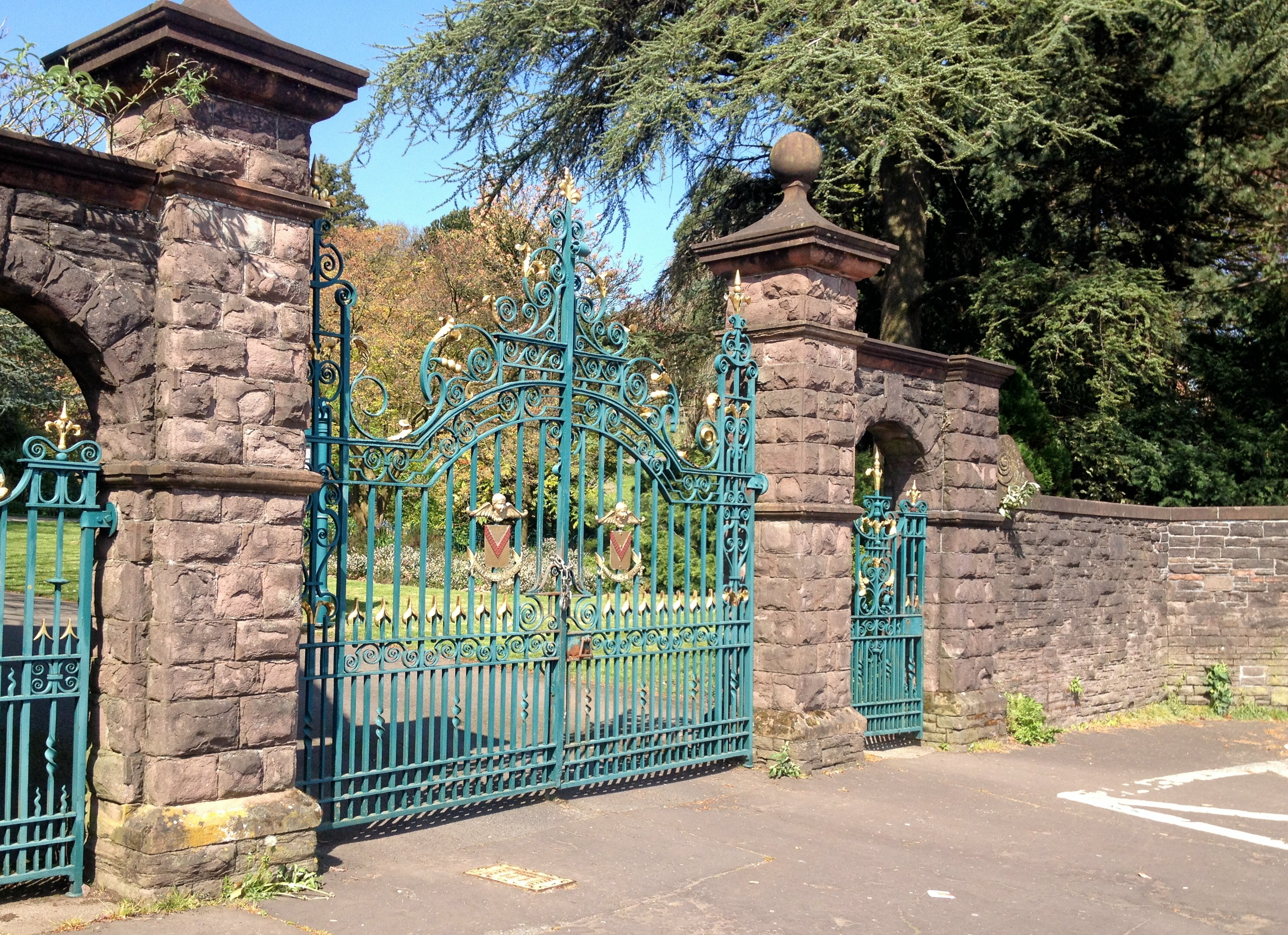
Belle Vue Park gates, Cardiff Road, Newport
