= Hanley Park =

Park in Stoke-on-Trent, UK

Coordinates: 53.015°N 2.176°W

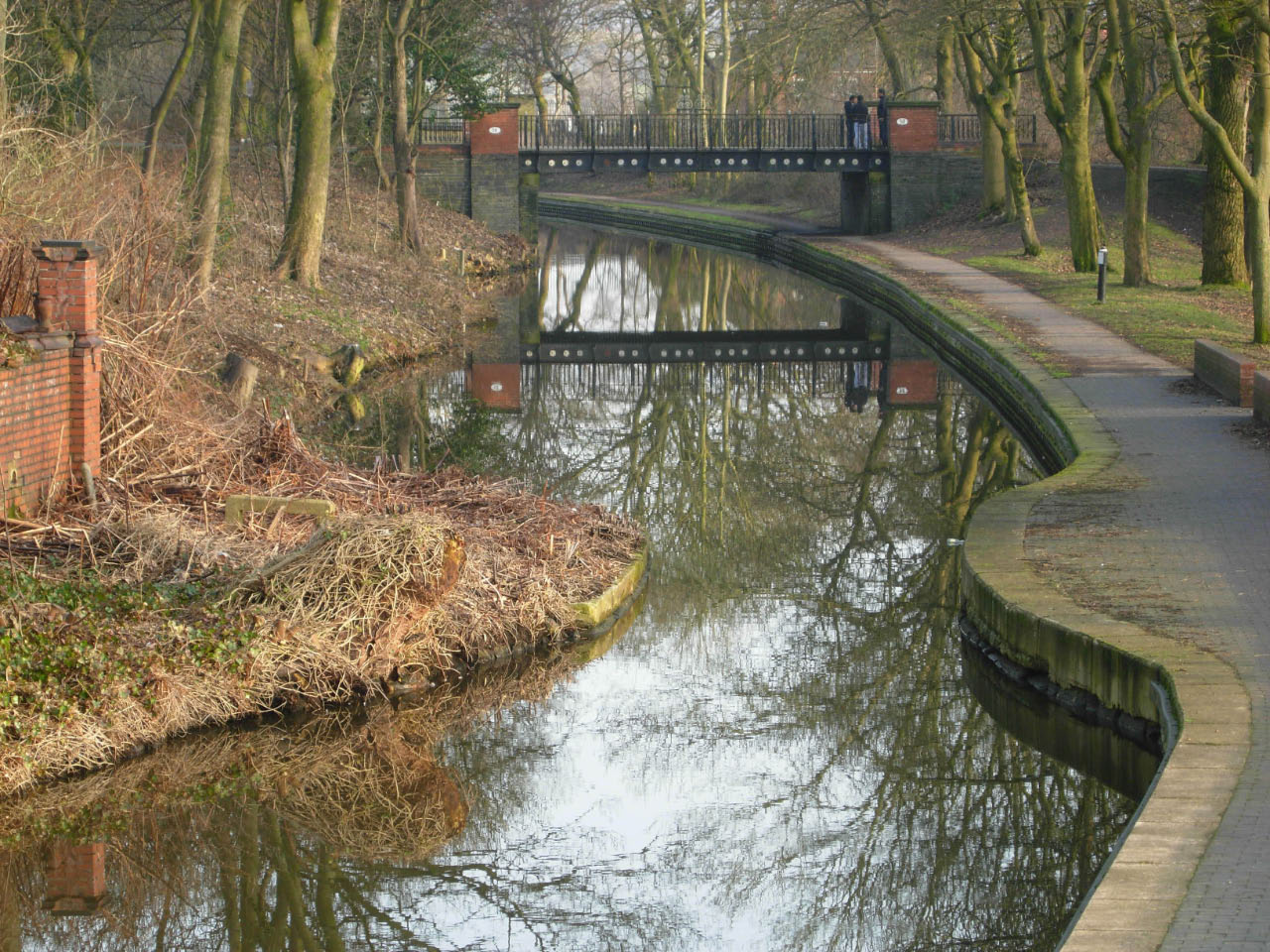
The Caldon Canal in Hanley Park with one of the footbridges

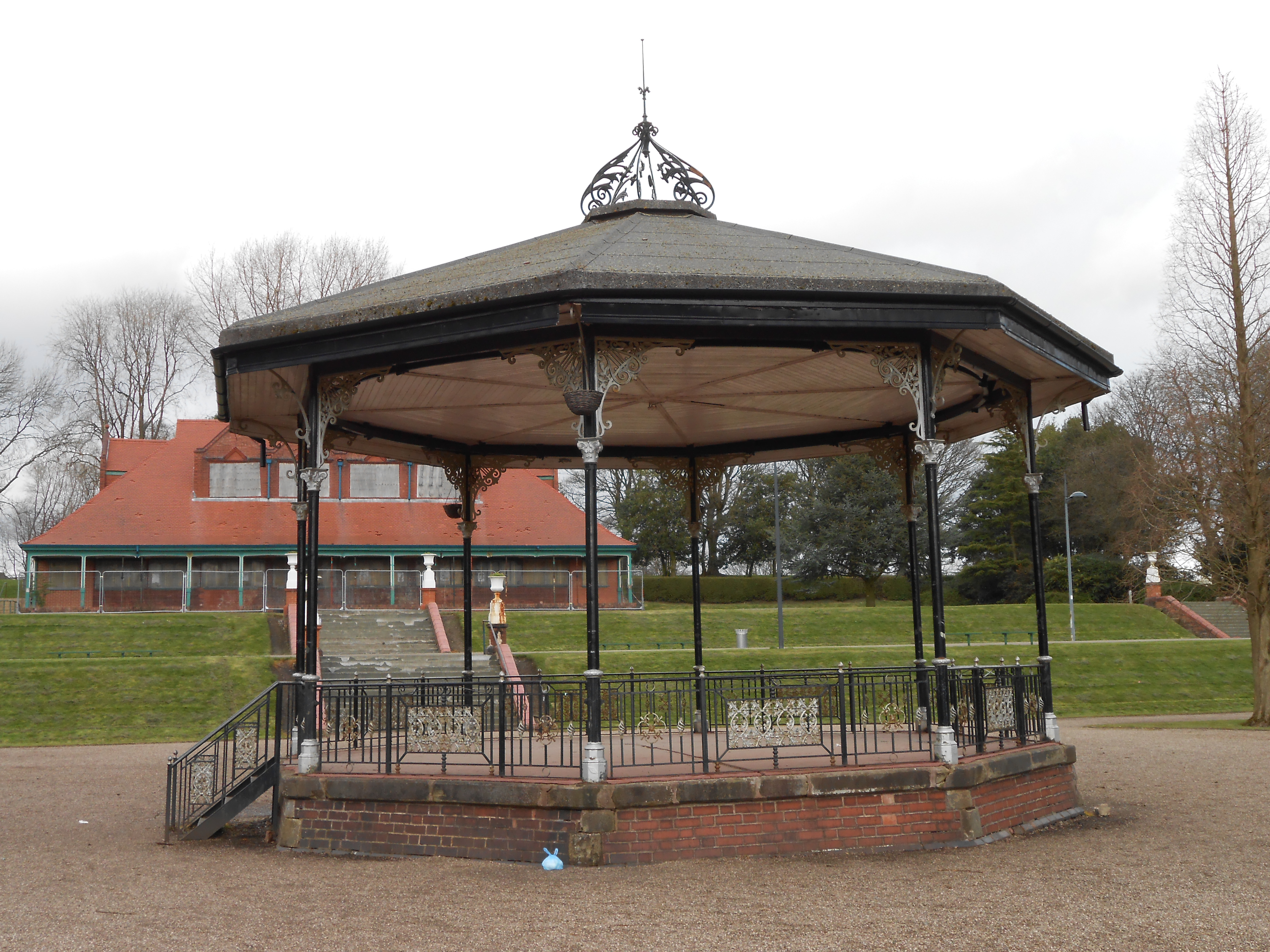
Bandstand with pavilion in the background

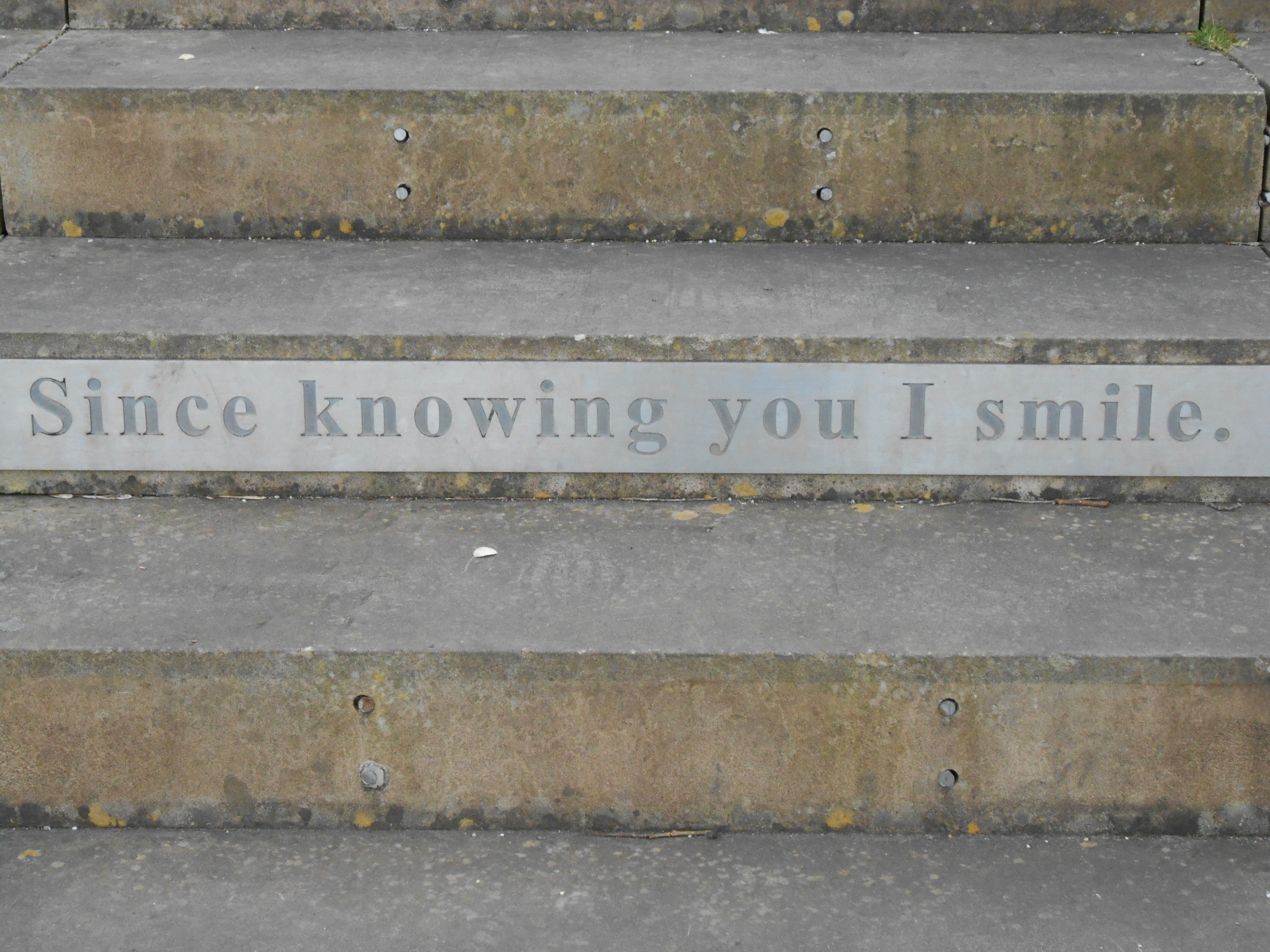
Steps with words

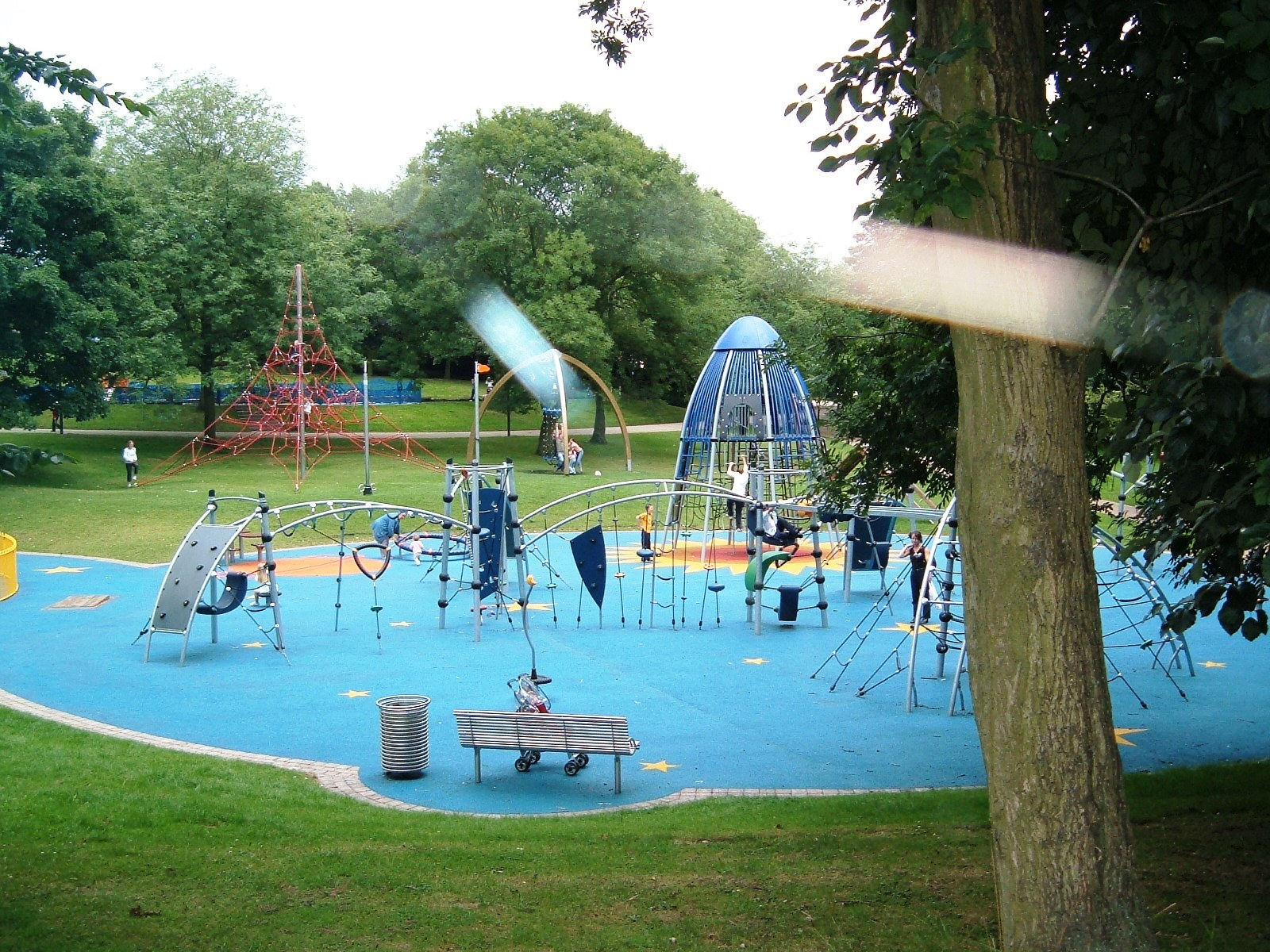
Children's play area

Hanley Park is an urban park in Stoke-on-Trent, England. Officially opened on 20 June 1897, it occupies about 63 acres (25 ha) of land. The park was developed by the town of Hanley over a period of five years and cost approximately £70,000. It has been described as a good example of a late Victorian municipal park, and is listed Grade II* in Historic England's Register of Parks and Gardens.

The park received a Green Flag Award in July 2023.

== Site ==
The area previously comprised a large waste ground called 'Stoke Fields', cut in two by the Caldon Canal. The land was purchased from the estate of Shelton Hall which stood a third of a mile to the north between Cemetery Road and Caledonian Road, and is now substantially outside the area of Hanley Park.

== Design of the park ==
The park was developed under the supervision of the landscape architect Thomas Hayton Mawson of Windermere, who created Burslem Park around the same time. Mawson's design makes use of terracotta to highlight features such as the axis between one of two footbridges across the canal and the pavilion. The pavilion, which is arguably the park's main focal point, was completed in 1896, and was designed by Mawson's junior partner Dan Gibson. The bandstand between the pavilion and the canal was the gift of Mr George Howson, a local pottery owner.

The southwest end of the park consists of a lake which is fed from the canal. Fishing is permitted. Next to the lake is a word sculpture that reads

'There are sounds all around, but nothing matters except the sound of your voice'

and

'I see you standing there as if on a distant horizon, I reach out and our hands touch'

Other facilities in the park include a basketball court, a football court and four children's play areas. At the western end of Hanley Park, adjacent to Stoke-on-Trent College, previously known as Cauldon College, there is the small 12-acre (4.9 ha) Cauldon Park.

The Hanley Park Fete was held from 1897 to 1939 and featured a funfair, side shows and a display of fireworks. The Potteries Central Horse Parade (open to anyone living within 10 miles of Hanley Town Hall) was also held annually (but it was never resumed after World War II).

== Restoration ==
In June 2015, it was announced that a £4.5 million Heritage Lottery Fund grant had been secured, which would allow for the restoration of the pavilion, boathouse, canal bridges, lake and fountains.

== Hanley parkrun ==
Hanley Park hosts a free, weekly, timed 5km parkrun every Saturday at 9 a.m. The first Hanley parkrun took place in September 2011.
