= Langdale Chase =

Coordinates: 54.406°N 2.946°W

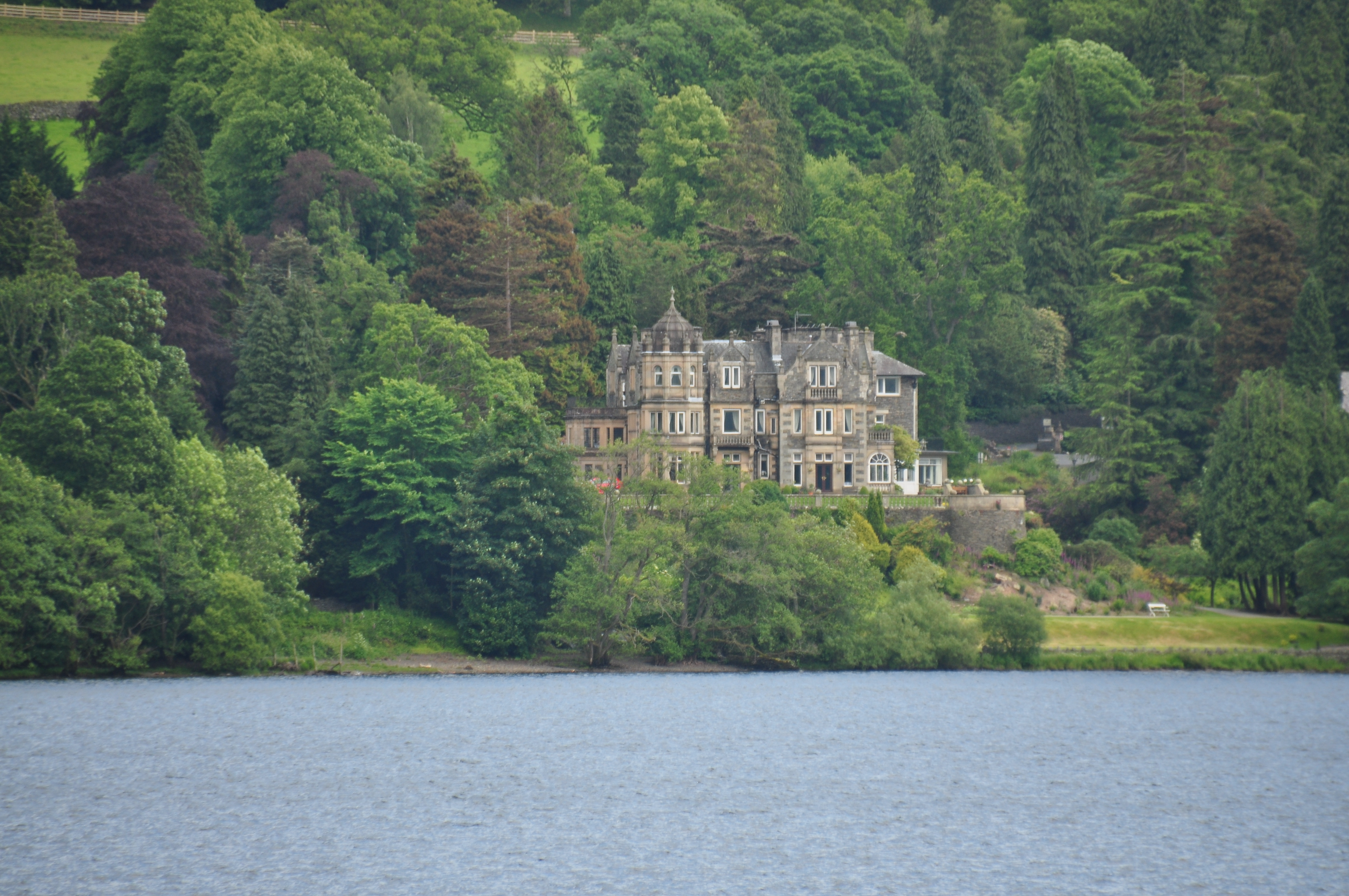
Langdale Chase

Langdale Chase, Windermere is a house of historical significance and is listed on the English Heritage Register. It consists of six acres of landscaped gardens sloping from the Langdale Chase Hotel to the shore of Windermere in Cumbria, in the Lake District of northwest England.

== History ==
The house was designed by J.L. Ball, J.T. Lee, and Pattinson of Manchester and built as a private house in the late 19th century for Edna Howarth, the wife of a wealthy Manchester businessman. The gardens were planned and laid out by Thomas Hayton Mawson, a landscape architect of international distinction, who was also responsible for the gardens at the Peace Palace in The Hague. Following the death of Edna Howarth the house was acquired by the Willows family in 1914 and it then came into the ownership of the Dalzell family in 1930: they converted it into a hotel.

== Mrs Edna Howarth ==
Edna Howarth (1848-1914) built Langdale Chase in 1891. She was born Edna Stopford in 1848 and was the daughter of Alfred Stopford who owned Stopford's Brewery Company in Manchester. In 1869 she married Thomas Howard Scott (1842-1875) of the firm Scott Brothers Wire Rope Works in Nutsford Vale. The couple had one child Lily Howard Scott (1870-1917) who later in life inherited a very large income. Thomas died in 1875 at the age of only 33 and Edna remarried in 1882 George Howarth (1846-1889) a businessman from Manchester. They lived at Heath House in Stretford. However he died in 1889 in Austria while they were touring the Continent.

Shortly before he died George bought the Langdale Chase estate with the intention of building a small house as a summer residence. However after his death Edna decided to build a much larger house which took three years to complete. In 1891 a newspaper gave a description of the house which was nearing completion. They said.

"When the grounds are planted and laid out there will probably be no prettier residence in the district. The house is built of two kinds of stone the dark blue stone of the district and a white freestone. Approaching the house the porch is a striking feature, adjoining which is a beautiful mullioned window, with stone panels, on which our artistic Manchester sculptor, Millson has carved the arms of various families. The hall itself is a charming part of the house. It is 21 feet in height, with a handsome carved oak staircase and galleries, and is lighted by the mullioned window already mentioned, filled with choicely designed stained glass, bearing heraldic devices. Off the main staircase is a flight of stairs leading to the Ladies' Bower, a pretty room over the porch. Further on is a winding staircase carrying the visitor to the billiard room. Still higher are the bedrooms and corridors, from which peeps of the hall may be obtained through charmingly designed arcades. The drawing room has a five-lighted bay window that runs up as a tower at the angle of the building. Indeed, each room has its peculiar charm. In connection with the work of erecting the house, an interesting ceremony was performed on Saturday last by the daughter of Mrs Howarth, who placed on the turret the finial stone of the tower. When entirely completed the house will form one of the most beautiful of residences in the Lake District."

Edna lived in the house with a staff of sixteen – eight indoor servants and eight caring for the gardens, carriages and boats. One of her helpers was Emma Bertha Jones (1865-1937), a maiden lady from Canada who lived there as her companion for 22 years. In her will Edna left Emma 750 pounds and her five diamond hoop rings. Edna’s daughter Lily married George Arthur Lorriman in 1891 and in 1892 they had a daughter named Lily Edna Lorriman (1892-1967). It was to her granddaughter that Edna left Langdale Chase when she died in 1914. Soon after her death the house was sold to the Willow family.

== Later owners ==
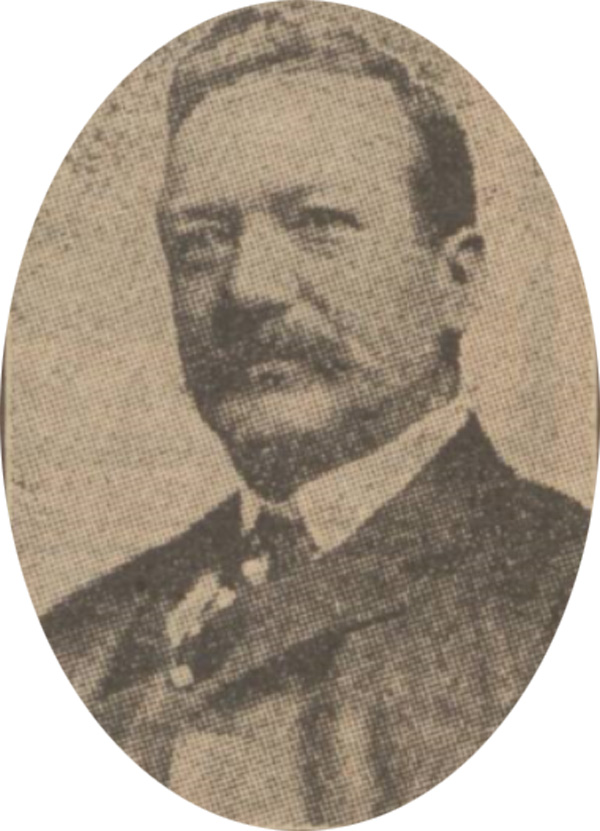
John Bouch Willows

John Bouch Willows (1850-1924) who bought the house was born in Kingston upon Hull in 1850. His father was John Green Wills Willows founder of the large seed oil manufacturers Messrs Willows Holt and Willows in Hull. John entered the family firm and later became a partner. When the firm merged in to British Oil and Cake Company he became a Director of this firm.

In 1878 he married Roberta Ann Dolphin Watts who was the daughter of John Edmund Watts, a lawyer from Edgbaston, Warwickshire. The couple had two children, a son and a daughter. The family lived in Hull for many years and then after John retired they moved to Scarborough. They then purchased Langdale Chase. He took a considerable interest in the fine arts and also music and drama.

He died in 1924 and his wife Roberta continued to live at the house until her death in 1929. It was sold soon after her death and bought by the Dalzell family.

Gertrude Annie Dalzell (1881-1954) and her daughter Dorothy Gertrude Dalzell (1907-1995) bought the house and converted it to a hotel. Gertrude was born Gertrude Annie Paitson in 1881. Her father was John Lawrence Paitson, a solicitor from Whitehaven. In 1904 she married Joseph Dalzell a director of several brewing companies. He died in 1913 at the age of only 39 leaving his wife Gertrude with two young children, a daughter and a son.

Her son John Lawrence Dalzell entered the army and by 1932 had been promoted to Lieutenant. Gertrude and her daughter Dorothy ran the Langdale Chase Hotel from 1930 until 1954 when Gertrude died. Dorothy then became the sole proprietor and operated the hotel until 1974. She then sold it to the Schaefer family, who ran it as a country house hotel until 2017 when it was acquired by Daniel Thwaites.
