= Cefn Ila =

Woodland in Monmouthshire, Wales

- Location within Monmouthshire
- Interactive map of Cefn Ila

Geography
- Location: Monmouthshire, Wales
- OS grid: SO359004
- Coordinates: 51.6995°N 2.9279°W
- Area: 83 acres (34 ha)

Administration
- Authority: Woodland Trust Wales

Cefn Ila (Welsh: Coed Cefn Ila) is an 83-acre (34 ha) woodland located in Llanbadoc, a mile away from Usk, Monmouthshire, Wales, owned and run by the Woodland Trust Wales (Coed Cadw). The estate is designated Grade II on the Cadw/ICOMOS Register of Parks and Gardens of Special Historic Interest in Wales.

== History ==
The estate was developed as a hunting lodge and then a medieval manor house with surrounding lands. Bought in the mid-Victorian era by Edward John Trelawny, a friend of notable poets Lord Byron and Percy Bysshe Shelley, he extensively redeveloped the gardens as then-modern pleasure gardens through extensive terracing. After his death, new owner Joseph Lister employed architect Alfred Waterhouse to rebuild the property as a picturesque large cottage manor house. After his death in 1885 in a riding accident on the estate, it was bought by Gustavus Ducarel, the 4th Marquis de la Pasture. His family had fled to England post the French Revolution, and although his father had by this time regained control of the family estate at Montreuil-sur-Mer, they lived mainly at the close-by Llandogo Priory.

After World War I, with the estate virtually abandoned by the now-again fully French-resident family, in 1925 the entire estate was annexed to Pontypool Hospital, and after redevelopment, it opened on 3 October 1925 as the "Kate Ayres Gustard Convalescent Home", providing care for up to 24 women and children. Used from September 1939 as a child evacuation centre in the phoney war leading up to World War II, it then became a war casualty convalescence unit. Post war, in 1947 it was reopened as a maternity hospital, with accommodation for up to 18 patients.

During the early hours of 14 September 1973, only two weeks after a fire inspection, a fire consumed the entire main property. As today, only the stable block survived (now home to a protected roost of bats), and the patients resultantly transferred to County Hospital in Griffithstown.

== Present ==
As the house and estate fell into ruin, the surrounding lands and resultant naturally developed wood were bought at auction in 2007 by Coed Cadw. The site is located a few miles away from Wentwood Forest, which is the largest ancient woodland site in Wales.

Since taking ownership, Coed Cadw has since planted an additional 36,000 broadleaf trees. The long term plan is to develop a mosaic of habitats, from grasslands through wildflower meadows to an arboretum, which will be a combination of the original Victorian planting, local heritage fruit trees, plus new broadleaf varieties. The wildlife within the parklands includes a maternity roost for bats, and habitats for a number of birds including Song Thrush and Marsh Tit. Today the site is a Cadw designated Historic Park and Garden, and a priority habitat under the United Kingdom Biodiversity Action Plan.

Coed Cadw is working with the Usk Rural Life Museum, to record and communicate the history of the site to visitors. In April 2014, the trust received a Heritage Lottery Fund grant of £297,700 to enable formal visitor groups and educational institutes to visit a fully restored walled garden and developed woodlands, together with associated visitor facilities.

Cefn Ila is designated Grade II on the Cadw/ICOMOS Register of Parks and Gardens of Special Historic Interest in Wales.
