= Matthew Herbert (died 1603) =

English politician

Matthew Herbert (by 1537 – 1603), of Coldbrook, Abergavenny, Monmouthshire, was a Welsh politician.

He was a Member (MP) of the Parliament of England for Monmouth Boroughs in 1558 and for Monmouthshire in 1563. He was a justice of the peace for Monmouthshire in 1575–1583 and from 1584 until he died. He was a receiver for the Duchy of Lancaster in Monmouth by 1580 until he died. He was Sheriff of Monmouthshire for the year 1583–84 and in 1594–95. He was the Deputy Lieutenant from October 1595.
