= Vaendre Hall =

Historic house in Cardiff

Coordinates: 51.5325°N 3.0911°W

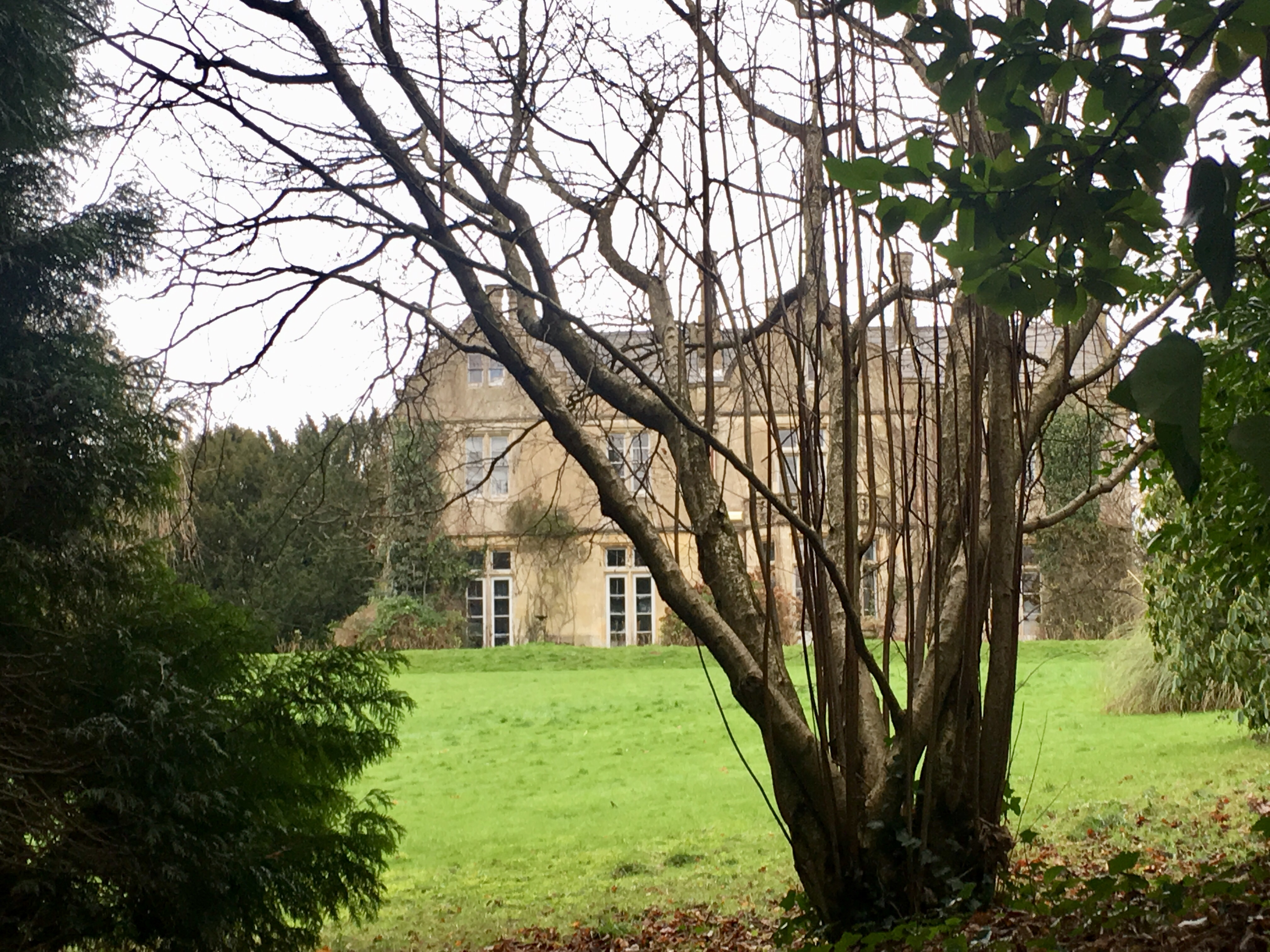
Faendre Hall, December 2020

Vaendre Hall (or Faendre Hall) is a large detached house in the Cardiff suburb of St Mellons.

Set in four acres (1.6 ha) of grounds, it is bordered on three sides by St Mellons golf course. It was developed by the shipowner and industrialist John Cory in the mid 19th century in the Jacobethan style after William Burn from a farm and renamed Faendre Hall. It was completed in 1850. Cory hosted the politicians Henry Labouchère and George Robinson, 1st Marquess of Ripon, the former Viceroy of India, on their visits to Cardiff and Newport in 1887 and 1888 respectively. It was subsequently owned by sportsman and brewer William Brain (of Brains Brewery), and Liberal Party politician Richard Mathias, who was appointed a baronet of Vaendre Hall in June 1917. The house has a separate stable and entrance lodge.

The hall and its 18 acres of land were sold for £7,000 at an auction in July 1893 to Dr. Hughes (equivalent to £950,000 in 2023). The farm adjoining the hall with two paddocks of land, a three stalled stable, wagon house, granary, two cattle sheds, poultry house, and a four roomed cottage was sold at the same sale for £1,150 to Mr. Richard Davies (equivalent to £160,000 in 2023).

Vaendre Hall was put on sale in 2013 and 2018 for £2 million; it was subsequently reduced in 2020 to £1.65 million. It was listed as having seven bedrooms and five reception rooms with a billiard hall.

Scenes from the 2014 Doctor Who Christmas special, Last Christmas, starring Peter Capaldi and Jenna Coleman, were filmed at the house.

The house has been listed Grade II since June 1977. In addition to the main hall the lodge and entrance gateway, the former stable block, and a circular garden seat in the grounds are all separately listed Grade II.

The GWR 4900 Class railway locomotive Faendre Hall was built in 1935 and named after the house.
