= Crossways =

Crossways may refer to:

== Places ==
=== Places ===
- Crossways, Dorset, England
- The Crossways, a 1908 historic two-storey house in Sydney, Australia

=== Structures ===
- Crossways (Aiken, South Carolina), listed on the U.S. National Register of Historic Places
- The Crossways, Toronto, a residential and commercial complex

== Art, entertainment, and media ==
- Crossways (Deathlands novel)

== See also ==
- Crossway (disambiguation)
