= Crossway, Monmouthshire =

Coordinates: 51.868333°N 2.801667°W

Crossways
- Entering Crossways from the south-west, Coedanghred Hill in the background

- Location within Monmouthshire
- Principal area: Monmouthshire
- Preserved county: Gwent
- Country: Wales
- Sovereign state: United Kingdom
- Police: Gwent
- Fire: South Wales
- Ambulance: Welsh
- UK Parliament: Monmouth

Crossway (the form used by the Ordnance Survey) or Crossways (the form preferred by most residents) is a hamlet near the village of Newcastle in north Monmouthshire, Wales. It lies on the B4347 road, just to the northeast of Hilston Park, about 1 mile (1.6 km) southwest of Skenfrith and about 7 miles (11 km) north west of Monmouth.

Welsh manuscripts mention Ty Gwyn at Crossways as a "slight building; a sort of hunting place, built with white rods". Ty Gwyn farm is now known for its Ty Gwyn cider, made since 1969 and marketed since 2007, and supplied to Waitrose and the Royal Opera House. Hilston Park lies just to the southwest of the hamlet.
