= Crossway (disambiguation) =

Crossway is a not-for-profit evangelical Christian publishing ministry.

Crossway may also refer to:

== Places ==
- Crossway, Herefordshire, England
- Crossway, Monmouthshire, Wales
- Crossway, Powys, a village in the community of Disserth and Trecoed, Wales
- Crossway Green, a village in Worcestershire, England

== Organizations and enterprises ==
- Crossway Baptist Church in Melbourne
- Crossway College in Queensland

== Companies and brands ==
- Irisbus Crossway

== See also ==
- Crossways (disambiguation)
