= Trivor Farmhouse, St Maughans =

Trivor Farmhouse
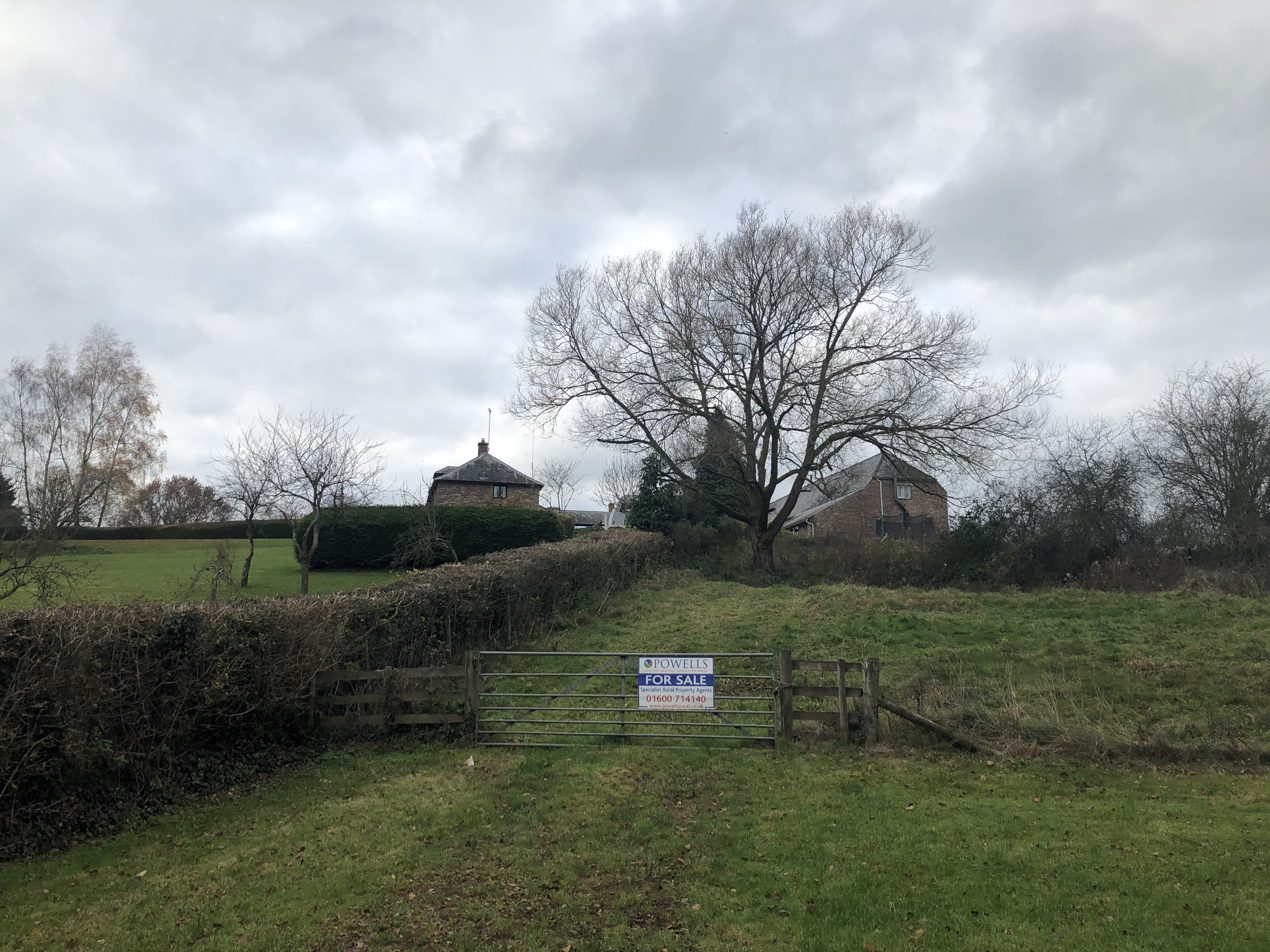
- "an important 17th century vernacular house of strong architectural character"

- Location within Monmouthshire
- 51.8556°N 2.7783°W
- Type: House
- Location: St Maughans, Monmouthshire

Site notes
- Architectural style: Vernacular
- Governing body: Privately owned

Listed Building – Grade II*
- Official name: Trivor Farmhouse
- Designated: 1 May 1952
- Reference no.: 2058

Trivor Farmhouse, St Maughans, Monmouthshire is a house dating from the late 17th century. Extended and reconstructed in the 18th century, it was originally the home of the recusant James family. In the 19th century it was bought by the Rolls family of the nearby Hendre estate. The house is Grade II* listed.

== History ==
The house was begun in the 1630s but remained incomplete until the very end of the 17th century. Sir Cyril Fox and Lord Raglan, in the last of their three-volume study Monmouthshire Houses, suggest that a lack of funds was the likely reason for the hiatus in building; noting that the "contemporary roof is of poor quality". The builders were the James family, notable Catholic adherents in a county with a strong recusant tradition. Trivor was a centre for Catholic gatherings in the 17th century, mass being celebrated in the attic of the house. The house was completed circa. 1700. In 1845, the farm was bought was the Rolls family and incorporated into their Hendre estate centred on Rockfield. Trivor was held by the family until 1922, when it was sold prior to the death of Lady Georgina Rolls in 1923, her three sons having predeceased her. The house remains a private residence.

== Architecture and description ==
Trivor is built of Old red sandstone and has two large chimney breasts with a dozen brick-built chimney stacks. It is constructed to an L-plan. It has a large and "highly unusual" stair turret which incorporates the porch. Fred Hando, the Monmouthshire writer and artist, recorded a visit to Trivor in the early 1950s. He notes the attic chapel is 22 feet long by 16 feet wide, and retains the niche in which a crucifix would have been placed. The architectural historian John Newman describes Trivor as "a tall and handsome farmhouse". It is a Grade II* listed structure, its listing record noting it as "an important 17th century vernacular house of strong architectural character".
