= Norton Court, Skenfrith =

Norton Court
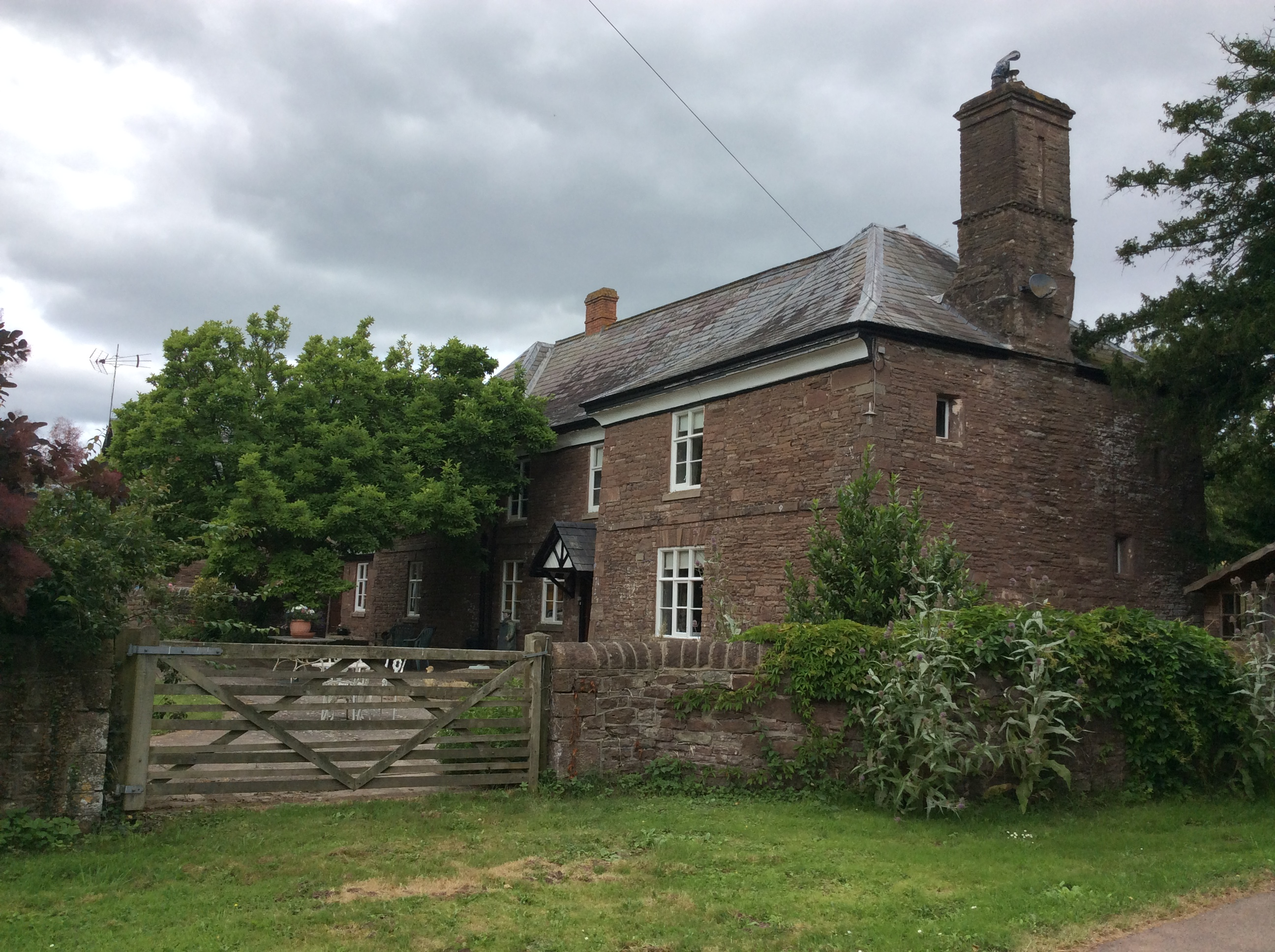
- "a substantial Monmouthshire vernacular house "

- Location within Monmouthshire
- 51.87761°N 2.80781°W
- Type: House
- Location: Skenfrith, Monmouthshire

History
- Built: c.1600

Site notes
- Architectural style: Vernacular
- Governing body: Privately owned

Listed Building – Grade II*
- Official name: Norton Court
- Designated: 19 March 2001
- Reference no.: 25046

Norton Court, Norton Brook, Skenfrith, Monmouthshire is a country house dating from c.1600. Its origins are older, beginning with its ownership by the monks of Grace Dieu Abbey, but the present building was constructed by the Walters of Grosmont at the beginning of the 17th century. It was extended and reconstructed in the 18th and 19th centuries. The court is a Grade II* listed building.

== History ==
The earliest recorded building on the site was a farmhouse, supporting the abbey at Grace Dieu. Following the Dissolution the house was granted to Sir Thomas Herbert of Wonastow Court. At this time, the court was constructed of timber but, c.1600, it was rebuilt and extended in stone by the Walter family of Grosmont. Further rebuilding took place in the 18th and 19th centuries and recent renovations have uncovered many earlier historical features.

== Architecture and description ==
The architectural historian John Newman describes the court as "a handsome early 18th century farmhouse", reflecting its later extensions. The house is constructed of Old Red Sandstone rubble and is of two storeys with a hipped roof. The south-east side supports "a massive side-wall chimney of stone". The house is a Grade II* listed building, its listing recording it as "a substantial Monmouthshire vernacular house".
