= Newcastle, Monmouthshire =

Coordinates: 51.8508°N 2.8016°W

Newcastle: Welsh: Castell-newydd
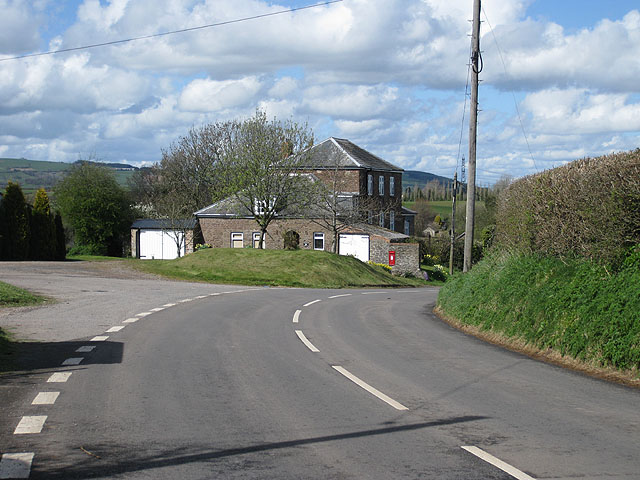
- The old schoolhouse at Newcastle

- Location within Monmouthshire
- OS grid reference: SO448173
- Community: Whitecastle
- Principal area: Monmouthshire
- Preserved county: Gwent
- Country: Wales
- Sovereign state: United Kingdom
- Post town: MONMOUTH
- Postcode district: NP25
- Dialling code: 01600
- Police: Gwent
- Fire: South Wales
- Ambulance: Welsh
- UK Parliament: Monmouth
- Senedd Cymru – Welsh Parliament: Monmouth

Newcastle (Welsh: Castell-newydd) is a small village in Monmouthshire, south east Wales, United Kingdom. It is located in quiet rolling countryside 6 miles (9.7 km) north west of Monmouth and 9 miles (14 km) east of Abergavenny, on the B4347 road, within the community of Whitecastle.

== History and amenities ==
Newcastle has a Norman motte-and-bailey castle site, from which it derives its name. Its history is obscure, but it is believed to have been founded by Hugh de Lacy, lord of Ewyas in the 12th century, and in the reign of Edward III it belonged to the Huntley family. The remains of the castle are on private land. The bailey is defended by a banked ditch, but the oval motte and surrounding wet ditch have been damaged by farm buildings. It commands extensive views to the west, towards the valley of the River Trothy.

Pool Farm, nearby, is described as "one of the most completely surviving cruck-trussed hall houses in the county", and is a Grade II listed building. About 1 mile (1.6 km) north of the village is the Victorian Palladian mansion of Hilston Park, now used as an outdoor education centre.

An ancient oak with a girth of 27 feet (8.2 m) grew in the village, there was a well which had a reputation for holiness and remnants of an ancient fort. Another botanical highlight in the village was a wisteria which was one of the oldest examples of this plant in Britain and grew on the inn in the village which was renamed as the "Wellington Arms" after the Battle of Waterloo in 1815 when the wisteria was 150 years old.
