= Lower Dyffryn House, Grosmont =

Lower Dyffryn House
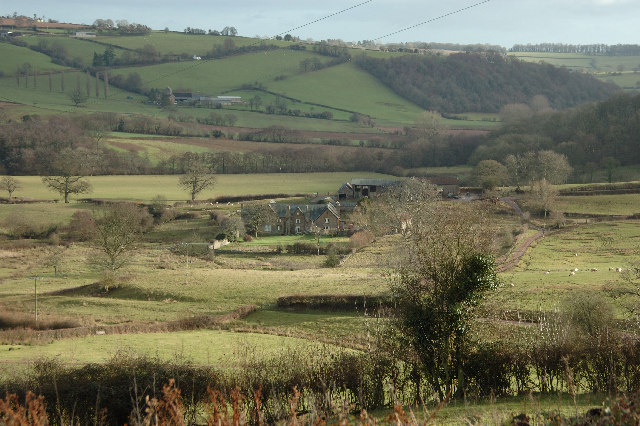
- "extraordinarily remote (and) melancholy"

- Location within Monmouthshire
- 51.9002°N 2.8223°W
- Type: House
- Location: Grosmont Monmouthshire

History
- Built: 16th & 17th centuries

Site notes
- Architectural style: Vernacular
- Governing body: Privately owned

Listed Building – Grade II*
- Official name: Lower Dyffryn House
- Designated: 9 January 1956
- Reference no.: 1950

Listed Building – Grade II
- Official name: Walls to Terraced Garden at Lower Dyffryn
- Designated: 19 October 2000
- Reference no.: 24154

Listed Building – Grade II
- Official name: Granary and Cider House at Lower Dyffryn
- Designated: 19 October 2000
- Reference no.: 24151

Listed Building – Grade II
- Official name: Hay Barn, attached Corn Barns, and Pigsty at Lower Dyffryn
- Designated: 19 October 2000
- Reference no.: 24152

Cadw/ICOMOS Register of Parks and Gardens of Special Historic Interest in Wales
- Official name: Lower Dyffryn
- Designated: 1 February 2022
- Reference no.: PGW(Gt)24(Mon)
- Listing: Grade II

Lower Dyffryn House, Grosmont, Monmouthshire is a farmhouse dating from the 16th century. Owned by a Sheriff of Monmouthshire in the early 1600s, it was rebuilt by the Cecil family in the mid-17th century as a substantial mansion to the typical Elizabethan e-plan. Its fortunes declined in the 19th century by which point it had been reduced to a farmhouse and much of its external and internal fittings were removed or replaced. The farmhouse is Grade II* listed and a number of the ancillary buildings have their own Grade II listings. The gardens, which are contemporaneous with the house, are included on the Cadw/ICOMOS Register of Parks and Gardens of Special Historic Interest in Wales.

== History and description ==
The farmhouse was constructed in the very late 16th century, Cadw recording that the owner was probably John Gainsford, who served as Sheriff in 1604. The oldest part of the building appears to date from 1590-1630. In the later 17th century, the house was extended as an E-plan mansion, by a cadet branch of the Cecils. The house was restored in the 19th century, although by this date its status had declined to that of a farmhouse. In the very early 20th century its wood panelling was removed to the nearby mansion, Hilston Park.

The architectural historian John Newman describes Lower Dyffryn as an "extraordinarily remote (and) melancholy" house. It is constructed of Old Red Sandstone rubble, of two storeys, with a two-storey porch. Newman also records details remaining of the 17th century setting, including a gazebo set in the wall of an enclosed garden.

The farmhouse remains in private ownership and is a Grade II* listed building. The garden walls have their own Grade II listing, as do the granary, the "quite grand" haybarn, and the shelter shed. The gardens themselves are listed at Grade II on the Cadw/ICOMOS Register of Parks and Gardens of Special Historic Interest in Wales.
