= Church of St Maughan, Llangattock Vibon Avel =

St Maughan's Church
- "a complete Perpendicular church"

- Location in Monmouthshire
- 51.8504°N 2.7837°W
- Location: St. Maughans, Monmouthshire
- Country: Wales
- Denomination: Church in Wales

History
- Status: Parish church
- Founded: C13th–C14th century

Architecture
- Functional status: Active
- Heritage designation: Grade II*
- Designated: 19 November 1953
- Architectural type: Perpendicular

Administration
- Diocese: Monmouth
- Archdeaconry: Monmouth
- Parish: St Maughans with Llangattock-vibon-Avel

Clergy
- Vicar: The Reverend G. J. R. Williams

The Church of St Maughan in St. Maughans, Monmouthshire, Wales, is a parish church with its origins in the 13th or 14th century. It was reconstructed in the mid 19th century by John Pollard Seddon for John Etherington Welch Rolls of The Hendre in 1865. It remains an active parish church and is a Grade II* listed building.

== History ==
The church dates from c. 1300, although there is some evidence of earlier work, including a 12th-century font. The church was reconstructed in the late 15th or early 16th century, and extensively rebuilt in 1865–1866. The architect was Seddon, and the patron John Rolls who had acquitted the patronage of the living at Llangattock Vibon Avel.

== Architecture and description ==
The architectural historian John Newman describes St Maughan's as "a complete Perpendicular church, at first sight". On closer inspection, the significant later alterations become obvious. The church is flanked by a farmhouse and barns in the tiny hamlet. Of old red sandstone, it has a combined nave and chancel, with a corresponding aisle and a tower, capped with a two-storeyed timber belfry which is entirely Seddon's work. The interior contains a "remarkable" timber arcade, which dates from the medieval re-modelling. On the south wall is a memorial plaque to General Sir Robert Brownrigg of nearby Hilston Park, a noted general in the Napoleonic Wars.
