= Hilston Park =

Grade II listed building in Skenfrith, UK

- Hilston House and Park

- Location within Monmouthshire

General information
- Type: Palladian mansion
- Location: Skenfrith, Monmouthshire, Wales
- Coordinates: 51°51′52″N 2°48′18″W
- Completed: 1838

Design and construction
- Designations: Grade II* listed / Cadw/ICOMOS Register of Parks and Gardens of Special Historic Interest in Wales

Hilston Park is a country house and estate between the villages of Newcastle and Skenfrith in Monmouthshire, Wales, close to the border with Herefordshire, England. The house and park are in the Monnow valley, beside the B4347 road, 7.9 miles (12.7 km) by road northwest of Monmouth and just over 1 mile (1.6 km) southwest of Skenfrith.

The Palladian mansion, built in 1838 for Bristolian banker George Cave, is a Grade II* listed building, the grounds and landscape park are registered on the Cadw/ICOMOS Register of Parks and Gardens of Special Historic Interest in Wales and the park's flower meadow is a Site of Special Scientific Interest. The park includes an early 20th century lodge at each of the two entrance gates; a ruined coach house; a lake, boathouse, and pond; several streams, gardens, and wooded areas; and Hilston Tower, a late 18th-century folly of red sandstone in the grounds's northeastern corner.

The house served as a residential outdoor education centre, operated by Gwent Outdoor Centres and supported by the local authorities of Newport, Torfaen, Blaenau Gwent and Monmouthshire until 2019. In 2020, the councils decided to consolidate their outdoor education facilities on a single site, and Hilston Park was deemed surplus to requirements. The house was sold at auction in 2021.

== History ==
Hilston House was for many years the principal estate and mansion in the parish of St. Maughans. In the 17th and 18th centuries it was the residence of the Needham family, although Henry Milbourne, an important 17th century magistrate of the county, is also reported to have lived here at one time. Sebastian Needham is said to have been buried at Skenfrith, on 26 March 1723, having fathered nine children. The house remained in the family, who were Catholic, for four generations. Following this stable period of ownership, accounting for about a century, the estate then changed hands a considerable number of times within the next 70 years. It was eventually sold by John Needham, a barrister of Gray's Inn, to Sir William Pilkington when Needham moved to Somerset. Pilkington sold it to James Jones of the Graig, who sold it to Sir Robert Brownrigg, G.C.B. a distinguished officer in the Peninsular War. He died on 27 May 1833, aged 76 years and his monument may be seen on the south wall of St. Maughan's Church. After his death the house was sold to Thomas Coates of Lancashire. Shortly afterwards, on 12 September 1838, the house was destroyed by fire.

It was then sold to George Cave, a banker of Bristol, who was responsible for building a new Palladian mansion which remains today. He sold it to Alfred Crawshay, who sold it to John Hamilton who finally completed the building. His only son, Captain Pryce Bowman Hamilton, brother to Alice Mary Sinclair, seems to have added considerably to the Hilston Estate and it appears that he also purchased Norton Court, Skenfrith from Henry Somerset, 8th Duke of Beaufort, and bought Skenfrith Mill and Lower Dyffryn House, Grosmont around 1870.

Pryce Hamilton sold Hilston House in about 1873 to James Graham, High Sheriff of Monmouthshire in 1881, who passed the house on to Douglas William Graham, who was living at Hilston in 1902, when the hall was panelled with the oak from the hall of the Lower Duffryn. Graham was also responsible for other improvements, the stone and brick buildings at Home Farm, the Lodges, New Cottages and the reservoir. It was then owned for some time by the Lawley family, who had made their fortune in shipping and cotton in Manchester. In the 1930s, Hilston Park was the residence of Edmund Henry Bevan (High Sheriff of Northamptonshire in 1912), whose riches were by inheritance from the Portland cement made at Bevan's Works in Northfleet, Kent. He married Joan Mary Conyers Norton, the eldest daughter of the 5th Baron Grantley, in the 1930s.

It was purchased by T. E. Davies in the 1940s, who sold the house and estate on 17 October 1947. In the 1950s, the house was converted to a school. It became an outdoor education centre in 1971. It continued as a residential centre, operated since 1996 by Gwent Outdoor Education Service, a joint service supported by the four local authorities of Blaenau Gwent, Monmouthshire, Newport and Torfaen until 2019. In 2020, cost pressures led the councils to decide to consolidate their outward bound activities at a single site near Cwmbran, and Hilston Park was deemed surplus to requirements. It was sold at auction in March 2021.

== Architecture and layout ==
=== Grounds ===
==== Gardens and lodges ====
Hilston House, which is situated in the western half of the park, has two entrances. The south drive "skirts the forecourt to the N and sweeps round southwards past the lake and straight to the B4347", and the main drive in tarmac, from the northwest, "drive winds through a wooded area to a level forecourt of grass with a rectangular tarmac area in front of the main entrance to the house." Two early 20th century lodges are contained on the estate, one at the northern end of the front drive and the other to the south, on the B4347. One of these, Lower Dyffryn, is an E-shaped building of Early Tudor style, with a slate roof, three gables, and a projecting chimney-breast. The coach-house on the northeastern side of the drive was largely demolished in 1972; all that remains is its rear and side walls.

In the early 1920s, the estate was described as being 1,050 acres (420 ha), and that there were 6 miles (9.7 km) of fishing along the River Monnow. The park's flower meadow is a Site of Special Scientific Interest. Cadw cites the reason for it being listed as an SSSI in 1990 as "19th-century park and garden, with some well preserved features, including ornamental lake and folly tower". Much of the park is under agricultural cultivation, and several streams arising from springs, mainly in the western side of the park flow through and enter the River Monnow. To the southeast of the house is an Italian rose garden which contains a circular stone pool and fountain. To the northeast of the house is a large walled kitchen garden, rectangular in shape, and framed by red brick walls, mostly 3 metres (9.8 ft) in height, but 2.2 metres (7 ft 3 in) on the eastern side and 2 metres (6 ft 7 in) to the east of the door on the southern side. The kitchen garden is orientated in a southwest–northeast direction, with a buttressed northern wall, two entrances on the western side, and one on each of the northern, eastern and southern walls. In the summer months it is used as a caravan park. The area to the north of the kitchen garden contains mainly ruined sheds and glasshouses and was wildly overgrown at the time of its surveying in December 1990. The gardens and pleasure grounds surrounding the house, and the wider landscape park, are designated Grade II on the Cadw/ICOMOS Register of Parks and Gardens of Special Historic Interest in Wales.

==== Lake ====
A lake and silted artificial pond is situated to the southwest of the house, separated by a belt of woodland consisting of mainly deciduous, coniferous trees and shrubs, and also pines, cypresses, monkey puzzle trees, copper beeches, yews and laurel trees. The lake, roughly 100 metres (330 ft) at longest from north to south and roughly 60 metres (200 ft) at its widest point, is cited by Cadw to be "fed by a spring at its [north] end, and dammed at its [south] end by a massive earthen dam across the valley floor." The lake contains a "kidney-shaped island", framed by a sloping stone revetment wall, and a similar smaller island nearer the eastern shore. On the eastern side of the lake is a boathouse and grotto. The grotto is situated in the middle of a revetment wall of about 2 metres high built of large irregularly placed stones, and is characterised as a semi-circular alcove, 1.8 metres (5 ft 11 in) in height, 2.5 metres (8 ft 2 in) in depth and 1.2 metres (3 ft 11 in) in width.

==== Hilston Tower ====
There is also a woodland, a former Forestry Commission plantation, planted around 1960 in the north-eastern corner of the park on a small hill, which contains a circular folly tower, of three storeys, in the centre. The tower, built from red sandstone, is believed to date to the late 18th century. The northern side is considerably more eroded by the weather than the southern side. The tower is marginally wider at the base and has no internal floor structure, but contains holes for floor joists and stair treads. There are four windows on the ground floors and narrower windows higher up.

=== House ===
Much work was done on the house in the expectation of a visit by George IV, which never happened. The main building has been described as "a major early Victorian stuccoed classical mansion, about which little is known". The two-storeyed north front features nine bays, the outermost ones slightly recessed, with a central pedimented porte-cochère of four massive Ionic columns. The southeast front has a single-storey portico running the length of the front, which leads to a conservatory at the northeast end of the house. The architect is not known. The building was extended on its eastern side and its interior remodelled, around 1912, when a large ballroom in the Arts and Crafts style, designed by Arthur Grove was added. This features elaborate plasterwork and decoration in the form of signs of the zodiac. It became a Grade II* listed building on 5 January 1952.
