= The Crossways =

Coordinates: 33.9008°S 151.2236°E

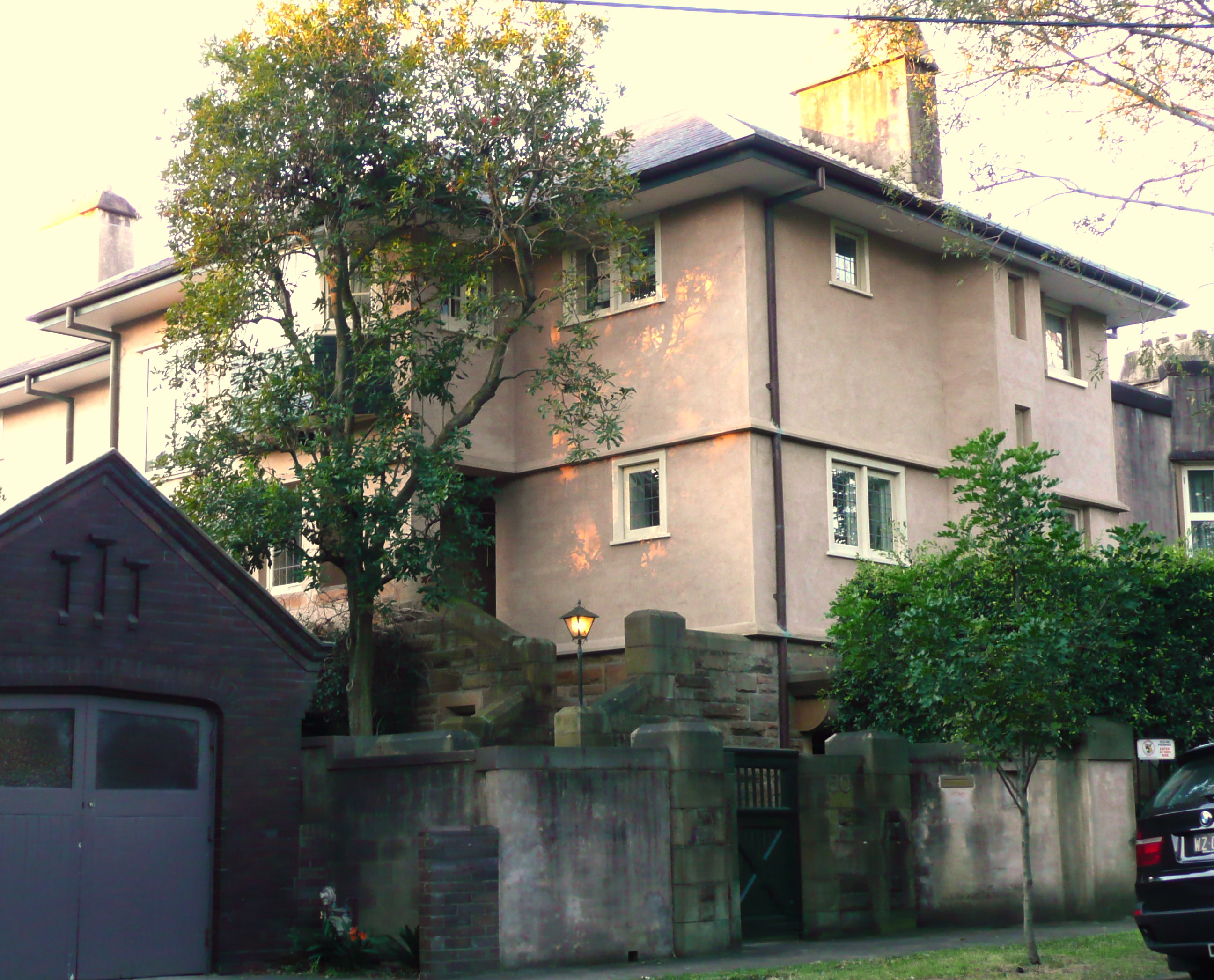

The Crossways is a historic two-storey house in the suburb of Centennial Park in Sydney, New South Wales, Australia. It built in 1908 and designed by Waterhouse and Lake.

== History and description ==
Listed on the NSW State Heritage Register, The Crossways is described as "...one of the finest examples of the Federation Arts and Crafts style in Australia, and one of the finest works of architect B.J.Waterhouse ... also historically significant as the residence of Dr Craig Gordon, physician and surgeon." It includes recognisable Arts and Crafts elements such as the roughcast walls and irregular windows, but its style is broad and there is even a castellated section of wall at the side. Major alterations were carried out in the 1990s by Espie Dods.

== Gallery ==
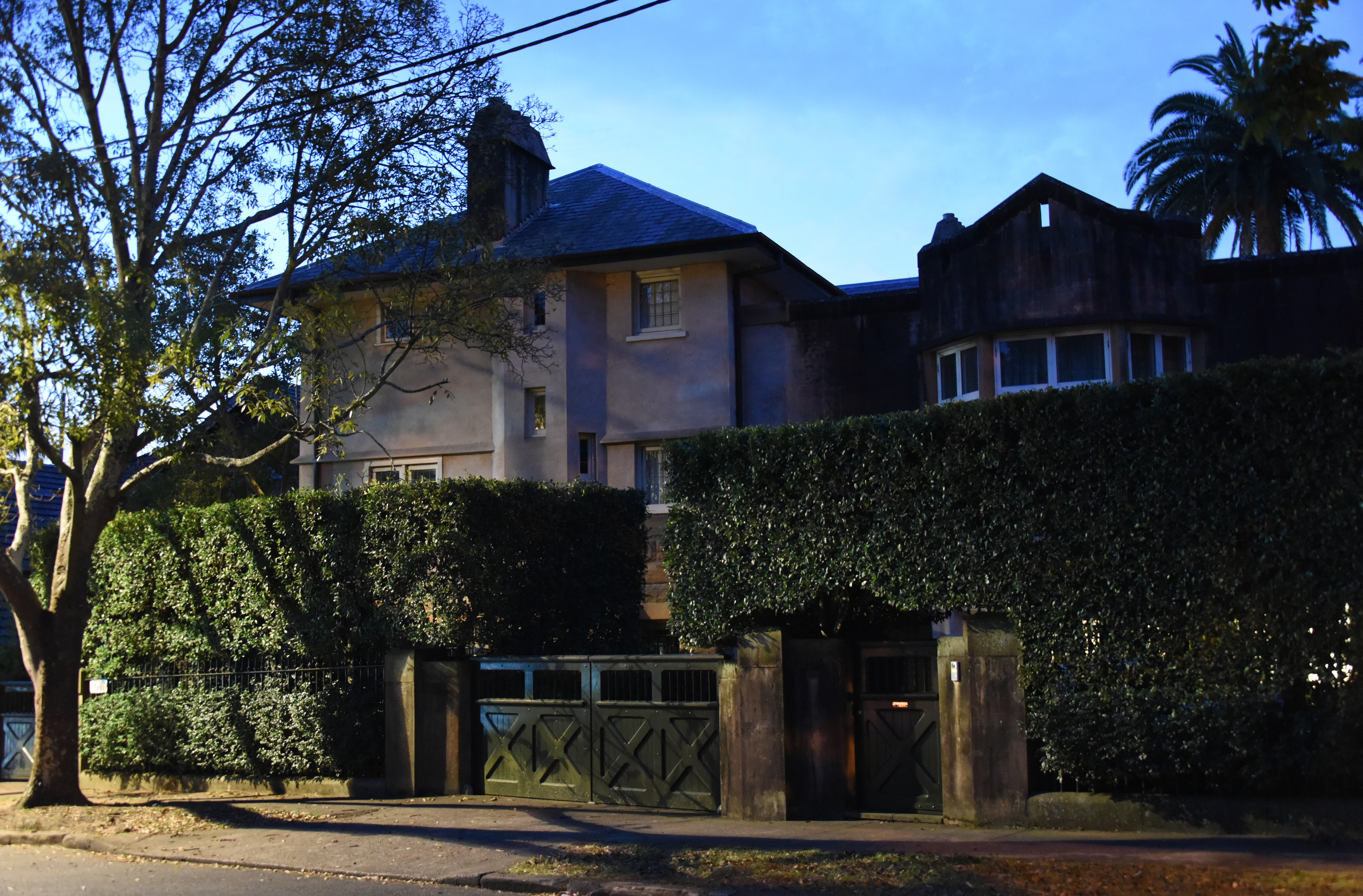

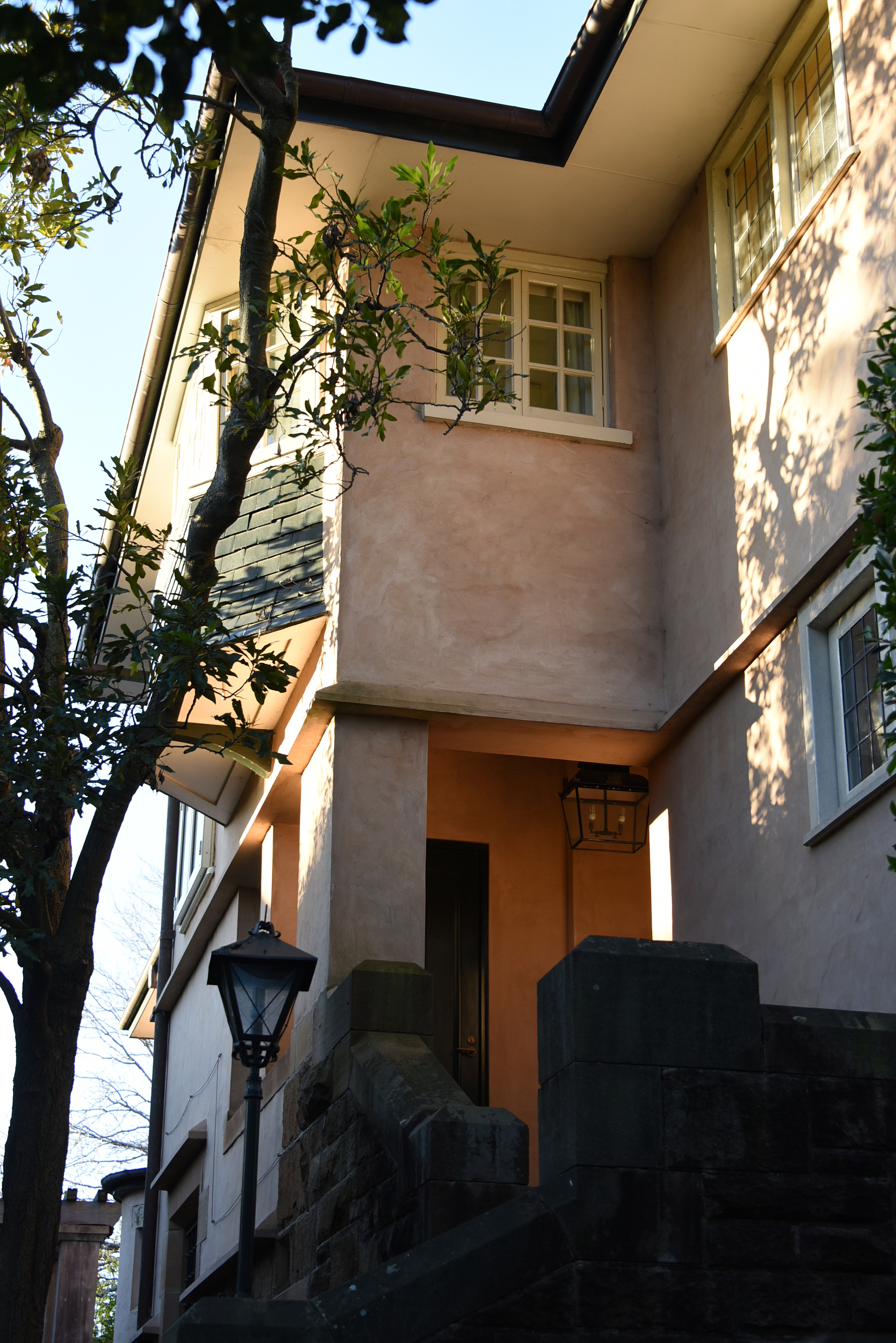

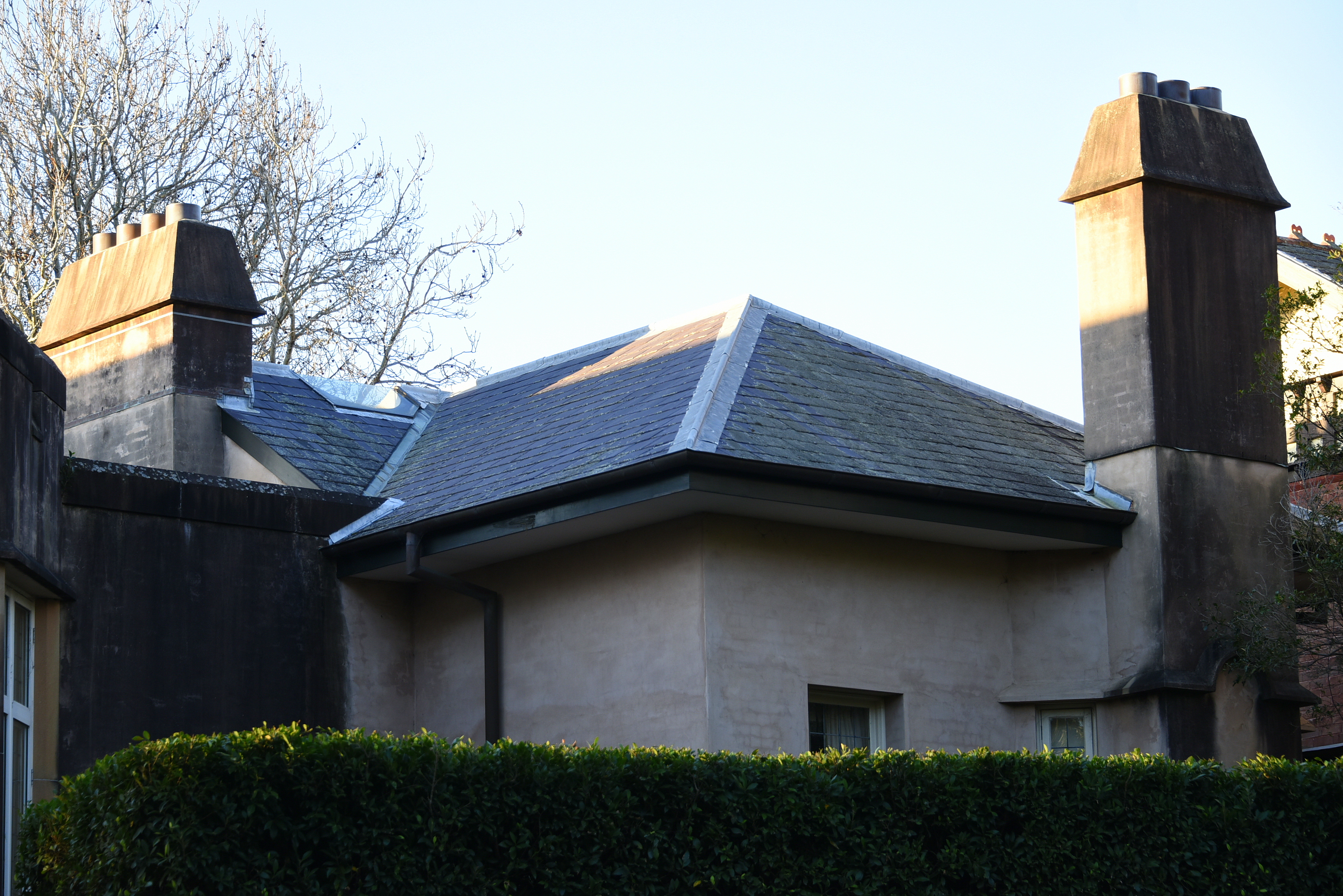

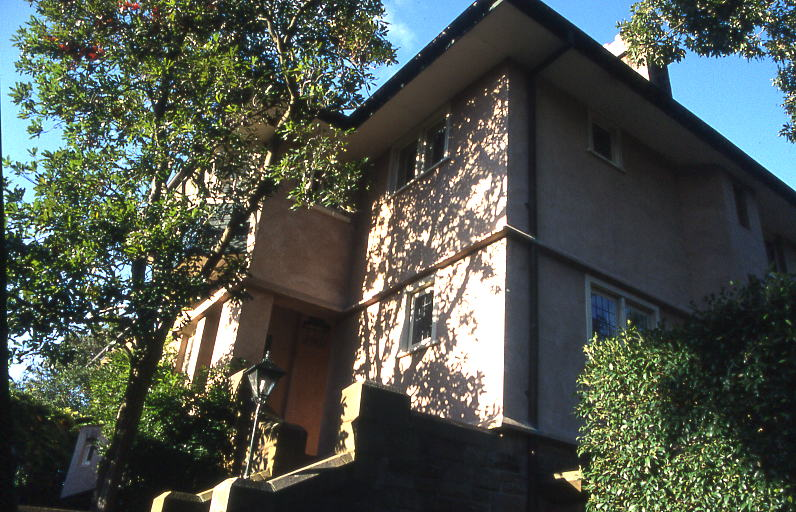

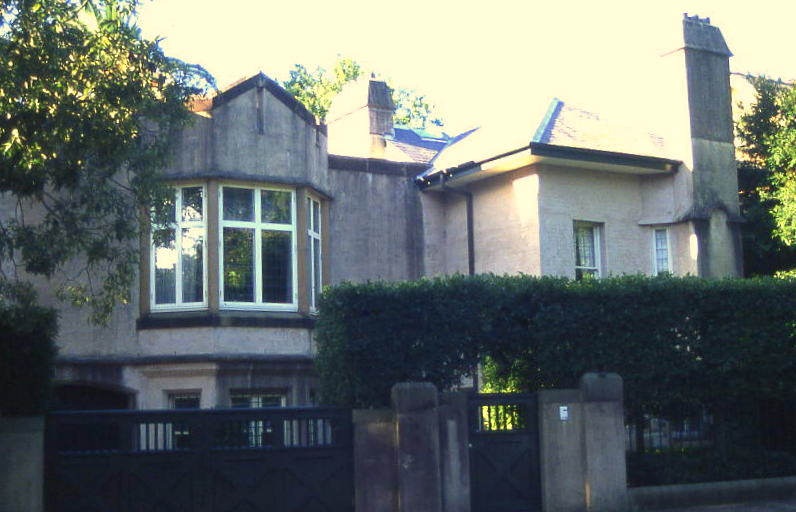

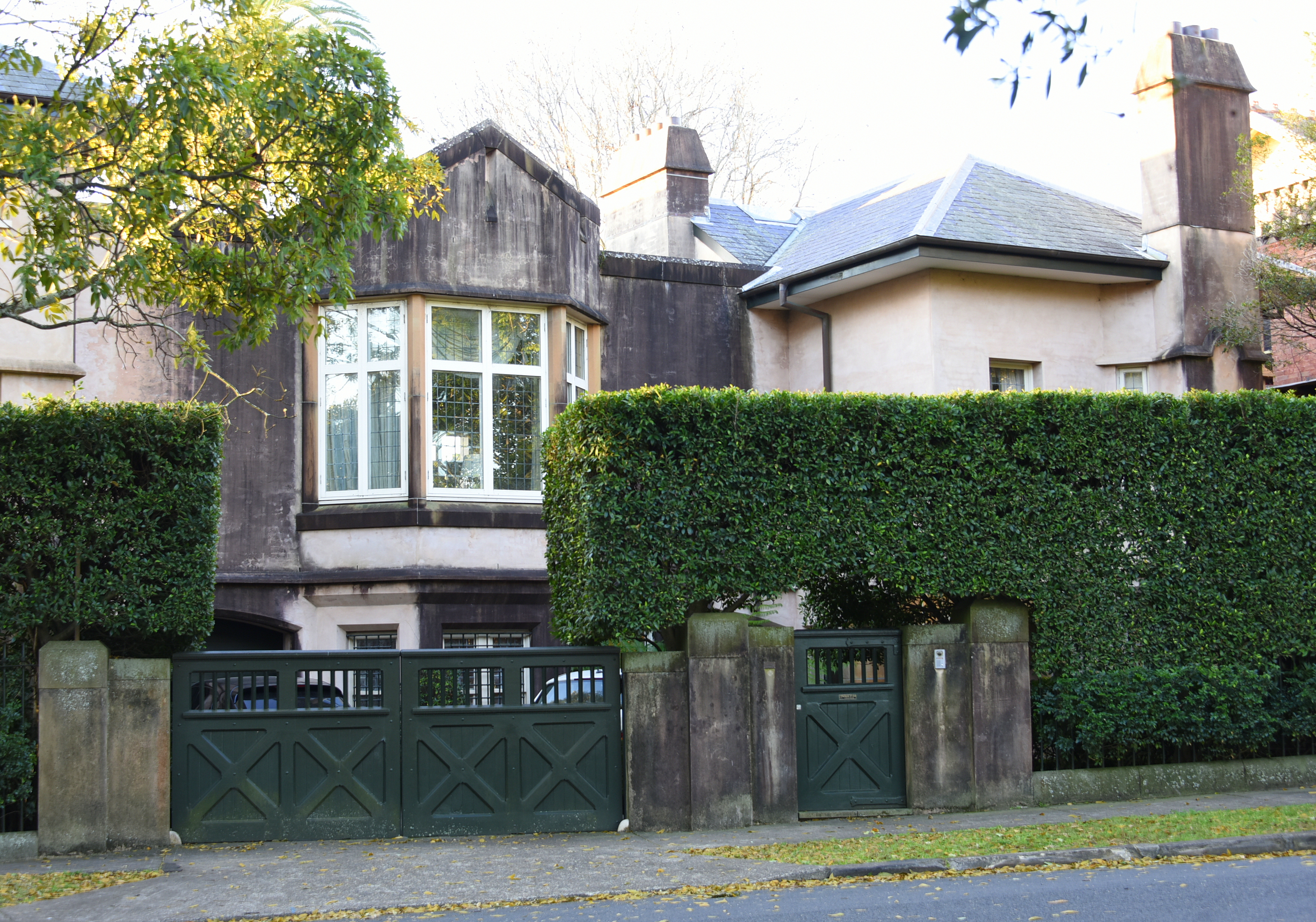

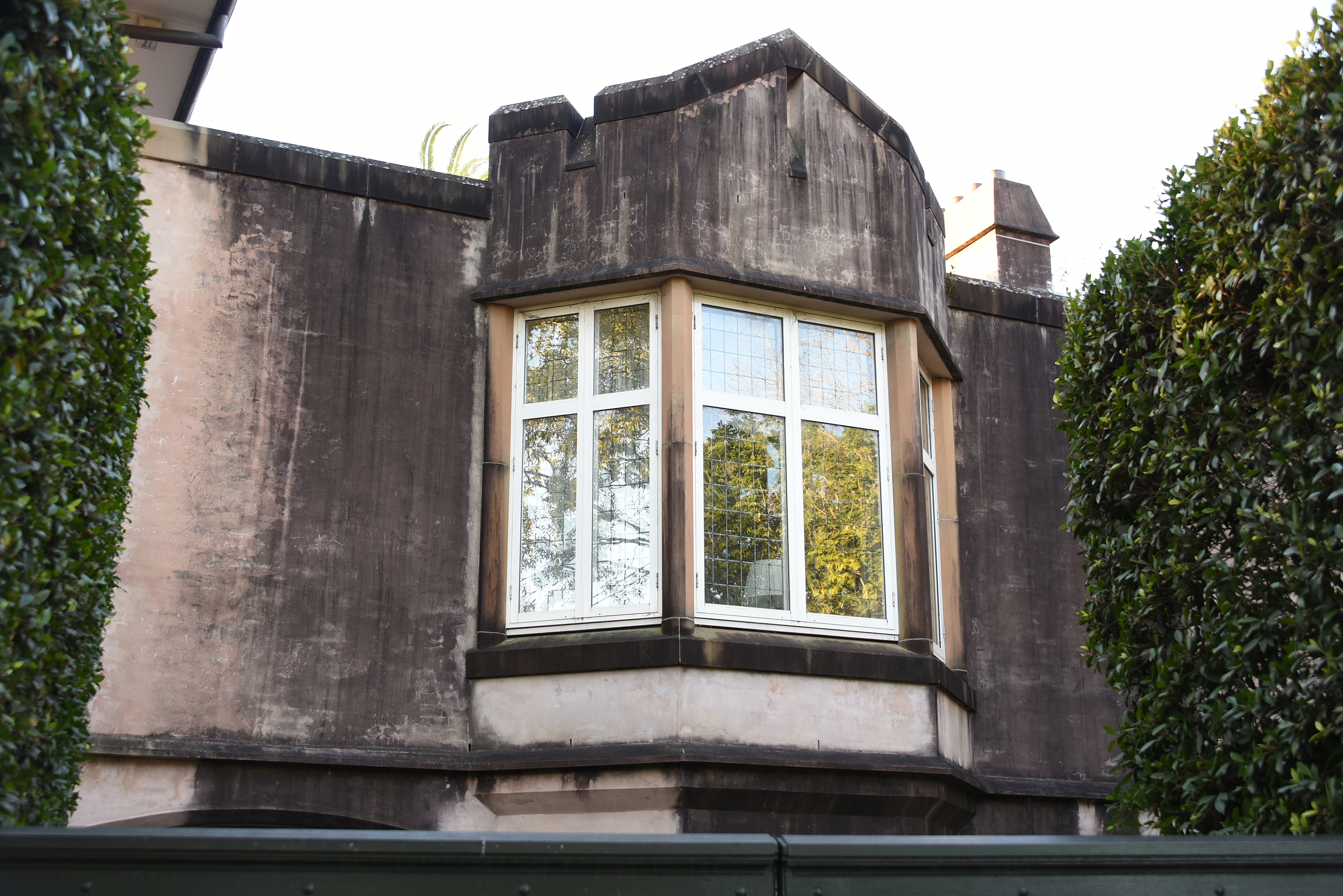

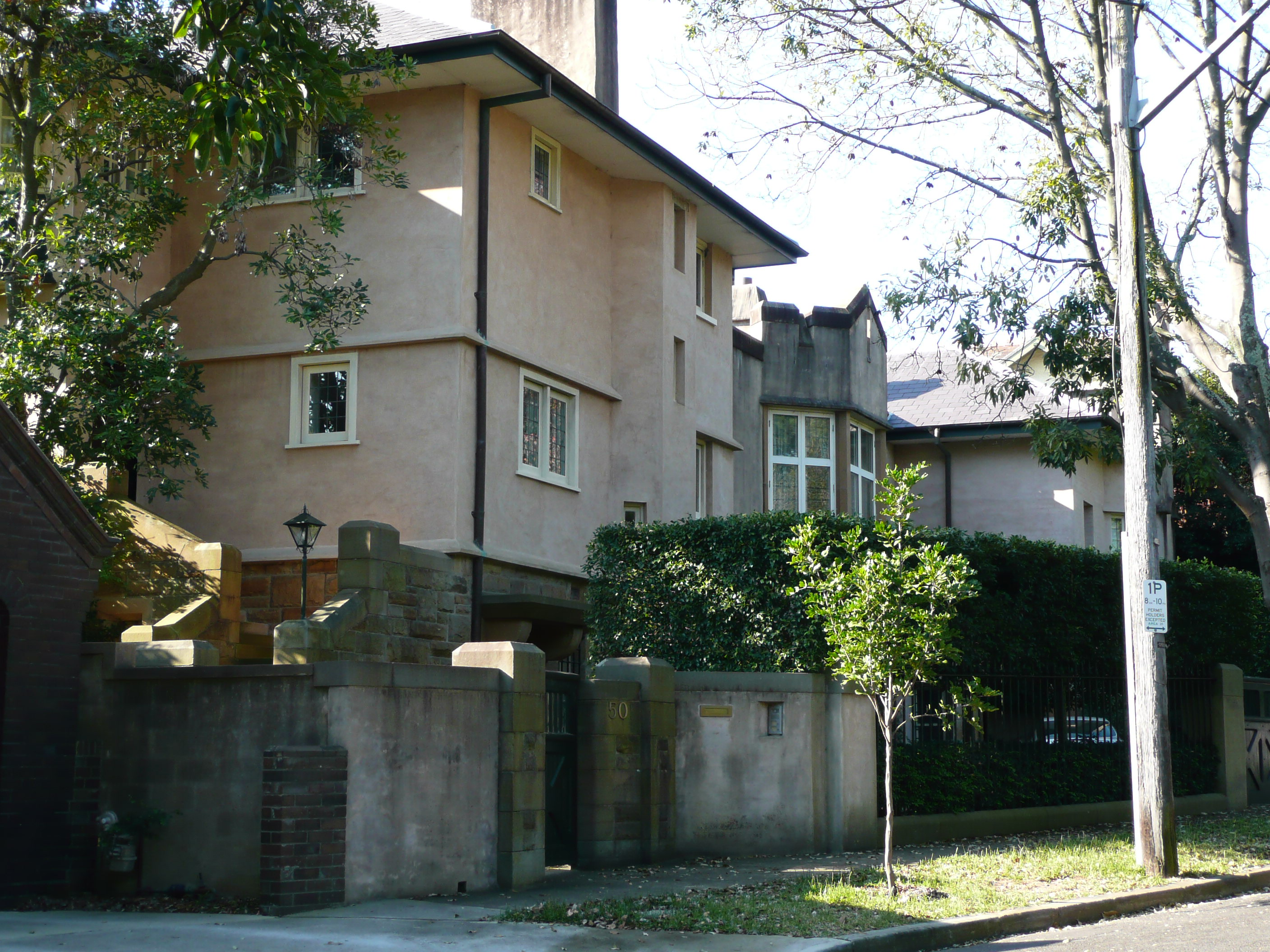
