= The Crossways (Toronto) =

Building complex in Toronto, Ontario

Coordinates: 43.65694°N 79.45175°W

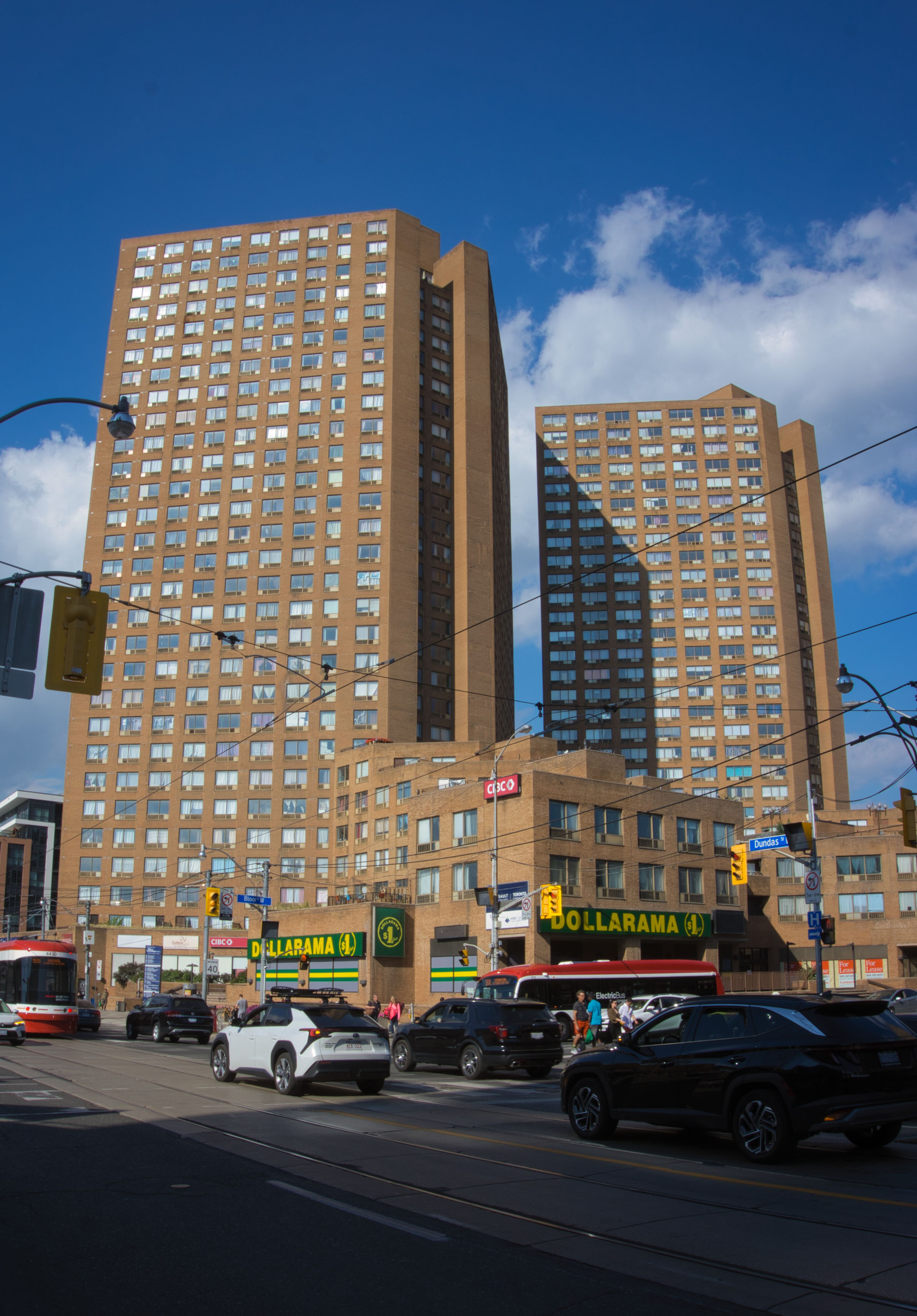
- The Crossways complex in 2025
- Interactive map of the The Crossways area

General information
- Status: Completed
- Location: 2340 Dundas Street West; Toronto, Ontario
- Completed: 1977
- Owner: Creccal Investments Ltd.

Design and construction
- Architect: Webb Zerafa Menkès Housden Partnership
- Developer: Consolidated Building Corporation

The Crossways is a mixed-use residential/commercial complex in the west end of Toronto, Ontario, Canada, located at the intersection of Bloor Street West and Dundas Street West. It stretches across most of a city block.

== History ==
In 1971, developer Consolidated Building Corporation agreed to buy the four-acre site, home to a bread factory, from Corporate Foods (now Canada Bread).

Residential and retail leasing of The Crossways began in early 1976, and construction of the $30-million complex was completed in 1977.

== Architecture ==
The complex consists of twin 29-storey (92 m) triangular brick towers, with a broad, terraced podium at their bases. One level of the podium contains an indoor mall. The Crossways was designed in the Brutalist style by architects Webb Zerafa Menkès Housden Partnership and built by Consolidated Building Corporation. It was completed in 1977 as a 111,480-square-metre (1.2 million square feet) mixed-use project. The mall's interior was a cohesive series of spaces characterized by strong 1970s design features such as walls clad in brick from floor to ceiling, brown brick floor tiles, lacquered and evenly spaced wood slat ceilings, and massive globe-light lanterns mounted onto the walls. The retail mall section was renovated in 2012 and 2013, and it no longer exhibits the original 1970s design features.

The project won a 1977 award in residential building design from the Canadian Housing Design Council, a body funded by the Central Mortgage and Housing Corporation.

A 3,900-square-metre (42,000 square feet) addition, designed by architect Chris A. Montgomery, added two floors of commercial office space to the roof of the existing complex and connected to the existing retail mall.

The enclosed 7,900 square metre (85,000 square foot) mall at the base of the twin apartment towers has more than 40 stores and services, composed of small independent businesses and services. For many years, until the late 1990s, the mall had a regular-size grocery store on its lower level, initially a Food City and subsequently an IGA store. In addition, there used to be a Boots Drug Store in the mall.

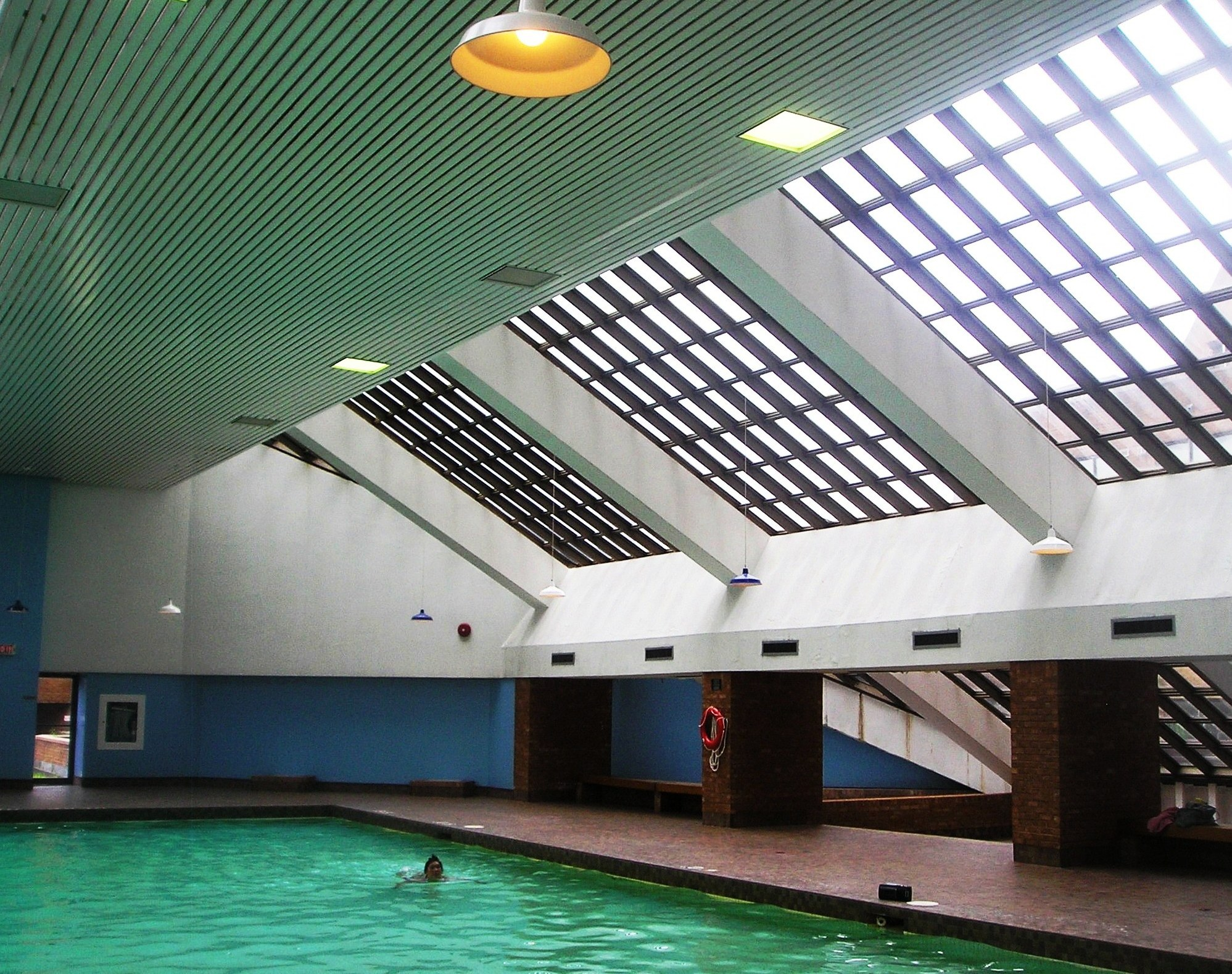
A swimming pool is provided for tenants

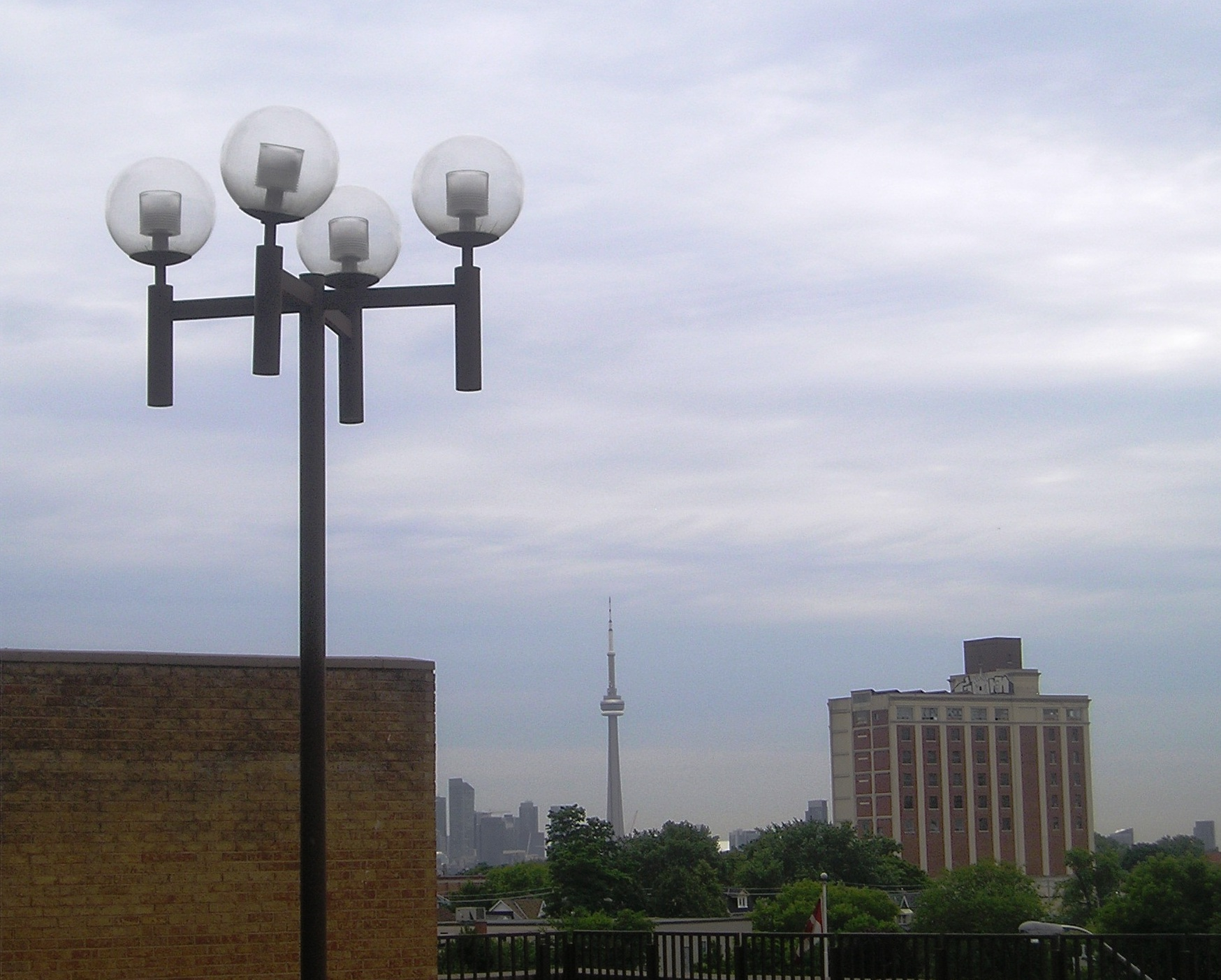
A terrace has a view of the CN Tower

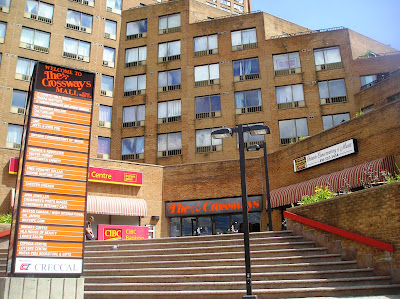
The mall entrance from Dundas Street West

== Ownership ==
The complex is owned by Creccal Investments Ltd.
