= Grace Dieu Abbey, Monmouth =

Coordinates: 51°48′50″N 2°47′51″W

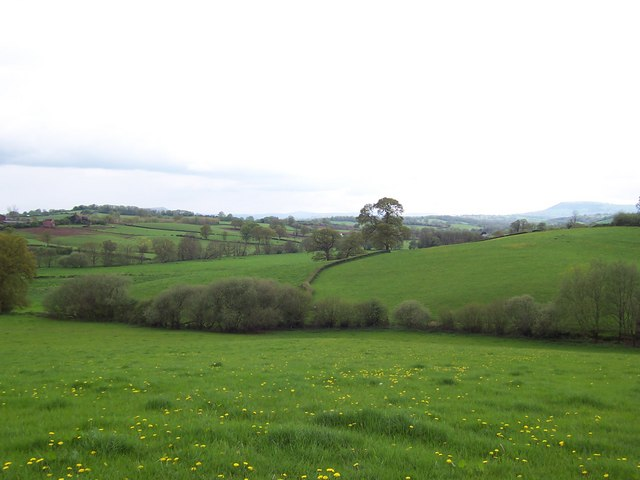
Valley of the River Trothy looking across the fields that once belonged to the Abbey and more recently to Parc Grace Dieu parish. Parc Grace Dieu farm, near the approximate original site of the Abbey, is at the left edge of the picture

Grace Dieu Abbey was a small Cistercian abbey established in 1226 near to the town of Monmouth in south east Wales. No remains of its buildings can now be seen above ground. It was originally located on the west bank of the River Trothy, in remote countryside about 2 miles (3.2 km) north of the village of Dingestow, but relocated on at least one occasion after being attacked by the Welsh. Its final site is uncertain, but investigations have focused on a field on the east side of the Trothy, at grid reference SO45121311, and this is the location labeled on OS maps.

The abbey was founded by John of Monmouth, who requested permission to establish it in 1217. It was the last Cistercian foundation in Wales. A founding community was sent from its mother house, Dore Abbey in Herefordshire, in 1226, when the abbey was dedicated to the Virgin Mary. It was always poor, although it owned land on both sides of the River Wye. The abbey held a grange, known variously as Wyesham Grange or Beaulieu Grange, east of Monmouth, land now known as Beaulieu Farm. The abbey was attacked by the Welsh in 1232, razed to the ground the following year, and relocated from its original site in 1236. King Henry III of England granted them trees from Grosmont Forest and Seinfremy Wood in 1240 and 1253. The community sought to relocate again in 1276. About 1291 the abbey has an estimated net income of £18 5s, 8d. In 1356, it was granted use of the chantry chapel in Monmouth Castle.

The abbey was dissolved in 1536, under the Act of Suppression.
