= St Maughans =

Village in Monmouthshire, Wales

Coordinates: 51.84988°N 2.78391°W

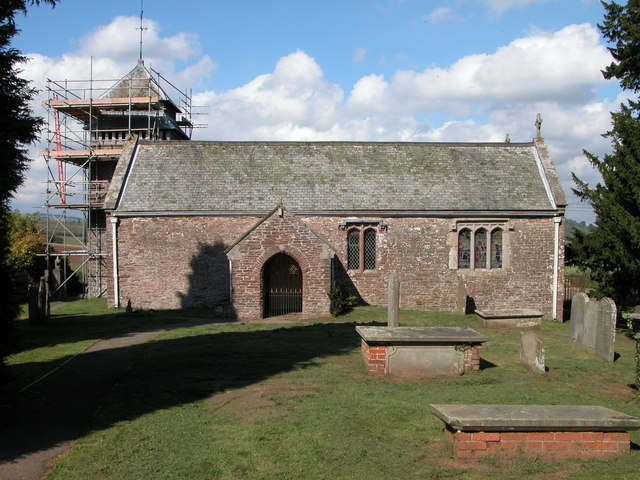
St Maughans Church

St Maughans (Welsh: Llanfocha) is a village in Monmouthshire, south east Wales, United Kingdom.

== Location ==
St Maughans is located three miles north west of Monmouth.

== History and amenities ==
In around 860, Britcon and Iliuc gave Lann Mocha (St Maughans) to Archbishop Dyfrig with the consent of King Meurig ab Arthfael.

St Maughans is close to the River Monnow and the border with England. The parish contains the Hilston Park.

The village has a church dedicated to Saint Maughan, which dates from the 12th or 13th century and has a distinctive local dovecote belfry. The church was much restored by the architect J. P. Seddon in 1865/6.

The village has given its name to the St Maughans Formation, the lowest Devonian rocks of the Old Red Sandstone.
