= B4347 road =

Road in England and Wales

B4347 towards Skenfrith

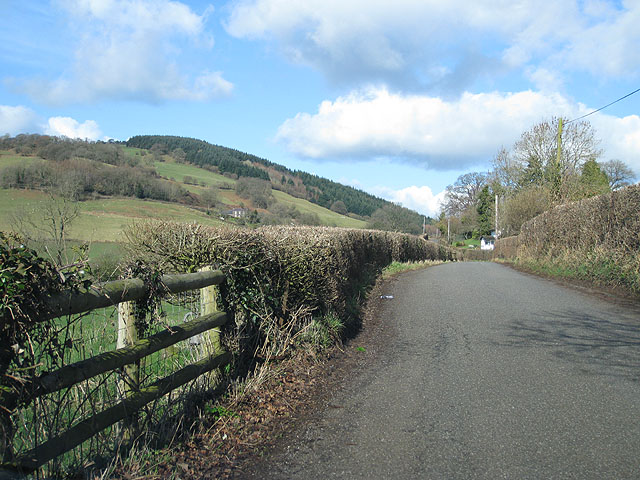
Approaching Grosmont from Skenfrith

B4347 road is a road in Monmouthshire, south-eastern Wales, and crosses the border into Herefordshire, England. The road begins at 51°49′38″N 2°45′0″W in Rockfield, to the northwest of Monmouth as a continuation of the B4233 road. It passes through the village of Skenfrith. The road ends at the junction with the B4348 to the west of Kingstone, Herefordshire at 52°1′25″N 2°55′21″W. The road crosses the River Monnow.

In its upper part the road and the B4348 are known as Golden Valley Road. Numerous notable landmarks along the road include Hilston Park, Grosmont Castle and Dore Abbey.
