= Morgan (surname) =

- Language: Welsh, Gaelic

Origin
- Region of origin: Wales

Other names
- Variant forms: Morganach, Ó Muireagáin, Morgant

Morgan is a surname of Welsh, Irish and Scottish origin.

== Origins and variants ==
Principally a Welsh name, Morgan is derived from the Old Welsh personal name Morcant, which is of an uncertain origin. In Wales, Morgan was a powerful Welsh family established c. 1330 by Morgan ap Llewelyn (son of Llewelyn ap Ifor, Lord of St. Clere, and Angharad, daughter and heiress of Sir Morgan ap Maredudd, Lord of Tredegar). It is possible the name was derived from the Cornovii Tribe who lived in the North of Scotland and in the Severn Valley, near the Wrekin hill in Shropshire. The County of Glamorgan is named after the Morgan Princes of South Wales. The term for water sprites in Welsh is morgans.

In Ireland, Morgan is an anglicised form of Irish Gaelic Ó Muireagáin meaning 'descendant of Muireagán', a clan who were lords of Teffia in County Westmeath and County Longford.

Clan Morgan is the designation for the Mackays of the Reay Country and the surname is also found in Aberdeenshire. The Pictish form is Morgunn.

=== Distribution ===
At the time of the British Census of 1881, the frequency of the surname "Morgan" was highest in Brecknockshire (over 16 times the national average), followed by Monmouthshire, Glamorgan, Carmarthenshire, Radnorshire, Montgomeryshire, Cardiganshire, Pembrokeshire, Herefordshire, and Shropshire.

== People with the surname ==
- Aaron Morgan (born 1988), American football player
- Aaron Morgan (rugby league) (born 1978), Australian rugby league footballer
- Abel Morgan (1673–1722), Welsh Baptist minister
- Abi Morgan (born 1968), Welsh playwright and screenwriter
- Ablade Morgan (born 1980), Ghanaian footballer
- Adam Morgan (Australian footballer) (born 1981), Australian rules footballer
- Adam Morgan (baseball) (born 1990), American baseball player
- Adam Morgan (English footballer) (born 1994), English footballer
- Adam Morgan (politician) (born 1989), American politician from South Carolina
- Adam Morgan (racing driver) (born 1988), British racing driver
- Adrian Lewis Morgan (born 1973), Welsh actor
- Agnes Morgan (1879–1976), American director, theatrical producer and actor
- Agnes Fay Morgan (1884–1968), American chemist
- Aidan Morgan (born 2001), New Zealand rugby union player
- Al Morgan (bassist) (1908–1974), American jazz double-bassist
- Al Morgan (pianist) (1915–1989), American pianist
- Al Morgan (writer) (1920–2011), American writer and producer
- Alan Morgan (bishop) (1940–2011), British bishop
- Alan Morgan (footballer, born 1973) (born 1973), Welsh footballer
- Alan Morgan (footballer, born 1983) (born 1983), Scottish footballer
- Alan Morgan (politician) (born 1988), American politician from South Carolina
- Alan Morgan (sailor) (1909–1984), American sailor
- Alasdair Morgan (born 1945), Scottish politician
- Alastair Morgan (born 1958), British diplomat
- Alayna Morgan (1948–2009), American heavyweight woman
- Albert T. Morgan (1842–1922), American politician from Mississippi
- Albie Morgan (born 2000), English footballer
- Alec Morgan (1908–1957), Australian rules footballer
- Alex Morgan (born 1989), American soccer player
- Alex Morgan (Australian footballer) (born 1996), Australian rules footballer
- Alex Morgan (runner) (born 1972), Jamaican athlete
- Alexander Morgan (cyclist) (born 1994), Australian cyclist
- Alexander Morgan (mathematician) (1860–1946), Scottish mathematician
- Alfred Morgan (footballer) (born 1879), English footballer
- Alfred Morgan (painter) (1836–1924), British painter
- Alfred Powell Morgan (1889–1972), American electrical engineer
- Alisha Thomas Morgan (born 1978), American politician from Georgia
- Allen Morgan (ornithologist) (1925–1990), American ornithologist
- Allen Morgan (priest) (1761–1830)
- Allen Morgan (rowing) (1925–2011), American rower
- Allen B. Morgan Jr., American businessman
- Alma Bennett Morgan (1877–1960), First Lady of West Virginia
- Alton Morgan (1932–2022), American politician from Maine
- Alun Morgan (1928–2018), British jazz critic and writer
- Ambrose Morgan (1947–1975), Australian rugby league player
- Amelie Morgan (born 2003), British artistic gymnast
- Andre Morgan (born 2000), American film producer
- Andrew Morgan (cricketer) (born 1945), English cricketer
- Andrew Morgan (cross-country skier) (1934–2026), British cross-country skier
- Andrew Morgan (musician) (1900–1972), American jazz musician
- Andrew D. Morgan (1859–1934), American lawyer
- Andrew Price Morgan (1836–1907), American botanist and mycologist
- Andrew R. Morgan (born 1976), American astronaut
- Angela Morgan (1875–1957), American poet
- Angelique Morgan (born 1975), French pornographic actress
- Ann Haven Morgan (1882–1966), American zoologist and ecologist
- Anna Morgan (teacher) (1851–1936), American educator
- Anna Euphemia Morgan (1874–1935), Aboriginal leader
- Anne Morgan (author) (born 1954), Australian children's author
- Anne Morgan (make-up artist), American make-up artist
- Anne Morgan (philanthropist) (1873–1952), American philanthropist
- Anne Eugenia Felicia Morgan (1845–1901), American academic
- Annika Morgan (born 2002), German snowboarder
- Anthony Morgan (American football) (born 1967), American football player
- Anthony Morgan (comedian), Australian actor, writer and stand-up comedian
- Anthony Morgan (politician) (1621–1668), English Royalist politician and soldier
- Arnie Morgan (1942–2025), GB & England international rugby league footballer
- Arthur Morgan (Australian politician, born 1856) (1856–1916), Australian politician from Queensland
- Arthur Morgan (Australian politician, born 1881) (1881–1957), Australian politician from Queensland
- Arthur Morgan (Irish politician) (born 1954), Irish politician
- Arthur C. Morgan (1904–1994), American sculptor
- Arthur Ernest Morgan (1878–1975), First Chairman, Tennessee Valley Authority
- Arthur Eustace Morgan (1886–1972), British academic
- Ashtone Morgan (born 1991), Canadian soccer player
- Augustus De Morgan (1806–1871), British mathematician and logician
- Barry Morgan (bishop) (born 1947), Welsh Anglican bishop
- Barry Morgan (musician) (1944–2007), British drummer
- Bob Morgan (baseball) (born 1947), American baseball player and coach
- Bob Morgan (costume designer), American costume designer
- Bob Morgan (diver) (born 1967), British diver
- Bob Morgan (gridiron football) (1930–1991), American football player
- Bob Morgan (Illinois politician), American politician from ILlinois
- Bob Morgan (priest) (1928–2011), Welsh vicar and politician
- Bonnie Morgan, contortionist and actress
- Carroll Morgan (boxer), Canadian heavyweight boxer
- Carroll Morgan (computer scientist), American-Australian computer scientist
- Cederian Morgan (born 2007), American football player
- Chad Morgan (1933–2025), Australian country music singer and guitarist
- Chad Morgan (actress) (born 1973), American actress
- Charles Waln Morgan, whaling executive
- Chesty Morgan (born 1937), exotic dancer
- Chris Morgan (American football), American football player and coach
- Chris Morgan (ecologist) (born 1968), British ecologist and conservationist
- Chris Morgan (filmmaker) (born 1966), American screenwriter
- Chris Morgan (footballer) (born 1977), English footballer
- Chris Morgan (journalist) (1952–2008), British journalist
- Chris Morgan (politician) (born 2000), British politician
- Chris Morgan (powerlifter) (born 1973), British powerlifter
- Chris Morgan (rower) (born 1982), Australian rower
- Cindy Morgan, real name Cynthia Cichorski, American actress
- Clement G. Morgan, attorney, civil rights activist, and public official
- Cliff Morgan, Welsh rugby union player
- C. Lloyd Morgan, British psychologist known by "Morgan's Canon"
- Colin Morgan, Northern Irish actor, star of television series Merlin
- Conor Morgan, Canadian basketball player
- Constance Morrow Morgan (1913–1995), educator and philanthropist
- Cory Morgan (blogger) (born 1971), Canadian politician from Alberta
- Cory Morgan (ice hockey) (born 1978), Canadian ice hockey player
- Dale Morgan (1914–1971), American historian of the American west
- Dan Morgan, American football player
- Daniel Morgan, brigadier general in the Continental Army in the American Revolution
- Dave Morgan (Australian footballer) (1930–2025), Australian rules footballer
- Dave Morgan (racing driver) (1944–2018), British racing driver
- Dave Morgan (weightlifter) (born 1964), Welsh weightlifter
- David Morgan (Arizona politician) (1866–1930), American politician from Arizona
- David Morgan (art historian) (born 1957), American art historian
- David Morgan (baseball) (born 1999), American baseball player
- David Morgan (businessman) (born 1947), Australian businessman
- David Morgan (comedian), British stand-up comedian
- David Morgan (composer) (1933–1988), British composer
- David Morgan (cricket administrator) (born 1937), Welsh cricket administrator
- David Morgan (frontiersman) (1721–1813), Early western Virginian frontiersman, pioneer, mountaineer, and soldier
- David Morgan (Jacobite) (born 1695), Welsh lawyer
- David Morgan (journalist) (1959–2016), British journalist, born 1959
- David Morgan (judge) (1849–1912), American judge
- David Morgan (Northern Irish footballer) (born 1994), Northern Irish association football player
- David Morgan (psychoanalyst), British psychoanalyst
- David Morgan (Royal Navy officer) (born 1947), Falklands War fighter pilot
- David Morgan (rugby union, born 1863), Wales international rugby union player
- David Morgan (rugby union, born 1872) (1872–1933), Wales international rugby union player
- David Morgan (rugby union, born 1969), New Zealand rugby union player
- David Morgan (sociologist) (1937–2020), British sociologist
- David Morgan (swimmer) (born 1994), Australian swimmer
- David Morgan (trade unionist) (1840–1900), Welsh miners' agent and trade unionist
- David Morgan II (born 1993), American football player
- David Eirwyn Morgan (1918–1982), Welsh minister and journalist
- David John Morgan (1844–1918), British politician
- David Lee Morgan Jr. (born 1965), American sportswriter
- David O. Morgan (1945–2019), British historian and academic
- David Owen Morgan (1893–1959), British zoologist
- David R. Morgan (2000–2023), American political scientist
- David Thomas Morgan (1809–1886), British timber merchant
- David Watcyn Morgan (1859–1940), Welsh priest
- David Watts Morgan (1867–1933), Welsh politician
- David William Rowsen Morgan (1892–1973), American mechanical engineer and business executive
- Debelah Morgan (born 1977), American singer and songwriter
- Dell Morgan (1900–1962), American college sports coach
- Dennis Morgan (1908–1994), American actor
- Denroy Morgan (1946–2022), Jamaican American reggae artist
- Dermot Morgan (1952–1998), Irish comedian and actor
- Derrick Morgan (born 1989), NFL player
- Diane Morgan, English actress, comedian and writer
- Don Morgan (born 1951), Canadian politician from Saskatchewan
- Doug Morgan (Australian footballer) (1886–1958), Australian rules footballer
- Doug Morgan (footballer, born 1890) (1890–1916), Scottish footballer
- Dougie Morgan (1947–2020), British Lions & Scotland international rugby union player
- Ed Morgan (baseball) (1904–1980), American baseball player
- Ed Morgan (professor) (born 1955), Canadian jurist
- Eddie Morgan (baseball) (1914–1982), American baseball player
- Eddie Morgan (rugby union) (1913–1978), GB & Wales international rugby union player
- Edgar Morgan (rugby union, born 1882) (1882–1962), GB & Wales international rugby union player
- Edgar Morgan (rugby, born 1896) (1896–1983), GB & Wales international rugby league & union player
- Edmund Morgan (bishop) (1888–1979), British Anglican bishop
- Edmund Morgan (historian) (1916–2013), American historian
- Edmund Morgan (of Llandaff), English politician
- Eduardo Morgan (died 2015), Argentine rugby union footballer
- Edward Morgan (archdeacon), Irish Anglican priest in the 17th century
- Edward Morgan (choreographer), American dancer and choreographer
- Edward Morgan (governor) (1610–1665), British politician
- Edward Morgan (priest, died 1642), Welsh Catholic Priest and Martyr
- Edward Delmar Morgan (1840–1909), British explorer and writer
- Edward M. Morgan (1855–1925), American postmaster
- Edward P. Morgan (1910–1993), American journalist
- Edwin Morgan (poet) (1920–2010), Scottish poet and essayist
- Edwin B. Morgan (1806–1881), American politician from New York
- Edwin D. Morgan (1811–1883), Union Army general and politician from New York
- Edwin D. Morgan (businessman) (1921–2001), American businessman
- Edwin D. Morgan III (1854–1933), American yachtsman
- Edwin Vernon Morgan (1865–1934), American diplomat
- Elaine Morgan (writer), Welsh writer, advocate of the aquatic ape hypothesis
- Eli Morgan (born 1996), American baseball pitcher
- Elizabeth Chambers Morgan (1850–1944), American labor organizer
- Eoin Morgan, Irish cricketer
- Esme Morgan, English professional footballer
- Esther Morgan (footballer) (born 2002), Wales international footballer
- Esther Morgan (poet) (born 1970), British poet
- Ffion Morgan (born 2000), Welsh footballer
- Frank Morgan (1890–1949), American actor
- Frederick E. Morgan, British lieutenant-general in the Second World War
- Garrett A. Morgan (1877–1963), African American inventor
- Gavin Morgan (born 1976), Canadian ice hockey player
- George Morgan (disambiguation), multiple people
- Gerry Morgan (born 1953), Canadian entrepreneur
- Gladys Morgan (1898–1983), Welsh comedian
- Godfrey Morgan, 1st Viscount Tredegar (1831–1913), Welsh philanthropist
- Gramps Morgan, real name Roy Morgan, Jamaican American reggae artist
- Harry Morgan (1915–2011), American actor
- Hayden Morgan (1933–2017), American politician from Missouri
- Helen Morgan (singer) (1900–1941), American actress
- Helen Morgan (politician), British politician
- Henry Morgan (disambiguation), multiple people
- Henry Morgan, Welsh privateer and governor of Jamaica
- Huey Morgan, American musician
- Ian Morgan, English professional footballer
- Isabel Morgan, American virologist
- Ivor Morgan, Welsh international rugby union player
- J. P. Morgan (disambiguation), multiple people
- J. R. Morgan, British academic and author
- Jack Morgan (disambiguation), multiple people
- Jacques de Morgan, French geologist
- James Morgan (disambiguation), multiple people
- Jason Morgan (disambiguation), multiple people
- Jedediah Morgan (1774–1826), American politician from New York
- Jeffrey Dean Morgan (born 1966), American actor
- Jennifer Morgan (born 1971), American businessperson
- Jeremy Morgan (born 1995), American basketball player
- Jim Morgan (disambiguation), multiple people
- Jimmy Morgan, English footballer and Royal Marines commando
- Joanna Morgan, British geoscientist
- Joe Morgan (disambiguation), multiple people
- Joe Morgan (1943–2020), American baseball player and sportscaster
- Joe "Pegleg" Morgan (1929–1993), American fugitive
- John Morgan (disambiguation), multiple people
- John Hunt Morgan, American Civil War cavalry general CSA
- Jordan Morgan (disambiguation), multiple people
- Joseph Morgan (disambiguation), multiple people
- Josh Morgan, NFL wide receiver
- Josiah Lewis Morgan (1893–1982), Welsh soldier
- Julia Morgan, American architect
- Julie Morgan, British politician
- Junius Spencer Morgan, American banker and financier
- Justin Morgan (disambiguation), multiple people
- Juwan Morgan (born 1997), American basketball player
- Karl Z. Morgan (1907–1999), American physicist
- Kate Morgan (c. 1864 – 1892), American housemaid
- Katie Morgan, American pornographic actress
- Kathryn Morgan (born 1988), American ballet dancer
- Keith Morgan (judoka), Canadian judoka
- Kenneth O. Morgan, Welsh historian
- Kevin Morgan (disambiguation), multiple people
- Lael Morgan (1936–2022), American journalist and author
- Laurie Morgan (1930–2018), Guernsey's first Chief Minister
- Lawrence Morgan (1915–1997), Australian dual Olympic gold medalist
- Lawrence T. Morgan, former Speaker of the Navajo Nation Tribal Council
- Laza Morgan (born 1976), Jamaican-American singer and rapper
- Lee Morgan (1938–1972), American jazz trumpeter
- Léster Morgan (1976–2002), Costa Rican footballer
- Lewis H. Morgan (1818–1881), American politician and anthropologist from New York
- Lewis L. Morgan (1876–1950), American politician from Louisiana
- Lionel Morgan (disambiguation), multiple people
- Liv Morgan (born 1994), ring name of American wrestler Gionna Daddio
- Lorrie Morgan, country music singer
- Marabel Morgan (born 1937), American author
- Mary Kimball Morgan (1861–1948), American educator and college president
- Matt Morgan (born 1976), American professional wrestler
- Matthew Somerville Morgan (1837–1890), British cartoonist
- Maverick Morgan (born 1994), American football player
- Meli'sa Morgan (born 1964), American singer-songwriter
- Michael Morgan (disambiguation), multiple people
- Michèle Morgan (1920–2016), French film and television actress
- Michelle Morgan (disambiguation), multiple people named Michele and Michelle
- Middy Morgan (1828–1892), Irish-born American journalist
- Mohammed Said Hersi Morgan (1949–2025), Somali warlord
- Morgan Morgan (1688–1766), First settler in present-day West Virginia
- Morris H. Morgan (1859–1910), American classical scholar
- Nathan Morgan (born 1978), English long jumper
- Nicholas Morgan (disambiguation), multiple people
- Nicky Morgan (born 1972), British politician
- Nicola Morgan (born 1961), British author
- Olly Morgan, England and Gloucester Rugby Union player
- Paul Morgan (disambiguation), multiple people
- Peter Morgan (disambiguation), multiple people
- Piers Morgan (born 1965), British broadcaster and former tabloid newspaper editor
- P. J. Morgan (born 1940), American politician from Nebraska
- Raphael Morgan (c. 1866–1922), Jamaican-American priest
- Read Morgan (1931–2022), American film and television actor
- Red Morgan (American football) (born 2006), American football player
- Rhodri Morgan, former First Minister of Wales
- Richard Morgan (disambiguation), multiple people
- Richie Morgan, Welsh footballer and manager
- Robert B. Morgan (1925–2016), American politician from North Carolina
- Robert Morgan (historian) (1938–2011), Canadian historian
- Robert W. Morgan (1937–1998), American disc jockey
- Roger Morgan (disambiguation), multiple people
- Ryan Morgan, Australian Rugby league player
- Sally Morgan (disambiguation), multiple people
- Shaun Morgan (born 1978), South African singer
- Sheryl Morgan, sprinter
- Simon Morgan, English football (soccer) player
- Sophia Morgan, Fijian sailor
- Sophie Morgan (born 1985), British television presenter
- Sophie Morgan (author) (born 1979), British author
- Sophie Morgan (singer-songwriter) (born 1997), English singer-songwriter
- Stanley Morgan (author), English actor & author
- Stanley Morgan, wide receiver in American gridiron football
- Stanley Morgan Jr. (born 1996), American football player
- Steve Morgan (disambiguation), multiple people
- Sylvanus Morgan (1620 – March 27, 1693), English arms-painter and author
- Tanner Morgan (born 1999), American football player
- Tara Morgan, Australian rules footballer
- Ted Morgan (boxer), New Zealand boxer
- Ted Morgan (writer) (1932–2023), French-American biographer, journalist, and historian
- Teddy Morgan, Welsh international rugby union player
- Terence Morgan (1921–2005), English actor
- Thomas Morgan (disambiguation), multiple people
- Tom Morgan (disambiguation), multiple people
- Tonie Morgan, American basketball player
- Tracy Morgan, American actor and comedian
- Trevor Morgan (disambiguation), multiple people
- Wallace Morgan, World War I artist in the United States Army
- Wendy Morgan (disambiguation), multiple people
- Wes Morgan, Jamaican footballer
- William Morgan (disambiguation), multiple people

== Fictional characters ==
- Arthur Morgan (Red Dead), protagonist of the video game Red Dead Redemption 2
- Derek Morgan (Criminal Minds) in the American crime drama Criminal Minds
- Dexter Morgan, serial killer from the eponymous TV franchise
- Jason Morgan (General Hospital), Mob Enforcer on the ABC Daytime Soap Opera General Hospital
- Jenna Morgan from Arthur
- Kate Morgan, lead character in 24: Live Another Day
- Kendall Morgan, a character in the Power Rangers Dino Charge
- Lilah Morgan, evil lawyer in the 1999 TV series Angel
- Nathan Drake (Né Morgan), protagonist of the video game Uncharted
- Samara Morgan, evil killer in the 2002 film The Ring
- Trevor Morgan (EastEnders) in the British soap opera EastEnders

== See also ==
- Morgan (disambiguation)
- Morgan (given name)
- De Morgan
- Justice Morgan (disambiguation)
- Morgans (surname)
