= David Morgan =

David or Dave Morgan may refer to:

== Academics ==
- David Watcyn Morgan (1859–1940), dean of St David's, 1931–1940
- David Owen Morgan (1893–1959), British zoologist
- David Morgan (sociologist) (1937–2020), British sociologist
- David O. Morgan (1945–2019), professor of history at the University of Wisconsin–Madison
- David Morgan (art historian), professor of religious studies
- David M. Morgan, chancellor of Deakin University
- David R. Morgan (1933–2023), professor of political science at the University of Oklahoma
- David Morgan, otherwise Dewi Morgan (1877–1971), Welsh bard, scholar and journalist

== Politics ==
- David Morgan (Jacobite) (1690s–1746), Welsh lawyer involved in the Jacobite rising of 1745
- David Morgan (trade unionist) (1840–1900), Welsh miners' agent and trade unionist
- David Morgan (judge) (1849–1912), United States judge who served as Chief Justice of North Dakota
- David Watts Morgan (1867–1933), Welsh trade unionist and Member of Parliament
- David Eirwyn Morgan (1918–1982), Welsh minister, trade unionist and politician
- David John Morgan (1844–1917), British Member of Parliament for Walthamstow, 1900–1906

== Sports ==
- David Morgan (rugby union, born 1863) (1863–1920), Welsh international rugby union player
- David Morgan (rugby union, born 1872) (1872–1933), Welsh international rugby player
- David Morgan (rugby union, born 1969), New Zealand rugby union player
- David Morgan (cricket administrator) (born 1937), Welsh
- David Lee Morgan Jr. (born 1965), American sportswriter
- David Morgan II (born 1993), American football tight end
- David Morgan (Northern Irish footballer) (born 1994)
- David Morgan (swimmer) (born 1994), Australian swimmer
- David Morgan (baseball) (born 1999), American baseball pitcher
- Dave Morgan (Australian footballer) (born 1930), Australian footballer for Collingwood
- Dave Morgan (racing driver) (1944–2018), British former racing driver
- Dave Morgan (weightlifter) (born 1964), weightlifter from Wales

== Other ==
- David Morgan (frontiersman) (1721–1813), American frontiersman
- David Morgan (composer) (1933–1988), British composer
- David Morgan (businessman) (born 1947), Australian businessman
- David Morgan (Royal Navy officer) (born 1947), British fighter pilot
- David Morgan (journalist) (1959–2016), Northern Irish television presenter and journalist
- David Morgan (comedian), British stand-up comedian
- David Morgan (department store), a department store in Cardiff, Wales
- David Morgan (psychoanalyst), British psychoanalyst
- David Bannister Morgan (1772–1845), U.S. adjutant general at the Battle of New Orleans
- David Morgan, British musician, member of Lovestation
- David Morgan, birth name of David Scott-Morgan (born 1942), British musician

== See also ==
- David Hughes-Morgan (1871–1941), Welsh solicitor and landowner
