= Edward Morgan =

Edward, Ted, Teddy, Ed, Eddy or Eddie Morgan may refer to:

== Sports ==
- Teddy Morgan (1880–1949), Welsh international rugby union player
- Ted Morgan (boxer) (1906–1952), Olympic boxer from New Zealand
- Eddie Morgan (rugby union) (1913–1978), Wales international rugby player
- Ed Morgan (baseball) (1904–1980), American baseball player for the Cleveland Indians and Boston Red Sox
- Eddie Morgan (baseball) (1914–1982), American baseball player for the St. Louis Cardinals and Brooklyn Dodgers

== Politics and law ==
- Edward Morgan (governor) (died 1665), Welsh politician, governor of Jamaica
- J. Ed Morgan (born 1947), American politician, Mississippi state senator
- Ed Morgan (professor) (born 1955), Canadian professor of international law

== Others ==
- Edward Morgan (priest, died 1642), Welsh Catholic priest
- Sir Edward Morgan, 1st Baronet (died 1653), Welsh noble, Catholic supporter of King Charles I during the English Civil War
- Edward Morgan (archdeacon) (fl. 1660s–1670s), Irish Anglican priest
- Edward Delmar Morgan (1840–1909), English explorer and linguist
- Edward M. Morgan (1855–1925), American postmaster of New York
- Edward P. Morgan (1910–1993), American newspaper, radio and television journalist
- Ted Morgan (writer) (1932–2023), French-American biographer, journalist, and historian
- Edward Morgan (choreographer) (fl. 1990s), American dancer and choreographer

== See also ==
- Edwin Morgan (disambiguation)
