= George Morgan =

George Morgan may refer to:

== Arts and entertainment ==
- George T. Morgan (1845–1925), British-born engraver, designer of the Morgan Dollar
- George Morgan (screenwriter) (1854–1936), American screenwriter
- George E. Morgan (1870–1969), American artist
- George Frederick Morgan (1922–2004), American poet
- George Morgan (singer) (1924–1975), American country music singer

== Military ==
- George W. Morgan (1820–1893), American Civil War Union general
- George N. Morgan (1825–1866), Canadian-born American Civil War general, father of George H. Morgan
- George H. Morgan (1855–1948), American cavalry officer and Medal of Honor recipient

== Politics and law ==
- George Morgan (New York politician) (1816–1879), American politician, New York state senator
- George Osborne Morgan (1826–1897), Welsh lawyer and politician
- George Hay Morgan (1866–1931), British member of parliament for Truro
- George Gould Morgan (1794–1845), Welsh politician and army officer, member of parliament for Brecon

== Sports ==
- George Morgan (cricketer) (1844–1896), Australian cricketer
- George Morgan (footballer) (1877–1948), Australian rules footballer
- George J. Morgan (1912–1979), Irish rugby union player
- George Morgan (tennis) (born 1993), British tennis player

== Others ==
- George Morgan (merchant) (1743–1810), American merchant and representative to Native Americans
- George Cadogan Morgan (1754–1798), Welsh dissenting minister and scientist
- G. Campbell Morgan (1863–1945), British evangelist, preacher and Bible scholar
