= John Morgan =

John Morgan may refer to:

== Academics ==
- John Morgan (economist) (1967–2021), American economist
- John Morgan (etiquette expert) (1959–2000), British expert on etiquette
- John Morgan (mathematician) (born 1946), mathematician at Stony Brook University
- John Minter Morgan (1782–1855), English author and philanthropist
- John Henry Morgan (born 1945), American professor of the history and philosophy of social science
- J. R. Morgan (born 1950), classicist and author, Swansea University

== Entertainment ==
- John Morgan (poet) (1688–c. 1733), Welsh clergyman, scholar and poet
- John Morgan (artist) (1822–1885), British painter
- John Morgan (comedian) (1930–2004), Welsh-born Canadian comedian
- John Morgan (sportscaster) (born 1950), American broadcaster and television producer
- John Morgan (The Wurzels) (1941–2021), drummer for The Wurzels
- John Morgan (singer) (born 1995), American country music singer-songwriter

== Military ==
- John Morgan (admiral) (born 1950), United States Navy admiral
- John Hunt Morgan (1825–1864), Confederate general during the American Civil War
- J. H. Morgan (1876–1955), British general and lawyer
- John C. Morgan (1914–1991), United States Army Air Forces pilot and Medal of Honor recipient

== Politics ==
=== Canada ===
- John Morgan (Canadian politician) (born 1964), mayor (2000-2012) of Cape Breton Regional Municipality, Nova Scotia

=== UK ===
- John Morgan (by 1524 – will proved 1559) (died 1550s), MP for Monmouth Boroughs
- John Morgan (fl. 1563), MP for Carmarthen Boroughs
- John Morgan (MP for Leominster) (died by 1572)
- John Morgan (merchant) (died 1715), member of parliament for Monmouth, 1701–1705
- Sir John Morgan, 2nd Baronet (c. 1650–1693), member of parliament for Radnor, 1681, and Herefordshire, 1685–1693
- John Morgan (of Rhiwpera) (1671–1720), member of parliament for Monmouthshire, 1701–1720
- Sir John Morgan, 4th Baronet (1710–1767), member of parliament for Hereford, 1734–1741, and Herefordshire, 1765–1767
- John Morgan (of Dderw) (1742–1792), member of parliament for Brecon, 1769–1771, and Monmouthshire, 1771–1792
- John Morgan (Labour politician) (1892–1940), Labour MP for Doncaster, 1938–1941
- John Lloyd Morgan (1861–1944), Welsh MP for West Carmarthenshire, 1889–1910
- Sir John Morgan (diplomat), British diplomat

=== U.S. ===
- John Morgan (Wisconsin politician) (1846–1926), member of the Wisconsin State Assembly in 1917
- John G. Morgan (born 1952), Tennessee politician
- John Hill Morgan (1870–1945), American lawyer, politician, and art expert
- John J. Morgan (1770–1849), U.S. representative from New York
- John S. Morgan (born 1963), member of the Maryland House of Delegates
- John T. Morgan (1824–1907), U.S. senator
- John T. Morgan (judge) (1831–1910), chief justice of the Idaho Supreme Court

== Religion ==
- John Morgan (archdeacon of Bangor) (1840–1924)
- John Morgan (archbishop of Wales) (1886–1957), archbishop of Wales, 1949–1957
- John Morgan (bishop of St Davids) (died 1504)
- John Morgan (missionary) (1806–1865), New Zealand missionary
- John Morgan (dean of Waterford) (1819–1904), dean of Waterford, 1877–1903
- John Hamilton Morgan (1842–1894), leader and missionary in the LDS Church
- John Aloysius Morgan (1909–2008), Australian prelate of the Roman Catholic Church

== Sports ==
=== Association football (soccer) ===
- John Morgan (footballer, born 1854) (1854–1937), Welsh international footballer
- John Morgan (footballer, born 1876) (1876–?), Welsh international footballer
- Jock Morgan (John Morgan, 1889–1983), Scottish footballer

=== Other sports ===
- Pepper Morgan (John L. Morgan, fl. 1930s), American baseball player
- John Adams Morgan (1930–2025), American Olympic sailor
- John Morgan (golfer) (1943–2006), English golfer
- John Morgan (Australian footballer) (born 1953), Australian rules footballer for Melbourne
- John Morgan (wrestler) (born 1963), American Olympic wrestler
- John Morgan (rugby league) (born 1941), Australian rugby league footballer
- John Morgan (cricketer) (born 1977), English cricketer
- John E. Morgan (born 1977), English golfer
- John Morgan (mixed martial arts journalist) (born 1978), American mixed martial arts journalist
- John Morgan (swimmer) (fl. 1984–1992), American Paralympic gold medal-winning swimmer
- John Morgan (sprinter), Welsh sprinter

== Others ==
- John Morgan (physician) (1735–1789), founder of first medical school in colonial America at University of Pennsylvania
- John Morgan (British journalist) (1929–1988), Welsh journalist and broadcaster
- John Morgan (lawyer) (born 1956), lawyer, founder of the Morgan & Morgan law firm
- John Morgan (of Tredegar), Welsh nobleman
- J. P. Morgan Jr. (1867–1943), American banker
- J. P. Morgan (1837–1913), American banker
- John Morgan, 6th Baron Tredegar (1908–1962), Welsh peer and landowner

== Other uses ==
- SS John Morgan, 1943 World War II liberty ship

== See also ==
- John H. Morgan (disambiguation)
- Morgan (surname)
