= Andrew Morgan =

Andrew Morgan may refer to:

- Andrew R. Morgan (born 1976), NASA astronaut
- Andrew Morgan (musician) (1901–1972), American jazz clarinetist and saxophonist
- Andrew D. Morgan (1859–1934), lawyer and president of Ilion, New York
- Andrew Price Morgan (1836–1907), American botanist
- Andrew Morgan (cross-country skier) (1934–2026), British Olympic skier
- Andrew Morgan (cricketer) (born 1945), English cricketer
