= Harry Morgan (disambiguation) =

Harry Morgan (1915–2011) was an American television and film actor and director.

Harri or Harry Morgan may also refer to:

- Harri Morgan (rugby union) (born 2000), Welsh rugby union player
- Harry Morgan (rugby union) (born 1930), Welsh rugby union player
- Harry Morgan (footballer) (1889–1956), Australian rules footballer
- Harry H. Morgan (1871–1924), Australian rules footballer, with Carlton FC.
- Harry S. Morgan (1945–2011), German film actor, director and producer
- Harry Hays Morgan Jr. (1898–1983), Swiss-born American diplomat, society figure and actor
- Harry Morgan (cricketer) (1938–2024), New Zealand cricketer, for the Wellington Firebirds (1963-1978)
- Harry Morgan (politician) (1857–1933), American politician
- Henry Morgan (c. 1635 – 1688), Welsh privateer known in Welsh as Harri Morgan

== Fictional characters ==
- Harry Morgan (Dexter), character in the TV series Dexter and the books it is based on
- Harry Morgan, character in the Ernest Hemingway novel To Have and Have Not, played by Humphrey Bogart in the 1944 film To Have and Have Not

== See also ==
- Henry Morgan (disambiguation)
