= James Morgan =

James Morgan may refer to:

== Military ==
- W. James Morgan (died 1866), Union Army recruiter and officer in the American Civil War
- James D. Morgan (1810–1896), American Civil War general in the Union Army
- James H. Morgan (Medal of Honor) (1840–1877), American Civil War Medal of Honor recipient

== Politics ==
=== US ===
- James Morgan (congressman) (1756–1822), U.S. Representative from New Jersey
- James B. Morgan (1833–1892), U.S. Representative from Mississippi
- James G. Morgan (1885–1964), Missouri state senator
- James H. Morgan (politician), member of the California State Assembly 1861–1862
- Jim Morgan (American politician) (born 1937), former member of Cabell County Commission and the West Virginia House of Delegates
- James McGowan Morgan (1813–1862), speaker of the Iowa Territorial House of Representatives
- James W. Morgan (1891–1971), mayor of Birmingham, Alabama 1953–1961

=== UK ===
- Sir James Morgan, 4th Baronet (1643–1718), Welsh baronet
- James Morgan (MP) (c. 1660–1717), British Member of Parliament for Weobley and Hereford

=== Australia ===
- James Morgan (Queensland politician) (1816–1878), Member of the Queensland Legislative Assembly
- James Morgan (New South Wales politician) (1853–1933), New South Wales politician

=== Canada ===
- Jim Morgan (Canadian politician) (1939–2019), politician in Newfoundland

== Sports ==
- Jimmy Morgan (footballer, born 1912) (1912–1944), Scottish footballer, Hamilton Academical
- Jimmy Morgan (William James Morgan, 1922–1976), English footballer, Bristol Rovers
- Jim Morgan (Australian rules footballer) (1924–1995), Australian rules footballer
- Jim Morgan (bowls) (1933–2022), Welsh international lawn bowler
- Jim Morgan (basketball) (1934–2019), American basketball player and race horse trainer
- Jim Morgan (rugby league) (1943–2005), Australian rugby league footballer
- James Morgan (bobsledder) (1948–1981), American who competed from mid 1970s to early 1980s
- James Morgan (gridiron football) (born 1997), American football quarterback
- James Morgan (rugby union), English international rugby union player

== Other ==
- James Morgan (engineer) (1776–1856), British architect and engineer
- James N. Morgan (1918–2018), American economist and educator
- James Morgan (journalist) (1938–2002), BBC World Service economics correspondent
- James J. Morgan (born 1942), American executive and former CEO of Atari and Philip Morris USA
- James Morgan (actor) (born 1985), British actor
- James Morgan (conductor), British conductor and composer
- James Morgan (set designer), scenic artist and producing artistic director of the York Theatre
