= Barton Peveril Sixth Form College =

Location
- Chestnut Avenue; Eastleigh, Hampshire, SO50 5ZA; England; 50.9620°N 1.3657°W

Information
- Type: Sixth Form College
- Established: 1904
- Local authority: Hampshire County Council
- Department for Education URN: 130701 Tables
- Ofsted: Reports
- Chair of the Corporation: Karen Everett
- Principal: Nicola Carcone
- Staff: 167 teachers, 105 support
- Gender: Coeducational
- Age: 16 to 18+
- Enrolment: 4783
- Website: http://www.barton-peveril.ac.uk/

Barton Peveril Sixth Form College is an Ofsted 'Outstanding' sixth form college located in Eastleigh, Hampshire, UK with approximately 5,000 students, aged 16–18. It is part of the Wessex Group of Sixth Form Colleges.

== History ==
Originally Barton Peveril School was a temporary school, founded in 1904 by the local County Education Authority, to meet the demands of the new railway town of Eastleigh. It had two long-serving head teachers, with Miss Annie Smith at the reins from the start until her retirement in 1936 and then Mr Harry Newnham Reed Moore (1897–1991), who again only left to retire in 1963. He was succeeded by Mr R. E. Bowyer.

As the school expanded, larger premises were required, with a house named Barton Peveril purchased by 1918, which later gave its name to the institution officially recognised as Eastleigh County Secondary School, Barton Peveril. In 1932 there was another move, this time to a building in Desborough Road that had previously been used for a school, with the move marked by the name Eastleigh County High School. In 1957, the school moved to its current site and returned its original name of Barton Peveril School.

The last intake to the state coeducational grammar school was in 1972. Since 1973, only sixth form students have been enrolled.

The current principal is Nicola Carcone, preceded by Rob Temple. Temple was preceded by Jonathan Prest who was principal from 2008 to 2022. Prest was preceded by Godfrey Glyn OBE who held the post from 1996 to 2008. Peter Happé was principal between 1980 and 1989.

== Campus ==
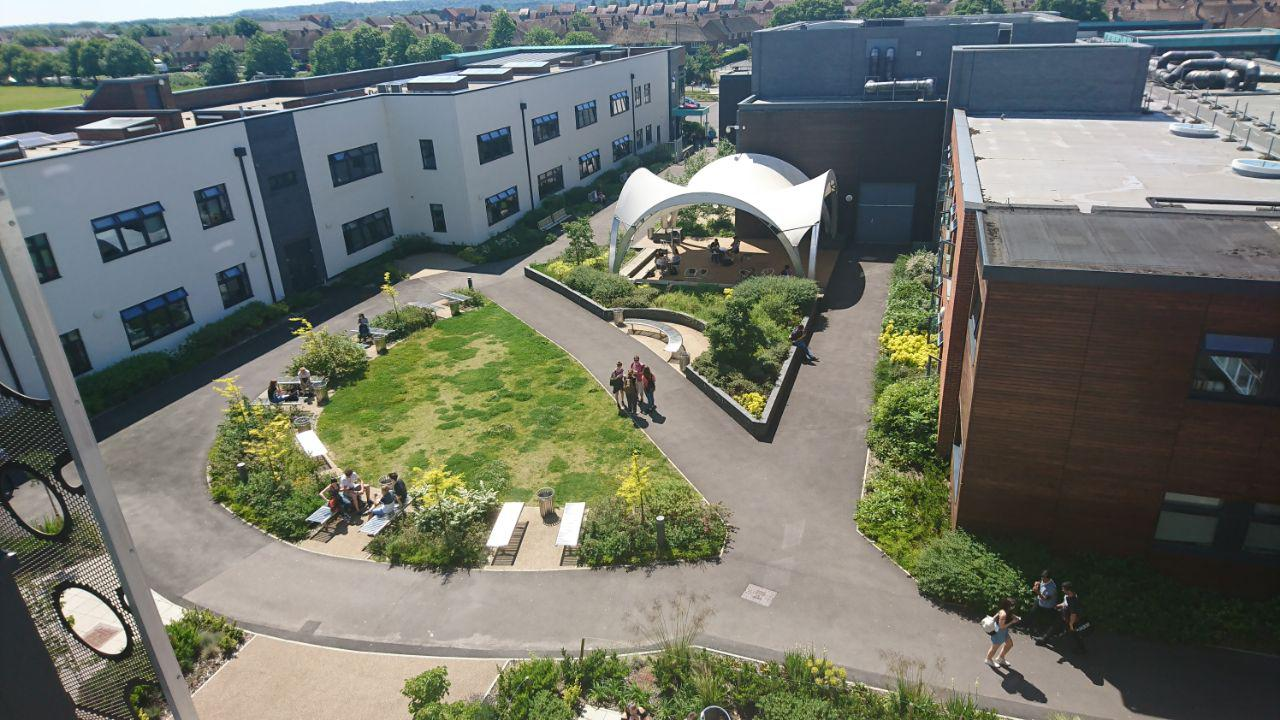
The Nobel Courtyard seen from the roof of the Science Centre

The campus, comprising six buildings and a library, is situated in the south of Hampshire. The Chestnut, Hampshire, Mountbatten, Nobel, Peveril, Rose, and Science Centre buildings each host a collection of the college’s academic qualifications.

The site is equidistant from Eastleigh and Southampton Airport Parkway railway stations, both of which are within walking distance.

In 2002 there was an £11.5 million building transformation project.

The Rose Building was constructed in 2006, at a cost of £7 million, to provide facilities for subjects including Sport, Media and the Performing Arts. Within this building is the Rose Theatre, which hosts a number of college and external events and productions.

The library underwent a £500,000 refurbishment in the summer of 2011, increasing the study space available and doubling the amount of computers. The library was renamed the Glyn Library, after previous Principal Godfrey Glyn OBE, and opened by the then Lord Lieutenant of Hampshire, Dame Mary Fagan.

In 2013 the Nobel Building was opened, offering facilities for Mathematics, Computer Science, Psychology, Criminology, Geography and Media; within this is a Media Studio and a Radio Studio.

The Science Centre was opened in 2015, costing £5 million. Each of the three floors is dedicated to a different scientific discipline: Chemistry, Biology, and Physics respectively. A £1.5 million extension to The Science Centre was opened in May 2019, which includes a new, dedicated Engineering lab.

== Curriculum ==
The college has over 60 A Level and Vocational courses available, alongside a programme of enrichment activities called Q-XTRA. The college focuses on preparing students for life after college, including Higher Education, Apprenticeships or Employment.

As of 2018, most students select three A Levels (or the equivalent in Vocational courses) with an enrichment option; this may include the Extended Project Qualification, a sport, performing art, volunteering, work experience, or a further experience or qualification.

In October 2002, the college was given Beacon Status, an award that "celebrates learning providers that deliver outstanding teaching and learning".

In June 2019, the college won the Sixth Form Colleges' Association Award for Independent Learning, for enabling students of all levels to work effectively and independently.

In January 2020, Barton Peveril was shortlisted for the Tes FE Award for the Outstanding Use of Technology for Improving Teaching, Learning and Assessment Award.

== Activities ==
In 2018, the college launched a new programme of enrichment activities called Q-XTRA, which offers students a comprehensive set of wider activities that allow for improvement in one of four areas: Health, Community, Skills, and Employability.

Multiple college productions take place throughout the year. Recent productions have included The Addams Family, Sister Act and a 1950s Immersive Theatre event where the college was transformed into an American High School from 1958.

Students can play Football, Hockey, Netball, Rugby, Basketball, Tennis and Badminton.

In 2019 Barton Peveril became Talented Athlete Scholarship Scheme (TASS) Accredited. The TASS Dual Career Accreditation Scheme, run by Sport England, ensures elite athletes can compete at the highest level whilst studying.

As well as the clubs and societies led by staff, students are encouraged to set up and run their own groups within the Q-XTRA programme. Examples of student run groups include the Pride Society, the Christian Union and the Debating Society. A competition entry by the latter was praised by the BBC partially because "every part of the college's entry was entirely down to the students themselves".

The Barton Peveril Jazz Ensemble won their section of the National Festival of Music for Youth in 2009. Other ensembles (open to all college students) include a choir, soul band, string group, wind ensemble and flute choir. Other extra-curricular performing arts opportunities include shows, for example in 2012 the musical West Side Story, and the annual Rock Challenge dance competition.

Barton Peveril students host a radio show every Wednesday from 2-3pm on Unity 101, from the start of the academic year in September until Easter.They became a hit success with their radio show featuring Lin Hughes hosted by Cameron and Eryk.

== Use of AI ==
=== AI Tools ===
Barton Peveril hosts AI tools created by Applied Data Science Partners. These include:

- Barton Buddy - a language model trained on data-sources chosen by the college. The model is not trained on the internet, and has been built with safeguards to prevent misuse.
- Barton AI - a custom-built Large Language Model. Every student can access the model.

These tools aim to aid students with their learning, instead of giving them the answers. The college aims to use AI to remove "paperwork pressure" from teachers, so that they can spend more time on student progress.

Chris Loveday, vice-principal for business services, emphasised in an interview that the college's use of AI tools "is not about reducing staff numbers but staff workload". This message has been "regularly disseminated" and "reinforced" among the staff because "people go through emotional cycles at different speeds".

As of February 2026, an Instagram account under the name @notobartonai claims to be a student-led campaign to limit the use of AI at Barton Peveril.

=== Partnership with Google ===
In 2024, Barton Peveril entered a partnership with Google and C-Learning to become the UK's first "Google Gemini Academy". This granted every teacher with a Gemini Pro licence. The concept of a Google Gemini Academy aims to provide state-of-the-art AI tools to both teachers and students. In March 2025, a corporation meeting including the governors and chairs of the college saw the consensus that "Google does have significant control over the college in some areas".

== Lockdown on 9th of March 2023 ==
On 9 March 2023 the campus was put into lockdown after there were reports that a group of armed people had been seen on site. Later, Hampshire Police Constabulary said that no injuries had been reported and no weapon had been located. On 10 March BBC news reported that three boys had been found with minor injuries.

== Alumni ==
- Chris Draper, Olympic sailor
- Tom Deacon, comedian
- Wade Elliott, footballer
- James Foad, rower: Men's eight 2012 Olympics bronze medallist
- Colin Firth, Oscar-Winning actor
- Dani King, cyclist: Women's team pursuit 2012 Olympics gold medallist and world record holder
- Kevin Latouf, cricketer
- Robbie Lee, diver
- David Nicholls, writer
- Elio Pace, musician
- Melanie Purkiss, athlete
- William Doyle, musician
- Kai Widdrington, choreographer and Strictly Come Dancing professional

=== Barton Peveril Grammar School ===
- Andrew Ball, pianist.
- David Campbell, clarinetist, 1964–71
- Rev Paul Flowers, former chairman of the Co-op bank
- Jane Parker-Smith (1950-2020), organist
- John Sweeney, BBC journalist
- Bill Woodrow, sculptor
