= Andrew Ball (pianist) =

British pianist (1950–2022)

- Born: 16 June 1950; Southampton, United Kingdom
- Died: 10 July 2022 (aged 72)
- Occupations: Classical pianist, music educator

Andrew Ball (16 June 1950 – 10 July 2022) was a British pianist. He was best known for his interpretations of Michael Tippett's piano sonatas, which he studied with the composer.

== Education ==
Ball was born in Southampton and was educated at Barton Peveril Grammar School in Eastleigh. One of his first appearances as a pianist was with the Havant Chamber Orchestra in 1966. He studied music at Queen’s College, Oxford and then at the Royal College of Music in London with Kendall Taylor, Maurice Cole and David Wilde.

== Performer ==
Ball made his professional debut in London on 4 June 1974 at the Wigmore Hall, playing Clementi, Schumann, Chopin, Debussy and Prokofiev. After studying the sonatas of Michael Tippett with the composer he frequently performed the works as a complete cycle. He also recorded the complete Tippett song cycles with the tenor Martyn Hill. Other works in his repertoire included Sofia Gubaidulina's Piano Sonata (British premiere at the Bath Festival in 1987) and Olivier Messiaen's Couleurs de la Cite Celeste at the BBC Proms in 1995. For BBC Radio he performed Ferruccio Busoni's Fantasia Contrappuntistica in 1988.

Ball played chamber music with the Villiers Quartet, the London Sinfonietta and the Nash Ensemble, and also for many years as a duo with violinist Madeleine Mitchell. There was also a partnership with the clarinettist David Campbell, an old school friend. His recordings include the piano music of Billy Mayerl, John Casken and (with Julian Jacobson) the two-piano music of Roberto Gerhard. With Detlef Hahn he recorded music for violin and piano by Korngold. His 2010 album Out of the Cool with flautist Susan Milan featured music by British composers, including Richard Rodney Bennett, Arthur Butterworth, David Heath, Cecilia McDowall and Robert Saxton.

== Teacher ==
As a teacher, Ball was initially on the staff at the Guildhall School of Music and Drama before becoming head of keyboard at the Royal College of Music between 1999 and 2005, where he was made a Fellow of the College in 2006 and subsequently stayed on as a professor of piano until 2021. He was also an adjudicator, and gave masterclasses in Germany, China, Japan and the USA. Teaching, rather than performing, became his primary focus after he was diagnosed with Parkinson's disease in 2012.
