= Thomas John Morgan =

Thomas John Morgan may refer to:

- Thomas J. Morgan (1847–1912), English-American labor leader
- T. J. Morgan (1907–1986), Welsh academic

== See also ==
- Thomas Morgan (disambiguation)
