= Morgans (surname) =

Morgans is a surname. Notable people with the surname include:

- Aimee Morgans, British engineer
- Alf Morgans (1850–1933), premier of Western Australia
- Kenny Morgans (1939–2012), Welsh association football player
- Gwyn Morgans (born 1932-2023), Welsh association football player
- Morgan Morgans (1806–1889), American politician
- Morgan Morgans (engineer) (1814–1888), Welsh civil engineer

== See also ==
- Morgans (disambiguation)
- Morgan (surname)
