= Jack Morgan =

Jack Morgan may refer to:

- J. P. Morgan Jr. (1867–1943), known as Jack, American banker, finance executive, and philanthropist
- Jack Morgan (footballer) (1920–2005), Australian rules footballer
- Jack Morgan (athlete) (1907–1967), New Zealand track and field athlete
- Jack M. Morgan (1924–2004), American politician
- Jack Morgan, a character in the British comedy series Look Around You played by Robert Popper
- Jac Morgan (born 2000), Welsh rugby union player
