= John H. Morgan =

John H. Morgan may refer to:

- John Hartman Morgan (1876–1955), British lawyer
- John Hunt Morgan (1825–1864), Confederate general during the American Civil War
- John Hamilton Morgan (1842–1894), American educator, politician and official of The Church of Jesus Christ of Latter-day Saints
- John H. Morgan (Mississippi), a state legislator in the 1870s

== See also ==
- John Morgan (disambiguation)
