= James H. Morgan =

James H. Morgan may refer to:

- James H. Morgan (Medal of Honor) (1840–1877), American Civil War Medal of Honor recipient
- James H. Morgan (politician), member of the California State Assembly 1861–1862
