= Further education =

Education beyond secondary schooling, typically used in the UK and Ireland

Further education (often abbreviated FE) in the United Kingdom and Ireland is additional education to that received at secondary school that is distinct from the higher education (HE) offered in universities and other academic institutions. It may be at any level in compulsory secondary education, from entry to higher level qualifications such as awards, certificates, diplomas and other vocational, competency-based qualifications (including those previously known as NVQ/SVQs) through awarding organisations including City and Guilds, Edexcel (BTEC) and Cambridge OCR. FE colleges may also offer HE qualifications such as HNC, HND, foundation degree or PGCE. The colleges are also a large service provider for apprenticeships where most of the training takes place at the apprentices' workplace, supplemented with day release into college.

FE in the United Kingdom is usually a means to attain an intermediate, advanced or follow-up qualification necessary to progress into HE, or to begin a specific career path outside of university education. Further Education is offered to students aged over 16 at colleges of Further Education, through work-based learning, or adult and community learning institutions.

== By country ==
=== United Kingdom ===
==== England ====
Provision for further education colleges was laid out in sections 41 to 47 of the Education Act 1944; their role was to offer "full-time and part-time education" and "leisure-time occupation" for persons over compulsory school age. In the 1960s, A-level students predominantly studied at school rather than colleges (often referred to as "techs" at that time). More types of colleges were introduced over the next decades, and by 1990 colleges took in almost half of A-level students.

Colleges in England are corporate bodies under the Further and Higher Education Act 1992, which removed further education colleges from local government control. Types of college include:

- General further education colleges
- Sixth form colleges
- Tertiary colleges
- Land-based colleges (e.g. agricultural specialisms)
- Specialist designated colleges
- Art, design and performing art colleges

Policies relating to colleges are primarily the responsibility of the Department for Education (DfE). Until July 2016, colleges were also covered by the Department for Business, Innovation and Skills (BIS); on the abolition of BIS and formation of the Department for Business, Energy and Industrial Strategy (BEIS), responsibility for FE colleges moved to DfE. The regulatory body for sixth form colleges was already DfE prior to the 2016 changes.

Following the merger of the Education Funding Agency and the Skills Funding Agency in 2017, funding for colleges is provided through the Education and Skills Funding Agency for all further education students. In 2018/19, colleges' income totalled £6.5 billion, of which £5.1 billion (78%) was public funding. Most college funding follows the learner. Colleges must attract students, competing with each other and with other types of education and training provider. Colleges can borrow commercially, own assets, employ staff and enter into contracts, and they may make financial surpluses or deficits.

The Technical and Further Education Act 2017 laid out a framework for an insolvency regime for further education colleges known as "Education Administration". This is a form of corporate administration adapted to the needs of further education, to be used "where a further education body is unable to pay its debts or is likely to become unable to pay its debts" and intended "to avoid or minimise disruption to the studies of the existing students of the further education body as a whole". Education administrators were appointed to run Hadlow College and West Kent College in 2019.

All colleges and FE providers are subject to inspection by Ofsted, which monitors the quality of provision in publicly funded institutions in England. Membership organisations for providers include the Association of Colleges and the Sixth Form Colleges' Association.

In 2020, the government allocated £200 million for repairs and upgrades of FE college buildings, subject to a degree of matched funding by the colleges, and the Department for Education is allocating this to colleges via the Further Education Capital Transformation Fund (FECTF). Sixteen colleges with sites in poor condition have been selected, and detailed proposals were invited for submission before October 2021, for projects which can be completed by December 2024.

==== Northern Ireland ====
Further education in Northern Ireland is provided through seven multi-campus colleges. Northern Ireland's Department for Employment and Learning has the responsibility for providing FE in the province.

- Belfast Metropolitan College
- North West Regional College
- Northern Regional College
- South Eastern Regional College
- South West College
- Southern Regional College

Most secondary schools also provide a sixth form scheme whereby a student can choose to attend for two additional years to complete their AS and A-levels.

==== Scotland ====
Scotland's further education colleges provide education for those young people who follow a vocational route after the end of compulsory education at age 16. They offer a wide range of vocational qualifications to young people and older adults, including vocational, competency-based qualifications (previously known as SVQs), Higher National Certificates and Higher National Diplomas. Frequently, the first two years of higher education – usually in the form of an HND – are taken in an FE college, followed by attendance at university.

==== Wales ====
Further education in Wales is provided through:

- Sixth form colleges
- FE colleges
- Sixth forms within secondary schools

Further education in Wales comes under the remit of the Welsh Government. Funding came from Education and Learning Wales from 2000 until 2006, when that organisation was merged with the Assembly.

=== Republic of Ireland ===
Further education in the Republic of Ireland is similar to that offered in the UK. Typical areas include apprenticeships and other vocational qualifications in many disciplines, such as childcare, farming, retail, and tourism. The many types of further education awards are known as Post Leaving Certificates.

Further education has expanded immensely in recent years, helped by the institutions and their relationships with their communities. Quality and Qualifications Ireland (QQI), which was established in November 2012, is the regulator for FE qualifications. Further education and higher education have been linked through tertiary programmes, in which students begin in further education before progressing to higher education to complete an accredited degree. The National Tertiary Office, established within the Higher Education Authority and jointly managed with SOLAS, supports the development of these pathways.

== See also ==
=== United Kingdom ===
- Jisc
- National Union of Students of the United Kingdom
- Workers' Educational Association

=== Elsewhere ===
- List of education articles by country
- Community colleges in the United States
- European Qualifications Framework
- Technical and further education (Australia)

=== Topics ===
- Art school
- International Standard Classification of Education
- Learning environment
- Learning space
- Workplace bullying in academia
