= Michael Morgan =

Michael or Mike Morgan may refer to:

== Music ==
- Michael Morgan (conductor) (1957–2021), American conductor
- Mike Morgan (musician) (born 1959), American Texas blues musician, frontman of Mike Morgan and the Crawl
- Mike Morgan (producer) (fl. 2010s), Australian music producer and engineer
- Mike Morgan (songwriter) (born 1948), American singer-songwriter and music producer

== Politics ==
- Michael Morgan (American politician) (fl. 2020s), from Vermont
- Mike Morgan (politician) (born 1955), U.S. politician from Oklahoma
- Michael Hamilton Morgan (born 1951), American political scientist

== Sports ==
=== American football ===
- Mike Morgan (linebacker, born 1942) (1942–1996), American football linebacker
- Mike Morgan (linebacker, born 1988), American football linebacker
- Mike Morgan (running back) (born 1956), American football running back

=== Cricket ===
- Michael Morgan (cricketer, born 1932) (1932–2017), English cricketer and medical doctor
- Michael Morgan (cricketer, born 1936) (1936–2023), English cricketer
- Michael Morgan (cricketer, born 1952), Scottish-born former English cricketer

=== Rugby league ===
- Michael Morgan (rugby league, born 1991), Australian rugby league player
- Michael Morgan (rugby league, born 1995), Australian-Irish rugby league footballer
- Mick Morgan (born 1948), English rugby league footballer

=== Other sports ===
- Michael Morgan (bobsleigh) (born 1961), Jamaica Olympic bobsledder
- Michael Morgan (rower) (born 1946), Australian rower
- Mike Morgan (baseball) (born 1959), American baseball player
- Mike Morgan (boxer) (fl. 1970s), American boxer
- Mike Morgan (sportscaster) (fl. 2000s–2010s), American sportscaster

== Others ==
- Michael L. Morgan (born 1944), American philosopher
- Michael Ryan Morgan (1833–1911), soldier
- Michael R. Morgan (born 1955), American judge
- Michael K. Morgan (born 1956), Australian neurosurgeon
- Michael J. Morgan (born 1942), British psychologist
- Mike Morgan (meteorologist) (born 1963), American television meteorologist for KFOR-TV in Oklahoma City, Oklahoma
- Mike Morgan (actor) (1929–1958), British actor
