= New York State Hospital Commission =

The New York State Hospital Commission is a subdivision of the New York State Department of Health. It was called the State Commission in Lunacy from 1895 to 1912.

== History ==
In 1894, New York State adopted the New York State Constitution. It took effect on January 1, 1895. It created a State Commission in Lunacy having "exclusive jurisdiction over all institutions for the care and treatment of the insane, epileptics and idiots".

By the provisions of chapter 121 of the Laws of 1912, the State Commission in Lunacy was designated the State Hospital Commission. The commission consisted of three commissioners appointed by the governor of New York for terms of six years, with the exception of the New York State medical commissioner, who served based on his "good behavior".

Every private institution for the insane had to be issued a license from the commission. By chapter 32 of the Laws of 1909, the commission was given supervision over the expenditures of all New York State hospitals for the insane: "no disbursements for any purpose can be made by these institutions except upon quarterly estimates, which must be submitted to the Commission for revision and approval. All vouchers for the maintenance and building improvements account of the State hospitals are paid through the office of the Commission."

There was also a Bureau of Deportation which acted under the direction of the commission to return nonresident insane persons to their place of origin.

== Members ==
- Everett S. Elwood
- Albert Warren Ferris, president September 23, 1907 – December 27, 1911
- Carlos Frederick MacDonald, chairman 1880–1896
- Frederick A. Higgins
- James V. May, president December 30, 1911 – ?
- Harriet May Mills, the first woman in the commission
- Andrew D. Morgan, chairman 1914–1921
- William Cary Sanger 1911 to 1913.
