= Albert Warren Ferris =

American psychiatrist (1856–1937)

Albert Warren Ferris (December 3, 1856 – October 4, 1937) was an American psychiatrist, born in Brooklyn, New York.

== Education and family life ==
Ferris received his A.B from the University of the City of New York, now New York University, in 1878, his A.M. in 1885 from the same institution and his M.D. from the College of Physicians and Surgeons (Columbia University) in 1882.

He married Juliet A. Gavette in New York City in 1897.

== Career ==
Ferris' occupations were in the State of New York. In 1892, he set up practice in New York City. He was a consulting physician to the Italian Hospital, New York, and to the Binghamton State Hospital. From September 23, 1907 to December 27, 1911 he was president of the New York State Commission in Lunacy. He was also president of the Schuyler County Medical Society, and an associate editor of the New York State Journal of Medicine. He was also the director of the Saratoga Springs (New York) State Reservation Commission from 1913 to 1916.

His biography intThe Home Medical Library states that he was a "Former Assistant in Neurology, Columbia University; Former Chairman, Section on Neurology and Psychiatry, New York Academy of Medicine; Assistant in Medicine, University and Bellvue Hospital Medical College; Medical Editor, New International Encyclopedia."
