= Bronant =

Hamlet in Ceredigion, Wales

Coordinates: 52.285°N 3.994°W

Bronant is a hamlet in the county of Ceredigion, mid Wales. It lies on the A485 road which runs north from Tregaron to Llanilar and falls within the community of Lledrod. The Cors Caron national nature reserve lies three miles to the southeast. Also of note is the Roman road of Sarn Helen which passes to the east of the hamlet. It is known to geologists as it gives its name to the Bronnant Fault.

== History ==
Interestingly, the hamlet holds a unique place in canine history. Records indicate that up until about 1870, the Bronant was so isolated to the point that the Cardiganshire Welsh Corgi lived almost entirely undisturbed. The name "Bronant" means "the hillside brook".

== Notable people ==
- David Owen Morgan FRSE (1893-1959) parasitologist and cell biologist born and raised here.
