= Edwin Morgan =

Edwin Morgan may refer to:

- Edwin Morgan (poet) (1920–2010), Scottish poet
- Edwin B. Morgan (1806–1881), U.S. Representative from New York
- Edwin D. Morgan (1811–1883), New York governor and U.S. Senator
- Edwin D. Morgan (businessman) (1921–2001), American director of the Pioneer Fund
- Edwin D. Morgan III (1854–1933), American yachtsman
- Edwin Vernon Morgan (1865–1934), American diplomat and ambassador

== See also ==
- Edward Morgan (disambiguation)
