= Wessex Group of Sixth Form Colleges =

Association of eleven sixth form colleges

The Wessex Group is an association of eleven sixth form colleges.

== History ==
The partnership was formed in 1997, under the name the Hampshire Sixth Form Colleges' Partnership. The name was changed to reflect the membership of Southampton and Portsmouth colleges, which are not in the Hampshire County Council area.

== Members ==
The membership of the Group is:

- Alton College
- Barton Peveril College
- Sixth Form College, Farnborough
- Havant College
- Itchen College
- Peter Symonds College
- Portsmouth College
- Queen Mary's College
- St Vincent College
- Taunton's College
- Totton College
