= Henry Morgan (disambiguation) =

Sir Henry Morgan (c. 1635 – 1688) was a Welsh privateer and Admiral of Caribbean Fleet; Lieutenant Governor of Jamaica 1675–83.

Henry Morgan may also refer to:

== Clergymen ==
- Henry Morgan (bishop) (before 1500–1559), Welsh lawyer and last Roman Catholic Bishop of St David's
- Henry Morgan (minister) (1825–1884), American author and Methodist pastor in Boston
- Henry Morgan (academic) (1830–1912), English academic ordained in 1859
- Henry Morgan (priest) (1871–1947), Welsh Archdeacon of Bangor

== Public officials ==
- Henry Morgan (of Llandaff) (before 1580–1632), Welsh member of House of Commons in 1601
- Henry Morgan-Clifford (1806–1884), English Liberal Party Member of Parliament
- Henry James Morgan (1842–1913), Canadian civil servant, historian and editor
- Henry A. Morgan (1861–1942), Arizona pioneer, merchant, first mayor of Willcox, Arizona
- Henry Sturgis Morgan Jr. (1924–2011), American lawyer and rear admiral
- Henry Coke Morgan Jr. (1935–2022), American federal judge for Eastern District of Virginia

== Others ==
- Henry Sturgis Morgan (1900–1982), American banker and co-founder of Morgan Stanley
- Henry Morgan (actor) (1915–2011), American film and TV performer whose stage name became Harry Morgan in 1956
- Henry Morgan (cricketer) (1907–1987), Irish first-class cricketer
- Henry Morgan (humorist) (1915–1994), American radio and television personality
- Henry Morgan (merchant) (1819–1893), Scottish-Canadian (Quebec) department store tycoon
- Henry Morgan (rugby union), Welsh international rugby union player

== See also ==
- Harry Morgan (disambiguation)
