= Paul Morgan =

Paul Morgan may refer to:

- Paul Morgan (engineer) (1948–2001), British engineer
- Paul Morgan (footballer) (born 1978), Northern Irish association footballer
- Paul Morgan (journalist), British sports journalist
- Paul Morgan (rugby league, died 2001) (c. 1947–2001), Australian rugby league footballer and administrator
- Paul Morgan (rugby, born 1974) (1974–2015), Welsh rugby union and rugby league footballer of the 1990s and 2000s
- Paul Morgan (priest) (born 1964), superior of the British district of the Society of St Pius X
- Paul Morgan (actor) (1886–1938), Austrian actor and Kabarett performer
- Paul Morgan (judge) (born 1952), judge of the High Court of England and Wales
