= Peter Morgan (disambiguation) =

Peter Morgan (born 1963) is a British screenwriter and dramatist.

Peter Morgan may also refer to:

- Peter G. Morgan (politician) (1817–1890), African-American shoemaker and politician in Virginia
- Peter Morgan (automaker) (1919–2003), British sports car manufacturer
- Peter Morgan (sport shooter) (1927–2009), British Olympic shooter
- Pete Morgan (1939–2010), British poet, author and presenter
- Peter Morgan (footballer) (born 1951), Welsh footballer
- Peter Morgan (rugby union) (1959–2024), Wales and British Lions rugby union international
- P. G. Morgan, British TV producer and writer
- Peter Morgan (producer), American film producer known for American Sniper and Identity Thief
- Peter Morgan (cricketer) (born 1972), South African cricketer

== See also ==
- Morgan (surname)
