= Morgans =

Morgans can refer to:

- Morgans (surname), people with the surname
- Morgans, alternative rendering of Mokens or Morgan sea gypsies
- Morgans, alternative rendering of Morgens, Welsh water sprites
- Morgan's, defunct Canadian department store chain
