= Susan Milan =

English musical artist (born 1947)

- Born: 3 September 1947 (age 79); London, England
- Education: Royal College of Music
- Occupation: Flute professor

Susan Milan ARCM PG, GSMD, FRCM (/mɪˈlæn/ mil-AN; born 3 September 1947) is an English professor of flute of the Royal College of Music, classical performer, recording artiste, composer, author and entrepreneur.

== Biography ==
Susan Milan was born in London, the daughter of civil servants. Between 1958 and 1963, she became a Junior Exhibitioner at the Royal College of Music. During 1960 to 1966, she was a member of the London Schools Symphony Orchestra. From 1963 to 1967, she was a scholar of the Royal College of Music, graduating with honours, where she became a professor of Flute in 1984. From 1966 to 1972, she attended Marcel Moyse master classes in Boswil.

In 1967, she was awarded a Countess of Munster Scholarship to study as a Post Graduate under Geoffrey Gilbert at the Guildhall School of Music. After graduation in 1968, she was invited to become Principal Flute of the Bournemouth Sinfonietta. In 1974, she made musical history by being appointed the first woman principal and member of the Royal Philharmonic Orchestra where she remained for eight years. Since then she has sustained a multi-dimensional career as an orchestral guest principal, chamber musician, soloist, recording artiste, composer, author, teacher, lecturer and entrepreneur.

In 2001, she was appointed Artistic Director of Woodwind for the Evergreen Orchestra, Taiwan. In 2007, she was appointed Adjunct Professor of Music at Henan University, China, and founded the British Isles Music Festival in Charterhouse School for outstanding young musicians.

== Activities ==
In 1979, Milan released her first solo recording on the ASV label. This was followed in 1981 by a second solo recording on the Hyperion label, and contracts with Chandos (1990) and Upbeat (1990). 1997 saw the issue of the Master Classics Archive Series of historic flute recordings featuring Milan. Described as the "Queen of the Flute" by journalist Huang Hua, Milan has recorded concertos, duos and chamber music recitals for the Hyperion, Da Capo, Omega, Cala, Metier and ASV labels. She has further recorded more than a dozen recordings of concertos and recitals for the Chandos label including three collections of French repertoire. She has also made recital recordings of French Impressionist composers (Saint-Saëns, Debussy, Lili Boulanger, Ibert, Dutilleux, Poulenc and Feld) for Upbeat Records and Master Classics.

Her most recent recording of contemporary British works for flute and piano, with the pianist Andrew Ball, was released on the Metier label in 2008. She has also recorded the Schmidt Concerto by Ole Schmidt with Schmidt conducting, for the Da Capo label. In 2010, she began recording the Simpson Concerto for Hyperion.

Recent commissions have included a concerto from the American composer Keith Gates, "Oiseau Soleil" for flute and piano by the French composer Jean Sichler, "The Moon Dances" by the British composer Cecilia McDowall, "Sonata" by British composer Brian Lock and "Octagon" by British composer Ian Finney. Her accompanist, pianist Ian Brown has worked with Schering, Rostropovich, Galway and other famous classical musicians.

== Performances ==
In the UK, Milan has performed as a Principal Flute and soloist with all the major orchestras including the Royal Philharmonic Orchestra, London Philharmonic Orchestra, London Symphony Orchestra, Academy of St. Martin in the Fields, English Chamber Orchestra, City of London Sinfonia, English String Orchestra, Scottish Chamber Orchestra, BBC Scottish Orchestra, BBC Philharmonic Orchestra, BBC Welsh Orchestra, Philomusica of London, New London Orchestra and Haydn Festival Orchestra. In her a career as an orchestral guest principal, chamber musician, soloist, teacher and lecturer, she has often featured on the BBC. She has given numerous UK and world premieres, touring frequently throughout Europe, US, Australia and the Far East.

== Repertoire ==
Milan performs repertoire from the Baroque, classical, romantic, impressionist, and contemporary periods. As well as a wide repertoire of recital and chamber music, she performs solo works by J. S. Bach, Hofmann, Khatchaturian, Mozart, Saint-Saëns and Vivaldi, with orchestra, as well as works by C. P. E. Bach, Carl Nielsen, Ibert, Jolivet, Reinecke, Stamitz and Telemann.

== Ensembles ==
In the chamber music field, she formed The London Chamber Music Group (featuring flute, oboe, violin, viola, cello, piano and harp). With members of the group, she recorded the chamber music of Eugene Goossens for the Chandos label. She has also performed with The Debussy Ensemble, Weber Ensemble and Milan-Ball Duo. Susan formed the Milan Trio, with her second son, cellist Christopher Jepson, and the pianist Andrew Ball, and performs with the Instrumental Quintet of London, for flute, string trio and harp, with Nicholas ward, Matthew Jones, Sebastian Somberti and Ieuan Jones.

== Accomplishments ==
In 1992, Milan researched and published 19th century repertoire for Boosey & Hawkes. Several technical books followed including two technical scale books in 2000, and a handbook of programme notes, for flute performers in 2006. She is presently restoring a collection of historic [78"] recordings of flautists from 1910 to 1945, to be issued on the Master Classics label.

In 1960, she was presented with the Royal College of Music's Evekisch Prize by Sir Malcolm Sargent. In recognition of her achievements, she was elected President of the British Flute Society in 1990 until 1995. She was awarded a Fellowship of the Royal College in November 1999 which was presented to her by HRH Prince Charles. Milan is listed in the New Grove Dictionary of Music and Who's Who in Music, and is a Patron of GAMPA, BASBWE and the Association of Woodwind Teachers.

== Recordings ==
Featuring Susan Milan

- "Recital" – Prokofiev; Dutilleux; Saint-Saëns; Ibert; Bozza; Susan Milan & Clifford Benson. Master Classics, 1982.
- "Suite For Flute and Strings in A Minor, Concerto for Flute, Violin, Cello and Strings in A Minor" – Georg Philipp Telemann; Susan Milan with Camerata of St Andrew, Directed by Leonard Friedman. Omega, 1987.
- "Concertos in D Major and G Major, Andante in C, Rondo in C" – Wolfgang Amadeus Mozart; Susan Milan with English Chamber Orchestra, Conductor: Raymond Leppard. Chandos, 1988.
- “Flute Fantaisie” (French Concours Pieces) – Faure, Grovlez, Ganne, Busser, Gaubert; Susan Milan & Ian Brown. Chandos, 1988.
- “Major Works for Flute and Piano” – Schubert, Martinu, Reinecke; Susan Milan & Ian Brown. Chandos, 1990.
- “La Flute Enchantee” (French Concertos & Solos) – Ibert, Martin, Jolivet, Godard, Chaminade, Saint-Saëns; City Of London Sinfonia, Conductor: Richard Hickox. Chandos, 1990.
- “Complete Works For Flute and Piano Of Philippe Gaubert” – Philippe Gaubert; Susan Milan & Ian Brown. Chandos, 1991.
- “Quartets For Flute and Strings” – Wolfgang Amadeus Mozart; Susan Milan with The Chilingirian Quartet. Chandos, 1991.
- “Mozart Flute and Harp Concerto”, “Salieri Flute And Oboe Concerto” – Mozart, Salieri; City Of London Sinfonia, Conductor: Richard Hickox Chandos, 1992.
- “Beethoven Serenade and Trio” – Beethoven; Members of the Chilingirian String Quartet. Chandos, 1992.
- “Tarantella” – Saint-Saëns; London Philharmonic Orchestra, Conductor: Geoffrey Simon. Carla, 1993.
- “Concerto ‘Il Gardellino’”, R.V. 428 – Antonio Vivaldi; Lucerne Festival Strings, Conductor: Rudolf Baumgartner. Denon, 1995.
- “Recital”, Opus 1 – Feld, Boulanger, Rutter, Sichler, Messiaen, Poulenc, Debussy, Saint-Saëns; Susan Milan & Ian Brown. Upbeat/Master Classics, 1995.
- “Flute Concert” – Ole Schmidt; Manchester String Ensemble, Conductor: Ole Schmidt. Da Capo, 1996.
- “Chamber Music Of Eugene Goossens” – Eugene Goossens; Susan Milan with London Chamber Music Group. Chandos, 2004.
- “Out Of The Cool” (Living British Composers) – Rodney Bennett, McDowall, Heath, Lock, Butterworth, Saxton; Susan Milan & Andrew Ball. Metier, 2009.
- "Terzetti" – The Debussy Ensemble; Susan Milan, Matthew Jones, Ieuan Jones. Divine Art, 2012.

Arrangements

- “Flute Archive Series 1: 1910–1945”, Performed by Rene Le Roy, Georges Barrère, Marcel Moyse. Master Classics, 1997.
- “Flute Archive Series 2: 1910 -1945”, Performed by Clement Barone, Albert Fransella, John Lemmoné, John Amadio. Master Classics, 1997.

== Premieres ==
- 1972 “Kavitta 2” – N. Sohal; South Bank Centre, London, England; Susan Milan flute, Jane Manning soprano.
- 1970 “Reflections For Solo Flute (After Debussy)” – P. Lamb; Russell Cotes Art Gallery & Museum, Bournemouth, England; Susan Milan flute.
- 1973 “Krystallen Solo Flute” – R. Saxton; Purcell Room, London, England; Susan Milan flute, Clifford Benson piano.
- 1974 “Fantasy Sonata” – D. Morgan; Purcell Room, London, England; Susan Milan flute, Clifford Benson piano.
- 1975 “Concerto” – J. Feld; The Round, London, England; Royal Philharmonic Orchestra.
- 1981 “Sonata Per Assisi” – A. Dorati; Respighi Festival, Assisi, Italy; Susan Milan & Maxence Larrieu flutes.
- 1981 “Six Tunes For The Instruction Of Singing Birds” – Richard Rodney Bennett; Norwich Festival, England; Susan Milan flute.
- 1983 “Memento” – Richard Rodney Bennett; Windsor Festival, England; London Philharmonic Orchestra.
- 1984 “Concerto” – Ole Schmidt; Aarhus Symphony Hall, Denmark; Aarhus Symphony Orchestra, Conductor: Ole Schmidt.
- 1987 “Serenade” – R. Walker; Queen Elizabeth Hall, London, England; Instrumental Quintet of London.
- 1989 “Flute Fantasy” – Carl Davis; Chichester Festival, England; Academy of St Martin in the Fields, Conductor: Carl Davis.
- 1991 “Concerto” – R. Simpson; Malvern Festival, England; City of London Sinfonia, Conductor: Richard Hickox.
- 1992 “Stardrift” – E. Roxburgh; Royal College Of Music, London, England; Solo flute.
- 1995 “Quintetto Capriccioso” – J. Feld; Queen Elizabeth Hall, London, England; Instrumental Quintet of London.
- 1997 “Night Owls” – E. Cowie; Benaroya Hall, Seattle, US; Susan Milan flute, Ian Brown piano.
- 1999 “Concerto” – Keith Gates; City Hall, Lake Charles, Louisiana, US; Lake Charles Symphony Orchestra.
- 2001 “Concerto” – Roger Steptoe; St. John’s Smith Square, Barbican, London, England; New London Orchestra, Conductor: Ronald Corp.
- 2003 “Moon Dances” – Cecilia McDowell; Wigmore Hall, London, England; Susan Milan flute, Ian Brown piano.
- 2003 “Moon Dances” – Cecilia McDowell; Ticino Festival, Lugano, Switzerland; Susan Milan flute, Ian Brown piano.
- 2003, “Three Pictures” – Goosens, Prokofiev, McDowall; Wigmore Hall, London, England; Susan Milan & Ian Brown. Conductor: Taktakishvilli.
- 2004 “Sonata” – Brian Lock; Seoul Arts Centre, Seoul, South Korea; Susan Milan flute, Ian Brown piano.
- 2008 “Octagon” – Ian Finney; The Octagon, Green College, Oxford, England; Susan Milan flute.
- 2009 “Two Triptychs” – Jacob Thompson; Purcell Room, London, England; Debussy Ensemble.

== Publications ==
- Susan Milan, Quadruplets Book 1: Scale Books For The Instruction Of Students. Master Classics, 2000
- Susan Milan, Triplets & Sextuplets Book 2: Scale Books For The Instruction Of Students. Master Classics, 2006
- Susan Milan, Flute Notes: A Performers Handbook of Programme Notes for the flute repertoire (148 composers and over 400 works). Researched, written and revised by Susan Milan. Master Classics (1st ed.) 2006 / Master Classics 2010 (2nd ed.)
- Franz Schubert, Three Sonatinas, Opus 137, Edited by Susan Milan, Boosey & Hawkes, 1993
- Carl Reinecke, The “Undine” Sonata, Opus 167. Researched & edited by Susan Milan, Boosey & Hawkes, 1991
- John Francis Barnett, The Grand Sonata, Opus 41. Researched & edited by Susan Milan, Boosey & Hawkes, 1993
- Sergei Rachmaninov, Vocalise, Opus 34, Number 14. Edited by Susan Milan, Boosey & Hawkes, 2000
- Edward German, Romance and Intermezzo. Researched & edited by Susan Milan, Boosey & Hawkes, 1991
- Susan Milan, Cadenzas for Mozart Concertos Number 1 and 2, and Andante in C. Composed by Susan Milan, Emerson Edition 1988
- Wilhelm Popp, Sonatine, Opus 388, Number 1. Researched & edited, Hunt Edition, 1995
- Sergei Rachmaninov, Apres Une Reve. Edited by Susan Milan, Boosey & Hawkes
