= Judge Morgan =

Judge Morgan may refer to:

- Declan Morgan (1951- ), a retired judge from Northern Ireland
- Henry Coke Morgan Jr. (1935–2022), judge of the United States District Court for the Eastern District of Virginia
- John T. Morgan (judge) (c. 1830–1910), justice of the Idaho Territorial Supreme Court
- Justin C. Morgan (1900–1959), judge of the United States District Court for the Western District of New York
- Lewis Render Morgan (1913–2001), judge of the United States Courts of Appeals for the Fifth and Eleventh Circuits
- Mary C. Morgan (fl. 1960s–2020s), judge of the San Francisco County Superior Court
- Richard Morgan (Tudor judge) (died 1556), Welsh judge of the mid-Tudor period
- Robert Dale Morgan (1912–2002), judge of the United States District Courts for the Central and Southern Districts of Illinois
- Sarah Morgan (judge) (fl. 1980s–2020s), British High Court judge
- Susie Morgan (born 1953), judge of the United States District Court for the Eastern District of Louisiana

== See also ==
- Justice Morgan (disambiguation)
