= Michelle Morgan =

Michelle Morgan may refer to:

- Michelle Morgan (actress) (born 1981), Canadian film and television actress
- Michele Morgan (actress) (born 1970), American film, television and voice-over actress
- Michelle Morgan (athletic administrator) (born 1983), American ice hockey administrator
- Michele Morgan (1957–1961), child murder victim
- Michèle Morgan (1920–2016), French film actress
