= Erich Gruenberg =

British violinist (1924–2020)

Erich Gruenberg OBE
- Born: 12 October 1924; Vienna, First Austrian Republic
- Died: 7 August 2020 (aged 95); Hampstead Garden Suburb, England
- Education: Jerusalem Conservatory
- Occupations: Classical violinist; Academic teacher
- Organizations: Stockholm Philharmonic Orchestra; London Symphony Orchestra; Royal Philharmonic Orchestra; Royal Academy of Music

Erich Gruenberg OBE (12 October 1924 – 7 August 2020) was an Austrian-born British violinist and teacher. Following studies in Israel, he was a principal violinist of major orchestras, including the Royal Stockholm Philharmonic Orchestra, the London Symphony Orchestra and the Royal Philharmonic Orchestra. He was an international soloist, playing the first performance of Britten's Violin Concerto in Moscow. As a chamber musician, he was leader of the London String Quartet and recorded all Beethoven violin sonatas with pianist David Wilde. He was the lead violinist for The Beatles' album, Sgt. Pepper's Lonely Hearts Club Band. Gruenberg taught at the Royal Academy of Music until age 95, influencing generations of violinists.

== Life and career ==
Gruenberg was born in Vienna in 1924, the son of Kathrine and Herman Gruenberg. He moved to Mandatory Palestine in 1938, where he studied at the Jerusalem Conservatory. After graduating in 1941, he became a concertmaster of the Palestine Broadcasting Corporation Orchestra. In 1946, he moved to London where he lived until his death, becoming a British subject in 1950. In 1947 he won the Carl Flesch International Violin Competition, which at the time came with no monetary prize but international recognition. Gruenberg appeared as a soloist in many countries. He gave the first Russian performance of Benjamin Britten's Violin Concerto, in Moscow. His first concert at the Proms was on 10 August 1955, when he played Bach's Concerto in D minor for two violins, BWV 1043, with Manoug Parikian. He made subsequent performances as a soloist at the Proms in 1961, 1964, 1969, 1970, 1971, 1973, 1975, 1978, and 1982. In a concert at the Proms on 11 August 1971, he played Beethoven's Violin Concerto at the Royal Albert Hall, with the BBC Orchestra conducted by Adrian Boult. In a concert on 24 August 1982, he played the Proms premiere of Alfred Schnittke's Violin Concerto No. 3, conducted by Edward Downes.

He was concertmaster of the Stockholm Philharmonic Orchestra from 1955, the London Symphony Orchestra from 1962 to 1965, and the Royal Philharmonic Orchestra from 1972 to 1975. In addition, he was first violin with the London String Quartet (a later ensemble than the London Quartet), and he played chamber music on numerous occasions. Gruenberg taught at the Guildhall School of Music and Drama from 1982 and at the Royal Academy of Music in London from 1989, continuing to teach to age 95. He participated as an international music competition juror many times.

Gruenberg made numerous recordings, including Beethoven's Violin Concerto with the Philharmonia Orchestra and Beethoven's complete violin sonatas with pianist David Wilde. He also played contemporary music such as works by Roberto Gerhard, Berthold Goldschmidt and Olivier Messiaen. In 1976, he played the first recording of David Morgan's 1966 Violin Concerto with the Royal Philharmonic Orchestra conducted by Vernon Handley.

Gruenberg also played on several recordings by The Beatles, including as the lead violinist for their iconic 1967 album, Sgt. Pepper's Lonely Hearts Club Band, on the songs "A Day in the Life", "She's Leaving Home" and "Within You Without You". The group whimsically had him play wearing a prop gorilla paw on his bow hand.

Gruenberg was made an OBE in 1994. He played a Stradivarius violin, dated 1731.

Gruenberg died in Hampstead Garden Suburb on 7 August 2020 at age 95. Jo Cole, head of strings at the Royal Academy, wrote in a tribute:

... a giant of the violin who made such an enormous contribution to the music profession as a performer, and to the generations of violinists who had the privilege of studying under his guidance at the Royal Academy of Music.
