= Unity 101 =

Community radio station in Southampton, England

Coordinates: 50°54′58.40″N 1°25′2.01″W

Unity101

England
- Broadcast area: South Hampshire
- Frequency: 101.1 MHz FM

Programming
- Format: Community Radio

Ownership
- Owner: Cultural Media Enterprise Limited (Ram Kalyan "Kelly")

Links
- Website: http://www.unity101.org/

Unity 101 (previously known as Unity 24) is a community radio station based in Southampton, England, a voluntary organisation catering to the Asian and ethnic minority communities in the area. The station was previously only on the air for one month a year, but on 8 December 2005 began a five-year licence to broadcast permanently.

The show's weekday lineup consists predominantly of Indian music in Hindi, Gujarati, Punjabi and English, with a 'Community Hour' of discussion from 3pm to 4pm. On the weekends the station hosts music and other forms of culture (such as literature) from a greater variety of ethnicities, currently including Chinese, Afghani, Polish and music of black origin. On weekdays between 2pm and 3pm the station hosts radio shows from local colleges, Taunton's College, Southampton City College, Regent's Park College, Barton Peveril College and Totton College
