= Richard Morgan =

Richard Morgan may refer to:

- Sir Richard Morgan (Tudor judge) (died 1556), MP for Gloucester, 1545–53; Chief Justice of the Common Pleas, 1553–55
- Richard Morgan (MP) (fl. 1593), Member of Parliament (MP) for Montgomery Boroughs
- Richard Hillebrand Morgan, Sri Lankan Burgher lawyer
- Richard Williams Morgan (c. 1815–1889), Welsh clergyman and author
- Richard Morgan (Ceylonese judge) (fl. 1874), Ceylonese Chief Justice
- Dick Thompson Morgan (1853–1920), U.S. Representative from Oklahoma
- Richard Morgan (actor) (1958–2006), Australian actor
- Richie Morgan (born 1946), Welsh footballer and manager
- Richard K. Morgan (born 1965), British science fiction author
- Richard Morgan (cricketer) (born 1972), New Zealand cricketer
- Richard E. Morgan (1937–2014), American conservative author of non-fiction
- Richard T. Morgan (1952–2018), American politician from North Carolina
- Richard Morgan, winning driver of the Formula Ford Festival auto race in 1974

== Characters ==
- Richard Morgan, character from the 2002 film The Ring
- Richard Morgan, main character in the historical novel, Morgan's Run
