= Steve Morgan =

Steve Morgan or Stephen Morgan may refer to:

- Stephen Morgan (meteorologist), television host, anchor and weatherman working for Fox Weather
- Steve Morgan (businessman) (born 1952), English businessman and chairman of Wolverhampton Wanderers F.C.
- Steve Morgan (footballer, born 1968), English footballer
- Steve Morgan (footballer, born 1970), Welsh footballer
- Stephen Morgan (American politician) (1854–1928), U.S. Representative from Ohio
- Stephen Morgan (British politician) (born 1981), British Member of Parliament for Portsmouth South
- Stephen L. Morgan (born 1971), professor of sociology and education
