= Kevin Morgan =

Kevin Morgan may refer to:

- Kevin Morgan (politician) (1921–2003), Australian politician
- Kevin Morgan (cyclist) (born 1948), Australian Olympic cyclist
- Kevin Morgan (baseball) (born 1969), former Major League Baseball player and current executive
- Kevin Morgan (rugby union) (born 1977), Welsh rugby union player
