= Jason Morgan =

Jason Morgan is the name of:

- W. Jason Morgan (1935–2023), American geophysicist
- Jason Morgan (ice hockey) (born 1976), Canadian ice hockey player
- Jason Morgan (discus thrower) (born 1982), Jamaican discus thrower
- Jason Morgan (politician) (born 1989), American politician
- Jason Morgan (General Hospital), a fictional character on the American soap opera General Hospital
