= Morgan Morgans (engineer) =

Welsh civil engineer (1814–1888)

Morgan Morgans (1814–1888) was a civil engineer particularly involved with mining.

Morgans was born in Llanddeusant, Carmarthenshire in either 1814 or 1816. He worked in connection with Ebbw Vale Ironworks from about 1840.

The 1851 Census of Wales shows him (wrongly recorded as Morgan Morgan) living in Black Vein Colliery with his wife and children then born, employed as "Coal Agent". By 1855 he had risen to colliery manager.

In 1858 his employers either sent or encouraged him to West Somerset to manage the Brendon Hills Iron Ore Company, one of their suppliers, on the death of its Mines Captain, David Richard. Within a year Morgans also took over from William Roberts as engineer of the West Somerset Mineral Railway, which had been promoted by the Ebbw Vale company to bring iron ore from the mines in the Brendon Hills to Watchet harbour. The ore was shipped from Watchet to Newport then taken by train to the furnaces at Ebbw Vale. He was promoted from the railway's engineer to manager in 1863.

The railway, though less than twelve miles long, included a massive, 3,272 feet (997 m) long, rope-worked inclined plane to bring the ore down a 770 feet (230 m) vertical interval on a 1 in 4 (25%) gradient from the mines to the coastal plain on which Watchet stands.

Morgans' previous experience had been at the coal mining and smelting ends of the industry, nevertheless his abilities were such that he made the best of the challenges his two new roles presented. He is credited with driving the completion of the incline and its huge winding gear on a barren moorland site at the top of a hill "in the middle of nowhere" and of extending the line to Gupworthy to tap new and extended mines in that area. He is further credited with optimising the yield of Haematite and Spathic iron ore from a fragmented patchwork of lodes in ground which was often soft, wet and difficult.

Morgans developed a method of working which optimised the processes where miners were working at a high face with several levels. The team would leave pillars of ore as they progressed forwards, with vertical holes connecting each level. Good ore was tipped by barrow down these holes, collecting in significant quantities at the bottom, from where it was hauled to the surface on tramway tubs. This gave the upper teams free rein and required much less underground railway and equipment. When the face ended the teams worked backwards removing the pillars as they went.

At Bearland Wood Morgans erected a ventilation flue which reprised an old method of ventilating a mine which had been thought obsolete with the advent of steam pumps. He was doing so when the Mines Inspector at Risca Colliery (near where Morgans had been a colliery manager) declared steam pumps to be unsatisfactory and ordered their older ventilation furnaces to be reinstated. The flue stands to this day as a scheduled monument in remote upland woodland in Somerset.

He had joined the South Wales Institute of Engineers when it was founded in 1857, delivering a "most valuable account of the mines and their ores" in 1867.

On 1 January 1867 Morgans gave his employers three months notice, as he was setting up in private practice in Bristol, though whether that was the whole story of the cause of his departure is unclear. Based on the man's character it has been speculated that he saw, accurately, that there was no future in the Brendons project. In his last years in the Brendons he had been assisted by his sons William and Thomas, who joined him in his new venture. The business did well as T & W Morgans, remaining in the Bristol area until 1923.

In 1868 Morgan and William were briefly involved in trying to reopen a lead mine at Beer, Devon. In the same year he designed and supervised the installation of an innovative pumping system at Bryngwyn Colliery, Bedwas, Wales.

Morgan Morgans married Mary Ann Tucker in 1838. They had seven children; four boys who all became engineers and three girls. Mary died in Bristol in 1896.

Morgans was a man of striking appearance with a large beard and piercing eyes. He had a temper described as "gusty, even by Victorian standards" and was said to be "not easy to live or work with."
