= Justin Morgan (disambiguation) =

Justin Morgan may refer to:

- Justin Morgan (1747–1798), American horse breeder and composer
- Justin Morgan (rugby league) (born 1975), Australian and Welsh rugby player
- Justin C. Morgan (1900–1959), U.S. federal judge
- Justin Morgan (Home and Away), a fictional character from the Australian soap opera Home and Away
