= Michael L. Morgan =

American philosopher (born 1944)

Michael Morgan
- Born: 1944 (age 81–82)
- Awards: Kent Fellowship, Lilly Endowment

Education
- Education: University of Toronto (PhD), Hebrew Union College (MA), Syracuse University (BA)

Philosophical work
- Era: 21st-century philosophy
- Region: Western philosophy
- Institutions: Indiana University
- Main interests: Jewish philosophy

Michael L. Morgan (born 1944) is an American philosopher and Chancellor's Professor Emeritus of Philosophy at Indiana University where he is also Chancellor's Professor Emeritus of Jewish Studies. Morgan became the Senator Jerahmiel S. and Carole S. Grafstein Chair in Jewish Philosophy at the University of Toronto in the fall of 2015. He is known for his works on Jewish philosophy.

== Books ==
- The Jewish Thought of Emil Fackenheim, edited with introductions (Wayne State University Press, 1987)
- Platonic Piety: Philosophy and Ritual in Fourth-Century Athens (Yale University Press, 1990)
- Classics in Moral and Political Theory (editor)(Hackett Publishing, 1992; 2nd edition 1996; 3rd edition, 2001 ; Press, 4th edition, 2005; 5th edition, 2011)
- Dilemmas in Modern Jewish Thought: The Dialectics of Revelation and History (Indiana University 1992)
- Jewish Philosophers and Jewish Philosophy: Essays by Emil Fackenheim (edited with introductions) (Indiana University Press, 1996)
- Beyond Auschwitz: Post-Holocaust Jewish Thought in America (Oxford University Press, 2001)
- A Holocaust Reader: Responses to the Nazi Extermination (Oxford University Press, 2000)
- Interim Judaism: Jewish Thought in a Century of Crisis (Indiana University Press, 2001)
- Franz Rosenzweig: Philosophical and Theological Writings. Edited, translated, and essays with Paul Franks (Hackett Publishing, 2000)
- Spinoza. Complete Works. Edited, with introductions and notes. (Hackett Publishing, 2002)
- The Essential Spinoza: Ethics and Other Writings. Edited, with introductions (Hackett Publishing, 2006)
- Discovering Levinas (Cambridge University Press, 2007)
- The Cambridge Companion to Modern Jewish Philosophy. Edited, with introduction, with Peter Eli Gordon (Cambridge University Press, 2007)
- Philosopher as Witness: Reflections on Fackenheim. Edited with Benjamin Pollock (SUNY Press, 2008)
- On Shame (Routledge, “Thinking in Action” Series, 2008)
- The Cambridge Introduction to Emmanuel Levinas (Cambridge University Press, 2011)
- Fackenheim’s Jewish Philosophy: An Introduction (University of Toronto Press, 2013)
- Rethinking the Messianic Idea in Judaism. Edited with Steven Weitzman (Indiana University Press, 2014)
- Levinas’s Ethical Politics (Indiana University Press, May 18, 2016)
- The Oxford Handbook of Emmanuel Levinas Editor (Oxford University Press, 2019)
- Michael L. Morgan: History and Moral Normativity (Library of Contemporary Jewish Philosophers, vol.20), eds. Hava Tirosh-Samuelson and Aaron W. Hughes (Brill, 2018)
