= Jack M. Morgan =

American politician (1924–2004)

Member of the New Mexico Senate
- In office 1973–1988

Personal details
- Born: January 15, 1924 Portales, New Mexico, U.S.
- Died: August 11, 2004 (aged 80)
- Party: Republican
- Education: University of Texas at Austin

Jack M. Morgan (January 15, 1924 – August 11, 2004) was an American politician. He served as a member of the New Mexico Senate.

== Life and career ==
Morgan was born in Portales, New Mexico. He attended the University of Texas at Austin.

Morgan served in the New Mexico Senate from 1973 to 1988.

Morgan died on August 11, 2004 of bone cancer, at the age of 80.
