= Tom Morgan =

Tom Morgan may refer to:

== Sports ==
- Tom Morgan (rugby union) (1866–1899), Wales international rugby union player
- Tom Morgan (footballer), football (soccer) manager with Wrexham and Port Vale
- Tom Morgan (baseball) (1930–1987), American baseball player
- Tom Morgan (cricketer) (1893–1975), Welsh cricketer

== Other ==
- Tom Morgan (musician) (born 1970), Australian musician and songwriter
- Tom Morgan (bishop) (born 1941), Canadian Anglican metropolitan bishop
- Tom Morgan (comics), American comic book artist

== See also ==
- Thomas Morgan (disambiguation)
