= John Morgan (Australian footballer) =

Australian rules footballer

Personal information
- Full name: John Morgan
- Born: 28 April 1953 (age 73)
- Original team: Old Scotch Collegians
- Height: 188 cm (6 ft 2 in)
- Weight: 81.5 kg (180 lb)

Playing career^{1}
Years	Club	Games (Goals)
1973	Melbourne	4 (0)
- ^{1} Playing statistics correct to the end of 1973.

John Morgan (born 28 April 1953) is a former Australian rules footballer who played with Melbourne in the Victorian Football League (VFL).
