= Henry A. Morgan =

Arizona pioneer and politician

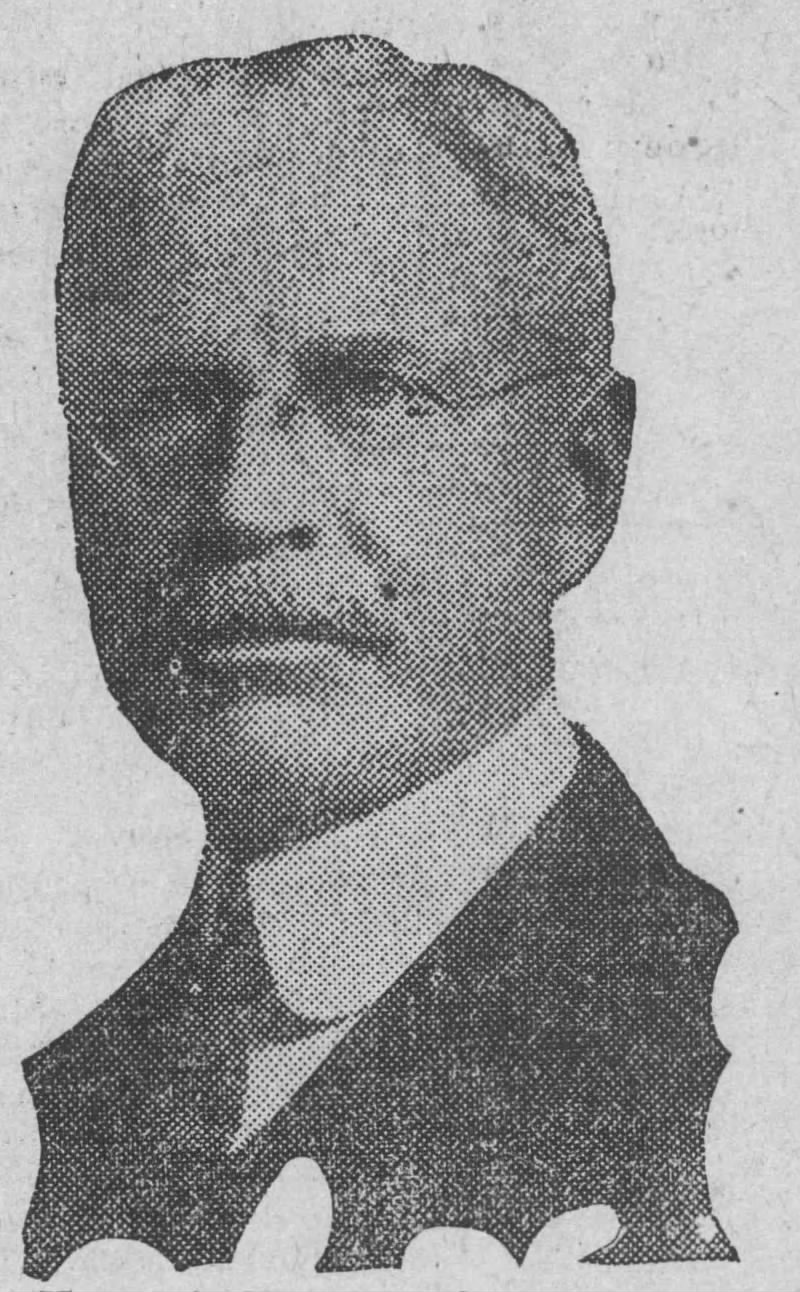
- Morgan, ca. 1926
- Born: August , 1861; California
- Died: November 20, 1942 (aged 81); Phoenix, Arizona
- Occupations: Merchant, politician

Henry A. Morgan was an Arizona pioneer. He was born in California in 1861. He moved to Tucson, Arizona in 1880, where he worked for L. Zeckendorf and Company. While in Tucson, he met John H. Norton, who owned the trading post at Fort Grant. He moved to Fort Grant to take over the books for Norton, and while there, he worked as a justice of the peace and postmaster. In approximately 1888, the trading post at Fort Grant was closed, and Norton moved his mercantile enterprise to Willcox, and Morgan moved with the business. When Norton incorporated his business, it was with Morgan as his partner, and the company was called the Norton Morgan Commercial Company, which became one of the largest commercial enterprises in Arizona. Upon Norton's death, the business became the sole property of Morgan.

Morgan married Anna Belle Dixon in April 1886. In 1895, territorial governor Alexander Oswald Brodie appointed Morgan to the Arizona Board of Equalization. He served as a Grand Master of the Masons. In 1914 he was urged to run on the Republican ticket for the governorship of Arizona. He would only accept the nomination if they Progressives would agree to consolidate their votes. He ended up not running. In 1915, when Willcox was incorporated, Morgan was elected as the first mayor. His wife died in a Los Angeles, California hospital in April 1924, where she had been taken for treatment for an illness several weeks prior. In August 1926, Morgan took office as the Arizona Register of Public Lands, appointed by President Coolidge. Morgan died on November 20, 1942, at his home in Phoenix.
