= Michelle Morgan (athletic administrator) =

American sports administrator

Biographical details
- Born: 1983 (age 42–43); Brookfield, Illinois, U.S.

Playing career
- 2001–2005: St. Thomas (MN)
- Position: Defense

Administrative career (AD unless noted)
- 2014–2018: St. Thomas (MN) (assoc. AD)
- 2018–2023: John Carroll
- 2023–2024: Atlantic Hockey Association (commissioner)
- 2023–2024: College Hockey America (commissioner)
- 2024–present: Atlantic Hockey America (commissioner)

Michelle Morgan (née Radzik; born 1983) is an American athletic administrator and commissioner of the Atlantic Hockey America (AHA). She previously led the AHA's two predecessor leagues, the Atlantic Hockey Association and College Hockey America, and was the athletic director at John Carroll University.

== Early life ==
Born Michelle Radzik, Morgan grew up in Brookfield, Illinois. Her father was the chief of police in McCook, Illinois and died when Morgan was eight years old. She graduated from Lyons Township High School in 2001 and was the first female recipient of the Chicago Blackhawks Alumni Association scholarship. She played defenceman for the St. Thomas Tommies women's ice hockey team from 2001 to 2005 and had three goals and 11 assists in 67 games. She graduated from the University of St. Thomas with a degree in business administration in 2005 and later earned an executive masters of business administration from St. Thomas.

== Career ==
Morgan began her career as an intern for the Minnesota Vikings of the National Football League. She then worked for the National Hockey League's Minnesota Wild, first in corporate sponsorships and services, then in corporate sponsorships and advertising. In 2010, Morgan returned to her alma mater as director of marketing. She was later promoted to senior women administrator and associate athletic director, where she managed sports information, season ticket operations, sponsorship sales, and revenue generation for the school's athletic complex, as well as external relations, branding, and marketing initiatives that included negotiations for the university's first program-wide athletic apparel contract. Morgan also remained active with the Chicago Blackhawk Alumni Association as an associate member and director of events. She was the organization's liaison to the NHL, Minnesota Wild, St. Louis Blues, and the Chicago Blackhawks for the alumni games played prior to the 2016 NHL Stadium Series game played at TCF Bank Stadium and the 2017 NHL Winter Classic at Busch Stadium.

In 2018, Morgan was named athletic director at John Carroll University. Under her leadership, JCU's teams won 42 men's and women's Ohio Athletic Conference championships and made 42 NCAA tournament appearances. She oversaw renovations to a number of the school's athletic facilities, the celebration of the athletic department's 100th anniversary, the groundbreaking for an athletic fieldhouse, the unveiling of a new logo, and the addition of a new varsity sport (women's wrestling). From 2022 to 2023, Morgan was also the chair of the NCAA Division III management council.

In 2023, Morgan was named commissioner of the Atlantic Hockey Association (a men's ice hockey conference) and College Hockey America (a women's ice hockey conference). In 2024, the two conferences merged to form Atlantic Hockey America.
