= Lionel Morgan =

Lionel Morgan is the name of:

- Lionel Morgan (footballer) (born 1983), English football midfielder
- Lionel Morgan (rugby league) (1938–2023), Australian rugby league footballer
