= Jack Morgan (footballer) =

Australian rules footballer

Personal information
- Full name: John Thomas Morgan
- Born: 3 December 1920; Warrnambool, Victoria
- Died: 16 July 2005 (aged 84); Geelong, Victoria
- Original team: St Josephs
- Height: 179 cm (5 ft 10 in)
- Weight: 66 kg (146 lb)

Playing career^{1}
Years	Club	Games (Goals)
1944–45	Geelong	8 (0)
- ^{1} Playing statistics correct to the end of 1945.

John Thomas Morgan (3 December 1920 – 16 July 2005) was an Australian rules footballer who played with Geelong in the Victorian Football League (VFL).

Originally granted a permit to join Geelong in 1941, Morgan's career was delayed by his service in the Australian Army during World War II.

In 1946, Morgan was granted a permit to move to St Kilda, but he did not play a senior game for them.
