= Wendy Morgan =

Wendy Morgan may refer to:

- Wendy Morgan (politician), former Deputy in the States of Guernsey
- Wendy Morgan (actress) (born 1958), English actress
- Wendy Morgan, pen name of Wendy Corsi Staub (born 1964), American writer
