= Roger Morgan =

Roger Morgan may refer to:

- Roger Morgan (footballer) (born 1946)
- Roger Morgan (designer)
- Roger Morgan (librarian) (1926–2018)
