= Sixth Form Colleges' Association =

UK education provider organisation

The Sixth Form Colleges Association (SFCA) is an organisation that represents over 90 sixth form education providers in England; its members are sixth form colleges and other providers of 16–19 education, including academies and further education colleges. There are over 160,000 students studying at a sixth form college, and the sector is responsible for over 20% of the A levels sat in England each year.

SFCA has been representing the interests of the sector since sixth form colleges became independent corporations in 1992. The SFCA leads national negotiations with recognised trade unions on pay and conditions of staff in 16-19 providers. The SFCA produces a range of publications, including an annual funding survey that outlines the impact of funding cuts on 16-19 providers.

The SFCA also act as the secretariat for the All Party Parliamentary Group for Sixth Form Colleges.

== Post-16 area reviews ==
In 2015, the Department for Education announced a major restructuring of the further education sector, through 37 area reviews of post-16 provision. The SFCA criticised the reviews for not directly including providers of post-16 education other than colleges, such as school and academy sixth forms and independent training providers. The proposals were similarly criticised by NUS then-Vice President for Further Education Shakira Martin for not sufficiently taking into account the impact on learners.
