= Paul Morgan (judge) =

The Honourable Mr Justice Morgan
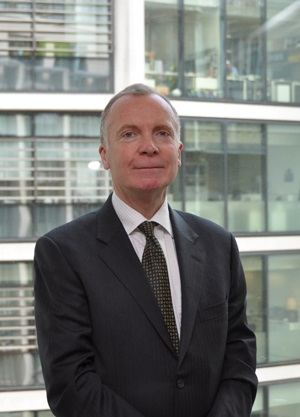

Justice of the High Court
- Incumbent
- Assumed office 2007

Personal details
- Born: 17 August 1952 (age 74)
- Education: Peterhouse, Cambridge

Sir Paul Hyacinth Morgan (born 17 August 1952) is an English jurist who served as a judge of the High Court of England and Wales until his retirement on 30 September 2021.

He was educated at St Columb's College and Peterhouse, Cambridge.

He was called to the bar at Lincoln's Inn in 1975 and was appointed a judge of the High Court of Justice (Chancery Division) in 2007.
