= James Morgan (rugby union) =

England international rugby union player

- Full name: James Rydiard Morgan
- Born: 1889 or 1890 Cockermouth, England
- Died: 29 April 1961 (aged 61) Hawick, Scotland

Rugby union career
- Position: Hooker
International career
Years	Team	Apps	(Points)
1920	England	1	(0)

James Rydiard Morgan was an English international rugby union player.

Born in Cockermouth, Morgan was a Cumberland representative forward and gained his solitary England cap via Scottish rugby, having been captaining Hawick RFC. He played as a hooker for England against Wales at Swansea during the 1920 Five Nations, a match in which they were soundly beaten.

Morgan worked as director of a wool merchant firm in Hawick.

== See also ==
- List of England national rugby union players
