= George Morgan (footballer) =

Australian rules footballer

Personal information
- Full name: George Ross Morgan
- Born: 10 October 1877; Castlemaine, Victoria
- Died: 8 July 1948 (aged 70); Heidelberg, Victoria
- Original team: Echuca / Scotch College

Playing career^{1}
Years	Club	Games (Goals)
1898, 1902–03	St Kilda	16 (1)
- ^{1} Playing statistics correct to the end of 1903.

George Ross Morgan (10 October 1877 – 8 July 1948) was an Australian rules footballer who played with St Kilda in the Victorian Football League (VFL).

He later served in World War I.
