= George E. Morgan =

American artist (1870–1969)

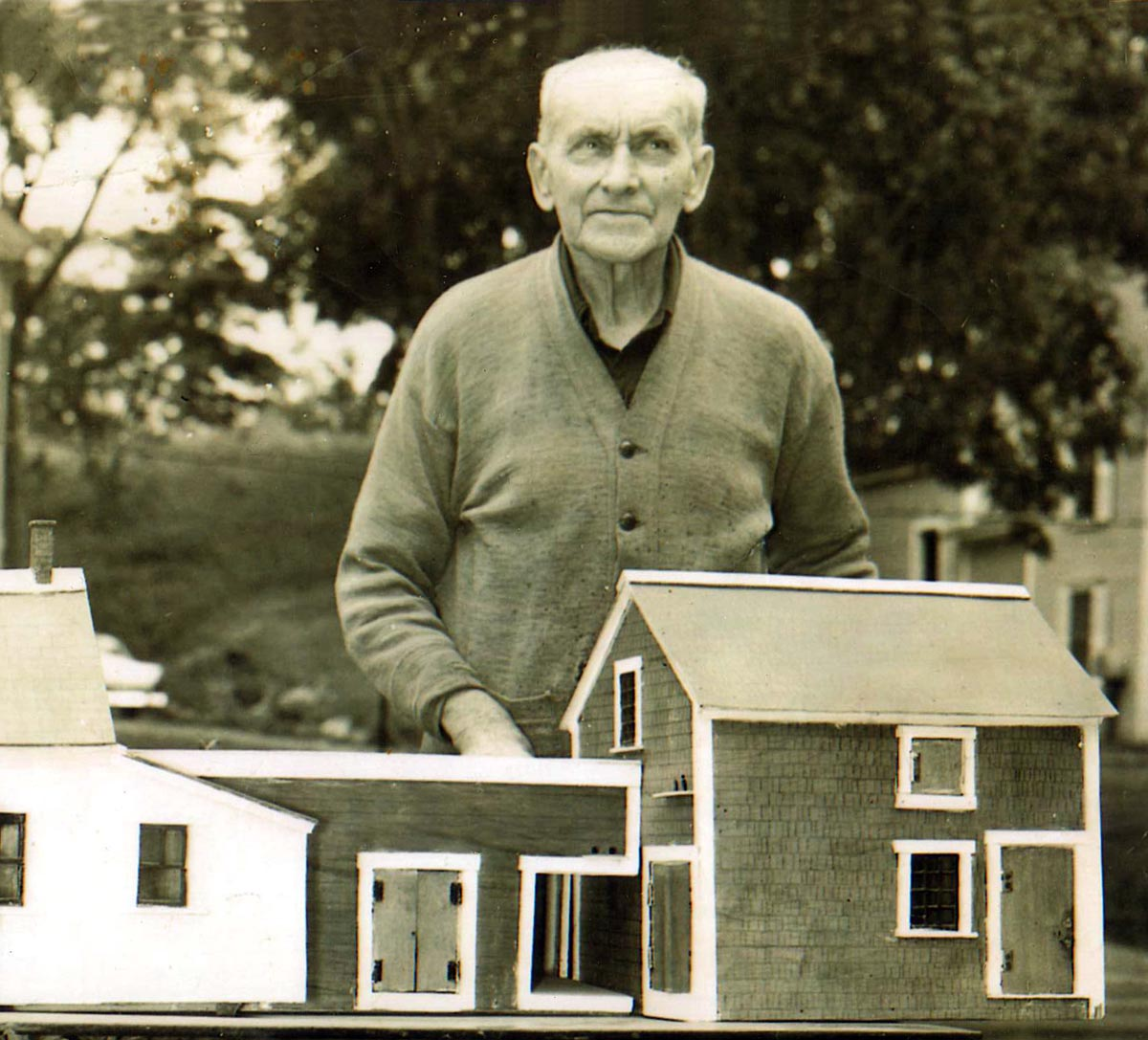
- George E. Morgan
- Born: October 9, 1870; Chelsea, Maine, US
- Died: January 1, 1969 (aged 98); Augusta, Maine, US
- Occupation: folk artist
- Children: five

George E. Morgan (October 9, 1870 – 1969) was a Maine folk artist.

== Early life ==
George Eugene Morgan was born in Chelsea, Maine, to George William and Vesta Rowena Farnham Morgan. As a young man, Morgan worked along Maine's Kennebec River: first in Augusta with a furniture maker; as a harness maker, later in Gardiner at the Commonwealth Shoe Company and the R.P. Hazzard Company.

He served as sergeant in the Maine Militia. Later, during World War 1, at age 47, was disqualified to serve in the military as exceeding the maximum age. He married twice and had five children.

== Artistic career ==
In the spring of 1962, Morgan, at the age of 91 and living in a rest home in Gardiner, met local folk art and antiques dealer, Anne Wardwell of Farmingdale. The art dealer supported Morgan's start with supplies like brushes, paints, turpentine and canvas boards. It is believed that across an eighteen month period, Morgan created more than twenty paintings.

It is suggested that Morgan's style and subject choices may have been influenced by the bicentennial of Hallowell, his age, possible lack of mobility or living in a rest home.

George E. Morgan, Old Covered Bridge between Randolph and Gardiner, July 1962, Oil on paper, 10" × 14"

The painting, "Old Covered Bridge between Randolph and Gardiner", his earliest dated work, was compared to the works of other Maine artists, Milton Avery or Diebenkorn, as well as Morgan's other works titled "Moulton Mill" and "Ice Houses on the Kennebec River".

== Retirement ==
At 94, George Morgan retired and died 1969 in Augusta, Maine at the age of 99.

== Exhibitions ==
- The Playhouse, Boothbay, Maine 1963
- Farnsworth Art Museum, Rockland, Maine, "George E. Morgan: Self Taught Painter of Maine" July 16 - October 11, 1998
- The Center for Intuitive and Outsider Art, Chicago, IL, "George E. Morgan: Maine Streets" February 5 - April 10, 1999

== Literature ==
- "Painter Makes Primitives of Early Boyhood Scenes," KENNEBEC JOURNAL, Augusta, Maine, February 18, 1966, Ruth Henderson
- UNEXPECTED ELOQUENCE, The Edith Blum Art Institute, Bard College, Annandale-on-Hudson, 1990, by Howard Rose
- THE POOLES OF PISMO BAY, published by Raymond Saroff, 1990, by Howard Rose
- "George E. Morgan: Self Taught Maine Artist," FOLK ART MAGAZINE, Summer 1998, p. 33 by Chippy Irvine
- "Art," CHICAGO READER, Chicago, Illinois, March 12, 1999, Fred Camper
- MEMORIES OF THE KENNEBEC, published by S. Scott Powers Antiques, 2006, by Steven S. Powers
