= Edward Morgan (archdeacon) =

Edward Morgan was an Irish Anglican priest in the 17th century.

Morgan was Treasurer of Ardfert Cathedral from 1664 to 1669; and Archdeacon of Ardfert from 1669 to 1676.

Church of Ireland titles
Preceded by John Smith	Archdeacon of Ardfert; 1669–1676	Succeeded by Walter O'Neale
