= David Campbell (clarinetist) =

- Born: David Campbell; 15 April 1953 (age 73)
- Origin: England
- Genres: Classical; Contemporary
- Occupations: Director of Winds at Canterbury Christ Church University; Head of Woodwind at Westminster School; Artistic Director of Musicfest–Aberystwyth; Course Director of the International Clarinet Course at Harrogate
- Instrument: Clarinet
- Formerly of: Fires of London
- Website: David Campbell

David Campbell (born 15 April 1953) is a British clarinettist.

Campbell is internationally recognised as one of Britain's finest musicians and was described by the doyen of British clarinettists, Jack Brymer, as 'the finest player of his generation'.

Campbell attended Barton Peveril Grammar School in Eastleigh, Hampshire.

A large part of Campbell's early career was spent as a clarinettist in the field of contemporary music as a member of Sir Peter Maxwell Davies's chamber ensemble, 'The Fires of London', also playing regularly with the London Sinfonietta, Endymion, and Lontano, but over the past twenty years David Campbell has developed the solo and chamber music strands of his career, performing in over forty countries with leading orchestras and ensembles.

His repertoire is wide-ranging but he still champions new works, many of which have been written for him. The most recent were a new concerto 'River of Crystal Light' by Peter Lieuwen, which he played and recorded in the Texas Festival in June 2005 and a clarinet quintet, 'The Sun and the Moon' by Michael Stimpson which received its premiere in Aberystwyth with the RTÉ Vanbrugh Quartet in July 2005. In February 2006 David played concertos by Mozart and Charles Fitts (World Premiere) in the USA with the Houston Chamber Orchestra.

As well as numerous broadcasts over the past thirty years, David has made many CDs including two versions of the Mozart Clarinet Concerto with the City of London Sinfonia and Royal Philharmonic Orchestra, two versions of the Βrahms Clarinet Sonatas as well as the Mozart and Brahms Quintets, Messiaen Quartet for the End of Time, two albums of music by Charles Camilleri, the Bliss Clarinet Quintet, Philip Cannon's Quintet, Logos and works by Martinu, Peter Maxwell Davies and Carey Blyton. His recording of Peter Lieuwen's 'River of Crystal Light' was released in May 2007 and future projects include recording a third CD of works by Charles Camilleri and an album of English clarinet quintets, and concertos by Carl Davis, Gerald Finzi and Graham Fitkin in Estonia with the Tallinn Chamber Orchestra.

David Campbell particularly enjoys the genre of the Clarinet Quintet and has appeared as a guest artist with the Bingham String Quartet, Bridge String Quartet, Brodsky String Quartet, Copenhagen String Quartet (Denmark), Coull String Quartet, Danubius String Quartet (Hungary), Delme String Quartet, Emperor String Quartet, Endellion String Quartet, Fine Arts String Quartet (USA), Maggini String Quartet, Medici String Quartet, Solstice String Quartet and Tippett String Quartet. During 2007 David has toured the UK extensively with the Sacconi String Quartet (Second Prize Winners in the London International String Quartet Competition in April 2006).

David Campbell is also passionate about music education. He holds positions as a Director of Winds at Canterbury Christ Church University and Head of Woodwind at Westminster School. David has been Artistic Director of MusicFest Aberystwyth since 2002 and is Course Director of the International Clarinet Course at Harrogate.

David Campbell is the UK Chair of the International Clarinet Association, and has represented the UK at the international clarinet conferences in London, Quebec, Ghent, Lubbock, Texas, Paris, Ostend, Salt Lake City, Stockholm and Vancouver. He has recently been appointed to the Executive Committee of the Clarinet and Saxophone Society of Great Britain.
