= Justice Morgan =

Justice Morgan may refer to:

- David Morgan (judge) (1849–1912), associate justice of the North Dakota Supreme Court
- Declan Morgan (born 1952), Lord Chief Justice of Northern Ireland
- John T. Morgan (judge) (c. 1830–1910), associate justice of the Idaho Supreme Court
- Joseph H. Morgan (1884–1967), associate justice of the Arizona Supreme Court
- June P. Morgan (1917–1998), associate justice and chief justice of the Supreme Court of Missouri
- Philip H. Morgan (1825–1900), associate justice of the Louisiana Supreme Court
- Richard Morgan (Ceylonese judge) (1821–1876), acting chief justice of Ceylon
- Robert E. Morgan (1924–2009), associate justice of the South Dakota Supreme Court
- William McKendree Morgan (1869–1942), associate justice and chief justice of the Idaho Supreme Court
- Justice Morgan (footballer) (born 1991), Nigerian footballer

== See also ==
- Judge Morgan (disambiguation)
