= Trevor Morgan =

Trevor Morgan may refer to:

- Trevor Morgan (actor) (born 1986), American actor
- Trevor Morgan (footballer) (born 1956), English footballer
- J. Trevor Morgan (1923–1989), member of the Canadian House of Commons
- Trevor Morgan (EastEnders), a character in the British soap opera EastEnders
- Trevor Morgan, head coach of the Australia men's national under-20 soccer team

== See also ==
- Trefor Richard Morgan (1914–1970), Welsh nationalist activist
