= Harry H. Morgan =

Australian rules footballer

Harry Morgan

Personal information
- Full name: Henry Huston Morgan
- Born: 17 February 1871; Melbourne
- Died: 5 November 1924 (aged 53); East Melbourne, Victoria
- Original team: West Melbourne

Playing career^{1}
Years	Club	Games (Goals)
1897	Carlton	11 (0)
- ^{1} Playing statistics correct to the end of 1897.

Henry Huston Morgan (17 February 1871 – 5 November 1924) was an Australian rules footballer who played with Carlton in the Victorian Football League (VFL).
