= George Morgan (cricketer) =

Australian cricketer

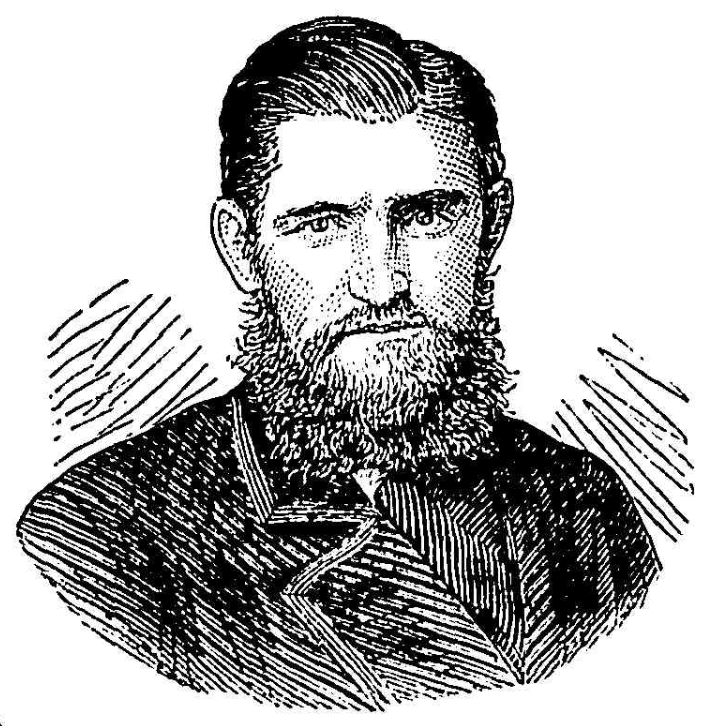

Personal information
- Born: 7 July 1844; Bathurst, New South Wales, Australia
- Died: 17 July 1896 (aged 52); Sydney, Australia
- Source: ESPNcricinfo, 9 January 2017

George Morgan (7 July 1844 – 17 July 1896) was an Australian cricketer. He played one first-class match for New South Wales in 1874/75.

== See also ==
- List of New South Wales representative cricketers
