= Harry Morgan (rugby union) =

- Full name: Harry Perrott Morgan
- Born: 16 June 1930 Goytre, Pontypool, Wales
- University: University of Cambridge

Rugby union career
- Position: Centre
International career
Years	Team	Apps	(Points)
1956	Wales	4	(3)

Harry Perrott Morgan (born 16 June 1930) is a Welsh former international rugby union player.

Morgan was born in Goytre, Pontypool, and attended the University of Cambridge, where he gained his blues in the 1952 and 1953 Varsity Matches as an outside-half.

In 1956, Morgan was capped as a centre in all four matches for Wales in their title-winning Five Nations campaign and contributed a try in the win over Scotland at Cardiff Arms Park.

Morgan played his Welsh club rugby for Newport and Cardiff.

== See also ==
- List of Wales national rugby union players
