= John H. Morgan (Mississippi politician) =

American politician

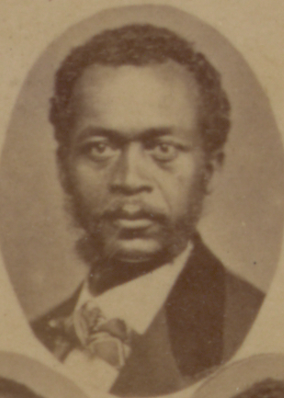

John H. Morgan was a state legislator in Mississippi. He grew cotton and corn on a large farm. He served in the Mississippi House of Representatives for Washington County, Mississippi from 1870 to 1875.

He was born in Maryland. He served on the Washington County Board of Supervisors.

== See also ==
- African American officeholders from the end of the Civil War until before 1900
