= Nicholas Morgan =

Nicholas Morgan could refer to:

- Nicky Morgan (footballer) (born 1959), English footballer
- Nicholas Morgan (shot putter) (died 2020), English shot putter
- Nicholas Morgan (field hockey), Welsh field hockey player
- Nick Morgan (born 1953), American speaking coach and author
- Nick Morgan (musician), writer of No Scotland, No Party, the unofficial anthem of the Scotland men's national football team.
