= Sally Morgan =

Sally Morgan may refer to:

- Sally Morgan (artist) (born 1951), Australian Aboriginal author, scriptwriter and artist
- Sally J. Morgan, emeritus professor of art in New Zealand
- Sally Morgan, Baroness Morgan of Huyton (born 1959), British politician
- Sally Morgan (psychic) (born 1951), British celebrity psychic
