= Walter O'Neale =

Irish Anglican priest

Walter O'Neale, D.D. was an Irish Anglican priest.

O'Neale was educated at Trinity College, Dublin. He was Archdeacon of Ardfert from 1676 to 1686; Treasurer of Cork from 1681 to 1686; Prebendary of Templebryan in Ross Cathedral from 1682 to 1684; Chancellor of Ross from 1683 to 1706; Precentor of Cork from 1686 to 1706; and a Prebendary of Kilmaclenine in Cloyne Cathedral from 1706.
