= David William Rowsen Morgan =

American mechanical engineer and business executive

David William Rowsen (D. W. R. or David W. R.) Morgan (September 16, 1892 – April 30, 1973) was an American mechanical engineer and business executive at the Westinghouse Electric Corporation, known as 74th president of the American Society of Mechanical Engineers in the year 1955-56.

== Biography ==
=== Youth, education and early career ===
Morgan was born in 1892 in Martins Ferry, Ohio, son of William E. Morgan and Sarah (Thomas) Morgan. In 1913, at the age of 21, he obtained his MSc in mechanical engineering from Ohio Northern University.

After his graduation in 1913 Morgan started his lifelong career at the Westinghouse Electrical Corporation in Philadelphia. By 1917 he was engineer at the condenser department, where he was later promoted to Engineer in Charge of the Condenser Department. In 1926 he got appointed manager condenser and internal combustion engineering in the internal combustion engine department of the Westinghouse Electric.

=== Further career and acknowledgement ===
In the 1930s Morgan had become assistant manager of engineering of the South Philadelphia plant of Westinghouse Electric. In 1941 he got appointed vice president of the South Philadelphia plant.

From 1948 to 1953 Morgan was general manager of Westinghouse Steam Division, and from 1953 until his retirement late 1955 he was vice president of Westinghouse Electric Co. After his retirement he was Professorship of Engineering at the Drexel Institute of Technology, now the Drexel University.

Morgan was awarded the Westinghouse Order of Merit in 1942. In 1950 he was awarded the honorary doctorate in engineering from Drexel Institute of Technology. Morgan was elected president of the American Society of Mechanical Engineers for the year 1955-56. He had been elected Fellow of the ASME, and was member of the Hoover Medal Board of Award.

== Selected publications ==
Articles, a selection

- Morgan, D. W. R. "Central Station Steam-Power Generation." Westinghouse Engineer 10 (1950): 7-17.

Patents, a selection

- Morgan, David WR. "Large jet condenser." U.S. Patent No. 1,457,788. 5 Jun. 1923.
- Morgan, David WR. "Surface condenser." U.S. Patent No. 1,578,057. 23 Mar. 1926.
- Morgan, David WR. "House electric." U.S. Patent No. 1,684,406. 18 Sep. 1928.
- Morgan, David WR. "Ejector apparatus." U.S. Patent No 2,033,843, 10 March 1936.
- Tuley, Charles B., and David WR Morgan. "Condenser apparatus." U.S. Patent No. 2,180,840. 21 Nov. 1939.
