= James Morgan (journalist) =

James Morgan (29 December 1938 – 26 June 2002) was the BBC World Service's economics correspondent from 1974 to 1998. He was also a prominent national newspaper columnist, writing a personal column in the Financial Times from 1995 to 1999. He was known for his "wise, incisive" reporting style and ability to summarise complex economic issues comprehensibly. He began his working life on the Far Eastern Economic Review, a Malaysia-based magazine devoted to financial affairs, before moving to the Centre for Economic Policy Research. During his career at the World Service, he reported on all the major international economic events of the period, including the consequences of the fall of the Berlin Wall and the first meetings of the G7.

His book, The Last Generation (1996), was a study of the prospects for economic intervention in the progress of global warming. It was written under the auspices of the World Humanity Action Trust (WHAT).
