= Sophie Morgan (author) =

British author and journalist (born 1979)

- Born: 1979 (age 46–47)
- Citizenship: British
- Occupations: Author and Journalist
- Writing career
- Pen name: Sophie Morgan
- Language: English
- Genre: Memoir
- Subject: erotica
- Notable work: Diary of A Submissive No Ordinary Love Story

Sophie Morgan (born 1979) is a British author and journalist who lives in London. She is a two-time Sunday Times Bestselling author whose books, published by Penguin Books, have become best sellers in ten countries.

Her name, according to her publisher’s website, is a pseudonym. Her publicist describes her as a "21st century woman" who is smart and has a successful journalism career. On social media sites, she describes herself as a feminist. Morgan is married and has a child.

== Diary of a Submissive ==
Sophie Morgan's first book, Diary of a Submissive, is an erotic memoir which has been likened to a memoir by a "real-life Anastasia," the Fifty Shades heroine. The book purports to be a true-life story of female submission. Morgan's "diary", as narrated in the book, follows the story of her sexual life, from the early days in college to the present time, and describes her experiences with dominant men.

Morgan reviewed the film 'Fifty Shades of Grey' when it was released and wrote that she thought the relationship between the two characters was more "abusive rather than romantic". She commented that the characters were "Literally not believable as a human being".

Morgan's "memoir" was published in 2012 by Gotham, an imprint of Penguin Books and on Kindle/iTunes. The book was on the Sunday Times Best-Seller List as the number one non-fiction title. A book launch was attended by celebrities such as Cheska Hull at Sam Roddick's 'luxury erotic emporium' Coco de Mer in London, as featured in Cosmopolitan.

== No Ordinary Love Story ==
In No Ordinary Love Story, the controversial sequel to Morgan's first book, Sophie tells us what she did next, how she struggled to combine a regular relationship with her sexual desires. The book was published in March 2013 by Penguin Books and Amazon Kindle, and went into the Sunday Times Bestseller List in the first week of publication.
