= Joseph Morgan =

Joseph or Joe Morgan may refer to:

== Film and television ==
- Joseph Morgan (actor) (born 1981), English television actor
- Joey Morgan, actor
- Joe Morgan, a character in 1942 film A-Haunting We Will Go

== Sports ==
- Joe Morgan (American football) (born 1988), American football wide receiver
- Joe Morgan (badminton) (born 1979), Welsh badminton player
- Joe Morgan (1943–2020), American baseball player and commentator, member of Baseball Hall of Fame
- Joe Morgan (baseball manager) (1930–2026), American baseball player and manager
- Joe Morgan (rugby union) (1945–2002), New Zealand rugby union player
- Joe Morgan (shot putter) (born 1932), American shot putter, 1953 All-American for the Ohio State Buckeyes track and field team

== Others ==
- Joseph Morgan (historian) (fl. 1739), British historical compiler
- Joseph Morgan (politician) (1898–1962), Ulster Unionist politician representing Belfast Cromac, 1953–1962
- Joe "Pegleg" Morgan (1929–1993), Mexican Mafia godfather
- Joe Morgan (musician) (fl. 1996–2006), former bass player for InMe
- Joseph H. Morgan (1884–1967), Justice of the Arizona Supreme Court

== See also ==
- Jo Morgan, fictional character in British police drama The Bill
- Joseph Morgan House, a National Register of Historic Places listing in Mercer County, Kentucky, U.S.
