= Dave Morgan (Australian footballer) =

Australian rules footballer (born 1930)

Personal information
- Full name: David Henry Morgan
- Born: 29 September 1930
- Died: 16 July 2025 (aged 94)
- Original team: Collingwood Juniors
- Height: 179 cm (5 ft 10 in)
- Weight: 74 kg (163 lb)

Playing career^{1}
Years	Club	Games (Goals)
1950	Collingwood	1 (0)
1951	Hawthorn	1 (0)
1952	Brunswick (VFA)	16 (0)
- ^{1} Playing statistics correct to the end of 1952.

David Henry Morgan (29 September 1930 – 16 July 2025) was an Australian rules footballer who played with Collingwood and Hawthorn in the Victorian Football League (VFL). He subsequently played with Brunswick in the Victorian Football Association (VFA).
