= David Owen Morgan =

British zoologist

Daniel Owen Morgan FRSE (19 August 1893 – 17 November 1959) was a 20th-century British zoologist.

== Life ==
He was born in the village of Bronant near Aberystwyth in Wales on 19 August 1893. He was educated at Tregaron County School.

In the First World War he served in the Royal Signal Corps and was wounded. In 1919 he began studying zoology at the University College of Wales graduating BSc in 1923. He then joined the staff of Robert Thomson Leiper at the Institute of Agricultural Parasitology in London. Later he was transferred to their research facility at Winches Farm in St Albans. In 1924 he undertook a study of potato root eelworm in Lincolnshire. From 1926 he specialised in studying nematode in domestic animals such as sheep and goats.

In 1933 he went to Edinburgh to lecture in Helminthology at the Dick Vet College.

In 1936 he was elected a Fellow of the Royal Society of Edinburgh. His proposers were James Hartley Ashworth, Charles Henry O'Donoghue, Alfred E. H. Cameron, and Arthur Craig Bennett.

In 1952 he left Edinburgh to take a post lecturing in Animal Pathology and Parasitology at Cambridge Veterinary School.

He died suddenly in Cambridge on 17 November 1959.

== Publications ==
- Molecular Biology of the Cell
- The Cell Cycle: Principles of Control

== Family ==
He was married with two daughters.
