= Andrew D. Morgan =

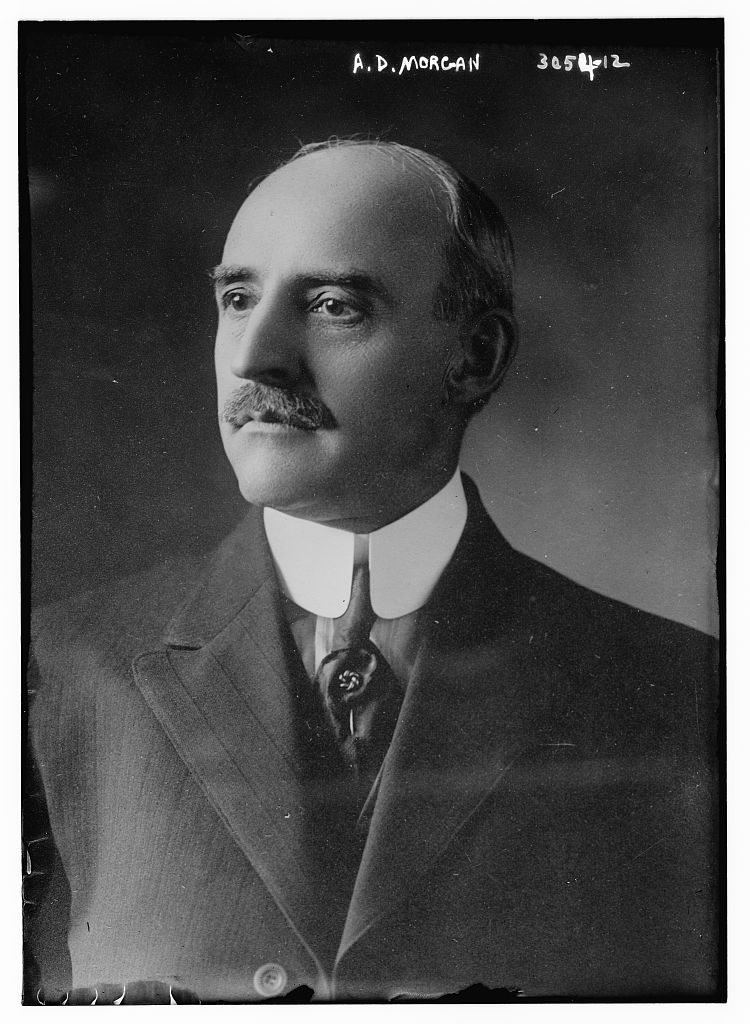

Andrew D. Morgan (December 1859 – December 15, 1934) was a lawyer and president of Ilion, New York, and chairman of the New York State Hospital Commission from March 27, 1914, to April 21, 1921.

== Biography ==
He was born in December 1859 to Mary J. Morgan who was a widow by the year 1900. He had a sister named Mina Morgan. Andrew married Ann and had a son, Miles Morgan He died on December 15, 1934.
