= David Morgan (composer) =

British composer (1933–1988)

David Morgan (1933 - 1988) was a British composer.

== Life and career ==
Morgan was born in Harpenden, Hertfordshire in 1933. In 1961 he began his studies at the Royal Academy of Music, with Alan Bush (composition) and Leighton Lucas (orchestration). He was awarded ten prizes for his compositions between 1961 and 1965 including the Eric Coates Prize.

After receiving a British Council Scholarship, David Morgan moved to Prague to study at the Academy of Music under Vaclav Dobias. During this period he wrote his Violin Concerto, which was premiered at the Dvořák Hall in Prague. He returned to England in 1967 after which a number of his lighter works were produced by the BBC Light Music Department.

In 1974 the violinist Erich Gruenberg performed his Violin Concerto with the Royal Philharmonic Orchestra, conducted by Sir Charles Groves at the Royal Festival Hall in London. Morgan's Sinfonia da Requiem was performed there later in the same year. Two of his major works were recorded by Lyrita in 1976 - the Violin Concerto (with Erich Gruenberg) and Contrasts, performed by the RPO conducted by Vernon Handley. In 1977 Vic Lewis conducted his orchestral movement Black on the RCA LP Colours.

In 1981 Morgan moved to Canada. He worked as a composer for symphonic wind band, and continued to receive commissions from Britain, including his orchestral Variations on a Theme of Walton. 1984 marked the Canadian Premiere of his Partita by the Kingston Symphony Orchestra and 1986 and 1987 saw the world premiere of Interludes and Canzonas for brass quintet and the Canadian premiere of Concerto for Wind Orchestra.

David Morgan died in Belleville, Canada in 1988.

== Selected works ==
=== Orchestral ===
- Violin Concerto, 1966
- Sinfonia da Requiem, 1971–72
- Partita, 1972
- Contrasts, 1974
- Black segment, in the collective work "Colours", by Vic Lewis and al. (1977)
- Cello Concerto, 1981
- Variations on a Theme of Walton, 1981–84
- Sonata for chamber orchestra, 1985
- Clarinet Concerto
- Concerto da Camera; Music for Children
- Overture for a Festive Occasion
- Serenade for string orchestra; Spring Carnival
- Threnody for string orchestra
- Concerto for Wind Orchestra

=== Vocal ===
- I Loved a Lass, for mixed choir, 1948
- Seven Nursery Rhymes, for voice and piano (1952)
- Three Tudor Lyrics, for mixed choir (1964)
- Four English Folk Songs, for soloists, mixed choir and guitar (1965)

=== Chamber and instrumental ===
- Piano Sonata, 1960
- Oboe Quartet, 1962
- Trio for Seven, 1962
- Divertimento for brass, 1964
- String Quartet, 1964
- Interludes and Canzonas for brass, 1983
- Lyric Suite for guitar, 1987
- Fantasy Sonata for Flute, 1974 (written for flautist Susan Milan)
