= David Morgan (rugby union, born 1969) =

New Zealand rugby union player

- Full name: David James Morgan
- Born: 7 February 1969 (age 57)
- School: Sacred Heart College
- University: University of Otago

Rugby union career
- Position: Prop
Senior career
Years	Team	Apps	(Points)
1992–00	CS Bourgoin-Jallieu		
Provincial / State sides
Years	Team	Apps	(Points)
1989–90	Otago	9	(4)
1991	Wellington	5	(0)
Super Rugby
Years	Team	Apps	(Points)
2000	Blues	2	(0)

David James Morgan (born 7 February 1969) is a New Zealand former professional rugby union player.

== Biography ==
A native of Matamata, Morgan began boarding at Auckland's Sacred Heart College in 1982 and was a classmate of future All Black Craig Innes. He was an Auckland under-16 and secondary schools representative player.

Morgan, a specialist tighthead prop, captained NZ Colts in 1990 and toured Canada with the NZ development team that year, while also earning a place in the national trials held at Palmerston North Showgrounds. He played provincial rugby for Otago during his economics studies at the University of Otago and then competed briefly with Wellington.

From 1992 to 2000, Morgan played his rugby in France with CS Bourgoin-Jallieu and was a member of the club's 1996–97 European Challenge Cup-winning side, before receiving an offer from Gordon Hunter to sign for the Blues, which were after a replacement for the recently retired Olo Brown.

Morgan featured twice for the Blues during the 2000 Super 12 season, both times off the bench.
