= J. R. Morgan =

British classical scholar (born 1950)

John Robert Morgan FLSW (born 11 July 1950) is a British academic working at Swansea University in Wales. He is primarily known for writing books on Classics, and for contributing to a number of journals, often with colourful views.

== Career ==
Morgan attended Lincoln College, Oxford, from 1968 to 1975, where he achieved both M.A. and D.Phil qualifications.

Towards the beginning of his career, Morgan represented Lincoln College of The University of Oxford in the popular British student quiz show, University Challenge on ITV eventually reaching the semi-finals.

Morgan's research interests include ancient narrative literature, in particular the Greek and Roman novel. He has published many articles, chapters and books on the Classics. He is perhaps best known as being the co-editor of Greek Fiction in 1994, alongside Richard Stoneman, used at numerous universities.

Morgan was also a contributor to the 3rd edition of the Oxford Classical Dictionary, published 1996. He is preparing a Loeb Classical Library translation of Heliodorus' Aethiopica.

Morgan is believed to have coined the terms "stethophone", "misatelist", "eulexia" and "misoxenist". "Intertextuality" is a word frequently used by Morgan in his lectures, as well as "metaliterary", a new fan favourite among his students.

Morgan was elected a Fellow of the Learned Society of Wales in 2018.

== Books ==
- Greek Fiction: The Greek novel in context, ed. J. R. Morgan and R. Stoneman (London & New York, 1994).
- Heliodorus, Ethiopian story. Translated by Sir Walter Lamb, edited with new introduction and notes by J. R. Morgan (London, 1997).
- Longus: Daphnis and Chloe, with an introduction, translation and notes by J. R. Morgan (Aris & Phillips Classical Texts, 2004)
