= James H. Morgan (politician) =

California politician

James H. Morgan served as a member of the 1861–1862 California State Assembly, representing the 4th District.
