= Andrew Morgan (cricketer) =

English cricketer

Personal information
- Full name: Andrew Howard Morgan
- Born: 30 November 1945 (age 80); Ore, Sussex, England
- Batting: Left-handed
- Role: Wicket-keeper

Domestic team information
- Years: Team
- 1966–1969: Oxford University

Career statistics
Competition	First-class
Matches	11
Runs scored	381
Batting average	23.81
100s/50s	–/1
Top score	59*
Catches/stumpings	9/–
- Source: Cricinfo, 29 March 2020

Andrew Howard Morgan (born 30 November 1945) is an English former first-class cricketer.

Morgan was born at Hastings in November 1945. He later studied at St Edmund Hall, Oxford where he played first-class cricket for Oxford University. He made his debut against Gloucestershire at Oxford in 1966. He played first-class cricket for Oxford until 1969, making eleven appearances. He scored 381 runs in his eleven appearances, at an average of 23.81 and a high score of 59 not out.
