= David Lee Morgan Jr. =

American sportswriter, author, teacher and motivational speaker (born 1965)

David Lee Morgan Jr. (born 1965) is an American sportswriter, author, teacher and motivational speaker.

Morgan has worked at several newspapers, including the Warren Tribune-Chronicle, the Raleigh News & Observer, the Youngstown Vindicator, the Binghamton Press & Sun Bulletin, and the Akron Beacon Journal. He was also a reporter for WYTV-Channel 33 in Youngstown, Ohio, an ABC affiliate.

During his 15 years with the Akron Beacon Journal, Morgan covered high school sports, the University of Akron athletics, the Cleveland Cavaliers and helped cover the Cleveland Indians during their 1997 World Series run. Morgan also covered NBA player LeBron James extensively, from his AAU participation in sixth grade to his high school playing career.

Morgan is the author of six sports books, including the first biography of LeBron James. He has appeared on the ESPN program Outside the Lines, the 2008 documentary film More Than a Game, and the Disney XD series Becoming.

Morgan is a member of the National Association of Black Journalists (NABJ).

== Personal life ==
Morgan was born in Warren, Ohio and has four children, David Lee Morgan III (Tre), Christian, Brooke, and Cameron Morgan. He also has one grandson, Avery Morgan. David is married to Jill (Blatt) Morgan. He received a bachelor's degree in Professional Writing & Editing with a minor in Journalism from Youngstown State University.

== Books ==
- LeBron James: The Rise of a Star, (October 16, 2003) ISBN 978-1886228740
- More Than a Coach: What It Means to Play for Coach, Mentor, and Friend Jim Tressel, (July 1, 2009) ISBN 978-1600782381
- High School Heroes: Stories of Inspiration, Dedication, and Hope, (September 7, 2009) ISBN 978-1931968669
- A Ring For The King: King James, Shaq, and The Quest for an NBA Championship, (October 1, 2009) ISBN 1600783279
- Kelly "The Ghost" Pavlik: The Pride of Youngstown, (Co-Written with Greg Gulas, 2009)
- Game Changers: The Greatest Plays in Ohio State Football History, (August 31, 2010) ISBN 978-1600782664
