= Thomas Morgan =

Thomas Morgan may refer to:

== Arts and entertainment ==
- Thomas P. Morgan (1864–1928), American writer, editor and poet
- Thomas Timothy Garfield Morgan (1931-2009), English actor
- Thomas Morgan (bassist) (born 1981), American jazz bassist

== Military ==
- Sir Thomas Morgan, 1st Baronet (1604–1679), Welsh general of the English Civil War
- Thomas Morgan (navy chaplain) (1769–1851), Welsh navy chaplain
- Thomas Jefferson Morgan (1839–1902), American brevet brigadier general
- Thomas R. Morgan (1930–2024), US Marine Corps General

== Law and politics ==
- Thomas Morgan (MP died 1565), English MP for Monmouthshire
- Thomas Morgan (died 1595) (1542–1595), Welsh MP for Shaftesbury and Wilton
- Thomas Morgan (of Llantarnam) (1546–1606), Welsh confidant and spy of Mary Stuart, Queen of Scots
- Thomas Morgan (MP died 1603), Welsh MP for Monmouthshire
- Thomas Morgan (of Machen) (c. 1589–1664/6), English politician
- Thomas Morgan (of Dderw) (1664–1700), Welsh politician, MP for Brecon and Monmouthshire
- Sir Thomas Morgan, 3rd Baronet (1684–1716), British MP for Herefordshire
- Thomas Morgan (judge advocate) (1702–1769), Welsh lawyer and politician
- Thomas Morgan (of Rhiwpera) (1727–1771), Welsh politician, MP for Brecon and Monmouthshire
- Thomas E. Morgan (1906–1995), U.S. representative from Pennsylvania

== Other ==
- Thomas Morgan (deist) (died 1743), Welsh philosopher
- Thomas Charles Morgan (1783–1843), English physician and writer
- Thomas J. Morgan (1847–1912), English-born American labor leader and socialist political activist
- Thomas Morgan (Afanwyson) (1850–1939), Welsh writer, historian and Baptist minister
- Thomas Henry Morgan (1857–1940), American architect in Georgia
- Thomas Hunt Morgan (1866–1945), American geneticist and embryologist
- T. J. Morgan (Thomas John, 1907–1986), Welsh academic
- Thomas Morgan (bishop) (born 1941), Canadian Anglican bishop
- Thomas Morgan (footballer) (born 1977), Irish footballer

== See also ==
- Tom Morgan (disambiguation)
- Thomas Morgan (OnlyFans Creator)
