= Edward Morgan (choreographer) =

American dancer and choreographer

Edward Morgan is an American dancer and choreographer. Morgan was a principal dancer at The Joffrey Ballet, and then a director of Joffrey II (1995–1997). He founded the MorganScott Ballet company with Daniel Scott in 1997; it became The EdwardMorgan Ballet in 2007.

== Career ==
Poster for The EdwardMorgan Ballet, 2010, shows the type of dance and image that Morgan intended to project.

=== The Joffrey Ballet ===
Morgan was a principal dancer of The Joffrey Ballet for ten years. In 1977, he notably performed "Touch Me", a male solo. The solo was revived in 1989, when the Los Angeles Times wrote that it "showed Morgan to be a dancer of great power and versatility", and that "Morgan's performance gave the borrowed dance-rhetoric superb immediacy". The Chicago Tribune noted Morgan's performance in 'Trinity' in 1990, with choreographer and dancer Edward Stierle "teaming up with unforgettable gusto with the lanky, lightning-quick Edward Morgan." Morgan was a director of the Joffrey II from 1995 to 1997.

=== Dance education for children ===
In 1998, Morgan founded the Joffrey Ballet School Jazz Program, offering children a professional training in dance. In 2000, Morgan and Daniel Scott set up a program to teach ballet to children in the Bronx district of New York.

=== The MorganScott Ballet ===
In 1997, Morgan and Daniel Scott founded The MorganScott Ballet company; Morgan worked as company director and choreographer. Morgan choreographed ClubMTV, creating over 30 works for the show, where he showcased and launched designers such as Dolce & Gabbana, Emporio Armani, and Nicole Miller, to name a few.

Morgan's energy as a choreographer was noticed by The New York Times critic Jennifer Dunning at MorganScott's debut, where the quality of the dancing belied the company's financial situation: "The choreography was attractive and the dancers skillful and persuasive. But what stood out about the new venture was its sheer fun. If Edward Morgan and Daniel Scott could bottle the evening's warmth and bubbling spirits, they would have no trouble raising money to keep their company going." She went on: "It is clear from his choreography that Mr. Morgan knows his way around ballet. The performers were swept gently along in lyrical, ground-hugging waves of dance punctuated by high lifts". Morgan's choreographic skill is praised: "Mr. Morgan knows how to make his dancers look good, giving them plenty of delicate flourishes for their lyrical arms and fleeting emotional details that highlight the performers' engaging way of relating to one another on the stage."

In 2000, Morgan again impressed Jennifer Dunning, this time in an open-air performance at Bryant Park, where it poured with rain and the sound failed, but "Then came the magic as Mr. Morgan jumped onto the stage in a solo that looked like an improvised prayer. His long lean body, arms reaching up and, pressing into the pelting rain, echoed the long lines of the skyscrapers behind him. The image was unforgettably theatrical yet also poignant."

=== The EdwardMorgan Ballet ===
In 2007, Morgan and Scott's collaboration ended, and the company was renamed "The EdwardMorgan Ballet" under the direction of Joseph Alexander. From 2010, the website included a poster (see illustration) showing the image that the company intended to project.

TheEdwardMorganBallet has performed in Carnegie Hall, The Danny Kaye Playhouse, The Cathedral of St. John the Divine, Florence Gould Hall at the French Institute, and created the original Bryant Park Dance Festival and Ballet For The Homeless at The Holy Apostles Soup Kitchen. The company has also performed at the United Nations, and UNESCO in Paris, France.

In September 2023 for Fashion Dance Runway, Edward Morgan choreographed New York Fashion Week’s Latin Ignition at the Solomon R. Guggenheim Museum, produced by Emilio Estefan Jr., and starring Joseph Alexander.
