= John Arnold of Monmouthshire =

17th-century Welsh politician

John Arnold
- Born: c. 1635; Southwark, London, England
- Died: 1702
- Other name: John Arnold of Monmouthshire
- Occupations: Member of Parliament; Deputy Lieutenant; Captain of the county troops; Justice of the Peace
- Political party: Whig
- Relatives: Sir Edward Moore (grandfather)

John Arnold, widely known as John Arnold of Monmouthshire (c. 1635 – 1702), was an English Protestant politician and Whig MP. He was one of the most prominent people in the Welsh county of Monmouthshire in the late 17th century. Arnold represented the constituencies around Monmouth (known as the Monmouth Boroughs) and Southwark in Parliament in the 1680s and 1690s. Arnold was also a notable priest hunter during the religious persecution of the Catholic Church in Wales. His strongly anti-Catholic and Whiggist beliefs and private war against underground local Catholic priests, such as St David Lewis, and Recusant laity made Arnold a particularly unpopular and controversial figure in his native Monmouthshire. In his later years, his behaviour became increasingly eccentric, and he was widely believed to have faked an attempt on his own life. Amongst his close associates, particularly during the anti-Catholic moral panic and witch hunt based on the conspiracy theory known as the Popish Plot, were fellow Whigs Titus Oates and Lord Shaftesbury. More recently, Jan Morris dubbed Arnold, "the most ferocious... of all the persecutors of the Catholics in Wales".

== Early life ==
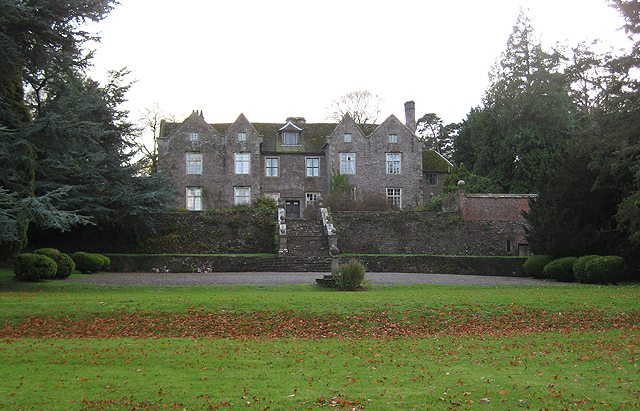
Llanvihangel Court, seat of John Arnold of Monmouthshire

Arnold was born in Southwark, around 1635, the first son of Nicholas Arnold of Llanvihangel Crucorney and his wife Lettice Moore, and the maternal grandson of Sir Edward Moore of Drogheda, County Louth. The Arnold family had their seat in Llanthony Priory by the end of the 16th century but had to lease it to the Hoptons owing to financial difficulties. Llanvihangel Court became the family seat and John succeeded his father in 1665. Educated in Southwark, he became Sheriff of Monmouthshire in 1669.

Arnold was made a deputy lieutenant, captain of the county troops, and Justice of the Peace in 1677 by Henry Somerset, 3rd Marquess of Worcester. However, Worcester formed a strong dislike for Arnold, and a lifelong feud began between them when Worcester had him "turned out of the commission of the peace for opposing his candidate at a by-election and generally 'affronting' him". Arnold, who was starting to exhibit signs of paranoia, blamed Edward Colman, secretary to the future King James II, and went up to London to challenge him to a duel. In fact Colman, who has been described as "the typical courtier and man about town", had no interest in events on the remote Welsh border, and it is most unlikely that he was to blame.

== Popish Plot period ==
Arnold's popularity declined further in March 1678 when he raided the Cwm Jesuit college in Llanrothal, Herefordshire with Border Protestants such as Herbert Croft, Bishop of Hereford, and Charles Price during the Popish Plot. Arnold reportedly gave some of his harshest criticism to its steward, Henry Milbourne, describing him as an "undoubted Papist" who only "held lands worth £100 per annum in one county, but is made justice of the peace in four". He denounced Milbourne in the House of Commons but with little success; several MPs believed Arnold's report was poorly constructed and some believed that the lord-lieutenant was a Catholic activist in south Wales. On 17 November 1678, Arnold also captured Father David Lewis, also known as Charles Baker, at St Michael's Church in Llantarnam. Father Lewis spent the night "in an upper room under John Arnold's roof" at Llanvihangel Court. He was then taken to Monmouth Gaol and was executed on 27 August 1679 after a trial at Usk. He was a much loved figure locally and his execution caused widespread dismay.

In the winter of 1678–9, Arnold was restored to the bench at the request of Worcester's son, Lord Herbert. Arnold, Lord Herbert, William Morgan, and the Bishop of Llandaff, began hunting down Roman Catholics in Monmouthshire, with Arnold offering a personal bounty of £200 to anybody who would capture a Catholic priest and send them to him. Amongst those brought to him was the Jesuit David Lewis, and the college of Jesuits at the Cwm was also raided. In the second general election of 1679, Arnold stood for Monmouth but lost to Lord Herbert and was admitted to the Green Ribbon Club in November of that year. The election result was overturned on petition in 1680, and Arnold was seated for Monmouth instead of Lord Herbert. He continued to fight the Catholics and complained in parliament about the Monmouthshire justices failing to enforce the Penal Laws. Arnold fell into disrepute with the Catholic Herberts of Coldbrook around this time. Arnold was also responsible for prosecuting and executing Philip Evans on the testimony of three witnesses he found.

Arnold was again at the centre of controversy in April 1680 when he was apparently the victim of an attack by a Catholic, John Giles, who (Arnold alleged) tried to stab him to death in Bell Yard, off Fleet Street, London, avenging the execution of the priests in Monmouthshire. Although Giles was found guilty and fined £500, some believed that Herbert of Coldbrook was the culprit and many believed (as do most modern historians) that Arnold invented the affair as an attempt to revive the Popish plot, and make himself a popular hero. He became known to his enemies thereafter as "cut-throat Arnold". Later that year, in October 1680, Arnold gave evidence in the House of Lords against the former Portuguese Jewish ambassador to London, Francesco de Feria, who was alleged to have been involved in a plot to kill the Earl of Shaftesbury, Titus Oates, William Bedloe and Arnold. In November, Arnold and John Dutton Colt were described by Thomas Bruce as "the most noisy, impudent and ignorant" Members of the Parliament.

In January 1681, Arnold supported the case for removing the Earl of Halifax and Laurence Hyde from the King's counsels. At this time he was given a large armed guard to protect him during his travels to Oxford against Papist attacks. In September 1681, Feria claimed that Arnold had offered him £300 to testify that he had seen the Marquess of Worcester at mass at the Portuguese Embassy and alleged that Arnold had called the king a Papist. His sanity was increasingly questioned, and it was said he would attack complete strangers in the street, accusing them of being Papists. He was infuriated by the decision to create his arch-enemy Worcester as Duke of Beaufort, which he took as a personal insult.

== Court case and fall ==
In 1682, he reportedly said "the Marquess of Worcester is a Papist and as deeply concerned in the Popish Plot and as guilty of endeavouring to introduce Popery and the subversion of the Protestant religion as any of the Jesuits that justly suffered for it, and I doubt not but to make the said Marquess and his crooked-back son to suffer for it in time". For this, he was brought to trial in the King's Bench, along with Sir Trevor Williams, for Scandalum Magnatum by the Marquess of Worcester, newly created Duke of Beaufort, whom he had also accused of harbouring Papists in Chepstow. He was fined £10,000, an exorbitant figure at that time. Unable to pay, Arnold was imprisoned until 1686.

== Later life ==
In the general election of 1689, Arnold stood for Southwark and formed an electoral alliance with the Tory, Sir Peter Rich. From 1695 to 1698 he was again MP for Monmouth but he continued to be very unpopular due to his extreme views. Under William III, Arnold remained a court Whig and was replaced by his son after his death in 1702 during the Monmouthshire taxation commission. Arnold's estates were sold in 1726.

== Family ==
He married Margaret, the daughter of William Cooke of Highnam, Gloucestershire and had 3 sons and 2 daughters. They lived at Llanvihangel Court, which was sold by his successor in 1726.

Parliament of England
Preceded by Lord Herbert	Member of Parliament for Monmouth; 1680–1685	Succeeded by Marquess of Worcester
Preceded by Sir James Herbert	Member of Parliament for Monmouth; January 1689 – February 1689	Succeeded by John Williams
Preceded by Sir Peter Daniel; Anthony Bowyer	Member of Parliament for Southwark; 1689–1695; With: Sir Peter Rich 1689–1690; Anthony Bowyer 1690–1695	Succeeded by Sir Charles Cox; Anthony Bowyer
Preceded by Sir Charles Kemeys, Bt	Member of Parliament for Monmouth; 1695–1698	Succeeded by Henry Probert
