= Thomas Pury (younger) =

- Born: 1619
- Died: 1693, age 73
- Education: Magdalen Hall, Oxford
- Occupation: Politician
- Known for: MP for Monmouth Boroughs in the Long Parliament

Thomas Pury (1619 – 1693) was an English politician who sat in the House of Commons from 1640 to 1653. He supported the Parliamentarian cause in the English Civil War.

== History ==
Pury was the son of Thomas Pury of Gloucestershire. He matriculated at Magdalen Hall, Oxford on 18 November 1635 aged 16. He was admitted at Grays Inn on 29 January 1641. He was employed by Mr Townshend of Staples Inn in 1642 and was receiver of King's rents in Gloucestershire and Wiltshire. He was clerk of peace for Gloucestershire and Captain of foot and horse in the parliamentary army.

In December 1646, Pury was elected Member of Parliament for Monmouth Boroughs in the Long Parliament. He survived Pride's Purge and sat in the Rump Parliament.

Pury died at the age of 73.

Pury married Barbara Kyrle daughter of James Kyrle of Walford.

Parliament of England
Preceded by Sir Thomas Trevor, 1st Baronet	Member of Parliament for Monmouth Boroughs; 1646–1653	Succeeded by Not represented in Barebones Parliament
Preceded by Nathaniel Waterhouse	Member of Parliament for Monmouth Boroughs; 1659	Succeeded by Sir Trevor Williams, 1st Baronet
