= Probert =

Probert is a patronymic name derived from the Welsh ap Robert, meaning "son of Robert", the name Robert having become widespread following the Norman Conquest.

Notable people with the name include:

- A. C. Probert (1862–1918), American swindler and confidence man
- Andrew Probert (born 1946), American artist
- Ann Probert (born 1938), American golfer
- Arthur Probert (1907–1975), British politician
- Belinda Probert (born 1949), Australian social scientist
- Billy Probert (1893–1948), English footballer
- Bob Probert (1965–2010), Canadian ice hockey player
- Carl Probert (born 1975), Fijian swimmer
- David Probert (born 1988), Welsh jockey
- Duncan Probert (1961–2016), British medieval scholar
- Eric Probert, English footballer
- George Probert (1927–2015), American jazz musician
- George Probert (MP) (1617–1677), Welsh politician
- Henry Probert (1926–2007), British military historian
- Henry Probert (barrister), Welsh anti-Catholic activist and politician
- Lee Probert (born 1972), English football referee
- Lynn Probert (1912–1981), Welsh lawn bowler
- Marion Probert (1933–1965), American football player and surgeon
- Michelle Probert (born 1960), British athlete
- Paul Probert, New Zealand footballer
- Philomen Probert (born 1950), English philologist
- Rebecca Probert (born 1973), British legal historian
- Rhys Probert (1921–1980), British aerospace engineer
- Tom Probert (born 1986), English cricketer
