= Sir Thomas Powell, 1st Baronet =

Welsh politician (died 1720)

Sir Thomas Powell, 1st Baronet (c. 1665 – 22 August 1720), of Broadway, Laugharne, Carmarthenshire and Coldbrook Park, Abergavenny, Monmouthshire, was a Welsh lawyer and politician.

He was the only son of the Carmarthenshire judge Sir John Powell, of Pentre Meyrick, Llanwrda and Broadway and was educated at St Catharine's College, Cambridge. He studied law at the Middle Temple from 1681, was called to the Bar in 1687 and made reader in 1702.

He was made a baron in 1698.

He became recorder of Oswestry in 1698 and attorney-general on the Carmarthen circuit from 1695 to 1715. He was created a baronet in 1698.

He was a member (MP) of the parliament of England for Monmouth Boroughs from 1705 to 1708. In the Parliament of Great Britain he was MP for Carmarthenshire from 1710 to 1715.

He married twice; firstly Elizabeth, daughter of Thomas Mansel of Briton Ferry, Glamorgan, and secondly Judith, the daughter and heiress of Sir James Herbert, of Coldbrook Park. He left a son, who died a year after himself, and several daughters.

Parliament of England
Preceded by John Morgan	Member of Parliament for Monmouth Boroughs; 1705–1707	Succeeded by Parliament of Great Britain
Parliament of Great Britain
Preceded by Parliament of England	Member of Parliament for Monmouth Boroughs; 1707–1708	Succeeded by Clayton Milborne
Preceded by Griffith Rice	Member of Parliament for Carmarthenshire; 1710–1715	Succeeded by Marquess of Winchester
Baronetage of England
New creation	Baronet (of Broadway); 1698–1720	Succeeded by Herbert Powell
