= Charles Somerset =

Charles Somerset may refer to:

- Charles Somerset, 1st Earl of Worcester (1460–1526), 1st Earl of Worcester and husband of Henry VIII's mistress, Elizabeth Browne
- Charles Somerset (MP for Monmouthshire) (died 1599), MP for Monmouthshire
- Charles Somerset, Marquess of Worcester (1660–1698), eldest son of Henry Somerset, 1st Duke of Beaufort
- Charles Somerset, 4th Duke of Beaufort (1709–1756), younger son of Henry Somerset, 2nd Duke of Beaufort
- Lord Charles Somerset (1767–1831), British soldier, politician and colonial administrator, governor of the Cape Colony
- Charles Somerset, 8th Duke of Beaufort (1824–1899), British peer, soldier, and politician
