= Robert Johnson (English politician) =

English politician (1530s–1622)

Sir Robert Johnson
- Born: c 1537
- Died: 1622
- Occupation: Politician

Sir Robert Johnson (c.1537 – 1622) was an English politician who sat in the House of Commons from 1597 to 1614.

He was the eldest son of William Johnson of Crawley, Buckinghamshire.

He was a surveyor and succeeded to the properties at Crawley on the death of his father in 1558. He was Keeper of Gawle, Forest of Dean in 1591. In 1597, he was elected Member of Parliament for Monmouth Boroughs where he was named to committees on weights and measures and pawnbrokers. He was re-elected MP for Monmouth in 1601 and took a strong line in parliament then on temperance issues. He proposed, for example, on 3 November that innkeepers who failed to restrain habitual drinkers should suffer corporal punishment.

In 1602 he was Clerk of Deliveries of the Ordnance and was knighted on 10 July 1604. In 1604 and again in 1614 he was re-elected MP for Monmouth.

He died in the first half of 1622. He had married Marion who died in 1585 and had three sons.

Parliament of England
| Preceded by Edward Hubberd | Member of Parliament for Monmouth Boroughs; 1597–1614 | Succeeded by Thomas Ravenscroft |
