= Charles Somerset, Marquess of Worcester =

English nobleman and politician

Marquess of Worcester
- Born: 25 December 1660
- Died: 13 July 1698 (aged 37)
- Spouse: Rebecca Child
- Issue: Henry Somerset, 2nd Duke of Beaufort; Lady Henrietta Somerset
- Father: Henry Somerset, 1st Duke of Beaufort
- Mother: Mary Capell

Charles Somerset, Marquess of Worcester (25 December 1660 – 13 July 1698) was an English nobleman and politician.

He was the eldest surviving son of Henry Somerset, 1st Duke of Beaufort and Mary Capell, and was styled Lord Herbert of Raglan from 1667 until 1682 and Marquess of Worcester thereafter. He attended Christ Church, Oxford University, matriculated in 1677 and was awarded an MA in 1682.

== Career ==
He was elected the youngest ever (aged 12) fellow of the Royal Society in June 1673.

He was Commissioner for Assessment for Brecon from 1677 to 1679) and for Gloucestershire, Middlesex, Monmouth and Brecon from 1689 to 1690. In 1681 he travelled to the Netherlands.

He was appointed colonel of militia for Bristol (1682–1685) and was a member of the Council of Wales and the Marches] (1682–1689) under his father as lord president. He commanded the Glamorgan Militia in 1684 when his father inspected them. He was appointed Custos Rotulorum of Radnorshire (1682–1689) and deputy lieutenant of Monmouthshire (1683–1687), Wiltshire (1683–1688) and Gloucestershire (1685–1687).

He was a member of the Committee of the Honourable East India Company (1683–1691). He was colonel of a regiment of foot (1685–1687) and MP for Monmouthshire (1685–1687 and 1689–1695).

== Private life ==
On 6 June 1682, he married Rebecca Child, who was the daughter of Sir Josiah Child of Wanstead, 1st Baronet and aunt of Richard Child, 1st Earl Tylney. They had at least two children:

1. Henry Somerset, 2nd Duke of Beaufort, his heir and his father's successor; and
2. Lady Henrietta Somerset, who was born on 27 August 1690, died on 9 August 1726 and was married to Charles Fitzroy, 2nd Duke of Grafton on 30 April 1713, with whom she had four sons and three daughters.

After his death in a coach accident in 1698 he was buried in Raglan. Charles predeceased his father and, on the duke's death, the dukedom passed to Charles's son Henry. His widow remarried the Hon John Granville in 1703.

Parliament of England
Preceded by Sir George Probert	Member of Parliament for Monmouth; 1677–1679	Succeeded by Sir Trevor Williams, Bt
Preceded by William Morgan; Sir Trevor Williams, Bt	Member of Parliament for Monmouthshire; 1679; With: William Morgan	Succeeded by William Morgan; Sir Trevor Williams, Bt
Preceded by Sir Trevor Williams, Bt	Member of Parliament for Monmouth; 1679–1680	Succeeded by John Arnold
Preceded by Evan Seys; Sir Charles Berkeley	Member of Parliament for Gloucester; 1681–1685; With: Sir Charles Berkeley	Succeeded by John Wagstaffe; John Powell
Preceded by John Arnold	Member of Parliament for Monmouth; 1685	Succeeded by Sir James Herbert
Preceded by Sir John Guise, Bt; Sir Ralph Dutton, Bt	Member of Parliament for Gloucestershire; 1685–1689; With: Sir Robert Atkyns	Succeeded by Sir John Guise, Bt; Sir Ralph Dutton, Bt
Preceded by Sir Trevor Williams, Bt; Sir Edward Morgan, Bt	Member of Parliament for Monmouthshire; 1685–1695; With: Sir Charles Kemeys, Bt 1685–89; Sir Trevor Williams, Bt 1689–90; Thomas Morgan 1690–95	Succeeded by Thomas Morgan; Sir Charles Kemeys, Bt
Military offices
Preceded by The Duke of Beaufort	Colonel of the Marquess of Worcester's Regiment of Foot; 1685–1687	Succeeded by Viscount Montgomery
Honorary titles
Preceded by Sir Edward Harley	Custos Rotulorum of Radnorshire; 1685–1689	Succeeded by Sir Rowland Gwynne
