= John Morgan (merchant) =

Welsh merchant, sheriff and MP

John Morgan (c. 1641–1 January 1715) was a Welsh merchant, sheriff and MP (for Monmouth Boroughs).

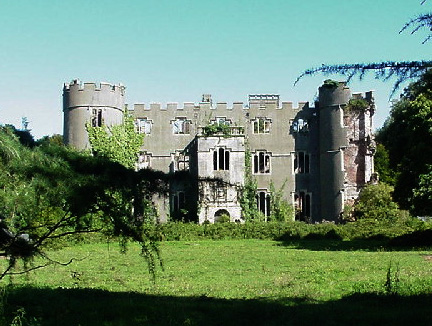
Rhiwperra Castle (Ruperra Castle)

He was born the fourth son of Sir Thomas Morgan (of Machen) and established himself as a London merchant, acquiring a large fortune trading with the West Indies. His brother was William Morgan.

Determined to leave London and return to his native shire he purchased Rhiwperra Castle from a cousin as his home for 12,400 pounds. He was appointed High Sheriff of Monmouthshire in 1697.

In 1701 he was elected to Parliament to represent Monmouth Boroughs until 1705. In 1705 he contested and lost the election for knight of the shire (MP) for Monmouthshire.

He died in 1715 and was buried at Machen, Monmouthshire. He never married and left his estate to his nephew John Morgan (of Rhiwpera), whereby it became part of estates of the Tredegar Morgans.

Parliament of England
Preceded by Henry Probert	Member of Parliament for Monmouth Boroughs; 1701–1705	Succeeded by Sir Thomas Powell, Bt
