= Henry Probert (barrister) =

Welsh anti-Catholic activist and politician

Henry Probert MP, JP
- Born: 1645?
- Died: 1719?
- Education: Jesus College, Oxford
- Occupations: Politician; Justice of the Peace
- Known for: Anti-Catholic activism
- Parent: George Probert

Henry Probert (1645? – 1719?) was a Welsh anti-Catholic activist and politician.

== Life ==
He was the son of George Probert, who married Magdalen, daughter of Charles Williams (of Llangibby). He was therefore nephew of Sir Trevor Williams; and shared his extreme Protestant views.

Probert matriculated at Jesus College, Oxford in 1663, and entered the Inner Temple in 1664. He lived at The Argoed, Penalt.

Probert was an associate of John Arnold of Monmouthshire in his campaign against local Catholics and the Jesuits. The two were twice removed as Justice of the Peace by the Marquess of Worcester, in 1677 and 1680, the second time being part of a larger purge of local magistrates by the Tory Worcester. At the beginning of this period Probert and Arnold were pressing the local justices to take action against practising Catholics. Probert assisted Arnold in his confrontation with Henry Milbourne. He was appointed High Sheriff of Monmouthshire for 1689–90.

When Arnold was elected as Member of Parliament for Monmouth Boroughs in 1695, in the Whig interest, it was on the understanding with supporters that he would make way for Probert. This he duly did, and in 1698 Probert served as MP there.
