= Joseph Tomlinson =

Joseph Tomlinson may refer to:

- Joseph Tomlinson (railway engineer) (1823–1894), British railway engineer and executive
- Joseph Tomlinson (civil engineer) (1816–1905), British-born Canadian-American bridge and lighthouse engineer

== See also ==
- Joe Tomlinson (born 2000), English footballer
