= Thomas Hughes (Welsh MP) =

Welsh politician

Thomas Hughes (1604 – 22 August 1664) was a Welsh politician who sat in the House of Commons in 1654 and 1659.

Hughes was the elder son of Thomas Hughes of Cillwch (d.1624). He was an active supporter of the Commonwealth. He was on the Parliamentary Committee for Monmouthshire in 1646 and was appointed Governor of Chepstow Castle before 1647. In 1653 he was prothonotary of the court of great sessions for Brecknock, Glamorgan and Radnorshire. In 1654, he was elected Member of Parliament for Monmouthshire in the First Protectorate Parliament. In 1659 he was elected MP for Carmarthenshire in the Third Protectorate Parliament. Thomas Hughes' brother Charles was a major in the Royalist army.

Hughes died at the age of 59 and was buried in Matherne Church.

Hughes married Isabel Godwin.

Parliament of England
Preceded by Richard Cromwell; Philip Jones; Henry Herbert	Member of Parliament for Monmouthshire; 1654; With: Henry Herbert; Thomas Morgan	Succeeded by Major General James Berry; John Nicholas; Edward Herbert
Preceded by John Claypole; Rowland Dawkins	Member of Parliament for Carmarthenshire; 1659	Succeeded by Not represented in Restored Rump
