= Moore Powell =

16th-century Welsh politician

Moore Powell (died c. 1573), of Monmouth, was a Welsh politician.

He was a member (MP) of the parliament of England for Monmouth Boroughs in 1559, 1563 and 1572.
