= Monmouth Boroughs =

UK Parliament constituency (1801–1918)

- Former borough constituency for the House of Commons

1545–1918
- Seats: one
- Replaced by: Monmouth and Newport

Monmouth Boroughs (also known as the Monmouth District of Boroughs) was a parliamentary constituency consisting of several towns in Monmouthshire. It returned one Member of Parliament (MP) to the House of Commons of the Parliaments of England, Great Britain, and finally the United Kingdom; until 1832 the constituency was known simply as Monmouth, though it included other "contributory boroughs".

== History and boundaries ==
The area was first enfranchised as the single-member borough of Monmouth or Monmouth Town in the reign of Henry VIII, at the same time as the counties and boroughs of Wales. On official, national-level paper cast as being in England its electoral arrangements from the outset resembled those of the Welsh boroughs rather than those in the rest of England - its single member and its other "contributory boroughs" in the same county, which were required to contribute to the members' expenses and which had the right to send voters to take part in the election at the county town. These were initially six or perhaps seven in number: Caerleon, Newport, Trellech, Usk, Chepstow, Abergavenny and possibly Grosmont; but by the late 17th century all of the electors were freemen of Monmouth, Usk and Newport.

The franchise was settled by a judgment in a disputed election in 1680, when Monmouth attempted to return a member to parliament without the involvement of the other boroughs, and the Court declared the right to vote to rest in the resident freemen of Monmouth, Newport and Usk. The number of electors fell away sharply during the 18th century - from 2,000 in 1715 to about 800 in the 1754-1790 period; by the time of the Great Reform Act in 1832 qualified voters numbered: 123 in Newport, 83 in Monmouth and 74 in Usk. In Tudor times the seat was under the influence of the Duchy of Lancaster and around the start of the 18th century it was a pocket borough of the Morgan family of Tredegar, who were influential in the Newport area; but soon afterwards the Dukes of Beaufort (a Scudamore family branch) gained control. After the Duke's candidate had won the election of 1715 decisively, this patronage was so clear contests ceased until 1820 – their candidates (many of them members of the family) were returned unopposed.

At the time of the Great Reform Act (or First Reform Act), 1832, Monmouth and Newport each had around 5,000 residents and Usk just over 1,000. This was great for most seats of its type – even dual-member boroughs were mostly kept if they had or could be simply drawn to exceed 4,000 residents. Nevertheless, all three parts of this seat were expanding by taking into the new high-rent-paying and/or landed outlook (franchise) a broad view of each town; such area took in 13,101 people and its electorate (under the "reformed" franchise) was 899. Henceforth it was generally referred to as the Monmouth Boroughs.

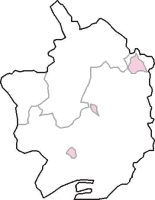
The constituency as it existed 1885-1918 (shown in pink) within Monmouthshire

From 1832 until 1906 results tended on 'marginal' rather than 'safe', alternating between Conservatives and Whigs/Liberals. Crawshay Bailey (Con.) was returned unopposed four times after he was first elected. The seat moved steadily towards the Liberals, however, as the franchise became more inclusive and Newport grew in size; by the turn of the century 90% of the electorate was there, and it was a mass-labour working class and mainly industrial town unlike Monmouth and Usk. The Conservatives won in their landslide year of 1900 and held the seat in the by-election when that election was voided for various irregularities, but were probably helped by the association of the Liberal candidate with the campaign to extend the Welsh Sunday Closing Act to Monmouthshire. After, it was identifiably "safely" Liberal, and at the time of the 1911 census had a population of 77,902.

The seat was abolished by the Representation of the People Act 1918: Newport became a parliamentary borough; Monmouth and Usk, mainstays of "Monmouth" county constituency.

== Boundary reforms ==
Redefined limits of the three contributory boroughs were set in 1832 and 1885.

== Members of Parliament ==
=== 1545-1640 ===
Parliament	First member
1542	Thomas Kynnyllyn
1545	Richard Morgan, also elected for Gloucester
1547	Giles Morgan
1553 (Mar)	(not known)
1553 (Oct)	John Philip Morgan
1554 (Apr)	John Philip Morgan
1554 (Nov)	John Philip Morgan
1555	Thomas Lewis
1558	Matthew Herbert
1559	Moore Powell
1562	Moore Powell
1571	Charles Herbert
1572	Moore Powell, died and replaced 1576 by Sir William Morgan
1584	Moore Gwillim
1586	Moore Gwillim
1588	Philip Jones
1593	Edward Hubberd
1597	Robert Johnson
1601	Robert Johnson
1604-1611	(Sir) Robert Johnson
1614	Sir Robert Johnson
1621-1622	Thomas Ravenscroft
1624	Walter Stewart or Steward
1625	Walter Stewart or Steward
1626	William Fortune
1628	William Morgan
1629–1640	No Parliaments summoned

=== 1640-1918 ===
Year	Member	Party
April 1640	Charles Jones (Note: Jones was also elected for Beaumaris, but had not chosen his seat before parliament was dissolved)	
November 1640	Disputed election - seat effectively vacant (Note: The election of November 1640 was disputed between William Watkins and Thomas Trevor. Watkins took his seat at the very beginning of the Parliament, but was then instructed to cease attending until the dispute had been resolved; in fact this had not happened by the time of the outbreak of the Civil War, and proceedings were then put in abeyance and neither ever gained the seat. Watkins was disabled from sitting for his adherence to the Royalist cause while Trevor was elected for another constituency, and a writ to fill the vacant seat was eventually issued in 1646.)	
1646	Thomas Pury	
1653	Monmouth was unrepresented in the Barebones Parliament and the First and Second Parliaments of the Protectorate	
January 1659	Nathaniel Waterhouse	
May 1659	Thomas Pury	
April 1660	Sir Trevor Williams	
1661	Sir George Probert	
1677	Charles Somerset	
February 1679	Sir Trevor Williams	
September 1679	Charles Somerset (Note: On petition, Herbert was declared not to have been duly elected, having been returned only by the freemen of Monmouth, and his opponent Arnold (who had the majority once the votes of Newport and Usk were included) was declared elected in his place)	
1680	John Arnold	Whig
April 1685	Charles Somerset	
June 1685	Sir James Herbert	
January 1689	John Arnold	Whig
February 1689	John Williams	
1690	Sir Charles Kemeys	
1695	John Arnold	Whig
1698	Henry Probert	
1701	John Morgan	
1705	Sir Thomas Powell	
1708	Clayton Milborne	
1715	William Bray	
1720	Andrews Windsor	
1722	Edward Kemeys	
1734	Lord Charles Somerset	
1745	Sir Charles Tynte	
1747	Fulke Greville	
1754	Benjamin Bathurst	
1767	(Sir) John Stepney (Note: Succeeded to a baronetcy, October 1772)	
1788	Henry Somerset (Note: Worcester was re-elected in 1790, but had also been elected for Bristol, which he chose to represent, and did not sit again for Monmouth)	Tory
1790	Charles Bragge	Tory
1796	Vice Admiral (Sir) Charles Thompson (Note: Created a baronet, 1797)	
1799	Lord Edward Somerset	Tory
1802	Lord Charles Somerset	Tory
1813	Henry Somerset	Tory
May 1831	Benjamin Hall (Note: On petition, Hall's election was overturned and the Marquess of Worcester declared re-elected in his place)	Whig
July 1831	Henry Somerset	Tory
1832	Benjamin Hall	Whig
1837	Reginald Blewitt	Whig
1852	Crawshay Bailey	Conservative
1868	Sir John Ramsden	Liberal
1874	Thomas Cordes	Conservative
1880	Edward Carbutt	Liberal
1886	Sir George Elliot	Conservative
1892	Albert Spicer	Liberal
1900	Dr Frederick Rutherfoord Harris (Note: On petition, the election of Harris was declared void and a by-election held)	Conservative
1901	Joseph Lawrence	Conservative
1906	Lewis Haslam	Liberal
1916	Lewis Haslam	Coalition Liberal
1918	constituency abolished	

== Election results ==
=== Elections in the 1830s ===
General election 1830: Monmouth Boroughs
Party	Candidate	Votes	%
Tory	Henry Somerset	Unopposed	
Tory hold			

General election 1831: Monmouth Boroughs
Party	Candidate	Votes	%
Whig	Benjamin Hall	168	53.0
Tory	Henry Somerset	149	47.0
Majority		19	6.0
Turnout		317	
Whig gain from Tory			

- On petition, Hall was unseated and Somerset was declared elected.

General election 1832: Monmouth Boroughs
Party	Candidate	Votes	%	±%
Whig	Benjamin Hall	393	52.5	−0.5
Tory	Henry Somerset	355	47.5	+0.5
Majority		38	5.0	−1.0
Turnout		748	83.2	
Registered electors		899		
Whig hold		Swing	−0.5	

General election 1835: Monmouth Boroughs
Party	Candidate	Votes	%	±%
Whig	Benjamin Hall	428	50.2	−2.3
Conservative	Joseph Bailey	424	49.8	+2.3
Majority		4	0.4	−4.6
Turnout		852	78.3	−4.9
Registered electors		1,088		
Whig hold		Swing	−2.3	

General election 1837: Monmouth Boroughs
Party	Candidate	Votes	%	±%
Whig	Reginald Blewitt	440	53.3	+3.1
Conservative	Joseph Bailey	386	46.7	−3.1
Majority		54	6.6	+6.2
Turnout		826	70.7	−7.6
Registered electors		1,169		
Whig hold		Swing	+3.1	

=== Elections in the 1840s ===
General election 1841: Monmouth Boroughs
Party	Candidate	Votes	%	±%
Whig	Reginald Blewitt	476	100.0	+46.7
Chartist	William Edwards	0	0.0	New
Majority		476	100.0	+93.4
Turnout		476	37.5	−33.2
Registered electors		1,268		
Whig hold		Swing	+46.7	

General election 1847: Monmouth Boroughs
Party	Candidate	Votes	%	±%
Whig	Reginald Blewitt	Unopposed		
Registered electors		1,420		
Whig hold				

=== Elections in the 1850s ===
Blewitt resigned by accepting the office of Steward of the Manor of Hempholme, causing a by-election.

By-election, 3 April 1852: Monmouth Boroughs
Party	Candidate	Votes	%	±%
Conservative	Crawshay Bailey	764	59.1	New
Whig	William Schaw Lindsay	529	40.9	N/A
Majority		235	18.2	N/A
Turnout		1,293	77.1	N/A
Registered electors		1,676		
Conservative gain from Whig		Swing	N/A	

General election 1852: Monmouth Boroughs
Party	Candidate	Votes	%	±%
Conservative	Crawshay Bailey	Unopposed		
Registered electors		1,676		
Conservative gain from Whig				

General election 1857: Monmouth Boroughs
Party	Candidate	Votes	%	±%
Conservative	Crawshay Bailey	Unopposed		
Registered electors		1,744		
Conservative hold				

General election 1859: Monmouth Boroughs
Party	Candidate	Votes	%	±%
Conservative	Crawshay Bailey	Unopposed		
Registered electors		1,745		
Conservative hold				

=== Elections in the 1860s ===
General election 1865: Monmouth Boroughs
Party	Candidate	Votes	%	±%
Conservative	Crawshay Bailey	Unopposed		
Registered electors		2,087		
Conservative hold				

General election 1868: Monmouth Boroughs
Party	Candidate	Votes	%	±%
Liberal	John William Ramsden	1,618	52.8	New
Conservative	Samuel Homfray	1,449	47.2	N/A
Majority		169	5.6	N/A
Turnout		3,067	81.3	N/A
Registered electors		3,771		
Liberal gain from Conservative		Swing	N/A	

=== Elections in the 1870s ===
General election 1874: Monmouth Boroughs
Party	Candidate	Votes	%	±%
Conservative	Thomas Cordes	2,090	59.1	+11.9
Liberal	Henry Pochin	1,447	40.9	−11.9
Majority		643	18.2	N/A
Turnout		3,537	75.2	−6.1
Registered electors		4,702		
Conservative gain from Liberal		Swing	+11.9	

=== Elections in the 1880s ===
General election 1880: Monmouth Boroughs
Party	Candidate	Votes	%	±%
Liberal	Edward Carbutt	2,258	50.7	+9.8
Conservative	Thomas Cordes	2,197	49.3	−9.8
Majority		61	1.4	N/A
Turnout		4,455	87.5	+12.3
Registered electors		5,090		
Liberal gain from Conservative		Swing	+9.8	

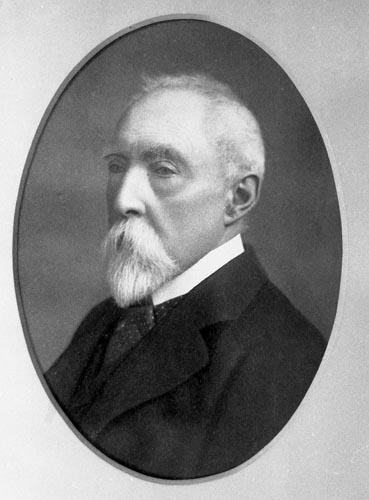
Carbutt

General election 1885: Monmouth Boroughs
Party	Candidate	Votes	%	±%
Liberal	Edward Carbutt	2,932	50.1	−0.6
Conservative	Thomas Cordes	2,921	49.9	+0.6
Majority		11	0.2	−1.2
Turnout		5,853	90.3	+2.8
Registered electors		6,485		
Liberal hold		Swing	−0.6	

General election 1886: Monmouth Boroughs
Party	Candidate	Votes	%	±%
Conservative	George Elliot	3,033	54.2	+4.3
Liberal	Edward Carbutt	2,568	45.8	−4.3
Majority		465	8.4	N/A
Turnout		5,601	86.4	−3.9
Registered electors		6,485		
Conservative gain from Liberal		Swing	+4.3	

=== Elections in the 1890s ===
General election 1892: Monmouth Boroughs
Party	Candidate	Votes	%	±%
Liberal	Albert Spicer	3,430	52.2	+6.4
Conservative	George Elliot	3,137	47.8	−6.4
Majority		293	4.4	N/A
Turnout		6,567	85.3	−1.1
Registered electors		7,697		
Liberal gain from Conservative		Swing	+6.4	

General election 1895: Monmouth Boroughs
Party	Candidate	Votes	%	±%
Liberal	Albert Spicer	3,743	51.1	−1.1
Conservative	Emanuel Maguire Underdown	3,589	48.9	+1.1
Majority		154	2.2	−2.2
Turnout		7,332	87.4	+2.1
Registered electors		8,391		
Liberal hold		Swing	−1.1	

=== Elections in the 1900s ===

General election 1900: Monmouth Boroughs
Party	Candidate	Votes	%	±%
Conservative	Frederick Rutherfoord Harris	4,415	54.2	+5.3
Liberal	Albert Spicer	3,727	45.8	−5.3
Majority		688	8.4	N/A
Turnout		8,142	87.2	−0.2
Registered electors		9,335		
Conservative gain from Liberal		Swing	+5.3	

Albert Spicer

1901 Monmouth Boroughs by-election
Party	Candidate	Votes	%	±%
Conservative	Joseph Lawrence	4,604	51.9	−2.3
Liberal	Albert Spicer	4,261	48.1	+2.3
Majority		343	3.8	−4.6
Turnout		8,865	90.4	+3.2
Registered electors		9,803		
Conservative hold		Swing	−2.3	

Lewis Haslam

General election 1906: Monmouth Boroughs
Party	Candidate	Votes	%	±%
Liberal	Lewis Haslam	4,531	44.7	−1.1
Conservative	Edward Emanuel Micholls	3,939	38.8	−15.4
Labour Repr. Cmte.	James Winstone	1,678	16.5	New
Majority		592	5.9	N/A
Turnout		10,148	90.6	+3.4
Registered electors		11,207		
Liberal gain from Conservative		Swing	+7.2	

=== Elections in the 1910s ===
General election January 1910: Monmouth Boroughs
Party	Candidate	Votes	%	±%
Liberal	Lewis Haslam	6,496	54.8	+10.1
Conservative	Charles Cayzer	5,351	45.2	+6.4
Majority		1,145	9.6	+3.7
Turnout		11,847	91.6	+1.0
Registered electors		12,934		
Liberal hold		Swing	+1.9	

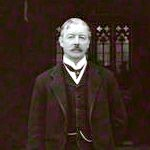
Lewis Haslam

General election December 1910: Monmouth Boroughs
Party	Candidate	Votes	%	±%
Liberal	Lewis Haslam	6,154	54.9	+0.1
Conservative	Gerald de La Pryme Hargreaves	5,056	45.1	−0.1
Majority		1,098	9.8	+0.2
Turnout		11,210	86.7	−4.9
Registered electors		12,934		
Liberal hold		Swing	+0.1	

General Election 1914–15:

Another General Election was required to take place before the end of 1915. The political parties had been making preparations for an election to take place and by July 1914, the following candidates had been selected;

- Liberal: Lewis Haslam
- Unionist:

== Notes and references ==
Notes

== Bibliography ==
- S T Bindoff, The History of Parliament: The House of Commons 1509-1558 (Secker & Warburg, 1982)
- D Brunton & D H Pennington, Members of the Long Parliament (London: George Allen & Unwin, 1954)
- The Constitutional Year Book for 1913 (London: National Union of Conservative and Unionist Associations, 1913)
- F W S Craig, British Parliamentary Election Results 1832-1885 (2nd edition, Aldershot: Parliamentary Research Services, 1989)
- P W Hasler, The History of Parliament: The House of Commons 1558-1603 (London: HMSO, 1981)
- Lewis Namier & John Brooke, The History of Parliament: The House of Commons 1754-1790 (London: HMSO, 1964)
- J. E. Neale, The Elizabethan House of Commons (London: Jonathan Cape, 1949)
- T. H. B. Oldfield, The Representative History of Great Britain and Ireland (London: Baldwin, Cradock & Joy, 1816)
- Henry Pelling, Social Geography of British Elections 1885-1910 (London: Macmillan, 1967)
- J Holladay Philbin, Parliamentary Representation 1832 - England and Wales (New Haven: Yale University Press, 1965)
- Romney Sedgwick, The History of Parliament: The House of Commons 1715-1754, (London: HMSO, 1970)
- Robert Walcott, English Politics in the Early Eighteenth Century (Oxford: Oxford University Press, 1956)
- Parliamentary Boundaries Act, 1832 (2 & 3 Will. 4 c.64), Schedule O
- Redistribution of Seats Act, 1885 (48 & 49 Vict c.23), Ninth Schedule
- W R Williams The Parliamentary History of the Principality of Wales
- Cobbett's Parliamentary history of England, from the Norman Conquest in 1066 to the year 1803 (London: Thomas Hansard, 1808)
- Leigh Rayment's Historical List of MPs – Constituencies beginning with "M" (part 3)
