= Griffith Rice =

Welsh politician

Member of Parliament for Carmarthenshire
- In office December 1701 – 1710
- Preceded by: Sir Rice Rudd, 2nd Baronet
- Succeeded by: Sir Thomas Powell, 1st Baronet

Personal details
- Born: circa. 1664
- Died: 26 September 1729
- Spouse: Catherine (née Hoby)
- Children: 2 sons, 5 daughters
- Parents: Walter Rice (father); Elizabeth (née Games) (mother)
- Education: Jesus College, Oxford

Griffith Rice (c. 1664 – 26 September 1729) was a Welsh politician who sat as MP for Carmarthenshire from December 1701 till 1710.

He was the first and only surviving son of Walter Rice and his wife Elizabeth (née Games). He was educated at Jesus College, Oxford and matriculated on 30 May 1682, at the age of 17. He married his first wife Catherine (née Hoby) and had two sons and five daughters.

== Parliamentary career ==
Griffith Rice served as sheriff of Carmarthenshire from 1693 till 1694. In December 1701, he was elected MP of Carmarthenshire. Although he entered parliament as a Tory he voted with the Whigs on several occasions, such as voting for the Foreign Protestants Naturalization Act 1708 and for the impeachement of Dr. Henry Sacheverell in 1710, which especially angered the Tories and he was defeated in 1710 when Sir Thomas Powell won his seat.
