= William Morgan (died 1583) =

Welsh soldier and politician

Sir William Morgan
- Born: c. 1542
- Died: 1583

Sir William Morgan (c. 1542 – 9 October 1583), of Langstone and Pencoed, Llanmartin, Monmouthshire, was a Welsh soldier and politician.

He served as a member of the parliament of England (MP) for Monmouth Boroughs in 1572.
