= Thomas Morgan (of Machen) =

Welsh politician

Sir Thomas Morgan
- Died: 1664
- Children: William Morgan (of Machen and Tredegar); John Morgan (merchant)

Sir Thomas Morgan (died 1664 or 1666) was a Welsh politician who sat in the House of Commons in 1654.

== Biography ==
Morgan was the eldest son of Sir William Morgan. He was admitted to Inner Temple in 1650.

In 1654, Morgan was elected Member of Parliament for Monmouthshire in the First Protectorate Parliament after two members chose to take up other seats.

Morgan died on either 13 May 1664 or 18 October 1666.

== Family ==
Morgan married firstly Rachel Kemys, widow of David Kemys and daughter of Robert Hopton. She was sister to Ralph Lord Hopton. He married secondly Elizabeth Windham, daughter of Francis or Thomas Windham of Sandhills Somerset.

== Notes ==
Parliament of England
Preceded by Richard Cromwell; Philip Jones; Henry Herbert	Member of Parliament for Monmouthshire; 1654; With: Henry Herbert; Thomas Hughes	Succeeded by Major General James Berry; John Nicholas; Edward Herbert
