= John Morgan (by 1524 – will proved 1559) =

Member of the Parliament of England

John Philip Morgan (by 1524 – will proved 1559), of Skenfrith, Monmouthshire, was a Welsh politician.

He was a member (MP) of the parliament of England for Monmouth Boroughs from 1553 to 1554.
