= Thomas Cordes =

Thomas Cordes (5 May 1826 – 16 Aug 1901) was a British Conservative Party politician.

He was the Member of Parliament for Monmouth Boroughs from 1874 to 1880,

Parliament of the United Kingdom
Preceded by Sir John Ramsden, Bt	Member of Parliament for Monmouth Boroughs; 1874–1880	Succeeded by Edward Carbutt
