= Thomas Kynnyllyn =

Thomas Kynnyllyn (1487/88–1544/58), of Monmouth, was a Welsh Member of Parliament (MP). He was a Member of the Parliament of England for Monmouth Boroughs in 1542.
