= William Anderson (engineer) =

British engineer and philanthropist

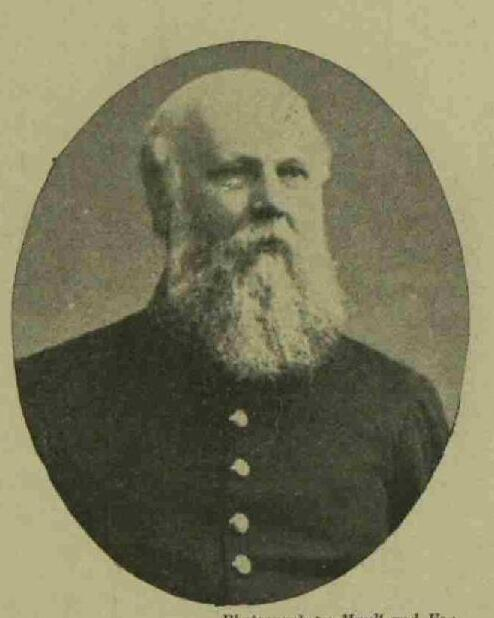
- Born: 5 January 1835; Saint Petersburg
- Died: 11 December 1898 (aged 63); Royal Arsenal
- Alma mater: King's College London
- Awards: Fellow of the Royal Society

Sir William Anderson, KCB (5 January 1835 at Saint Petersburg – 11 December 1898 at Woolwich Arsenal) was an English engineer who also served as director-general of the Ordnance Factories from 1889 to 1898.

== Early life ==
He was the fourth son of John Anderson (26 June 1796 - 22 January 1870), a member of the firm of Matthews, Anderson, & Co., bankers and merchants of Saint Petersburg, by his wife Frances, daughter of Dr. Simpson. He was educated at the Saint Petersburg high commercial school, of which he became head. He carried off the silver medal, and although an English subject received the freedom of the city in consideration of his attainments. When he left Russia in 1849 he was proficient in English, Russian, German, and French.

In 1849, he became a student in the Applied Sciences department at King's College, London, and on leaving became an associate. He next served a pupilage at the works of Sir William Fairbairn in Manchester, where he remained three years. In 1855 he joined the firm of Courtney, Stephens, & Co., of the Blackhall Place Ironworks, Dublin. There he did much general engineering work. He also designed several cranes, and was the first to adopt the braced web in bent cranes. In 1863 he became president of the Institution of Civil Engineers of Ireland.

== Career ==
In 1864 he joined the firm of Easton and Amos of the Grove, Southwark, and went to live at Erith, where the firm had decided to construct new works on a riverside site at Anchor Bay, east of Erith's centre. He became a partner, and eventually head, of the firm which at a later date was styled Easton and Anderson. At Erith he had the chief responsibility in designing and laying out the works. Part of the business of the firm at that time was the construction of pumping machinery. Anderson materially improved the pattern of centrifugal pump devised by John George Appold.

While in Erith, he also contributed to the establishment of local schools, serving for 27 years on the Erith School Board, which he chaired from 1886 until his death. He was also actively involved with local churches.

In 1870 he went to Egypt to erect three sugar mills for the Khedive Ismail, which he had helped to design. In 1872 he presented to the Institution of Civil Engineers an account of the sugar factory at Aba-el-Wakf (Minutes of Proceedings, 1872–3, xxxv. 37–70), for which he received a Watt medal and a Telford premium.

Anderson next turned his attention to gun mountings of the Moncrieff type, and designed several for the British government, which were made at the Erith works. In 1876 he designed twin Moncrieff turret mountings for 40-ton guns for the Russian admiralty, which were made at Erith and proved highly successful. Later he designed similar mountings for 50-ton guns for the same country, and about 1888 he designed the mountings for the battleship HMS Rupert.

About 1878–82 he was occupied with large contracts which his firm had obtained for the waterworks of Antwerp and Seville. To render the waters of the river Nethe, which was little better than a sewer, available for drinking purposes, he invented, in conjunction with Sir Frederick Augustus Abel, a revolving iron purifier, which proved perfectly effectual. He contributed a paper on the Antwerp Waterworks to the Institution of Civil Engineers (Minutes of Proceedings. lxxii. 24–83), for which he received a Telford Medal and premium.

About 1888 Anderson was asked by the explosives committee of the War Office to design the machinery for the manufacture of the new smokeless explosive, cordite. He had hardly commenced this task when, on 11 August 1889, he was appointed director-general of the ordnance factories. The duties of this post, mainly focused at the Royal Arsenal in Woolwich, prevented him from continuing his work in relation to the cordite machinery, which was committed to his eldest son. Anderson made many improvements in the details of the management of the Arsenal, and introduced greater economy into its administration.

During the 1890s, Anderson's continuing interest in education led to him becoming a trustee of the newly established Woolwich Polytechnic; he was a member of its governing body in 1893, and later (1895) represented the War Department on its board of governors. He was also involved with the Royal Arsenal Co-operative Society.

Anderson contributed numerous papers to scientific institutions, and delivered many lectures on scientific subjects. His Howard Lectures on the Conversion of Heat into Work, delivered before the Society of Arts in 1884 and 1885, were published in 1887 in the Specialist's Series. A second edition appeared in 1889.

== Honours ==
He was elected a member of the Institution of Civil Engineers on 12 January 1869. In 1886, he was elected a member of council, and in 1896 a vice-president. He was also a member of the Institution of Mechanical Engineers, of which he was president in 1892 and 1893. In 1889 he was president of section G at the meeting of the British Association at Newcastle, and on that occasion he received the honorary degree of D.C.L. from Durham University. On 4 June 1891 he was elected a fellow of the Royal Society. He was a vice-president of the Society of Arts, a member of the Royal Institution, of the Iron and Steel Institute, and of other societies. He was also a lieutenant-colonel of the engineer and railway volunteer staff corps. In 1895 he was created CB, and in 1897 K.C.B.

== Private life ==
He married Emma Eliza, daughter of J. R. Brown of Knighton, Radnorshire on 11 November 1856, and they had at least two sons and a daughter. He lived in Lesney House, in The Avenue, Erith. He died at Woolwich in 1898 and was buried in the churchyard of St John the Baptist, Erith, where a monument was erected in his memory. His coffin was carried by Woolwich Arsenal workers and placed on a special train to Erith where workers from the Erith Iron Works carried the coffin from the train to the hearse.

Professional and academic associations
Preceded by Joseph Tomlinson	President of the Institution of Mechanical Engineers; 1892–1893	Succeeded by Alexander Blackie William Kennedy
