= Joseph Lawrence (British politician) =

British politician

Sir Joseph Lawrence (23 September 1848 – 24 October 1919) was a Conservative Party politician in the United Kingdom.

He was elected as member of parliament (MP) for Monmouth Boroughs at a by-election in May 1901. The by-election was triggered by the unseating of the Conservative victor of the seat at the general election in October 1900, Dr Frederick Rutherfoord Harris, as a result of an election petition alleging irregularities in election spending.

The Conservative majority at the by-election was half that of the previous year, and Lawrence did not stand for re-election in 1906, when the seat was won by the Liberal Party candidate.

Lawrence was knighted in the 1902 Coronation Honours list, receiving the accolade from King Edward VII at Buckingham Palace on 24 October that year.

Parliament of the United Kingdom
Preceded by Frederick Rutherfoord Harris	Member of Parliament for Monmouth Boroughs; 1901 – 1906	Succeeded by Lewis Haslam
