= Henry Somerset, 1st Duke of Beaufort =

Welsh politician

His Grace The Duke of Beaufort KG PC
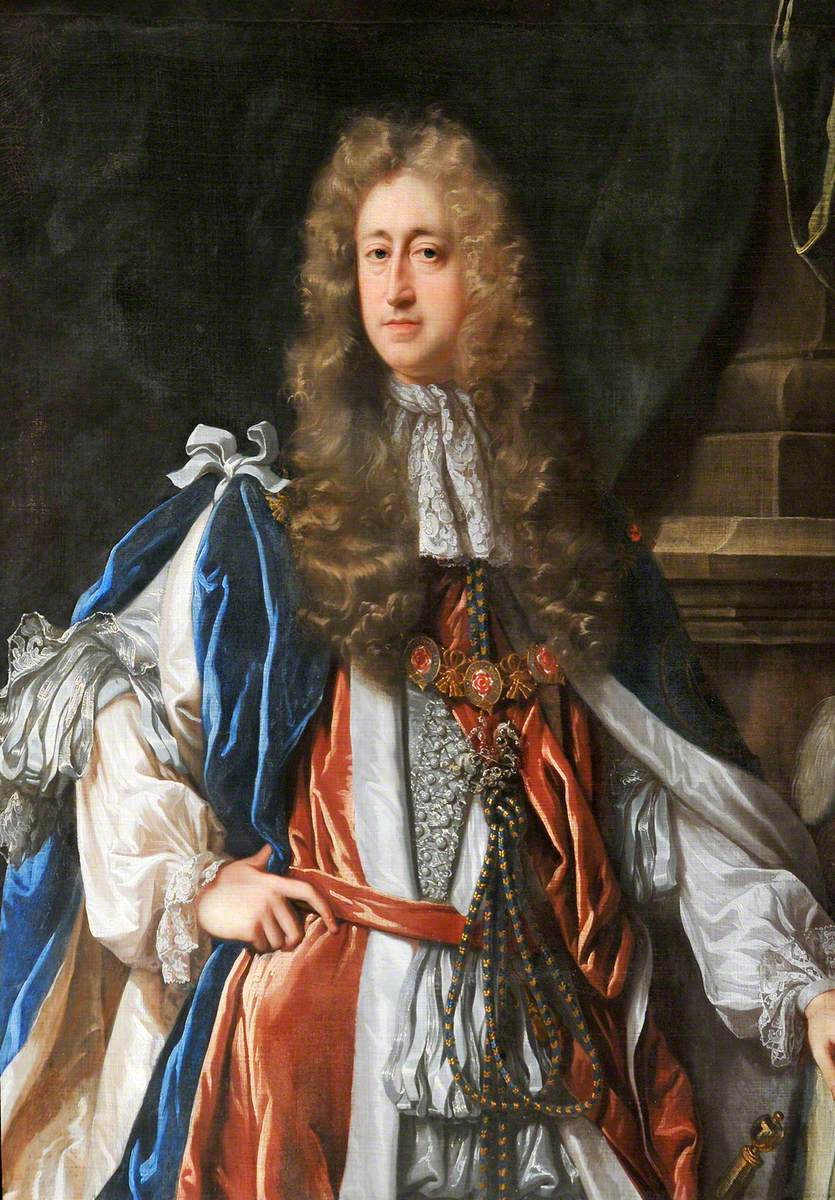
- Portrait by John Riley
- Born: 1629
- Died: 21 January 1700 (aged 70–71)
- Noble family: House of Somerset
- Spouse: Mary Capell
- Issue: 9, including Charles, Mary, Henrietta, and Anne
- Father: Edward Somerset, 2nd Marquess of Worcester
- Mother: Elizabeth Dormer

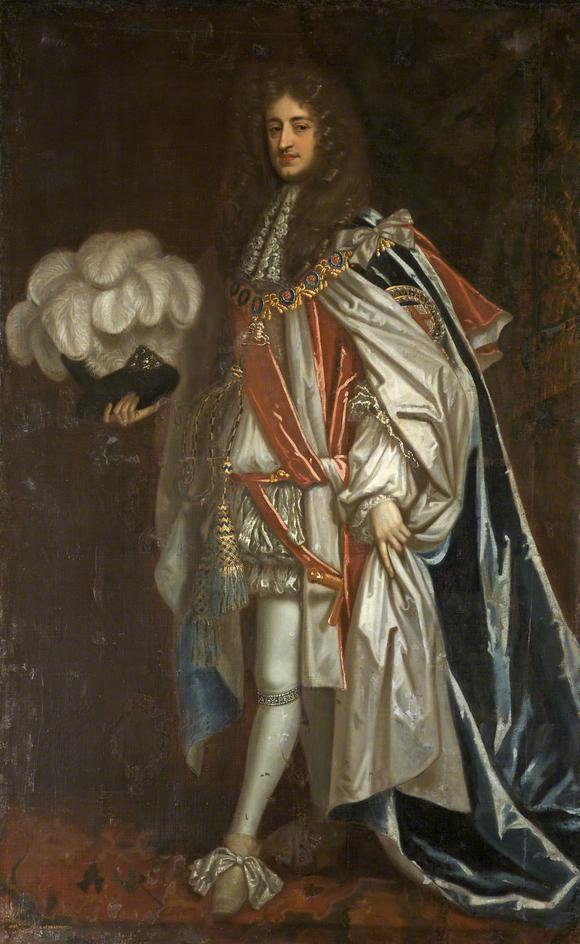
A portrait of Somerset in Garter robes from the collection of the Gloucester City Museum & Art Gallery.

Henry Somerset, 1st Duke of Beaufort (1629 – 21 January 1700) was an English politician who sat in the House of Commons at various times between 1654 and 1667, when he succeeded his father as 3rd Marquess of Worcester. He was styled Lord Herbert from 1644 until 3 April 1667. The Dukedom of Beaufort was bestowed upon him by King Charles II in 1682.

== Early life ==
Henry Somerset was born at Raglan Castle in 1629, and from 1644 was styled Lord Herbert of Raglan. (Note: Edward Somerset, 2nd Marquess of Worcester was styled Lord Herbert of Raglan from 1628–1644) As a reward for the services of his father Edward, he was promised, on 1 April 1646, the hand of Princess Elizabeth, the youngest daughter of King Charles I. He left the country during the First English Civil War, but returned by 1650.

== Lord Herbert ==
His father's estates had been forfeited, and those in Monmouthshire were held by Oliver Cromwell, but Herbert was given an allowance. Having renounced the Roman Catholic faith, which his father had held, he became acceptable to Cromwell, and was known as plain Mr. Herbert. He adopted the "republican" form of marriage before a justice of the peace in 1657. He sat in the First Protectorate Parliament as Member of Parliament for Breconshire in 1654–5.

After Cromwell's death, Herbert then joined the party that demanded a "full and free parliament", in practical terms demanding the Restoration of the House of Stuart. He was involved in the royalist plot of July 1659, and was committed to the Tower of London, whence he wrote to his wife on 20 August 1659 a letter taking a justly sanguine view of his situation. He was released on 1 November 1659, and was elected MP for Monmouthshire and for Wootton Basset in 1660; he chose to sit for Monmouthshire in the Convention Parliament. In 1661 he was re-elected MP for Monmouthshire in the Cavalier Parliament and sat until 1667 when he inherited a peerage.

As one of the twelve commissioners from the House of Commons who attended Charles II at Breda (7 May 1660), after Charles's accession Herbert was appointed warden of the Forest of Dean (18 June), and also on 30 July, in response to appeals from local gentry, lord lieutenant of Gloucestershire, Herefordshire, and Monmouthshire. The Monmouthshire estates, which he had obtained by reversion from Cromwell, were allowed to remain in his possession, though they should strictly have reverted to his father; the latter wrote to Lord Clarendon that his son was intriguing against him.

Lord Herbert kept aloof from court life, but maintained good relations with the Hydes. In 1662 he was occupied with the demolition of the walls and fortifications at Gloucester, but the next year he pleaded for the retention of a garrison at Chepstow. In 1663 he entertained the king and queen at Badminton, Gloucestershire, an estate which he acquired by devise. (Note: From his half-cousin Elizabeth, daughter and heiress of Thomas Somerset, 1st Viscount Somerset of Cashel. The latter, a younger son of Edward Somerset, 4th Earl of Worcester, had died without male issue in 1650 (Seccombe 1898, p. 243).) Herbert was created M.A. by Oxford University on 28 September in that year. He represented Monmouthshire in the House of Commons from 1660 to 1667, when on 3 April he succeeded his father as 3rd Marquess of Worcester.

== Marquess of Worcester ==
Worcester was created Lord President of the Council of Wales and the Marches in April 1672, a Privy Councillor on 17 April in the same year, and was installed as a Knight of the Garter on 29 May 1672. During the Popish Plot he was forced to maintain a public attitude of complete credence in the Plot, although he was aware that at least one of the informers, William Bedloe, was in league with his enemies, notably John Arnold, to damage his career. Bedloe never dared to accuse Worcester himself; he did accuse his steward Charles Price, and some of his relatives, but his accusations were so feeble that the Government ignored them. Worcester was also troubled by the accusations of treason made against his brother-in-law William Herbert, 1st Marquis of Powis, and against Donough Kearney, an Irishman who had married his widowed stepmother, Lady Margaret O'Brien. In the event, Kearney was acquitted of treason and Lord Powis was released after five years in the Tower of London without being brought to trial.

A steady supporter of the Court party, he voted against the Exclusion Bill at the close of 1680, whereupon the Commons petitioned the king to remove him from his person and counsels (January 1681). Charles regarded his conduct in a different light.

== Duke of Beaufort ==
By letters patent, dated 2 December 1682, the Marquess was advanced to the title of Duke of Beaufort, with reference to John Beaufort of three centuries earlier, of whom the newly created Duke was a direct male-line descendant. At about the same time, the Duke began the remodelling of his seat at Badminton. On the strength of his attitude to the Exclusion Bill, Beaufort figured prominently in John Dryden's Absalom and Achitophel as Bezaliel.

In November 1683 Beaufort obtained £20,000 damages in two libel actions against Sir Trevor Williams and John Arnold, but the judgment against the latter was partially reversed in 1690. In July 1684 he made, as president of the principality, magnificent progress through Wales, and was sumptuously entertained, among other places, at Worcester, Ludlow, and Welshpool. On 14 February 1685, along with the Duke of Somerset, he supported the Prince of Denmark as chief mourner at the funeral of Charles II. He bore the queen's crown at the coronation of James II (23 April 1685), was appointed a gentleman of the bedchamber on 16 May, and colonel of the 11th Regiment of Foot on 20 June following.

When the Duke of Monmouth, at the close of June 1685, was hesitating to march upon Bristol, Beaufort as Lord Lieutenant occupied it in force on 16 June. He threatened to fire the city if any of Monmouth's friends were admitted, and locked up a number of dissenters and disaffected persons in the Guildhall. Four days later he reviewed nineteen companies of foot and four troops of horse, and on 24 June twenty-one companies were drawn up on Redclyffe Mead and volunteers enlisted by the beat of the drum. On 6 July came tidings of Monmouth's defeat at the Battle of Sedgemoor.

On 24 September James II visited the Duke at Badminton, and expressed his satisfaction at his consistent loyalty. In October 1688, when the Glorious Revolution was proceeding, Beaufort once more occupied Bristol with the train-bands of Gloucestershire, and some of his men captured John Lovelace, 3rd Baron Lovelace (who was trying to join William of Orange) at Cirencester, and lodged him a prisoner in Gloucester Castle. He prepared to defend the city, but had eventually to surrender to the superior force under the Earl of Shrewsbury and Sir John Guise. He voted for a regency in preference to the offer of the crown to William of Orange.

On 14 December 1688 Beaufort waited on William at Windsor, but was coldly received. He nevertheless took the oaths in March 1689, and was so far reconciled as to entertain William at Badminton on 7 September 1690. In 1694 he was living in great seclusion at Chelsea, taking the waters, and absenting himself from court. Suspected of complicity in the assassination plot, his house was searched in February 1696, but nothing was found to compromise him.

== Last years ==
On 19 March 1696, when expected to attend the House of Lords to sign the Association, Beaufort "broke his shoulder". The Lords sent him the document to sign; but he refused, though he declared his abhorrence of the plot against William. By November 1697 he was reconciled to the court, but he suffered the loss of his son and heir, Charles, through an accident to his coach in Wales in July 1698.

Beaufort died at Badminton on 21 January 1700. He was buried in the Beaufort Chapel in St. George's, Windsor, where an elaborate monument was set up to his memory; (Note: For inscription see Ashmole's Berkshire, iii. 163 (Seccombe 1898, p. 245)) it was moved in 1878 to Badminton. Within St Michael and All Angels Church, Badminton, this monument by Grinling Gibbons is now on the North side of the chancel and consists of an effigy of the Duke in Garter robes, reclining on a sarcophagus and a plinth with relief of St George and the Dragon. There are twin Corinthian columns with embossed shafts, acanthus frieze, cornice with flaming urns, and the Duke's arms and supporters. At the top, 25 ft from the ground, is a tasselled cushion supporting a coronet; on the plinth are full-length female figures of Justice and Truth. Above the Duke's effigy, parted curtains show the heavenly host with palms and crowns. The Latin inscription displays the names of his family and the many offices he held.

Roger North, in his Life of the Lord Keeper, gave an account of the state maintained by Beaufort: "a princely way of living" with a household of about 200. The Duke spent much time hunting, planting, and building, and was unfashionably strict: his servants lived in constant fear of dismissal, and even neighbouring landowners were reluctant to cross him.

== Family ==
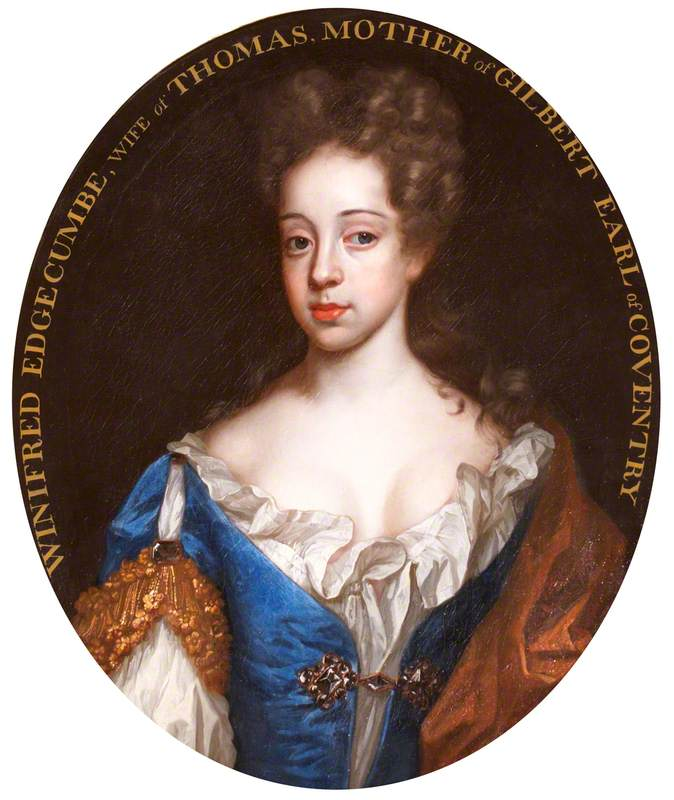
Henry Somerset had four daughters, including Anne (pictured). The inscription on this painting is false.

On 17 August 1657, he married Mary Capell, who was the daughter of Arthur Capell, 1st Baron Capell of Hadham, sister of Arthur Capell, 1st Earl of Essex, and widow of Henry Seymour, Lord Beauchamp. They had five sons and four daughters. Three of the sons were:

- Henry, who died as an infant;
- Charles (December 1660 – 13 July 1698), who had a military and political career and succeeded him as Marquess of Worcester;
- Arthur (29 September 1671 – July 1743), who married Mary Russell in 1695, daughter of William Russell, 1st and last Bt., and Hesther Rouse, daughter of Sir Thomas Rouse, 1st Bt. (1608–1676). Their daughter was Mary Somerset, grandmother of Sir Charles William Rouse Boughton, 1st and 9th Bt.

Three of the daughters were:

- Mary, Lady of the Bedchamber, who was married to James Butler, 2nd Duke of Ormonde as his second wife, and became the mother of one son and two daughters;
- Henrietta, who was married twice, first to Henry Horatio O'Brien, Lord Ibrackan, with whom she had one son, the 8th Earl of Thomond, and three daughters, and secondly to Henry Howard, 6th Earl of Suffolk as his second wife
- Anne (1673–1763), who married Thomas Coventry, 2nd Earl of Coventry, and became the mother of one son.

The fourth daughter—bearing an unknown name—might have died young.

Beaufort's son Charles died before he could inherit the dukedom, so on the duke's death it passed to Charles's son Henry.

== Family tree ==
Peerage family tree of the Dukes of Beaufort, Lancaster, and Somerset and subsidiary titles

Earl of Dorset (possibly 1st creation), 1070
Roger de Beaumont c. 1015–1094	Saint Osmund d. 1099; Bishop of Salisbury and possibly Earl of Dorset
Earl of Dorset (1st creation) discontinued, 1099
Earl of Leicester (1st creation), 1107
King Henry I c. 1068–1135	King Stephen; 1092/1096–1154	Robert de Beaumont c. 1040/1050–1118; 1st Earl of Leicester	Henry de Beaumont d. 1119; Earl of Warwick
Earl of Worcester (1st creation), 1138
Robert FitzRoy c. 1090–1147; Earl of Gloucester	Matilda (d. bef. 1141)	Waleran de Beaumont; 1104–1166; Earl of Worcester	Robert de Beaumont; 1104–1168; 2nd Earl of Leicester	Hugh de Beaumont b. 1106; Earl of Bedford
Earldom of Worcester (1st creation) extinct, 1166
William FitzRobert; 1116–1183; Earl of Gloucester	Hawise de Beaumont	Robert de Beaumont d. 1190; 3rd Earl of Leicester
Robert de Beaumont d. 1204; 4th Earl of Leicester	Amice; Countess of Rochefort
King John; 1166–1216	Isabella; 1173/1174–1217; Countess of Gloucester	Simon de Montfort c. 1175–1218; 5th Earl of Leicester
King Henry III; 1207–1272	Eleanor of England	Simon de Montfort c. 1208–1265; 6th Earl of Leicester
Earldom of Leicester (1st creation) forfeited, 1265
Earl of Leicester (2nd creation), 1267; Earl of Lancaster, 1276
King Edward I 1239–1307	Edmund Crouchback; 1245–1296; 1st Earl of Leicester, 1st Earl of Lancaster
Earldom of Leicester (2nd creation) restored, 1324; Earldom of Lancaster restored, 1327
King Edward II; 1284–1327	Thomas of Lancaster; 1278–1322; 2nd Earl of Leicester, 2nd Earl of Lancaster	Henry of Lancaster; 1281–1345; 3rd Earl of Leicester, 3rd Earl of Lancaster
Earldom of Leicester (2nd creation) and Earldom of Lancaster forfeited, 1322
Duke of Lancaster, 1351
King Edward III; 1312–1377	Henry of Grosmont c. 1310–1361; Duke of Lancaster, 4th Earl of Lancaster, 4th Earl of Leicester	Joan of Lancaster c. 1312–1349 m. John (II) de Mowbray; 1310–1361; Baron Mowbray	Eleanor of Lancaster; 1318–1372	Mary of Lancaster c. 1320–1362
Earl of Worcester (2nd creation), 1397
John of Gaunt; 1340–1399; Duke of Lancaster, 5th Earl of Lancaster, (6th) Earl of Leicester jure uxoris Earl of Richmond	Blanche of Lancaster; 1342–1368; 5th Countess of Lancaster, (6th) Countess of Leicester	Maud of Lancaster; 1340–1362 a.k.a. Matilda, Countess of Hainault	William; 1330–1389; Duke of Bavaria and Count of Holland, (5th) Earl of Leicester jure uxoris	Richard Fitzalan; 1346–1397; Earl of Arundel	Thomas Percy; 1343–1403; Earl of Worcester
Earldom of Worcester (2nd creation) extinct, 1403
Eleanor Mowbray d. bef. 1387 m. Roger La Warr; 1326–1370
Earl of Somerset (1st creation), 1397; Marquess of Somerset and Marquess of Dorset (1st creation), 1397	Earl of Dorset (2nd creation), 1411
Henry Bolingbroke; 1367–1413; Duke of Lancaster, (7th) Earl of Leicester later King Henry IV	John Beaufort c. 1373–1410; Marquess of Somerset, Marquess of Dorset, 1st Earl of Somerset	Thomas Beaufort c. 1377–1426; Duke of Exeter, Earl of Dorset	Joan Beaufort c. 1379–1440	Joan La Warr m. Thomas West; 1365–1405; Baron West	Joan de Beauchamp; 1375–1435
Earldom of Leicester (2nd creation) and Dukedom of Lancaster merged into the Crown, 1399	Marquessate of Somerset and Marquessate of Dorset (1st creation) revoked, 1399	Earldom of Dorset (2nd creation) extinct, 1426
Duke of Lancaster, 1399	Earl of Worcester (3rd creation), 1421
Henry of Monmouth; 1386–1422; Duke of Lancaster later King Henry V	Richard Beauchamp (1394–c. 1422); Earl of Worcester	Reginald West; 1395–1450; Baron De La Warr and Baron West
Dukedom of Lancaster merged into the Crown, 1413	Earldom of Worcester (2nd creation) extinct, 1422
Duke of Somerset (1st creation), 1443	Earl of Dorset (3rd creation), 1442; Marquess of Dorset (2nd creation), 1443; Duke of Somerset (2nd creation), 1448
Henry Beaufort; 1401–1418; 2nd Earl of Somerset	John Beaufort; 1404–1444; 1st Duke of Somerset, 3rd Earl of Somerset	Edmund Beaufort; 1406–1455; 2nd Duke of Somerset, 1st Marquess of Dorset, etc., 4th Earl of Somerset	Richard Neville; 1400–1460; Earl of Salisbury	Edward Neville d. 1476; Baron Bergavenny	Elizabeth Beauchamp; 1415–1448	Richard West; 1430–1476; Baron De La Warr, Baron West
Dukedom of Somerset (1st creation) extinct, 1444
Claimed titles here are disputed	Earl of Worcester (4th creation), 1449
Margaret Beaufort; 1443–1509	Elizabeth Woodville c. 1437–1492	Henry Beaufort; 1436–1464; 3rd Duke of Somerset, 2nd Marquess of Dorset, 5th Earl of Dorset	Edmund Beaufort c. 1438–1471; 4th Duke of Somerset, 3rd Marquess of Dorset, 6th Earl of Dorset	Cecily Neville c. 1425–1450	John Tiptoft; 1427–1470; 1st Earl of Worcester
Dukedom of Somerset (2nd creation), Marquessate of Dorset (2nd creation), and Earldom of Dorset attained, 1461, but possibly restored (disputed), 1463	Dukedom of Somerset (2nd creation), Marquessate of Dorset (2nd creation), and Earldom of Dorset extinct, 1471	Earldom of Worcester (4th creation) attainted, 1470
Thomas West c. 1457–1525; Baron De La Warr, Baron West
Marquess of Dorset (3rd creation), 1475	Earl of Worcester (5th creation), 1514	Earl of Worcester (4th creation) restored, 1471
Margery Wentworth c. 1478–1550	King Henry VII; 1457–1509	Elizabeth of York; 1466–1503	Thomas Grey; 1451–1501; 1st Marquess of Dorset	Charles Somerset c. 1460–1526; 1st Earl of Worcester	Elizabeth Somerset c. 1476–1507; 3rd Baroness Herbert suo jure	Edward Tiptoft c. 1469–1485; 2nd Earl of Worcester	Eleanor West b. 1481 m. Edward Guildford c. 1474–1534
Earldom of Worcester (4th creation) extinct, 1485
Viscount Beauchamp "of Hache" (1st creation), 1536; Earl of Hertford (2nd creation), 1537; Duke of Somerset (4th creation), 1547	Duke of Somerset (3rd creation), 1499
Edward Seymour c. 1500–1552; Duke of Somerset, Earl of Hertford, etc.	Jane Seymour c. 1508–1537	King Henry VIII; 1491–1547	Thomas Grey; 1477–1530; 2nd Marquess of Dorset	Henry Somerset c. 1495–1548; 2nd Earl of Worcester, 4th Baron Herbert	Mary Tudor; 1496–1533; Queen of France; Duchess of Suffolk	Edmund Tudor; 1499–1500; 1st Duke of Somerset	Jane Guildford c. 1508/1509–1555 m. John Dudley; 1504–1553; Duke of Northumberland
Dukedom of Somerset (4th creation), Earldom of Hertford (2nd creation), and Viscountcy Beauchamp (1st creation) forfeit, 1552	Dukedom of Somerset (3rd creation) extinct, 1500
Duke of Richmond and Somerset, 1525
King Edward VI; 1537–1553	Henry Fitzroy; 1519–1536; 1st Duke of Richmond and Somerset	Henry Grey; 1517–1554; Duke of Suffolk, 3rd Marquess of Dorset	Frances Brandon; 1517–1559; Duchess of Suffolk
Dukedom of Richmond and Somerset extinct, 1536	Marquessate of Dorset (3rd creation) attainted and honours forfeit, 1554
Earl of Hertford (3rd creation) and Viscount Beauchamp "of Hache" (2nd creation), 1559	Earl of Leicester (3rd creation), 1564	Baron Buckhurst (1st creation), 1567; Earl of Dorset (4th creation), 1604
Edward Seymour c. 1528–1593	Edward Seymour; 1539–1621; Earl of Hertford, etc.	Katherine Grey; 1540–1568	William Somerset c. 1526–1589; 3rd Earl of Worcester, 5th Baron Herbert	John Dudley c. 1527–1554; Earl of Warwick	Robert Dudley; 1532–1588; 1st Earl of Leicester	Mary Dudley c. 1530–1586 m. Henry Sidney	Guildford Dudley c. 1535–1554	Jane Grey; 1537–1554; Disputed Queen of England	Thomas Sackville; 1536–1608; 1st Earl of Dorset, etc.
Earldom of Hertford (3rd creation) forfeit, 1552	Earldom of Leicester (3rd creation) extinct, 1588
Seymour baronets, of Berry Pomeroy, 1611	Earl of Leicester (4th creation), 1618
Edward Seymour c. 1563–1613; 1st Baronet	Edward Seymour; 1561–1612; Viscount Beauchamp	Edward Somerset; 1553–1628; 4th Earl of Worcester, 6th Baron Herbert	Philip Sidney; 1554–1586	Mary Sidney; 1561–1621	Robert Sidney; 1563–1626; 1st Earl of Leicester	Robert Sackville; 1561–1609; 2nd Earl of Dorset, etc.
Marquess of Hertford (1st creation), 1641; Duke of Somerset (4th creation restored), 1660	Baron Seymour of Trowbridge, 1641	Marquess of Worcester, 1642	Viscount Somerset of Cashel, 1626	Viscount Rochester, 1611; Earl of Somerset (3rd creation), 1613
Edward Seymour c. 1580–1659; 2nd Baronet	William Seymour; 1588–1660; 2nd Duke of Somerset, 1st Marquess of Hertford, 2nd Earl of Hertford	Francis Seymour c. 1590–1664; 1st Lord Seymour of Trowbridge	Henry Somerset; 1577–1646; 1st Marquess of Worcester, 5th Earl of Worcester, 7th Baron Herbert	Thomas Somerset; 1579–1651; Viscount Somerset	Robert Sidney; 1595–1677; 2nd Earl of Leicester	Richard Sackville; 1589–1624; 3rd Earl of Dorset, etc.	Edward Sackville; 1591–1652; 4th Earl of Dorset, etc.	Robert Carr c. 1587–1645; Earl of Somerset, etc.
Viscountcy Somerset extinct, 1651	Earldom of Somerset (3rd creation) and Viscountcy Rochester extinct, 1645
Edward Seymour; 1610–1688; 3rd Baronet	Henry Seymour c. 1626–1654; Lord Beauchamp	Charles Seymour c. 1621–1665; 2nd Lord Seymour of Trowbridge	Edward Somerset; 1601–1667; 2nd Marquess of Worcester, 6th Earl of Worcester, 8th Baron Herbert	Philip Sidney; 1619–1698; 3rd Earl of Leicester	Algernon Sidney; 1623–1683	Lucy Sidney; 1630–1685	Henry Sidney; 1641–1704; Earl of Romney	Richard Sackville; 1522–1677; 5th Earl of Dorset, etc.
Duke of Beaufort, 1682	Baron Cranfield, 1674; Earl of Middlesex (2nd creation), 1675
Edward Seymour; 1633–1708; 4th Baronet	William Seymour; 1650–1671; 3rd Duke of Somerset, 2nd Marquess of Hertford, 3rd Earl of Hertford	John Seymour c. 1646–1675; 4th Duke of Somerset, 3rd Marquess of Hertford, 4th Earl of Hertford	Francis Seymour; 1658–1678; 5th Duke of Somerset, 3rd Lord Seymour of Trowbridge	Charles Seymour; 1662–1748; 6th Duke of Somerset	Henry Somerset; 1629–1700; 1st Duke of Beaufort, 3rd Marquess of Worcester, 7th Earl of Worcester, 9th Baron Herbert	Robert Sidney; 1649–1702; 4th Earl of Leicester	Thomas Pelham; 1653–1712	Charles Sackville; 1522–1677; 6th Earl of Dorset, etc., 1st Earl of Middlesex, etc.
Marquessate of Hertford (1st creation) extinct, 1675
Baron Conway of Ragley, 1703; Baron Conway of Killultagh, 1712	Duke of Dorset, 1720
Edward Seymour; 1663–1740; 5th Baronet	Francis Seymour-Conway; 1679–1732; 1st Baron Conway	Edward Coke d. 1707	Algernon Seymour; 1684–1750; 7th Duke of Somerset, Earl of Northumberland	Charles Somerset; 1660–1698 styled Marquess of Worcester	Philip Sidney; 1676–1705; 5th Earl of Leicester	John Sidney; 1680–1737; 6th Earl of Leicester	Jocelyn Sidney; 1682–1743; 7th Earl of Leicester	Elizabeth Pelham; 1681–1711	Lionel Sackville; 1688–1765; 1st Duke of Dorset, 7th Earl of Dorset, etc., 2nd Earl of Middlesex, etc.
Earldom of Leicester (4th creation) extinct, 1743
Baron Lovel, of Minster Lovel, 1728; Earl of Leicester (5th creation) and Viscount Coke, 1744
Edward Seymour; 1695–1757; 8th Duke of Somerset; 6th Baronet	Anne Coke	Thomas Coke; 1697–1759; Earl of Leicester, etc.	Henry Somerset; 1684–1714; 2nd Duke of Beaufort, 4th Marquess of Worcester, 8th Earl of Worcester, 10th Baron Herbert	Charles Townshend; 1700–1764; Viscount Townshend
Earl of Hertford (4th creation) and Viscount Beauchamp (2nd creation), 1850; Marquess of Hertford (2nd creation) and Earl of Yarmouth (3rd creation), 1793	Earldom of Leicester (5th creation) and subsidiary titles extinct, 1759	Viscount Sackville and Baron Bolebrooke, 1782
Edward Seymour; 1717–1792; 9th Duke of Somerset	Webb Seymour; 1718–1793; 10th Duke of Somerset	Francis Seymour; 1726–1799	Francis Seymour-Conway; 1718–1794; 1st Marquess of Hertford, etc., 2nd Baron Conway	Wenman (Roberts) Coke c. 1717–1776	Henry Somerset-Scudamore; 1707–1745; 3rd Duke of Beaufort, 5th Marquess of Worcester, 9th Earl of Worcester, 11th Baron Herbert	Charles Noel Somerset; 1709–1756; 4th Duke of Beaufort, 6th Marquess of Worcester, 10th Earl of Worcester, 12th Baron Herbert	George Townshend; 1724–1807; Marquess Townshend	Charles Sackville; 1711–1769; 2nd Duke of Dorset, 8th Earl of Dorset, etc., 3rd Earl of Middlesex, etc.	John Sackville; 1713–1765	George Germain; 1716–1785; 1st Viscount Sackville, etc.
Earl of Leicester (7th creation) and Viscount Coke (2nd creation), 1837	Baron Botetourt abeyance terminated, 1803	Earl of Leicester (6th creation), 1784
Francis Compton Seymour d. 1822	Francis Ingram-Seymour-Conway; 1743–1822; 2nd Marquess of Hertford, etc., 3rd Baron Conway	Hugh Seymour; 1759–1801	Thomas William Coke; 1754–1842; 1st Earl of Leicester, etc.	Henry Somerset; 1744–1803; 5th Duke of Beaufort, 7th Marquess of Worcester, 11th Earl of Worcester, 13th Baron Herbert, 5th Baron Botetourt	George Townshend; 1753–1811; 2nd Marquess Townshend, 1st Earl of Leicester	John Frederick Sackville; 1745–1799; 3rd Duke of Dorset, 9th Earl of Dorset, etc., 4th Earl of Middlesex, etc.
Baron Raglan, 1852
Edward Adolphus St Maur; 1775–1855; 11th Duke of Somerset	Francis Charles Seymour-Conway; 1777–1842; 3rd Marquess of Hertford, etc., 4th Baron Conway	George Seymour; 1787–1870	Henry Charles Somerset; 1766–1835; 6th Duke of Beaufort, 8th Marquess of Worcester, 12th Earl of Worcester, 14th Baron Herbert, 6th Baron Botetourt	FitzRoy James Henry Somerset; 1788–1855; 1st Baron Raglan	George Townshend; 1778–1855; 3rd Marquess Townshend, 2nd Earl of Leicester	George John Frederick Sackville; 1793–1815; 4th Duke of Dorset, 10th Earl of Dorset, etc., 5th Earl of Middlesex, etc.	John Frederick Sackville; 1767–1843; 5th Duke of Dorset, 11th Earl of Dorset, 6th Earl of Middlesex, etc., 2nd Viscount Sackville, etc.
Earldom of Leicester (6th creation) extinct, 1855	Dukedom of Dorset, Earldoms of Dorset (4th creation) and Middlesex (2nd creation), Viscountcy of Sackville, Baronies of Buckhurst (1st creation), Cranfield, and Bolebrooke extinct, 1843
Francis Edward Seymour; 1788–1866	Richard Seymour-Conway; 1800–1870; 4th Marquess of Hertford, etc., 5th Baron Conway	Francis George Hugh Seymour; 1812–1884; 5th Marquess of Hertford, etc., 6th Baron Conway	Henry Somerset; 1792–1853; 7th Duke of Beaufort, 9th Marquess of Worcester, 13th Earl of Worcester, 15th Baron Herbert, 7th Baron Botetourt
Earl St. Maur, 1863
Edward Adolphus St Maur; 1804–1885; 12th Duke of Somerset	Archibald Henry Algernon St Maur; 1810–1891; 13th Duke of Somerset	Algernon Percy Banks St Maur; 1813–1894; 14th Duke of Somerset	Francis Payne Seymour; 1815–1870	Thomas William Coke; 1822–1909; 2nd Earl of Leicester, etc.	Henry Charles FitzRoy Somerset; 1824–1899; 8th Duke of Beaufort, 10th Marquess of Worcester, 14th Earl of Worcester, 16th Baron Herbert, 8th Baron Botetourt	Richard Henry FitzRoy Somerset; 1817–1884; 2nd Baron Raglan
Earldom St. Maur extinct, 1885
Edward Adolphus Ferdinand St. Maur; 1835–1869	Algernon St Maur; 1846–1923; 15th Duke of Somerset	Edward Hamilton Seymour; 1860–1931; 16th Duke of Somerset	Hugh de Grey Seymour; 1843–1912; 6th Marquess of Hertford, etc., 7th Baron Conway	Thomas William Coke; 1848–1941; 3rd Earl of Leicester, etc.	Henry Adelbert Wellington FitzRoy Somerset; 1847–1924; 9th Duke of Beaufort, 11th Marquess of Worcester, 15th Earl of Worcester, 17th Baron Herbert, 9th Baron Botetourt	Henry Richard Charles Somerset; 1849–1932	George FitzRoy Henry Somerset; 1857–1921; 3rd Baron Raglan
Evelyn Francis Edward Seymour; 1882–1954; 17th Duke of Somerset	George Francis Alexander Seymour; 1871–1940; 7th Marquess of Hertford, etc., 8th Baron Conway	Henry Charles Seymour; 1878–1939	Thomas William Coke; 1880–1949; 4th Earl of Leicester, etc.	Arthur George Coke; 1882–1915	Henry Charles Somers Augustus Somerset; 1874–1945	FitzRoy Richard Somerset; 1885–1964; 4th Baron Raglan
Percy Hamilton Seymour; 1910–1984; 18th Duke of Somerset	Thomas William Edward Coke; 1908–1976; 5th Earl of Leicester, etc.	Anthony Louis Lovel Coke; 1909–1994; 6th Earl of Leicester, etc.	Henry Hugh Arthur FitzRoy Somerset; 1900–1984; 10th Duke of Beaufort, 12th Marquess of Worcester, 16th Earl of Worcester, 18th Baron Herbert, 10th Baron Botetourt	Henry Robert Somers FitzRoy de Vere Somerset; 1898–1965
Barony Botetourt abeyant, 1984
Hugh Edward Conway Seymour; 1930–1997; 8th Marquess of Hertford, etc., 9th Baron Conway	Edward Douglas Coke; 1936–2015; 7th Earl of Leicester, etc.	David Robert Somerset; 1928–2017; 11th Duke of Beaufort, 13th Marquess of Worcester, 17th Earl of Worcester	FitzRoy John Somerset; 1927–2010; 5th Baron Raglan	Geoffrey Somerset; 1932–2025; 6th Baron Raglan
John Michael Edward Seymour b. 1952; 19th Duke of Somerset	Henry (Harry) Jocelyn Seymour b. 1958; 9th Marquess of Hertford, etc., 10th Baron Conway	Thomas Edward Coke b. 1965; 8th Earl of Leicester, etc.	Henry John FitzRoy Somerset b. 1952; 12th Duke of Beaufort, 14th Marquess of Worcester, 18th Earl of Worcester	Arthur Geoffrey Somerset; 1960–2012
Sebastian Edward Seymour b. 1982 styled Lord Seymour	William Francis Seymour b. 1993 styled Earl of Yarmouth	Edward Horatio Coke b. 2003 styled Viscount Coke	Henry Robert FitzRoy Somerset b. 1989 styled Marquess of Worcester	Inigo Arthur Fitzroy Somerset; 7th Baron Raglan b. 2004	Ivo Geoffrey Arthur Tarsus Somerset b. 2007
Heir apparent to the Dukedom of Somerset	Heir apparent to the Marquessate of Hertford	Heir apparent to the Earldom of Leicester	Heir apparent to the Dukedom of Beaufort	Heir presumptive to the Raglan Barony

=== Ancestry ===
Ancestors of Henry Somerset, 1st Duke of Beaufort

8. Edward Somerset, 4th Earl of Worcester
4. Henry Somerset, 1st Marquess of Worcester
9. Elizabeth Hastings
2. Edward Somerset, 2nd Marquess of Worcester
10. John Russell, Baron Russell
5. Anne Russell
11. Elizabeth Cooke
1. Henry Somerset, 1st Duke of Beaufort
12. Robert Dormer, 1st Baron Dormer
6. Sir William Dormer
13. Elizabeth Browne
3. Elizabeth Dormer
14. Sir Richard Molyneux, 1st Baronet
7. Alice Molyneux
15. Frances Gerard

== Notes ==
Parliament of England
Unknown	Member of Parliament for Wootton Basset; 1660; With: John Pleydell	Succeeded by John Pleydell; Sir Baynham Throckmorton
Preceded by John Nicholas; William Morgan	Member of Parliament for Monmouthshire; 1660–1667; With: William Morgan	Succeeded by William Morgan; Sir Trevor Williams, Bt
Military offices
New regiment	Colonel of the Duke of Beaufort's Regiment of Foot; 1685	Succeeded by Marquess of Worcester
Honorary titles
English Interregnum	Lord Lieutenant of Gloucestershire, Herefordshire and Monmouthshire; 1660–1689	Succeeded by The Earl of Macclesfield
English Interregnum	Custos Rotulorum of Monmouthshire; 1660–1689	Succeeded by The Earl of Macclesfield
Preceded by The Viscount Scudamore	Custos Rotulorum of Herefordshire; 1671–1689	Succeeded by The Earl of Macclesfield
Preceded by The Earl of Carbery	Lord President of Wales; Lord Lieutenant of Wales; 1672–1689	Succeeded by The Earl of Macclesfield
Preceded by The Viscount Fitzhardinge	Custos Rotulorum of Somerset; 1668–1672	Succeeded by The Duke of Somerset
Preceded by Sir Thomas Williams, Bt	Custos Rotulorum of Brecknockshire; 1679–1689	Succeeded by Sir Rowland Gwynne
Peerage of England
New title	Duke of Beaufort; 1682–1700	Succeeded by Henry Somerset
Preceded by Edward Somerset	Marquess of Worcester; 1667–1700	Succeeded by Henry Somerset
