= Philip Jones (MP) =

16th-century Welsh politician

Philip Jones (died 1603), of London and Llanarth, Monmouthshire, was a Welsh politician.

He was a member (MP) of the parliament of England for Monmouth Boroughs in 1589.
