= Moore Gwillim =

Welsh politician (died 1611)

Moore Gwillim (died 1611), of Monmouth and Rockfield, Monmouthshire, was a Welsh politician.

He was a member (MP) of the parliament of England for Monmouth Boroughs in 1584 and 1586.
