= Nathaniel Waterhouse =

- Occupation: Member of Parliament

Nathaniel Waterhouse was an English politician who sat in the House of Commons in 1656 and 1659.

== Biography ==
Waterhouse was of the family of Waterhouse of Halifax and was a resident of Westminster. He was steward of the lands of Oliver Cromwell from 1651 to 1658. In 1656, he was elected Member of Parliament for Monmouthshire for the Second Protectorate Parliament as a replacement for a member who chose another seat. In 1659 he was servant to Richard Cromwell. He was elected MP for Monmouth Boroughs for the Third Protectorate Parliament in 1659.

Parliament of England
Preceded by Major General James Berry; Edward Herbert; John Nicholas	Member of Parliament for Monmouthshire; 1656; With: John Nicholas; Edward Herbert	Succeeded by John Nicholas; William Morgan
Preceded by Not represented in Second Protectorate Parliament	Member of Parliament for Monmouth Boroughs; 1659	Succeeded by Thomas Pury
