= Henry Herbert (Parliamentarian) =

Welsh politician

Henry Herbert (born 1617) was a Welsh politician who sat in the House of Commons of England between 1642 and 1654. He fought in the Parliamentary army in the English Civil War.

Herbert was the son of William Herbert of Coldbrook. He matriculated at Magdalen Hall, Oxford on 10 October 1634 and entered Middle Temple in the same year.

In March 1642, Herbert was elected Member of Parliament for Monmouthshire in the Long Parliament. He was a colonel in the Parliamentary army and took Cardiff in September 1645 and then Swansea. He was one of the parliamentary commissioners for Monmouthshire in 1646 and took a prominent role in the Commonwealth. He was appointed a member of High Court of Justice on 25 June 1651. He was a member of 4th Council of State from 19 November 1651 to November 1652 and was placed on the committee of law and the committee for preserving of timber on 2 December 1651. He was appointed Commissioner of Militia for Monmouthshire on 14 March 1654. In 1654 he was re-elected MP for Monmouthshire in the First Protectorate Parliament. He was given £3000 and the plunder of Raglan Castle. His brother Major William Herbert was a commissioner of array for the King.

Herbert married Mary Rudyard, daughter of John Rudyard, grocer of London. After his death she married William Herbert of Cogan as his second wife.

Parliament of England
| Preceded by Sir Charles Williams; William Herbert | Member of Parliament for Monmouthshire; 1642–1653; With: William Herbert | Succeeded by Philip Jones |
| Preceded by Philip Jones | Member of Parliament for Monmouthshire; 1654; With: Richard Cromwell; Philip Jones; Thomas Morgan; Thomas Hughes | Succeeded by Major General James Berry; John Nicholas; Edward Herbert |
