= Llanvihangel Court =

Tudor country house in Monmouthshire, Wales

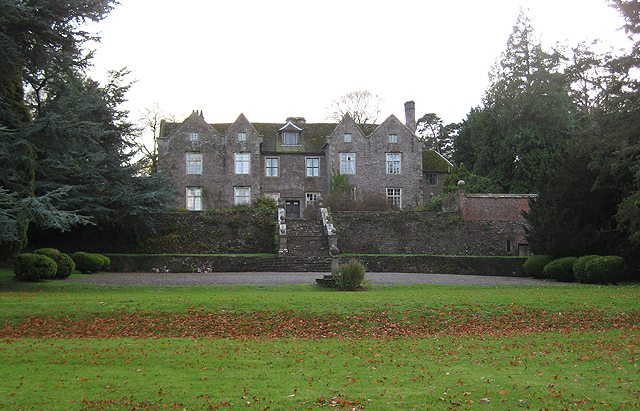
- "The most impressive country house of around 1600 in Monmouthshire"

- Location within Monmouthshire
- 51.8782°N 2.9779°W
- Type: House
- Location: Llanvihangel Crucorney, Monmouthshire

History
- Built: circa 1600

Site notes
- Architectural style: Tudor
- Governing body: Privately owned

Listed Building – Grade I
- Official name: Llanvihangel Court
- Designated: 6 May 1952
- Reference no.: 1919

Listed Building – Grade I
- Official name: Stable Block at Llanvihangel Court
- Designated: 29 January 1998
- Reference no.: 19288

Listed Building – Grade II*
- Official name: Garden House at Llanvihangel Court
- Designated: 9 January 1956
- Reference no.: 1945

Cadw/ICOMOS Register of Parks and Gardens of Special Historic Interest in Wales
- Official name: Llanvihangel Court
- Designated: 1 February 2022
- Reference no.: PGW(Gt)14(Mon)
- Listing: Grade I

Llanvihangel (or Llanfihangel) Court, Llanvihangel Crucorney, is a Tudor country house in Monmouthshire, Wales. The architectural historian John Newman, in his Gwent/Monmouthshire volume of The Buildings of Wales series described the court as "the most impressive and richly decorated house of around 1600 in Monmouthshire". The origins of the house are medieval, with a traditional date of construction of 1471. The building was given its present appearance by a substantial enlargement and re-casing of circa 1600 by Rhys Morgan, of the family of the original owners. In the very early 17th century it was owned briefly by Edward Somerset, 4th Earl of Worcester.

In 1627 it was purchased by Nicholas Arnold and was further extended by him and by his heir John. Nicholas Arnold was a noted horse-breeder as well as Member of Parliament for Monmouthshire and was responsible for the construction of the Stable Block at Llanvihangel. His son was a notorious anti-Papist and Llanvihangel became a centre of the campaign against Monmouthshire recusants.

The court had a number of owners in the 18th, 19th and 20th centuries, including the Earls of Oxford and Earls Mortimer. It remains a private house that is occasionally opened to the public and is a Grade I listed building. The stable block has its own Grade I listing, and the garden house, originally one of two on the site of a former walled garden, is listed Grade II*. The gardens at Llanvihangel are listed at Grade I on the Cadw/ICOMOS Register of Parks and Gardens of Special Historic Interest in Wales.

== History ==
The traditional construction date of the court is 1471 but little remains of this original building. In the mid-16th century the Morgan family began a substantial rebuilding which incorporated certain of the earlier medieval elements. A further rebuilding took place at the end of the 16th or the start of the 17th centuries, when the house was again extended to form a substantial building on an H-plan. It is not certain which elements of this reconstruction were undertaken by the Morgans, or by the Arnolds, who purchased the court in 1627.

Nicholas Arnold was member of parliament for Monmouthshire, and Sheriff for the county in 1633. He was also a significant breeder of horses and undertook the construction of the stable block at Llanfihangel soon after his purchase of the estate. Nicholas was succeeded by his son John, also an MP and a staunch Protestant. His religious views and marked intolerance of Catholics, in a county with a strong recusant tradition, made him a controversial figure. Arnold led the persecution of Catholics within Monmouthshire and was responsible for the hunting, trial and execution of a number of Catholic priests. An example was the Jesuit Father David Lewis who was caught by Arnold at St Michael's Church, Llantarnam, held at Llanvihangel, and subsequently executed at Usk in 1679.

Following the death of Arnold's son, without issue, his daughters sold the estate to Edward Harley in 1722. His great-nephew, the 5th Earl of Oxford sold Llanvihangel Court in 1801 to Hugh Powell, treasurer of St. Bartholomew's Hospital. It then descended to the Honourable William Powell Rodney who lived at the court until his death in 1878. His grandson sold the house in 1903 to Mr. Atwood Matthews whose widow lived there until 1924. It was then bought by Edward Osborne Bennett, who was High Sheriff of Monmouthshire in 1936. On his death in 1945 the house was purchased by Colonel and Mrs H S P Hopkinson, a direct descendant of the Edward Somerset who owned it in 1608. His family continue to own the court and it is occasionally opened to the public.

== Architecture and description ==
The house has a "complicated building history". The construction is largely of Old Red Sandstone rubble. The north front is of two storeys and six bays, and is from the Morgan extension of 1599, and later made more symmetrical by Nicholas and John Arnold in the mid and late 17th century. Further work continued as late as the 20th century; Mrs Matthews adding two huge bay windows to the east front and a "strange Egyptian-style room" to the south in 1905. These were removed by Mr Bennett, owner from 1925–45, who worked to restore the original Tudor appearance of the house.

The interior contains plaster ceilings, screens, fireplaces, doorcases and a "magnificent" staircase" of very high quality, some from the 17th century and some from later re-modelling. The Monmouthshire author and artist, Fred Hando, visited the house in the early 1950s and described it is his book Journeys in Gwent. Hando recorded the "seventeenth century decorated plaster work ceiling" in the great hall, and the fire-back, dated 1694, which had previously formed a bridge over a nearby stream. John Newman records the view of the Secretary of the Royal Commission on the Ancient and Historical Monuments of Wales who suggests that some of the plaster ceilings, long considered to be Jacobean, may in fact be careful re-modellings of the early 20th century by the architectural partnership of Bodley and Garner, who were undertaking contemporaneous remodelling at Powis Castle. Cadw also notes this uncertainty as to the actual dates for the ceilings, recording that "all the decorative plaster ceilings are of a character and would either be 17th century or Victorian reproduction(s)".

The staircase rises in an extension of the late 17th century by John Arnold. It is variously described as of "yew" (by Coflein), or of "oak" (by Cadw). On the turn are two early 20th century stained glass windows, depicting Elizabeth I and Charles I and his family, both of whom are traditionally supposed to have visited the court. The stair leads to the former great chamber. Above this is a long room, stretching the whole of the entrance front and which Cadw suggests may have been a long gallery of the Arnolds' time. The court is a Grade I listed building.

== Garden and estate ==
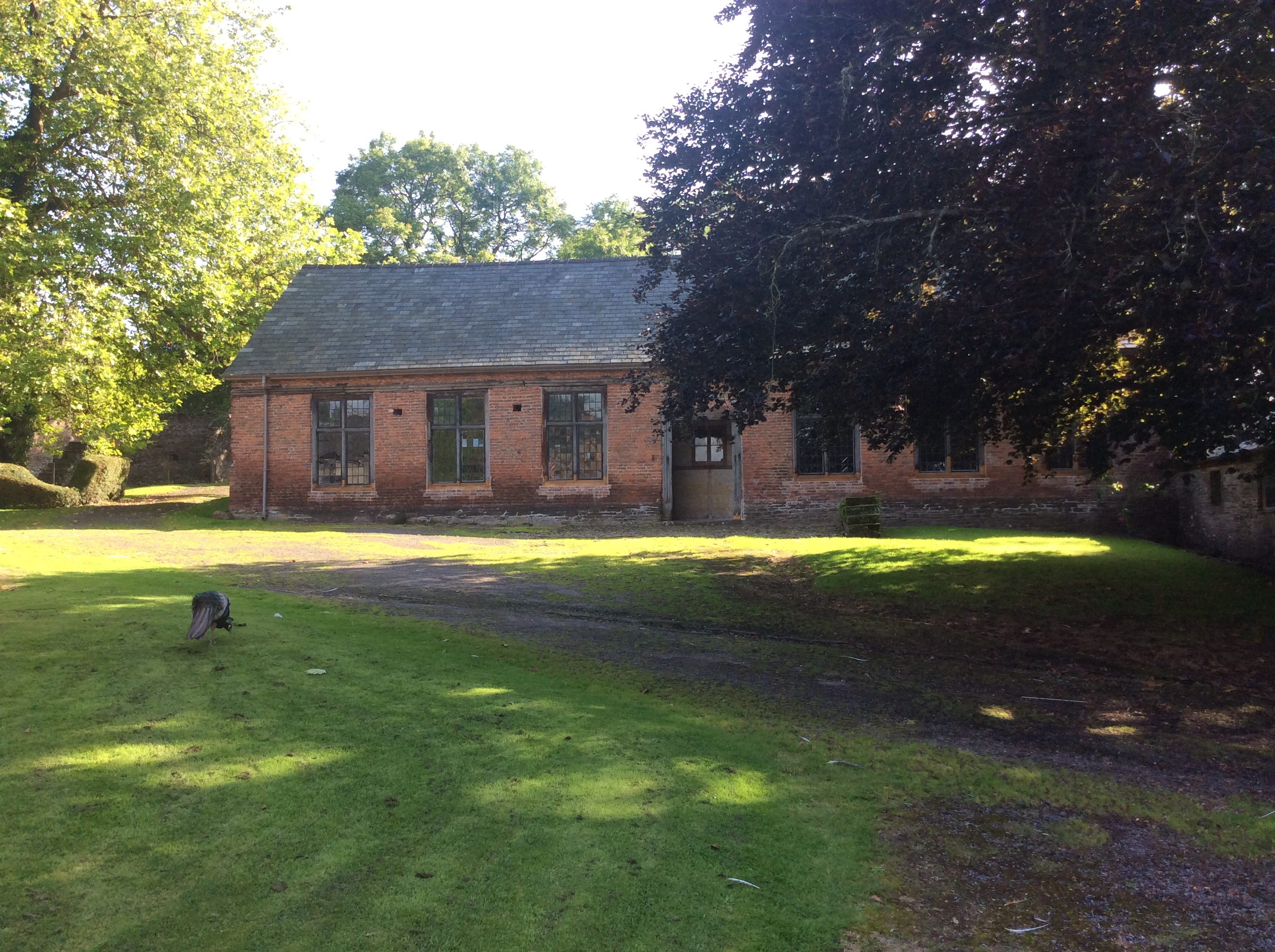
The Stable block

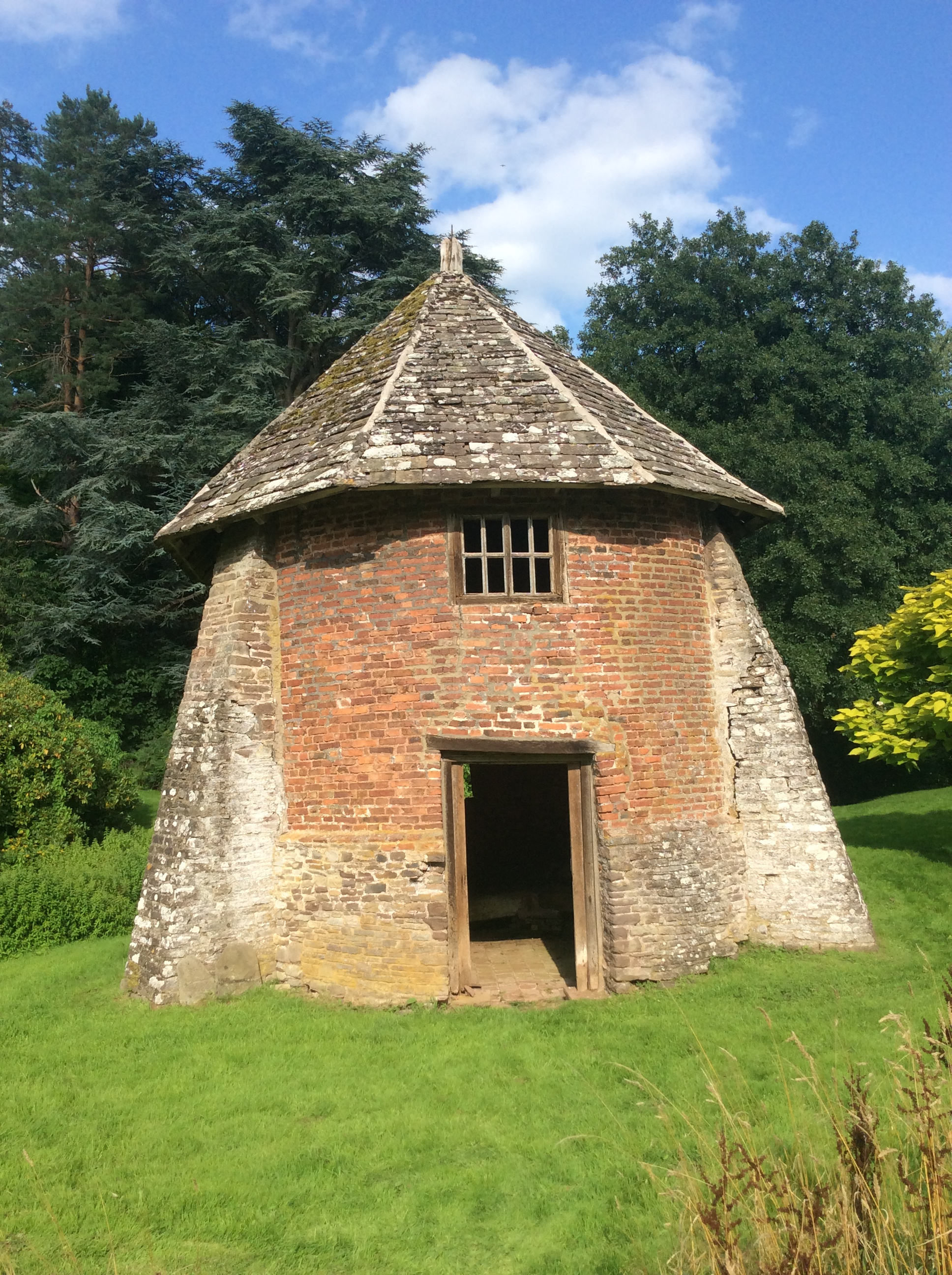
The Garden House

The grounds and outbuildings are also of note. Nicholas Arnold laid out the gardens to the court in the mid-17th century. An oil painting in the hall shows the results. The plan is axial, the court at the centre, surrounded by terraces, and with two long avenues of trees, pines to the north and sweet chesnuts to the south. The gardening writer Helena Attlee notes Arnold's intention to "broadcast wealth, power and permanence". Writing in 1953, C.J.O. Evans commented that the "Scots pine are 200 years old, and many of them are now nearly dead". The gardens at Llanvihangel are listed at Grade I on the Cadw/ICOMOS Register of Parks and Gardens of Special Historic Interest in Wales.

The Stable Block is "a great rarity dating from 1630–40 and largely unaltered". It is a Grade I listed building in its own right. Near the lake there is a small brick summerhouse, also called the Guardhouse or Garden House, which was originally one of a pair completing a walled enclosure around the court. Attlee suggests there might have been three such structures, although the third may have been a dovecote. The Garden House has its own Grade II* listed designation.

Other buildings in the courtyard complex and gardens with their own Grade II listings include the barn attached to the stables, the cider house, the coach house, the garden walls, terraces and gate piers and the walled garden.
