= John Powell (judge) =

Welsh judge (c. 1633 – 1696)

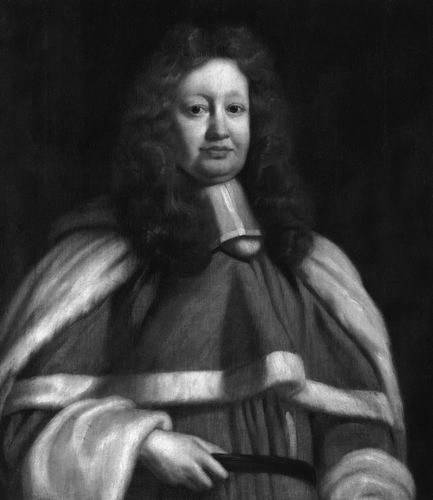

Judge of the Court of Common Pleas
- In office 1686–1687

Judge of the Court of King's Bench
- In office 1687–1688

Personal details
- Born: 1632 or 1633
- Died: 7 September 1696
- Children: Sir Thomas Powell, 1st Baronet
- Education: Jesus College, Oxford; King's College, Cambridge
- Occupation: lawyer and judge

Sir John Powell (1632 or 1633 – 7 September 1696) was a Welsh judge on the Court of Common Pleas and the Court of King's Bench. He presided over the trial of the Seven Bishops in 1688.

== Early life and education ==
Born in 1632 or 1633, Powell was from Pentre Meurig, Llanwrda in Carmarthenshire, Wales. He was the son of John Powell and Mary, daughter of Bennett Fortescue.

He became a member of Gray's Inn in 1650, and matriculated at Jesus College, Oxford. He obtained his Bachelor of Arts degree in 1653 and his Master of Arts degree from King's College, Cambridge in the following year. He was called to the bar in 1657.

=== Pentre Meurig ===
Powell lived at Pentre Meurig, or Pentremeurig, a 16th-century Elizabethan mansion in Llanwrda, which had 7 hearths in 1670. Later it possibly operated as a woollen factory, and it is now the site of a farmhouse.

== Career ==
Details of his legal practice are unknown until his rapid promotion in April 1686, when he became a serjeant-at-law and was then appointed as a judge of the Court of Common Pleas and knighted. He was soon asked his opinion of the decision in Godden v Hales that the king could dispense with compliance with Acts of Parliament, and he agreed with the majority view that this was permitted.

He was transferred to the Court of King's Bench in 1687. In that court, he was one of the judges who imposed a fine of £30,000 upon the Earl of Devonshire, and was the presiding judge at the trial of the Seven Bishops for seditious libel. At this trial, he was opposed to the king's power to suspend laws in ecclesiastical matters, taking the view that there would be no parliament if this was allowed. As a result, he was sidelined after the trial ended in July 1688, returning to the post of a judge of the Court of Common Pleas in 1689 after the Glorious Revolution. He was summonsed to the House of Lords to explain the fine imposed on the Earl of Devonshire, which was said to be a violation of the principles of Magna Carta and of the privileges of the peers. He asked the pardon of the House, saying that he had been misled by some books that he looked upon as authorities.

== Personal life and death ==
Powell built and lived at Broadway Mansion in Laugharne and died in Exeter on 7 September 1696. There is a memorial tablet in St Martin's Church, Laugharne where he was buried and which some biographers believe was his place of birth.

His son Sir Thomas, of Broadway, Carmarthenshire and Coldbrook, Monmouthshire, was attorney-general of the Carmarthen circuit, 1695–1715, Member of Parliament for Monmouth, 1705–8, and for Carmarthenshire, 1710–15. He was created a baronet in 1698, but the title became extinct on the death of his son Herbert in 1721.
