= Giles Morgan =

16th-century Welsh politician

Giles Morgan (by 1515 – 9 March 1570), of Newport, Monmouthshire, was a Welsh politician.

He was a member (MP) of the parliament of England for Monmouth Boroughs in 1547.
