= 1901 Monmouth Boroughs by-election =

UK parliamentary by-election

1901 Monmouth Boroughs
← 1900	7 May 1901	1906 →

Candidate	Lawrence	Spicer
Party	Conservative	Liberal
Popular vote	4,604	4,261
Percentage	51.9%	48.1%
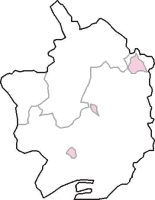
MP before election
Frederick Harris
Conservative
Subsequent MP
Lewis Haslam
Liberal

The 1901 Monmouth Boroughs by-election was a by-election held on 7 May 1901 for the British House of Commons constituency of Monmouth Boroughs.

The by-election was triggered by the unseating of the Conservative Party Member of Parliament (MP) Frederick Rutherfoord Harris, as a result of an election petition alleging irregularities in election spending. The Liberal candidate was Albert Spicer, who had previously been the sitting MP but had lost in the previous general election. The result was a victory for the Conservative candidate Sheriff Joseph Lawrence, who held the seat, although the party's majority was halved.

== Result ==
1901 Monmouth Boroughs by-election
Party	Candidate	Votes	%	±%
Conservative	Joseph Lawrence	4,604	51.9	−2.3
Liberal	Albert Spicer	4,261	48.1	+2.3
Majority		343	1.8	−4.6
Turnout		8,865	90.4	+3.2
Registered electors		9,803		
Conservative hold		Swing	-2.3	

== Aftermath ==
Despite the intervention of a Labour Representation Committee candidate, the Liberal Party gained the seat;

General election 1906 Monmouth Boroughs
Party	Candidate	Votes	%	±%
Liberal	Lewis Haslam	4,531	44.7	−3.4
Conservative	E E Micholls	3,939	38.8	−13.1
Labour Repr. Cmte.	James Whinstone	1,678	16.5	N/A
Majority		592	5.9	N/A
Turnout		10,148	90.6	+3.4
Registered electors		11,207		
Liberal gain from Conservative		Swing	+4.8	

== See also ==
- Lists of United Kingdom by-elections
- Monmouth Boroughs constituency
