= Edward Carbutt =

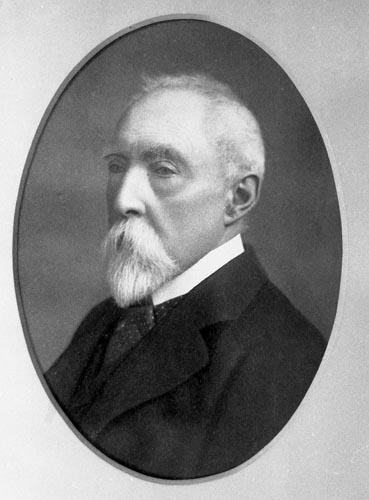
Edward Carbutt

Sir Edward Hamer Carbutt, 1st Baronet (22 July 1838 – 8 October 1905) was an English mechanical engineer and a Liberal politician. He served as President of the Institution of Mechanical Engineers.

== Biography ==
Carbutt was the youngest son of Francis Carbutt (1792–1874) of Chapel Allerton in Leeds. His father was a merchant and some-time mayor of Leeds and his elder sister Louisa Carbutt was an educationalist. He was a linen and cloth merchant who became a justice of the peace, Lord Mayor of Leeds in 1848/1849, and a director of the Huddersfield and Manchester Railway.

Edward Carbutt went into business as a mechanical engineer in Leeds. When he was 24 (circa 1862) he entered into partnership with the engineer Robinson Thwaites (1811–1884) in the Vulcan Iron Works at Bradford. Carbutt and Thwaites exhibited a 'Patent Double-Action Self-Acting Steam Hammer' at the 1862 London Exhibition. Carbutt and Thwaites petitioned for a further patent 'for the invention of improvements in hammers to be worked by steam or other fluid' in 1867.

He was a member of the Institution of Mechanical Engineers and of the Institution of Civil Engineers.

He entered local politics and was Mayor of Leeds in 1878 and in this role laid the foundation stone of civic buildings. In 1880 he was elected as MP for Monmouth Boroughs and held the seat until 1886. On 1 October 1892, he was made a baronet, of Nanhurst in the parish of Cranleigh in the County of Surrey. In 1896 he was appointed High Sheriff of Surrey.

In 1887 Carbutt was elected President of the Institution of Mechanical Engineers. He represented the Institute on the committee of the National Physical Laboratory. He was also a vice president of the Iron and Steel Institute. In 1891 he was concerned with the erection of a tower at Wembley to rival the Eiffel Tower in Paris.

In 1874 Carbutt married Mary Rhodes. The baronetcy became extinct on his death.

Parliament of the United Kingdom
Preceded by Thomas Cordes	Member of Parliament for Monmouth Boroughs; 1880–1886	Succeeded by Sir George Elliot
Professional and academic associations
Preceded by Jeremiah Head	President of the Institution of Mechanical Engineers; 1887–1888	Succeeded by Charles Cochrane
Baronetage of the United Kingdom
New creation	Baronet (of Nanhurst); 1892–1905	Extinct
Preceded by Wiggin baronets	Carbutt baronets of Nanhurst; 1 October 1892	Succeeded by Dixon-Hartland baronets
