= Reginald Blewitt =

British member of parliament

Reginald James Blewitt
- Born: 26 May 1799; Marylebone, Middlesex, England
- Died: 11 September 1878 (aged 79); Roehampton, Surrey, England
- Known for: Collieries, canals and railways
- Predecessor: Benjamin Hall
- Successor: Crawshay Bailey
- Political party: Whig

Reginald James Blewitt (1799–1878) was a British MP. He built up the Monmouthshire Merlin newspaper and refurbished Llantarnam Abbey.

== Biography ==
Blewitt was born in 1799 to Edward and Amelia Blewitt. His father was descended from the powerful Morgan family of Newport. In 1827 Blewitt published a satirical poem that was published as a 106-page book about the characters of the Chancery Court.

Blewitt obtained ownership of Llantarnam Abbey which had historically been a Catholic home for centuries. Blewitt restored the abbey as his home in 1836. In 1837, he was elected as an M.P. for the Monmouthshire Boroughs.

== Newport Uprising ==
Blewitt played a minor role in the Newport Rising when three groups of Chartists descended onto Newport to release from custody a fellow chartist. Two of the groups arrived at the Hotel in Newport and they were turned back by armed soldiers who fired on the rioters. The third group from Pontypool led by William Jones was too late and it had been met on the road by Blewitt who cautioned the men against insurrection. Blewitt was a well known critic of Chartism via his Newport paper. However the group continued and only scattered after they were told of the chartists shot dead and wounded in Newport. Meanwhile, Blewitt had travelled through Caerleon to the site of the riot where he took over the role of Mayor as he had been wounded. Jones and two others were eventually transported for their part in the uprising.

== Cwmbran iron works ==
The growth of the iron works at Cwmbran in the middle of the nineteenth century was due to Blewitt's ownership. In 1847 he was establishing a patent for a method of creating malleable iron. This iron works continued as a major employer in the area until 1970.

== Politician, journalist and writer ==
Blewitt had financial trouble in 1851. His effort to have his seat taken over by a shipping entrepreneur named William Schaw Lindsay was unsuccessful. Blewitt resigned from the House of Commons in March 1852 recommending Lindsay as his successor, but it was Crawshay Bailey who took the seat. It was Blewitt who created the Monmouthshire Merlin which grew to have the largest circulation in Wales in 1854, despite the Monmouthshire Beacon targeting him personally. The Beacon had been organised several years after the Merlin, started by Sir Joseph Bailey and other Monmouthshire conservatives, and it embarrassed other newspapers with the ferocity of its attacks on Blewitt. However Blewitt described anonymously Octavius Morgan, who was a fellow M.P. and distant cousin, as flippant "in his youth", overbearing, arrogant, short, squeaky voiced and effeminate.

Parliament of the United Kingdom
Preceded by Benjamin Hall	Member of Parliament for Monmouth Boroughs; 1837–1852	Succeeded by Crawshay Bailey
