= Crawshay Bailey =

English industrialist (1789 – 1872)

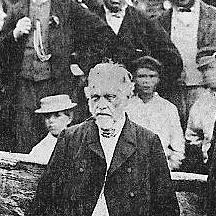
- Born: 1789; Great Wenham, Suffolk
- Died: 1872 (aged 82–83)
- Occupation: Ironmaster
- Political party: Conservative

Crawshay Bailey (1789 – 9 January 1872) was an English industrialist who became one of the great iron-masters of Wales.

== Early life ==
Bailey was born in 1789 in Great Wenham, Suffolk, the son of John Bailey, of Wakefield and his wife Susannah. His parents had moved from Normanton, near Wakefield in around 1780 by which time they had already had at least three children (Ann, Elizabeth and William). Crawshay was the youngest of six children to be born in Great Wenham (the others being Susan, Joseph, John, and Thomas). His mother, Susannah was the sister of Richard Crawshay, the ironmaster based at Cyfarthfa Castle near Merthyr Tydfil where Crawshay Bailey came at the age of twelve to work for his rich uncle in 1801, joining his elder brother Joseph. In 1809 he was a witness to his rich uncle's will, in which he was bequeathed the sum of £1,000 (equivalent to £90,000 in 2024).

== Early business career: the iron master ==
Crawshay Bailey's early career was overshadowed by that of his elder brother, Joseph, later Sir Joseph Bailey, 1st Baronet, who, on his uncle's death in 1810 inherited 25% of the Cyfarthfa Works where he had been the manager. Joseph Bailey sold his share in Cyfarthfa, and together with Matthew Wayne later of Gadlys, Aberdare, he bought Nantyglo Ironworks from the Blaenavon Iron Company. At some point, Crawshay joined his brother at Nant-y-glo and, upon Wayne's departure to Aberdare, he became a partner with his brother in 1820. They afterwards bought the Beaufort ironworks and several collieries in the vicinity.

For a time he also ran the ironworks at Rhymney, and while there he constructed a tramway between Rhymney and Bassaleg near Newport.

== Crawshay Bailey and the coal industry ==
In contrast to most of his fellow iron masters, Bailey recognised the potential for the future development of the coal industry in South Wales, and far-sightedly bought up large areas of coal-rich land, at their agricultural value too, in the Rhondda Valleys, at Mountain Ash and Aberaman and was prepared to sit on these assets for nearly ninety years before developing them as some of the richest coal and iron ore deposits in the world.

In a similar manner he waited until the most auspicious time before applying for an act of Parliament to open and run a railway company. In 1845 he was instrumental in setting up the Aberdare Railway, along with Sir John Josiah Guest to capitalise on further assets in the form of sinking new collieries and building new blast furnaces.

He also promoted railways between Coleford, in the Forest of Dean, via Monmouth and Usk to Pontypool.

Soon after the Aberdare Railway was built, the Aberaman Ironworks and a number of collieries associated with it were opened. Bailey remained the owner of the Aberaman Estate but despite the profitability of his colliery activities, the depression in the iron trade meant that the enterprise did not prove as successful as Bailey had hoped so he decided to sell the Aberaman estate and return to Monmouthshire. He disposed of the entire Aberaman estate including its collieries, ironworks, brickworks and private railway, to the Powell Duffryn Steam Coal Co. by indenture dated 2 February 1867 for the sum of £123,500.

He was anti trade union and opposed to his workers organising themselves along these lines.

== Political career ==
He had already been appointed High Sheriff of Brecknockshire in 1837 and also held the same office in Monmouthshire in 1850. He was a Conservative Member of Parliament (MP) for Monmouth Boroughs from 1852 to 1868 and was elected in five successive parliamentary elections.

== Later life ==
By 1867 he owned iron works, blast furnaces, coalmines, tramways, railways and brickworks. He retired in this year, selling off all his assets over the next three years. Before 1851 he had retired to Llanfoist near Abergavenny, where he lived in Llanfoist House. Llanfoist Primary School had a house named after him.

He died in 1872, aged 83, after at least seventy years in industry. His only son, and heir, Crawshay Bailey, Junior (born 1841), inherited.

John Griffith, rector of Merthyr, said of Crawshay Bailey:

He was the last and among the first of our great Iron Kings. He helped to develop this country before an iron rail was ever laid down on it. To the very last moment of his life he gave the whole of his energies to increase its manufacture. From the moment he joined his uncle at Cyfarthfa, a boy of twelve, till he died the other day at Llanfoist House, an aged man of 84, he never left the iron country, nor lost sight once of its steam and smoke. No manors, or parks, or aldermanic honours, or castles, or sea side palaces, ever drew him away from the grime and the soot of the smoky "Welsh Hills."

—

== Popular culture ==
Crawshay Bailey was the original subject of the song now usually corrupted to Cosher Bailey

Crawshay Bailey had an Engine
It was always needin' mendin'
And dependin' on its power
It could do four miles an hour
Did you ever saw
Did you ever saw
Did you ever saw
Such a funny thing before?

(and so on—many, many verses in different versions)

Crawshay Bailey is also mentioned by name in the song "Ironmasters" on The Men They Couldn't Hang album Night of a Thousand Candles.

== Sources ==
- Price, Watkin William (1959). "BAILEY family, of Nant-y-glo, Aberaman, etc.". Dictionary of Welsh Biography. National Library of Wales.

Parliament of the United Kingdom
| Preceded by Reginald Blewitt | Member of Parliament for Monmouth Boroughs; 1852–1868 | Succeeded by Sir John Ramsden |
Honorary titles
| Preceded by John Lloyd Vaughan Watkins | High Sheriff of Brecknockshire; 1837 | Succeeded by James Duncan Thomson |
| Preceded by John Arthur Edward Herbert | High Sheriff of Monmouthshire; 1851 | Succeeded by Ferdinand Hanbury-Williams |
