= Edward Herbert (of the Grange) =

English politician

Edward Herbert was an English politician who sat in the House of Commons in 1656. He was a prominent supporter of Oliver Cromwell.

Herbert was described as Cromwell's right-hand man and was appointed member of High Court of Justice in June 1651. On 4 September 1655 he was in possession of the lands of The Grange probably by lease from the county commissioners for sequestration. The land was the property of Henry Lord Herbert of Raglan who petitioned on that date to be allowed quiet enjoyment of the estate. In 1656, Herbert was elected Member of Parliament for Monmouthshire in the Second Protectorate Parliament. By 1661 Herbert had removed to Bristol and was taken into custody for some reason on 10 November 1661.

Parliament of England
Preceded by Henry Herbert; Thomas Hughes; Thomas Morgan	Member of Parliament for Monmouthshire; 1656; With: Major General James Berry; John Nicholas; Nathaniel Waterhouse	Succeeded by John Nicholas; William Morgan
