= Charles Herbert (MP died 1605) =

English politician

Charles Herbert (died 1605), of Hadnock, Monmouthshire, was a Welsh politician.

He was a member (MP) of the parliament of England for Monmouth Boroughs in 1571.
