= Thomas Ravenscroft (MP) =

English politician

- Died: 18 February 1681
- Known for: Politician for Monmouthshire
- Spouse: Margaret Williams

Thomas Ravenscroft (died 18 February 1681) was an English politician who sat in the House of Commons from 1621 to 1622.

== Biography ==
Ravenscroft was probably the son of William Ravenscroft who was MP for Flintshire in 1586. In 1621, Ravenscroft was elected Member of Parliament for Monmouth Boroughs.

In November 1643, as Colonel Ravenscroft, he surrendered Hawarden Castle to Parliament. He was appointed with others to manage Flintshire on behalf of parliament in May 1648.

Ravenscroft died in 1681 and was buried at Holy Trinity Church, Cheshire, where there is a monument.

Ravenscroft married Margaret Williams daughter of Sir Thomas Williams, 2nd Baronet of Vaynol Carnarvonshire.

Parliament of England
Preceded by Robert Johnson	Member of Parliament for Monmouth Boroughs; 1621–1622	Succeeded by Walter Stewart
