= Trevor baronets =

Extinct baronetcy in the Baronetage of England

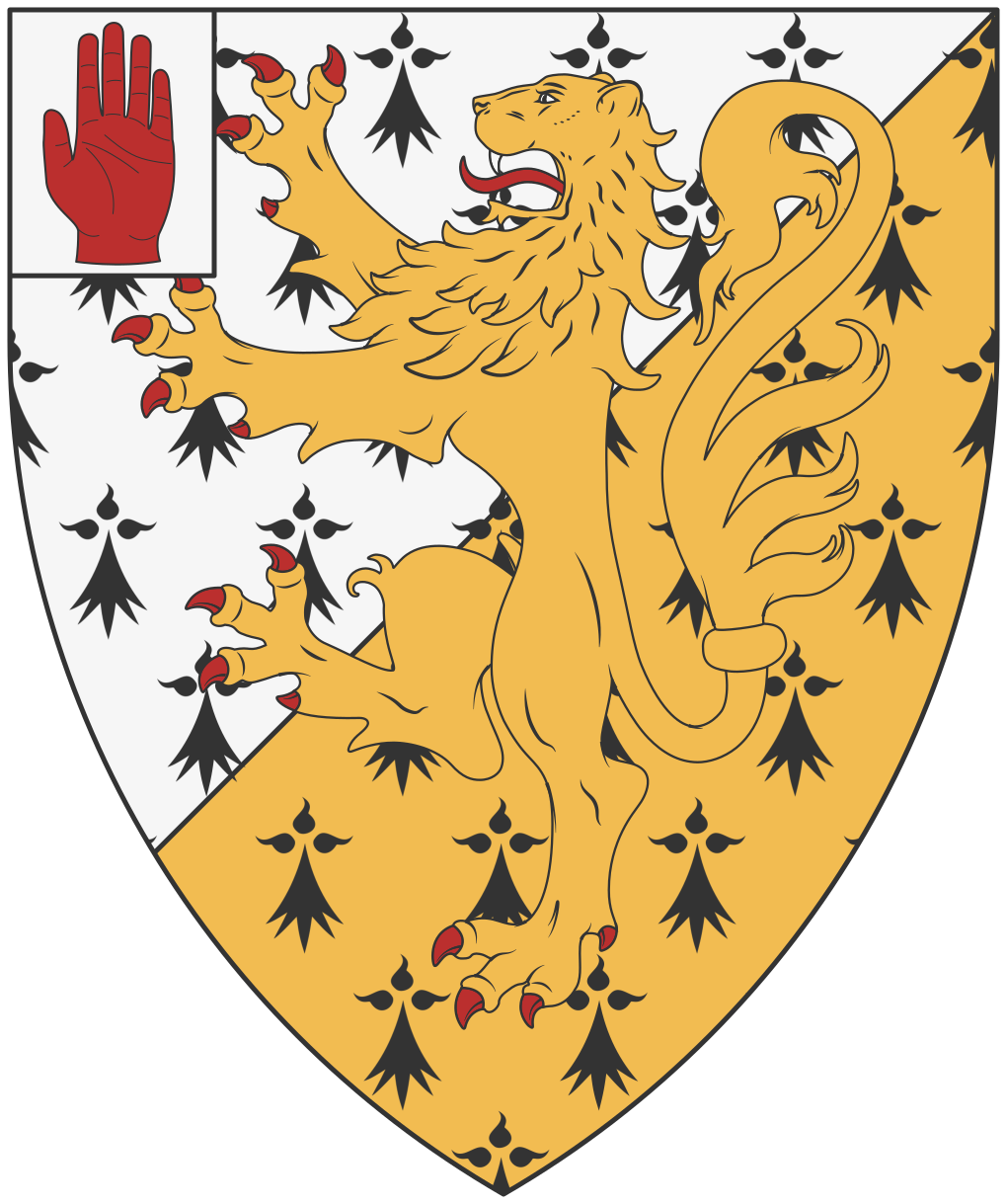
Arms of Trevor of Enfield, Middlesex

The Trevor Baronetcy, of Enfield in the county of Middlesex, was created in the Baronetage of England on 11 August 1641 for Thomas Trevor. He had no children and the title became extinct on his death in 1676.

The arms of Sir Thomas Trevor were Party per bend sinister, ermine and erminois, a lion rampant or.

== Trevor baronets, of Enfield, Middlesex (1641) ==
- Sir Thomas Trevor, 1st Baronet (c. 1612–1676)
