= Charles Cochrane (engineer) =

British engineer

Charles Cochrane (1835 Dudley, Worcestershire – 1898) was a British engineer. He was a leading authority on blast furnaces. He secured a patent for dehumidifying air.

== Life ==
In 1850, he studied at King's College London. He worked with Samuel Holden Blackwell, at Russell's Hall Iron Works, and other blast-furnaces, mills and forges.

His father, Alexander Brodie Cochrane, was the owner of Woodside Iron Works. In 1855, he went to the Ormesby Iron Works. In 1856, he became a partner with his father.

The Woodside Iron Works supplied many important structures, including the Holborn Viaduct, Westminster Bridge, Cannon Street Railway Bridge, Charing Cross railway station, and the Runcorn Railway Bridge. They helped relocate the Hungerford Suspension Bridge from the Thames to the Clifton Suspension Bridge at Bristol.

Professional and academic associations
Preceded by Edward Hamer Carbutt	President of the Institution of Mechanical Engineers; 1889	Succeeded by Joseph Tomlinson
