= Sir Thomas Trevor, 1st Baronet =

Welsh politician

Sir Thomas Trevor 1st Baronet
- Born: ca. 1612
- Died: 5 February 1676
- Occupation: Politician

Sir Thomas Trevor, 1st Baronet (c. 1612 – 5 February 1676) was a Welsh politician who sat in the House of Commons of England variously between 1640 and 1648.

== Life ==
Trevor was the son of Sir Thomas Trevor of Trevalyn Denbighs, Lord Baron of the Exchequer. He was an auditor for Duchy of Lancaster in 1640, In November 1640, he was returned as Member of Parliament for Monmouth in the Long Parliament. There was a double return with William Watkins which was not resolved immediately. When some of the voters petitioned against the result, his opponent was forced to stop sitting as an MP until the dispute could be resolved. Meanwhile, he has created a baronet (of Enfield in Middlesex) on 11 August 1641. His election was finally declared void in November 1644. By this time, Parliament had suspended by-elections to fill vacancies because of the Civil War, and when they resumed Trevor was instead elected MP for Tregony in 1647. He was, however, excluded from the Commons in Pride's Purge the following December.

After the Restoration, Trevor was made a Knight of the Bath at the coronation of Charles II. He died in February 1676.

== Family ==
Trevor married c.1632 Anne Jenner, daughter of Robert Jenner, a prosperous London silver merchant who had bought estates in Wiltshire. He married secondly Mary, daughter of Samuel Fortrey of Kew Palace. They had no children and the baronetcy became extinct on his death. His estates passed to Sir Charles Wheler, grandson of Mary, a sister of Sir Thomas Trevor's father.

Parliament of England
Preceded by Sir Richard Vyvyan; John Polwhele	Member of Parliament for Tregony; 1647–1648; With: John Carew	Succeeded by John Thomas; Edward Boscawen
Baronetage of England
New creation	Baronet (of Enfield); 1641–1676	Extinct
