= Joseph Tomlinson (railway engineer) =

British engineer (1823–1894)

- Born: 11 November 1823; London, United Kingdom
- Died: 22 April 1894 (aged 70); West Hampstead, United Kingdom

Joseph Tomlinson (11 November 1823 – 22 April 1894) was a British railway engineer, and executive.

== Life ==
Joseph Tomlinson was born in London on 11 November 1823. After leaving school in 1837, he joined his father, who was passenger superintendent, at the Stockton and Darlington Railway.

From 1846 to 1852, he was outdoor foreman for J. V. Gooch. In 1851, at the time of the Great Exhibition, he was working for the London and South Western Railway, and often drove the special train which took Prince Albert from Windsor to Waterloo and back, often accompanied by his two sons, the Prince of Wales and Prince Alfred. From 1854 to 1858, Outdoor Superintendent to Matthew Kirtley for the Midland Railway. From 1872 to 1885, he was resident engineer and locomotive superintendent of the Metropolitan Railway.

He was President of the Institution of Mechanical Engineers in 1890 and 1891, and Chairman of the Research Committee on Friction.

He died in West Hampstead on 22 April 1894.

Professional and academic associations
| Preceded by Charles Cochrane | President of the Institution of Mechanical Engineers; 1889 | Succeeded by William Anderson (engineer) |
