= Edward Hubberd =

16th-century English politician

Edward Hubberd (died 1602), of Birchanger and Stansted Mountfitchet, Essex, was an English politician.

He was a member (MP) of the parliament of England for Monmouth Boroughs in 1593 and for Lancaster in 1597.
