= William Morgan (of Machen and Tredegar) =

Welsh landowner and politician

- Born: c. 1640
- Died: 28 April 1680
- Children: Blanche Morgan; John Morgan (of Rhiwpera)

William Morgan (c. 1640 – 28 April 1680) was a Welsh landowner and politician who sat in the House of Commons of England between 1659 and 1680.

== Life ==
William Morgan was the eldest son and heir of Sir Thomas Morgan (died 1664), and his second wife Elizabeth Wyndham daughter of Francis Wyndham of Sandhill Park, Bishop's Lydeard, Somerset. His brother was John Morgan. William was a student at Queen's College, Oxford in 1656 and at Gray's Inn in 1658.

He was first returned as a Member of Parliament for Monmouthshire to the Third Protectorate Parliament in 1659. He was proposed as a Knight of the Royal Oak for Monmouthshire in 1660, and continued to represent the county in the House of Commons until his death.

== Family ==
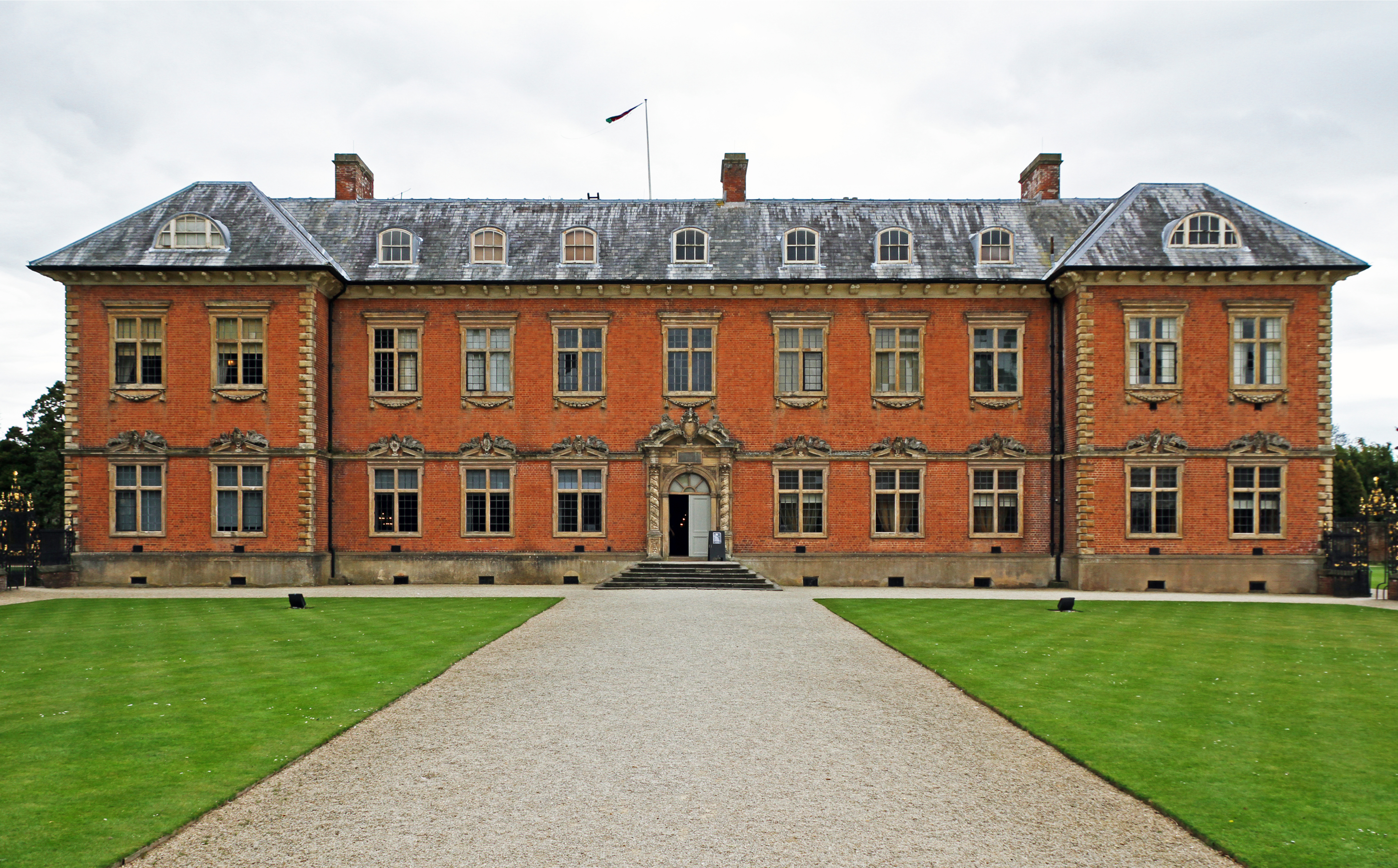
Tredegar House

Morgan married his first cousin Blanche Morgan, daughter of his father's sister, Elizabeth Morgan, and William Morgan, on 4 November 1661. He rebuilt Tredegar House on a very grand scale, with the help of his wife's huge dowry. Blanche inherited her father's estates at Dderw, Brecknockshire in 1658, after the death of her brother William. This gave Morgan and his descendants considerable political influence in the county for generations. His children by Blanche included two sons, Thomas and John, and a daughter, Blanche.

After the death of Blanche on 23 March 1673, Morgan married Elizabeth Dayrell, widow of Sir Francis Dayrell and daughter of William Lewis of Bletchington, Oxfordshire. However, Elizabeth proved to be of unsound mind. Morgan arranged dual marriages between his eldest son, Thomas, and Martha, daughter of Sir Edward Mansel; and between his daughter Blanche (d. 1682) and Mansel's eldest son, Edward.

However, William did not live to see the marriages carried out, dying in London in 1680. Blanche died before marrying Mansel's son, who died unmarried. However, Thomas, who inherited William's estates, did marry Martha Mansel.

Parliament of England
Preceded by John Nicholas; Edward Herbert; Nathaniel Waterhouse	Member of Parliament for Monmouthshire; 1659–1680; With: John Nicholas 1659–1660; Henry, Lord Herbert 1660–1667; Sir Trevor Williams 1667–1679, 1679–1680; Charles, Lord Herbert 1679	Succeeded by Sir Trevor Williams; Sir Edward Morgan, Bt
