= Sir Trevor Williams, 1st Baronet =

Welsh gentry landowner and politician

Sir Trevor Williams, 1st Baronet (c. 1623 – 1692) of Llangibby (Welsh: Llangybi), Monmouthshire, was a Welsh gentry landowner and politician who sat in the House of Commons at various times between 1660 and 1692. He played a significant part in events during and after the English Civil War in South Wales, siding first with King Charles, then with the Parliamentarians, before rejoining the Royalists in 1648.

== Family and lineage ==
Trevor Williams was a descendant of a marriage in 1300 between Howel Gam ap David of Penrhos Castle and Joyce, a daughter of the Herefordshire based Scudamore family. Roger Williams, Trevor's grandfather and High Sheriff of Monmouthshire, acquired Llangibby Castle in 1545 and adopted the surname Williams (derived from his father's name, William) in 1562. His son, Charles, who became M.P. for Monmouthshire and was knighted in 1621, also became Sheriff of Monmouthshire in 1627. Sir Charles, Trevor's father, was a noted Puritan who presented a fine Jacobean pulpit with the text "Woe Be to Me if I Preach not the Gospel" to Caerwent church in 1632. He died in 1642.

== English Civil War ==
In 1642, Williams, as a well connected local man and strong Protestant, was appointed by the King with a Commission of Array. At the outbreak of what was to become the First English Civil War, this gave him responsibilities for raising an army within Monmouthshire for the King, and holding the county against opposition. He was also created a baronet (one of several Williams baronets in Wales). Having set about his allotted task he was captured by Parliamentary forces in 1643 at Highnam during the Siege of Gloucester. After his release, he set about fortifying the ruined medieval Tregrug Castle at Llangibby, beside the Caerleon to Usk road, and garrisoned it with 60 men. In 1644 he helped lead operations around Monmouth. After the town was lost to the Parliamentarians he pleaded with Prince Rupert for more men and ammunition, following which he helped lead its recapture.

As a tenant of the Earl of Pembroke, as were his family before him, he naturally took up the shared feud with the successive holders of the title Duke of Somerset. He especially came to resent the favours of the King to the Catholic Robert Carr, 1st Earl of Somerset, and the Earl of Glamorgan's plan to bring in Irish soldiers to south east Wales. He resisted the recruiting activities of Sir Jacob Astley, 1st Baron Astley of Reading for the King across South Wales in 1645, and was immediately arrested at Abergavenny. He was quickly bailed, the King recognising his power base in the area, whereupon he seized and held nearby Monmouth Castle, this time against the King. In 1646, he helped relieve the Parliamentarians besieged in Cardiff and was temporarily given the role of Commander in Monmouthshire. However, he lost this position after a few months, and also failed to secure sufficient patronage to allow him to be elected as a Member of Parliament. He then fought at the bitter and lengthy siege of Raglan Castle on the side of Parliament, the winning side.

However, by the time the Second English Civil War was developing, Williams had become alarmed at Cromwell's ascendancy, and in particular Cromwell's decision to give himself lands in Glamorgan and Monmouthshire, including Chepstow Castle, which he had coveted for himself. As a result, in 1648 he helped Sir Nicholas Kemeys, 1st Baronet and Custos Rotulorum of Monmouthshire, to seize and hold Chepstow for the King. Cromwell's response was to storm Chepstow, regaining it and arresting and seizing the lands of the rebels involved. Williams' lands were sequestered by Parliament but he appealed and his lands were returned to him.

On his release, Williams bought further lands which had belonged to others who had their lands sequestered, particularly in and around St Mellons between Cardiff and Newport. He was reconciled to the Protectorate by 1657, to the extent of temporarily abandoning his title of baronet. However, with The Restoration of 1660, he was made Colonel of the county militia, to help disarm the radicals and win their support.

== Political career ==
In 1660, Williams was elected Member of Parliament for Monmouth in the Convention Parliament. He was elected MP for Monmouthshire in 1667 for the Cavalier Parliament in a strongly contested by-election against the Marquis of Worcester's nominee. He later made a name for himself on anti-Catholic committees. He was elected MP for Monmouth again in March 1679 for the First Exclusion Parliament and MP for Monmouthshire in October 1679 for the Second Exclusion Parliament as a member of the grouping which later became known as Whigs. In 1680 he proposed in the House of Commons that Worcester - who by now had become the Duke of Beaufort - be removed from the royal court and council, on the grounds that he was secretly a "Papist", and that Worcester's garrison at Chepstow should be disbanded.

In 1681 Williams was re-elected MP for Monmouthshire. By 1683 he was accused of fomenting trouble among the youth of Monmouthshire, and in 1684 Beaufort successfully sued him and his ally John Arnold for scandalum magnatum, libel against a peer. Williams was fined £20,000 (equivalent to £2,477,245 in 2007 ) and imprisoned. In 1689 he was elected MP for Monmouthshire again although he was in the King's Bench prison. He died in 1692.

Parliament of England
Preceded by Thomas Pury	Member of Parliament for Monmouth; 1660–1661	Succeeded by Sir George Probert
Preceded by William Morgan; Henry, Lord Herbert	Member of Parliament for Monmouthshire; 1667 - Feb 1679; With: William Morgan	Succeeded by William Morgan; Charles, Lord Herbert*
Preceded by Charles, Lord Herbert*	Member of Parliament for Monmouth; Feb-Sept 1679	Succeeded by Charles, Lord Herbert*
Preceded by William Morgan; Charles, Lord Herbert*	Member of Parliament for Monmouthshire; Aug 1679–1685; With: William Morgan (1679–1680); Sir Edward Morgan, Bt (1680–1685)	Succeeded by Charles, Marquess of Worcester*; Sir Charles Kemeys, Bt
Preceded by Charles, Marquess of Worcester*; Sir Charles Kemeys, Bt	Member of Parliament for Monmouthshire; 1689–1690; With: Charles, Marquess of Worcester	Succeeded by Charles, Marquess of Worcester*; Thomas Morgan
Baronetage of England
New title	Baronet (of Llangibby); 1642–1692	Succeeded by John Williams
