= John Nicholas (of Chepstow) =

John Nicholas was a Welsh soldier and politician who sat in the House of Commons in 1656 and 1659.

Nicholas was of Chepstow and was a captain in Commonwealth army. He became governor of Chepstow in January 1651 and was added to the High Court of Justice on 25 June 1651. In 1656, he was elected Member of Parliament for Monmouthshire in the Second Protectorate Parliament. He was appointed steward to hold courts for conservation of the River Severn from 1656 to 1657 and was governor of Chepstow again in 1659. He was re-elected MP for Monmouthshire for the Third Protectorate Parliament in 1659.

On the Restoration, he went abroad. He received a pardon and a pass as one of those whom the king wished to call home.

Parliament of England
Preceded by Henry Herbert; Thomas Hughes; Thomas Morgan	Member of Parliament for Monmouthshire; 1656–1659; With: Major General James Berry 1656; Nathaniel Waterhouse 1656; Edward Herbert 1656; William Morgan 1659	Succeeded by Restored Rump
