= James Herbert (died 1709) =

Welsh politician

Sir James Herbert (c.1644 – 6 June 1709), of Coldbrook Park, near Abergavenny, Monmouthshire, was a Welsh politician.

He was a member (MP) of the parliament of England for Monmouth Boroughs in 1685.
