= George Probert (MP) =

Welsh politician (1617–1677)

Sir George Probert DL (c. 1617 – 6 January 1677), of Pant glas, Raglan, Monmouthshire, was a Welsh politician.

He was the only son of Henry Probert of Pant Glas. He was knighted in 1643.

He was appointed a Deputy Lieutenant of Monmouthshire and served as such from 1660 to his death.

He was a member (MP) of the parliament of England for Monmouth Boroughs from 1661 to 1677.

He married Magdalen, the daughter of Sir Charles Williams of Llangibby. They had 2 sons and 3 daughters.
