= William Herbert (died 1646) =

English politician

William Herbert (1621–1646) was an English politician who sat in the House of Commons from 1640 to 1644. He supported the Royalist cause in the English Civil War

Herbert was the fifth son of Philip Herbert, 4th Earl of Pembroke, and his wife Susan de Vere, daughter of the 17th earl of Oxford. He matriculated at Exeter College, Oxford, on 29 January 1635 aged 13 and was awarded MA on 31 August 1636. He was of Wilton, Wiltshire.

In November 1640, Herbert was elected Member of Parliament for Monmouthshire and Woodstock in the Long Parliament, and chose to sit for Monmouthshire. He supported the King and was disabled from sitting on 5 February 1644.

Herbert died unmarried at the age of 25.

Parliament of England
Preceded by William Morgan; Walter Rumsey	Member of Parliament for Monmouthshire; 1640–1644; With: Sir Charles Williams 1640–1641; Henry Herbert 1642–1644	Succeeded by Henry Herbert; John Herbert
Preceded by William Lenthall; William Fleetwood	Member of Parliament for Woodstock; 1640; With: William Lenthall	Succeeded by Sir Robert Pye; William Lenthall
