= William Addams Williams =

Welsh lawyer, landowner and politician

William Addams Williams MP

Member of Parliament for Monmouthshire
- In office 1831–1841
- Preceded by: Charles Morgan
- Succeeded by: Octavius Morgan

Personal details
- Born: 10 August 1787 Llangibby Castle, Wales
- Died: 5 September 1861 (aged 74) Llangibby Castle, Wales
- Party: Whig
- Relatives: Samuel Marsh (Maternal grandfather)
- Occupation: Lawyer; Landowner; Politician
- Known for: MP for Monmouthshire

William Addams Williams (10 August 1787 – 5 September 1861) was a Welsh lawyer, landowner and politician. He was a Member of Parliament for Monmouthshire from 1831–41.

== Family ==
He was the eldest son of William Addams Williams of Llangibby Castle, and Caroline Marsh; she was the daughter of Samuel Marsh, who served as Member of Parliament for Chippenham.

Addams Williams married, through his connection and godfather Rev. George Avery Hatch, into a clerical family with a Welsh background at The Ham, Glamorgan. His wife, Anna Louisa Nicholl, was the daughter of Rev. Illtyd Nicholl, of Tredington parish in Worcestershire, and Anne Hatch (sister of George Avery); her brothers included Whitlock Nicholl the physician, and Illtyd Nicholl who inherited property near Usk.

With his wife Anna Louisa, Addams Williams had four children; one son, also named William Addams Williams, and three daughters. William Evans, footballer and cleric, was a grandson.

== Career ==
Addams Williams succeeded his father in 1823, at which point he may have given up his legal practice. He became closely involved in local politics, and in particular in the Monmouth Boroughs constituency. He became the High Sheriff of Monmouthshire in 1827. He was elected MP for the county constituency of Monmouthshire in 1831, as a Whig, at the time of the Great Reform Bill, after Sir Charles Morgan, 2nd Baronet as one of the sitting MPs had voted for a wrecking amendment. He was elected unopposed, a tribute to personal popularity rather than his reformist views, however. He was in fact one of the small group of reformist pushing ministers to go further than the Reform Act 1832 that resulted. Sir Hopton Williams, Addams Williams' great-great-grandfather, was the last person from the family to hold the Monmouth seat, in 1708.

As MP, Addams Williams was involved in a Monmouth roads bill. He spoke against a private enclosure bill, for St Harmon, but it received a second reading. During his career Addams Williams ensured that both local and national newspapers were informed when they omitted or incorrectly inserted him in their published division lists. He resigned his seat in 1841, in bad health.

Parliament of the United Kingdom
Preceded by Lt Col Sir Charles Morgan	Member of Parliament for Monmouthshire; 1831–1841; With: Lord Granville Somerset	Succeeded by Octavius Morgan
