= Robert Sidney, 2nd Earl of Leicester =

English diplomat and politician (1595–1677)

The Earl of Leicester
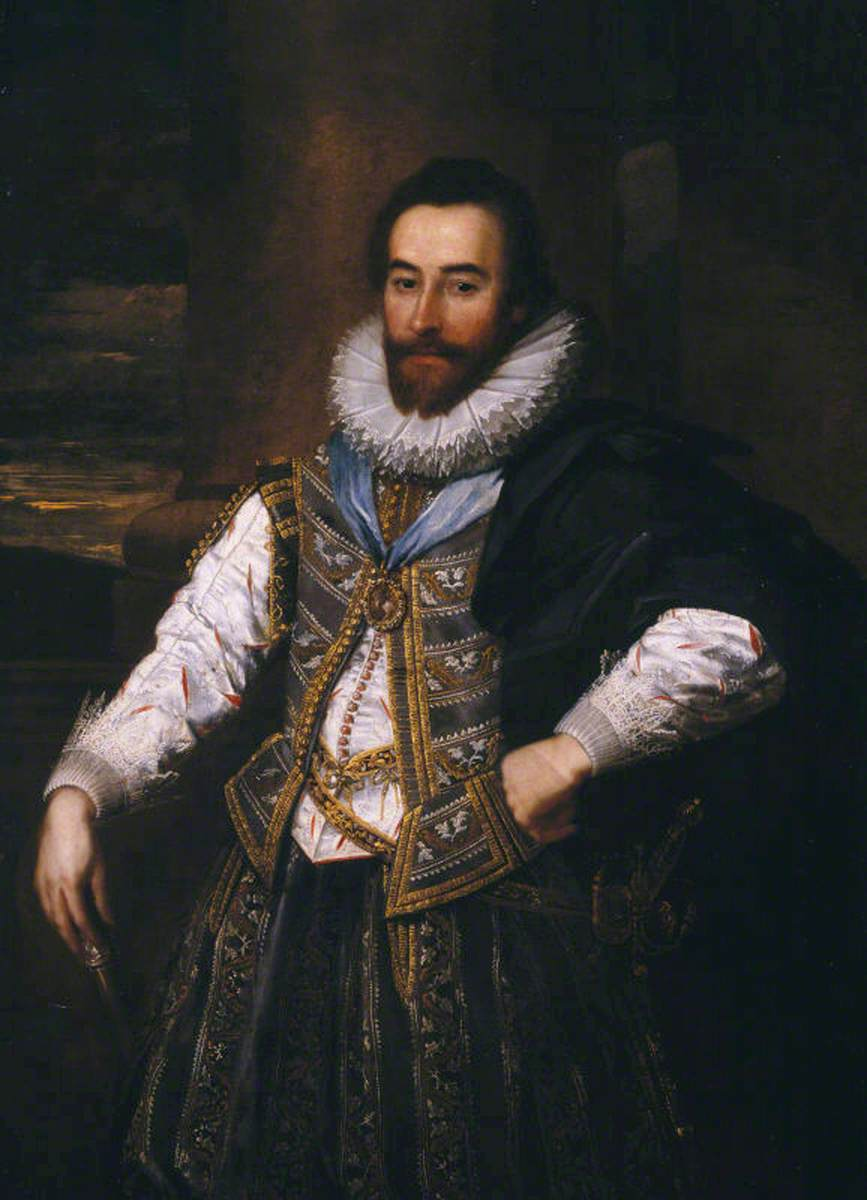

Personal details
- Born: 1 December 1595
- Died: 2 November 1677 (aged 81) Penshurst, Kent, Kingdom of England
- Spouse: Lady Dorothy Percy (m. 1615; died 1659)
- Children: Dorothy Spencer, Countess of Sunderland; Philip Sidney, 3rd Earl of Leicester; Algernon Sidney; Henry Sydney, 1st Earl of Romney; Robert Sidney; Lady Lucy Pelham
- Parent(s): Robert Sidney, 1st Earl of Leicester; Barbara Gamage
- Education: Christ Church, Oxford

Robert Sidney, 2nd Earl of Leicester (1 December 1595 – 2 November 1677) was an English diplomat and politician who sat in the House of Commons between 1614 and 1625 and then succeeded to the peerage as Earl of Leicester.

== Life ==
Sidney was born at Baynard's Castle in London, the son of Robert Sidney, 1st Earl of Leicester, and his first wife, Barbara Gamage. He was educated at Christ Church, Oxford. In 1610 he was created Knight of the Bath when Prince Henry was created Prince of Wales. He was elected Member of Parliament for Wilton in 1614.

Sidney served in the army in the Netherlands during his father's governorship of Flushing, and was given command of an English regiment in the Dutch service in 1616. In 1618 he became a member of Gray's Inn.

In 1620 he had a disagreement with James Hay, Viscount Doncaster, who was his brother-in-law, having married Lucy Percy. He wrote that Hay seemed cold to him, despite their wives being friendly. They argued at Petworth, Sidney struggled with Hay's servants and left his hat behind. Other guests made him feel at fault for arguing with a privy councillor.

He was elected one of the two knights of the shire for Kent in 1621. In 1624 he was elected as the member for Monmouthshire and was re-elected for that county in 1625. In 1626, he succeeded his father as Earl of Leicester. In 1631, he began the construction of Leicester House, a huge mansion on the site of what is now Leicester Square in London. The Crown employed him on a diplomatic mission to Denmark–Norway in 1632 and undertook further diplomatic work in France from 1636 to 1641.

Lord Leicester was then appointed Lord Lieutenant of Ireland in place of The Earl of Strafford. When the governorship of Dublin became vacant, Leicester appointed George Monck. Charles I, however, overruled the appointment in favour of Lord Lambart. In 1643 he resigned without having set foot in Ireland.

Lord Leicester died at Penshurst at the age of nearly 82. He was "esteemed of great learning, observation and veracity".

== Family ==
In 1615, Sidney married Lady Dorothy Percy, the daughter of Henry Percy, 9th Earl of Northumberland and Dorothy Devereux, who was a daughter of Walter Devereux and Lettice Knollys. They had twelve children, including:

- Lady Dorothy (1617–1683); married firstly Henry Spencer, 1st Earl of Sunderland (died 1643), and secondly Sir Robert Smith or Smythe.
- Philip (1619–1697), the 3rd Earl; married Lady Catherine Cecil, daughter of William Cecil, 2nd Earl of Salisbury.
- Henry Sidney, 1st Earl of Romney (1641–1704); died unmarried and without issue.
- Algernon (1622/3–1683); executed for his share in the Rye House Plot, died unmarried and without issue.
- Robert Sidney (1626-1668); a captain (1643), and afterwards colonel, of the English regiment in the Dutch service; Sidney and his regiment, later known as the Buffs, were recalled to England in 1665, and placed upon the English establishment; he died unmarried in August 1668; scandal represented him as the real father of the Duke of Monmouth.
- Lady Lucy (d. 1685); married Sir John Pelham, 3rd Baronet.

Philip and Algernon supported the Parliamentary cause in the English Civil War.

Parliament of England
Preceded by Sir Thomas Edmondes; Hugh Sandford	Member of Parliament for Wilton; 1614; With: Thomas Morgan	Succeeded by Henry Nevill, 9th Baron Bergavenny; Sir Thomas Tracy
Preceded by Sir Peter Manwood; Sir Thomas Walsingham	Member of Parliament for Kent; 1621; With: Sir George Fane	Succeeded by Nicholas Tufton; Sir Edwin Sandys
Preceded by Sir Edmund Morgan; Charles Williams	Member of Parliament for Monmouthshire; 1624–1625; With: Sir William Morgan	Succeeded by Nicholas Arnold; William Herbert
Political offices
Preceded by The Earl of Strafford	Lord Lieutenant of Ireland; 1640–1641	Succeeded by The Marquess of Ormonde
Honorary titles
Preceded by The Earl of Pembroke	Custos Rotulorum of Kent; 1642–1646	Vacant Interregnum
Peerage of England
Preceded by Robert Sidney	Earl of Leicester; 1626–1677	Succeeded by Philip Sidney
