= List of invasions of France =

France has been invaded on numerous occasions, by foreign powers or rival French governments; there have also been unimplemented invasion plans.

- The 978 German invasion during the Franco-German war of 978–980
- The 1230 English invasion of France
- The 1337 Hundred Years' War, led by England and supported by Burgundy, Brittany, and more, it through several phases:
  - The Edwardian War (1337-1360).
  - The Caroline War (1369-1389).
  - John of Gaunt's chevauchée of 1373
  - The Lancastrian War (1415-1453)
- The 1536 Italian War of 1536–1538, Spanish invasion of France
- The 1562 English expedition to France, led by England during the French Wars of Religion
- The 1746 War of the Austrian Succession, Austria-Italian forces supported by the British navy attempted to invade southern France
- The French Revolutionary and Napoleonic Wars invasion attempts to defeat the French Revolution
  - the 1794 Flanders Campaign, led by Britain and Austria
  - the 1795 Battle of Quiberon, led by a British-backed force of French Emigres
  - the 1813 War of the Sixth Coalition, a British-led coalition invaded Napoleon's France to the south while a multi-national coalition attacked from the north (Campaign in north-east France)
  - the 1815 Hundred Days, the Seventh Coalition invaded France following the Battle of Waterloo
- The 1870 Franco-Prussian War, Prussian forces invaded France due to tensions regarding Prussia's growing influence in central Europe
- The 1914 First Battle of the Marne at the outset of World War I
- The World War II invasions:
  - May 1940 Battle of France, started by Nazi Germany's invasion of the Ardennes and the Low countries
  - June 1940 Italian invasion of France
  - June 1944 Operation Overlord, the Allied invasion of Normandy
  - August 1944 Operation Dragoon, the Allied invasion of the south of France

== See also ==
- List of wars involving France
- Category: Invasions by France
