= William Evans (footballer) =

Welsh footballer and churchman

William Addams Williams Evans
Personal information
- Date of birth: September 1853
- Place of birth: Usk, Wales
- Date of death: 23 April 1919 (aged 65)
- Place of death: Monmouthshire, Wales
- Position: Full back

Senior career*
Years	Team	Apps	(Gls)
1876–1877	Oxford University		

International career
1876–1877	Wales	2	(0)
- * Club domestic league appearances and goals

William Addams Williams Evans (September 1853 – 23 April 1919) was a Welsh churchman who played for the Wales national football team, in the first two international matches in 1876 and 1877 before a long career as a Church of England minister.

== Early life and education ==
Evans was born in Usk, Monmouthshire, the son of the local vicar and the grandson of William Addams Williams of Llangibby Castle, the County Magistrate for Monmouthshire, after whom he was named. After completing his education at Shrewsbury School, Evans went up to St John's College, Oxford in 1872.

Evans graduated in 1877 as a Bachelor of Arts and was then ordained as a Church of England curate.

== Church career ==
Evans served as a curate at Barwell in Leicestershire for six years before brief periods at All Saints, Northampton and his last English parish at Harrowden, Bedfordshire.

In 1885, he returned to Monmouthshire becoming rector of Llandegveth in 1886, where he remained until his death in 1919.

== Football career ==
Whilst at Oxford University, Evans played for the university football team but failed to win a blue. In 1876, he replied to an advertisement placed by Llewelyn Kenrick in "The Field" seeking Welsh players to represent their country in a match against Scotland.

Evans was the only player from South Wales selected for the first Welsh international XI. The match was played at Hamilton Crescent, Partick, the home of the West of Scotland Cricket Club on 25 March 1876 and the Welsh were well defeated, conceding four goals without reply. Evans played at right back and acquitted himself well, with the match report commenting: "Evans and Kenrick, the backs, played splendidly for Wales".

The return match came on 5 March 1877 at the Racecourse Ground, Wrexham, with Evans retaining his place in defence. The Scots were again victorious, winning 2–0.
