= Governor Somerset =

Governor Somerset may refer to:

- Edward Arthur Somerset (1817–1886), Acting Governor of Gibraltar from 1875 to 1876
- Lord Charles Somerset (1767–1831), Governor of the Cape Colony, South Africa, from 1814 to 1826
