= English expedition to France (1562–1563) =

Part of the First French War of Religion

- Part of the First French War of Religion
Date	1562–1563
Location	Le Havre and Dieppe
Result	French victory: Treaty of Troyes

Belligerents
Kingdom of France	Kingdom of England: Huguenots of Le Havre and Dieppe (Before the Edict of Amboise)

Commanders and leaders
Charles IX of France; Catherine de' Medici; Anne de Montmorency	(Kingdom of England) Elizabeth I (Kingdom of England) Ambrose Dudley, 3rd Earl of Warwick

The English expedition to France 1562–1563 was an episode in the First French War of Religion, it resulted in a French victory and the Kingdom of England relinquish its claims to Calais and the surrounding area.

== Background ==
On 8 May 1562, Protestant reformers took the city of Le Havre, looted churches, and expelled Catholics. Fearing a counter-attack by the royal armies, they turned to the English who sent their troops.

Elizabeth I saw an opportunity in the current state of chaos in France to reclaim the Pale of Calais, which had only recently been lost in the Anglo-French War (1557–1559) after two centuries of English rule. On 22 September 1562, the Treaty of Hampton Court was signed by Elizabeth and Huguenot leader Louis, Prince of Condé, by which it was agreed that England would send 3,000 men to occupy the cities of Le Havre and Dieppe. On arrival the English built a series of fortifications.

== English failure ==
In 1563, peace was restored between the Huguenots and French Catholics with the Edict of Amboise. However, when the English were requested to leave the cities they were still occupying, Elizabeth refused, stating that English forces would hold out until France restored Calais to English rule. In response the French regent, Catherine de' Medici, sent a force of French Catholic and Huguenots under Anne de Montmorency. The French attacked the city of Le Havre and expelled the English on 29 July 1563. The fort the English had constructed was then razed.

John Oldmixon's History of England contains a list of notable Englishmen who died at Le Havre, either of plague or else killed by the enemy. Among those listed is Francis Somerset, a brother of William Somerset, 3rd Earl of Worcester, and Cuthbert Vaughan, Comptroller of the town. Details of the surrender and the names of some casualties were included in a contemporary printed newsletter circulated in England.

== Consequences ==
The English failure led to the Treaty of Troyes (1564); Elizabeth accepted French rule over Calais in exchange for 120,000 crowns. Elizabeth felt betrayed by the Huguenots, and would never trust them again. As a result, Elizabeth refused to send assistance in 1572, despite Huguenot pleas, as France was consumed by the St. Bartholomew's Day massacre.
