= 1871 Monmouthshire by-election =

UK Parliamentary by-election

The 1871 Monmouthshire by-election was held on 4 March 1871. The by-election was held due to the resignation of the incumbent Conservative MP, Poulett Somerset, and was won, by the unopposed Conservative candidate Lord Henry Somerset.

== Result ==
1871 Monmouthshire by-election
Party	Candidate	Votes	%	±%
Conservative	Lord Henry Somerset	Unopposed		
Registered electors				
Conservative hold				

== See also ==
- Lists of United Kingdom by-elections
