= General Somerset =

General Somerset may refer to:

- Edward Arthur Somerset (1817–1886), British Army lieutenant general
- FitzRoy Somerset, 1st Baron Raglan (1788–1855), British Army general
- Henry Somerset (British Army officer) (1794–1862), British Army lieutenant general
- Lord Robert Somerset (1776–1842), British Army general
