= Treaty of Hampton Court =

The Treaty of Hampton Court may refer to:

- The Treaty of Hampton Court (1526), between Henry VIII of England and Francis I of France
- The Treaty of Hampton Court (1562), between Elizabeth I of England and the Huguenot leader Louis I de Bourbon, prince de Condé
