= Thomas Morgan (of Dderw) =

Welsh Whig politician

Sir Thomas Morgan
- Born: 7 September 1664
- Died: 16 December 1700 (aged 36)

Sir Thomas Morgan, JP (7 September 1664 – 16 December 1700) was a Welsh Whig politician of the 17th century.

The eldest son of William Morgan and his first wife Blanche, Morgan inherited his father's estate upon the latter's death in 1680. He married Martha Mansel, by whom he had several children, all of whom predeceased him.

Morgan entered the House of Commons in 1689 as Member of Parliament for Brecon, and was High Sheriff of Monmouthshire the same year. In 1690, he sat as MP for Monmouthshire instead, and continued to be returned there for the rest of his life. He also unseated Jeffrey Jeffreys at Brecon in 1698, who appealed on petition. Before the matter could be resolved, Morgan died of smallpox in 1700. His estates, valued at £7000, went to his brother John Morgan.

Parliament of England
| Preceded by John Jeffreys | Member of Parliament for Brecon; 1689–1690 | Succeeded by Jeffrey Jeffreys |
| Preceded by Marquess of Worcester; Sir Trevor Williams, Bt | Member of Parliament for Monmouthshire; 1690–1700; With: Marquess of Worcester 1690–95; Sir Charles Kemeys, Bt 1695–98; Sir John Williams, Bt 1698–1700 | Succeeded by Sir John Williams, Bt; John Morgan |
| Preceded by Jeffrey Jeffreys | Member of Parliament for Brecon; 1698–1700 | Succeeded by Jeffrey Jeffreys |
Honorary titles
| Preceded by The Earl of Macclesfield | Custos Rotulorum of Monmouthshire; 1695–1700 | Succeeded by John Morgan |
