= 1874 Monmouthshire by-election =

UK Parliamentary by-election

The 1874 Monmouthshire by-election was fought on 17 March 1874. The by-election was fought due to the incumbent Conservative MP, Lord Henry Somerset, becoming Comptroller of the Household. It was retained, as expected, by the incumbent.

== Result ==
1874 Monmouthshire by-election
| Party | Candidate | Votes | % | ±% |
|---|---|---|---|---|
| Conservative | Henry Somerset | Unopposed | | |
| Registered electors | | 7,630 | | |
| Conservative hold | | | | |
