= Francis Somerset =

English nobleman (c. 1530–1563)

Francis Somerset (died 22 July 1563), was an English soldier, briefly a member of the House of Commons of England in the last Parliament of Queen Mary I (1558).

Somerset joined the English expedition to France and died of the Plague while taking part in the defence of Le Havre.

Probably born about 1534, Somerset was the fourth son of Henry Somerset, 2nd Earl of Worcester, and his second wife Elizabeth Browne, a daughter of Anthony Browne, Lieutenant of Calais. His mother was the leading witness against Anne Boleyn, and there were rumours that she had been a mistress of Henry VIII. He was descended in the male line from John of Gaunt.

Somerset was mistakenly reported to have died at the battle of Pinkie in 1547, but he was one of the two Members of Parliament for Monmouthshire in 1558 and fought at the siege of Leith in 1560.

During the French wars of religion, on 8 May 1562 Huguenot forces took the town of Le Havre and expelled Roman Catholics. Fearing a counter-attack by the royal armies, by the Treaty of Hampton Court the Huguenot leader Louis I, Prince of Condé, handed the town over to the English, who sent a garrison of some 6,000 men led by Ambrose Dudley, 3rd Earl of Warwick. The English built fortifications.

In 1563, the year of his death, Somerset was leader of a "band" of men. A warrant of Queen Elizabeth's authorized her Comptroller of the Household, Sir Edward Rogers, to send Sir Morice Denys, Treasurer of Newhaven, £300 (equivalent to £116,726 in 2025) to be paid to Somerset "for the wages of himself and his band, serving at Newhaven, due the 25th January last". John Stow's The Annales of England calls him Captain Francis Somerset.

In the summer of 1563 Charles IX sent a force, commanded by the Duke of Montmorency, which attacked Le Havre and expelled the English on 29 July 1563. Somerset was then at Le Havre and died there of Plague, a few days before the French had regained control of the town. He died unmarried, but in his Will proved in the Prerogative Court of Canterbury he refers to two illegitimate children, Charles and Elyanor, whom he consigned to the care of his mother.
