= Samuel Marsh =

Samuel Marsh may refer to:

- Samuel Marsh (footballer) (1879–1947), English footballer
- Samuel Marsh (railroad executive) (1786–1872), American businessman and president of the Erie Railroad
- Samuel Marsh (politician) (c. 1736–1795), London merchant and politician
