= John Morgan (of Rhiwpera) =

Welsh politician

- Born: 4 January 1671
- Died: 7 March 1720 (aged 49)
- Spouse: Martha Vaughan
- Children: William Morgan (of Tredegar, elder); Thomas Morgan (judge advocate); Martha Morgan

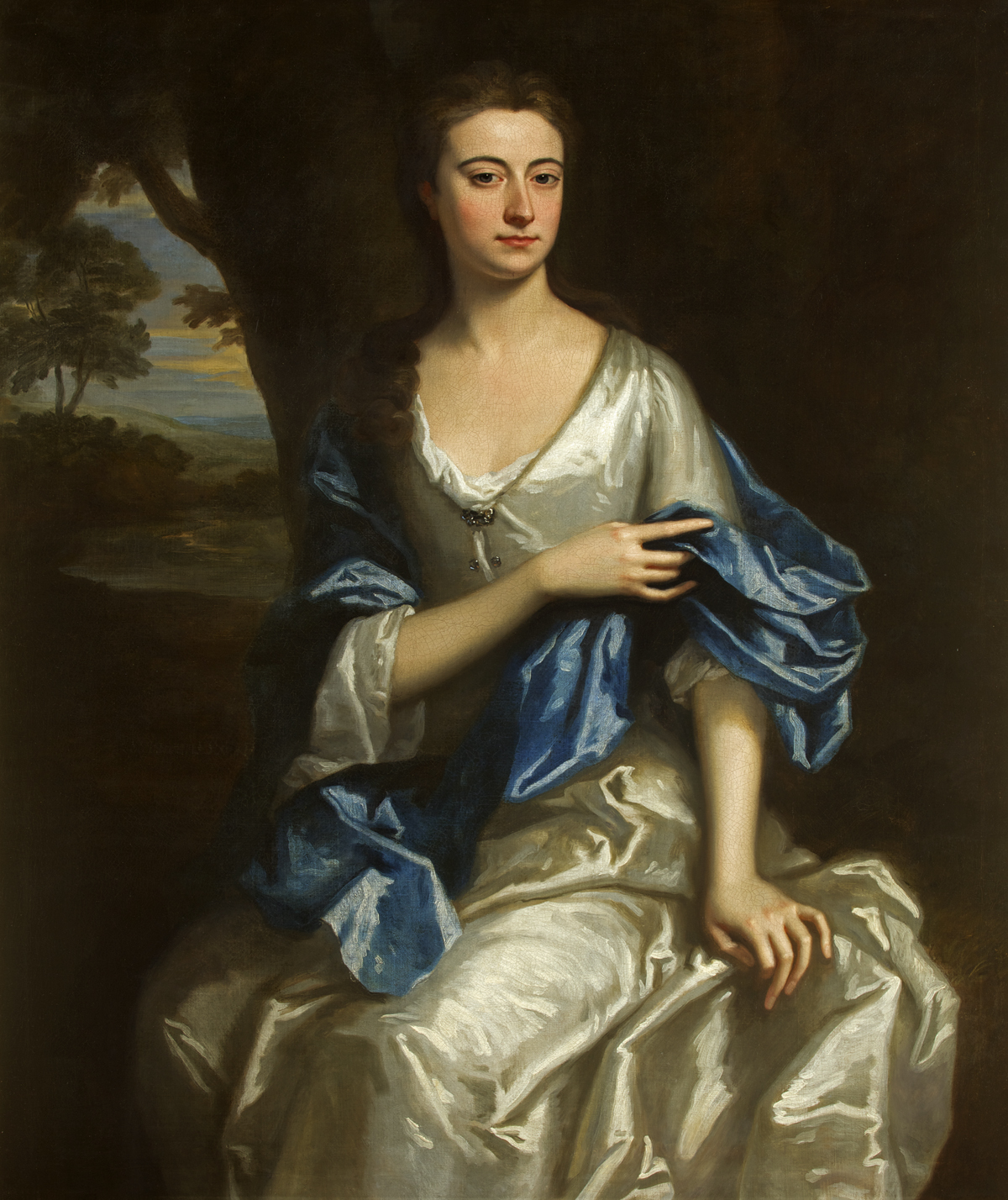
John Morgan had two sons by his wife, Martha Vaughan (pictured).

John Morgan (4 January 1671 – 7 March 1720) was a Welsh politician who sat in the House of Commons from 1701 to 1720.

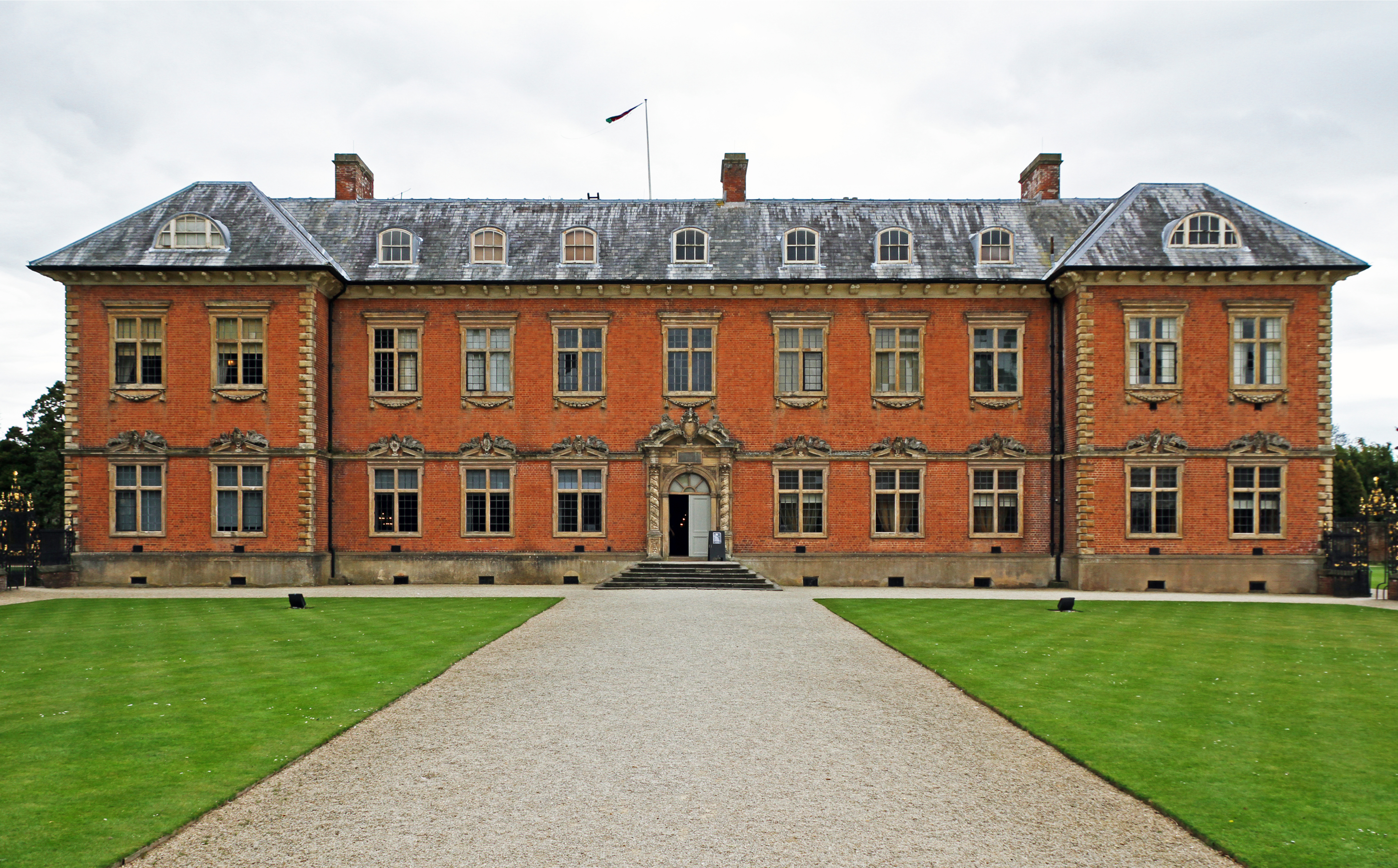
Tredegar House

Morgan was the youngest son of William Morgan and his wife (and cousin) Blanche. When his elder brother Sir Thomas Morgan died without surviving children in 1700, he inherited the family's Tredegar Estate, the two middle brothers having predeceased him.

Morgan, a prominent Whig, entered the House of Commons as Member of Parliament for Monmouthshire in 1701, replacing his brother, and represented it until his death in 1720. He was created custos rotulorum of the county the same year, in succession to his brother.

In 1715, Morgan inherited Rhiwperra Castle and the manor of Gwynllwg from his uncle, John Morgan and obtained the lord lieutenancy of the county and also of Brecknockshire.

By his wife Martha Vaughan, Morgan had two sons, Sir William Morgan, upon whom he settled the Tredegar estate, and Thomas Morgan, upon whom he settled Rhiwpera. He also had a daughter, Martha, who married the 3rd Earl of Oxford. He died in 1720, and was buried on 19 March 1720 at Machen.

Parliament of England
Preceded by Thomas Morgan; Sir John Williams, Bt	Member of Parliament for Monmouthshire; Jan 1701–1707; With: Sir John Williams, Bt 1701–14; Sir Hopton Williams, Bt 1705–07	Succeeded by Parliament of Great Britain
Parliament of Great Britain
Preceded by Parliament of England	Member of Parliament for Monmouthshire; 1707–1720; With: Sir Hopton Williams, Bt 1707–08; The Viscount Windsor 1708–12; James Gunter 1712–13; Thomas Lewis 1713; Sir Charles Kemeys, Bt 1713–15; Thomas Lewis 1715–20	Succeeded by Thomas Lewis; John Hanbury
Honorary titles
Preceded by Thomas Morgan	Custos Rotulorum of Monmouthshire; 1701–1720	Succeeded by William Morgan
Preceded by The Earl of Pembroke	Lord Lieutenant of Brecknockshire and Monmouthshire; 1715–1720	Succeeded by William Morgan
