= Edward Somerset =

Edward Somerset may refer to:

- Edward Somerset, 4th Earl of Worcester (bef. 1568–1628), English aristocrat, adviser to James I, serving as Lord Privy Seal
- Edward Somerset, 2nd Marquess of Worcester (1601?–1667), styled Lord Herbert of Raglan, English nobleman, son of Henry Somerset, 1st Marquess of Worcester
- Lord Edward Somerset (1776–1842), British soldier and politician, son of the 5th Duke of Beaufort
- Edward Arthur Somerset (1817–1886), British army general and politician, the son of Lord Edward Somerset
