= Thomas Somerset, 1st Viscount Somerset =

English politician

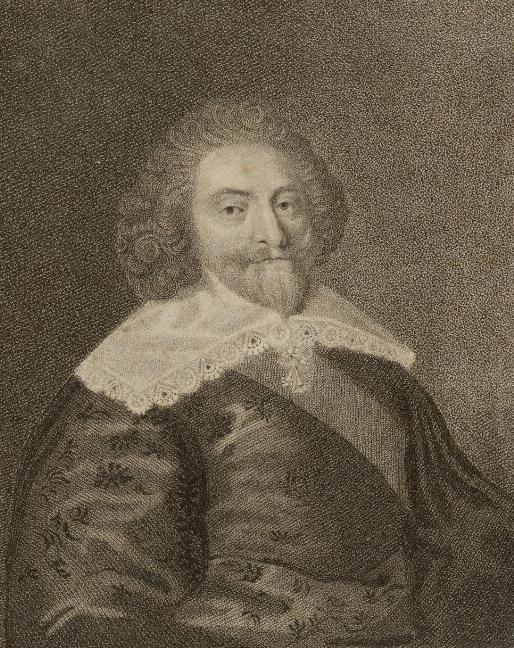
Portrait of Thomas Somerset, Viscount Somerset

Thomas Somerset, 1st Viscount Somerset (1579–1651) was an English courtier and politician.

== Career ==
Somerset was the third son of Edward Somerset, 4th Earl of Worcester.

In 1601, Somerset was elected Member of Parliament for Monmouthshire. He became a member of Gray's Inn on 7 August 1604. In 1604, he was re-elected MP for Monmouthshire and sat until 1611.

Somerset was sent to Scotland with Charles Percy by the Privy Council to notify James VI and I of the death of Elizabeth I. He was appointed Master of Horse to Anne of Denmark in 1603. His father was Master of Horse to King James. Somerset argued with a Scottish courtier William Murray of Abercairny about this role at York in June 1603.

On 1 January 1604, he danced at Hampton Court in The Masque of Indian and China Knights. In November 1604, Somerset fought with a Scottish aristocrat John Stewart, Master of Orkney in the Baloon or "balowne" Court at Whitehall Palace. Stewart was confined to his chamber but Somerset was sent to the Fleet Prison. Their argument followed on an incident when Somerset accompanied the Duke of Holstein and the Master of Orkney to the Queen's apartments, and as the gentlemen were at the door of her Privy Chamber, accused each other of pushing and shoving.

He was knighted as Knight of Bath on 5 January 1605. He performed in the masque Hymenaei at the marriage of the Earl of Essex and Frances Howard in January 1606. He took part in the tournament for Prince Henry, Prince Henry's Barriers in January 1610.

Somerset was involved in a riding accident while running at the ring at Whitehall Palace in May 1612. His horse trampled the governor of Henri, Duke of Thouars, a companion of the Duke of Boullion.

Somerset married Eleanor (or Helena) de Barry, daughter of David de Barry, 5th Viscount Buttevant, in 1616. She was the widow of Thomas Butler, 10th Earl of Ormond, who died in November 1614.

In December 1626, he was raised to the Peerage of Ireland as Viscount Somerset of Cashel.

Somerset died in 1651 and the title became extinct.

Parliament of England
Preceded by Henry Herbert; John Arnold	Member of Parliament for Monmouthshire; 1601–1611; With: Henry Morgan 1601; Sir John Herbert 1604–1611	Succeeded by Walter Montagu; William Jones
Peerage of Ireland
New creation	Viscount Somerset; 1626–1651	Extinct
