= Edmund Morgan (of Llandaff) =

English politician

Sir Edmund Morgan was a Welsh politician who sat in the House of Commons in 1601 and 1621.

Morgan was the second son of Henry Morgan of Llandaff and Penllwyn-Sarth. He was a captain in the army and was knighted probably at Dublin on 5 August 1599.

In 1601, Morgan was elected Member of Parliament for Wilton. He was High Sheriff of Monmouthshire in 1602. In 1621 he was elected MP for Monmouthshire.

Morgan married a daughter of Mr Francis in around 1600. He was the brother of Henry Morgan of Llandaff, also MP for Monmouthshire.

Parliament of England
Preceded by Thomas Muffet	Member of Parliament for Wilton; 1601	Succeeded by Sir Thomas Edmondes; Hugh Sandford
Preceded by Walter Montagu; William Jones	Member of Parliament for Monmouthshire; 1621; With: Charles Williams	Succeeded by Sir William Morgan
