= Custos Rotulorum of Monmouthshire =

Civic post in Monmoutshire, Wales

This is a list of people who have served as custos rotulorum of Monmouthshire.

- Richard Morgan bef. 1544–1556
- Thomas Somerset bef. 1558 – aft. 1562
- Rowland Morgan bef. 1564 – aft. 1577
- William Herbert bef. 1584–1593
- Henry Herbert, 2nd Earl of Pembroke bef. 1594–1601
- Edward Somerset, 4th Earl of Worcester 1601–1628
- William Herbert, 3rd Earl of Pembroke 1628–1630
- Philip Herbert, 4th Earl of Pembroke 1630 – aft. 1636
- Sir Nicholas Kemeys, 1st Baronet 1645–1646
- English Interregnum
- Henry Somerset, 1st Duke of Beaufort 1660–1689
- Charles Gerard, 1st Earl of Macclesfield 1689–1694
- Thomas Morgan 1695–1700
- John Morgan 1701–1720

For later custodes rotulorum, see Lord Lieutenant of Monmouthshire.
