= William Herbert (of Coldbrook) =

Welsh politician

William Herbert was a Welsh politician who sat in the House of Commons of England in 1626.

Herbert was the eldest son of William Herbert of Coldbrook and his wife Catherine Morgan, daughter of Thomas Morgan of Tredegar. He was the grandson of Matthew Herbert.

In 1626, Herbert was elected Member of Parliament for Monmouthshire. He was High Sheriff of Monmouthshire in 1638.

Herbert married Priscilla Pigot, daughter of Sir Edward Pigot of Laughton, Buckinghamshire, and later married Elizabeth Claypole, daughter of Sir John Claypole of Northamptonshire. His son Henry Herbert was also MP.

Herbert died in 1646.

Parliament of England
Preceded by Robert Viscount Lisle; Sir William Morgan	Member of Parliament for Monmouthshire; 1626; With: Nicholas Arnold	Succeeded by Nicholas Kemeys; Nicholas Arnold
