= John Herbert (died 1659) =

English politician

John Herbert (1625–1659) was an English politician who sat in the House of Commons at various times between 1646 and 1659.

Herbert was the son of Philip Herbert, 4th Earl of Pembroke, and his wife Susan de Vere, daughter of Edward de Vere, 17th Earl of Oxford. He matriculated at Jesus College, Oxford, on 15 June 1638, aged 13. In 1646, he was elected Member of Parliament for Monmouthshire as a recruiter for the Long Parliament. He was awarded MA at the University of Oxford on 12 April 1648. In December 1648 he was secluded from parliament under Pride's Purge. He was elected MP for Wilton in 1659 for the Third Protectorate Parliament.

Herbert died in 1659 at the age of about 34 and was buried in Westminster Abbey on 23 November 1659.

Parliament of England
Preceded by William Herbert	Member of Parliament for Monmouthshire; 1646	Succeeded by Not represented in Rump Parliament
Preceded by Not represented in Second Protectorate Parliament	Member of Parliament for Wilton; 1659; With: Richard Howe	Succeeded by Not represented in Restored Rump
