= William Jones (of Treowen) =

William Jones (died July 1640) was an English politician who sat in the House of Commons in 1614.

Jones was the son of John Jones of Treowen. In 1614, Jones was elected Member of Parliament for Monmouthshire. He was High Sheriff of Monmouthshire in 1615.

He was responsible for rebuilding the family house at Treowen where he lived in 1628.

Jones married Jane Gwillim (or Gwilym), daughter of Moore Gwillim of Monmouth.

Parliament of England
| Preceded by Thomas Somerset; Sir John Herbert | Member of Parliament for Monmouthshire; 1614; With: Walter Montagu | Succeeded by Sir Edmund Morgan; Charles Williams |
