= William Morgan (of Tredegar) =

Welsh politician

Sir William Morgan
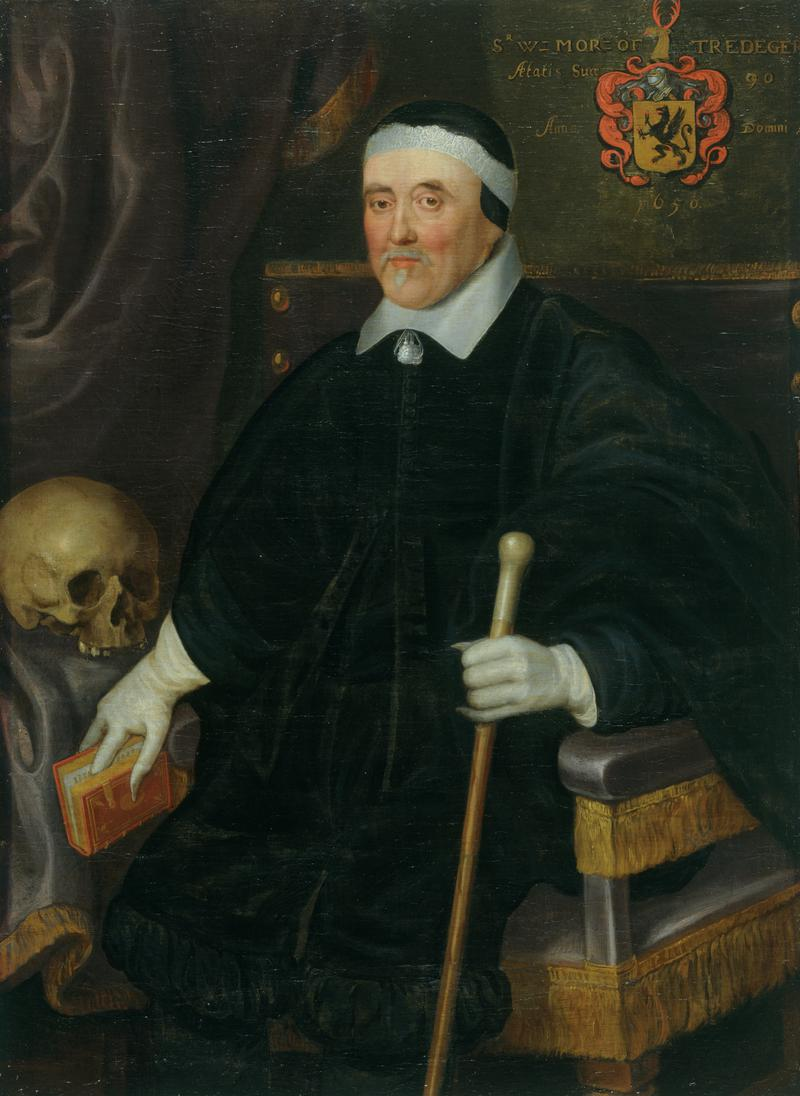
- Portrait held by Amgueddfa Cymru
- Born: 1560
- Died: 1655 (aged 94–95)
- Children: Thomas Morgan (of Machen); Anthony Morgan of Kilflgin

Sir William Morgan (1560–1655) was a Welsh politician who sat in the House of Commons of England in 1624 and 1625. He supported the Royalist cause in the English Civil War.

== Biography ==
Morgan was the eldest son of Thomas MorganThomas Morgan and wife Elizabeth Bodenham. He was knighted on 23 July 1603. In 1612, he was Sheriff of Monmouthshire. In 1624, Morgan was elected Member of Parliament for Monmouthshire. He was re-elected MP for Monmouthshire in 1625.

On the outbreak of Civil War, Morgan was Commissioner of Array for King and became Governor of Newport. He received King Charles at Tredegar on 16 and 17 July 1645. Information was laid against him before the Committee for Advance of Money on 13 November 1649 about his Royalist activities. He died in 1653.

== Family ==
Morgan married, firstly, Elizabeth Wynter, daughter of Adm. Sir William Wynter of Lydney, Gloucestershire. He married, secondly, Bridget Morgan, widow of Anthony Morgan of Llanfihangael Crucorney and daughter of Anthony Morgan of Heyford, Northamptonshire, and wife Mary Langton. They had several children:

- Thomas was later MP for Monmouthshire.
- Anthony was later a Royalist officer in the Civil War.
- John married Rebecca Smith. His daughter Frances was the first wife of Charles Williams of Llangiby.
- William Morgan (born Llandaff/Rumney, 1610)
- Elizabeth Morgan (1583-1638), married William Morgan of Dderw

== Notes ==
Parliament of England
Preceded by Sir Edmund Morgan; Charles Williams	Member of Parliament for Monmouthshire; 1624–1625; With: Robert Viscount Lisle	Succeeded by Nicholas Arnold; William Herbert
