= Thomas Morgan (MP died 1603) =

Member of the Parliament of England

- Born: 1534
- Died: 1603 (aged 68–69)
- Children: William Morgan (of Tredegar)

Thomas Morgan, MP, DL, JP (1534 - 1603) was a Welsh Member of the Parliament of England.

== Life ==
He was the eldest son of Sir Rowland Morgan of Plas Machen, Monmouthshire (1498-1577) and paternal grandson of Thomas Morgan (?-d. 1538) and wife Elsbeth Vaughan (1482-?), and was educated at the Middle Temple. He inherited Tredegar House from his cousin Miles Morgan, who had died at sea after inheriting it from William Morgan.

He was a Justice of the Peace for Monmouthshire from c. 1570 and appointed High Sheriff of Monmouthshire for 1580–81. He served a Deputy Lieutenant for the county from 1587 until his death. He was elected M.P. for Monmouthshire in 1588.

He married Elizabeth, the daughter of Roger Bodenham, with whom he had 9 sons and 13 daughters. He was succeeded by his son, Sir William Morgan of Tredegar.

== See also ==
- Sir Thomas Morgan (MP died 1565)
