= François de Beauvais, Seigneur de Briquemault =

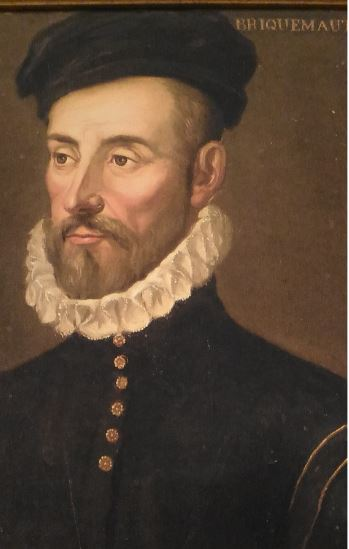

François de Beauvais, Seigneur de Briquemault (c. 1502–1572) was a leader of the Huguenots during the first religious wars.

He was the son of Adrien de Briquemault and Alexane de Sainte Ville.

His first campaign was under the count of Brissac in the Piedmontese wars. On his return to France in 1554 he joined Admiral Coligny. Charged with the defence of Rouen, in 1562, he resigned in favor of Gabriel Montgomery, to whom the Prince of Condé had entrusted the task, and went over to England, where he concluded the Treaty of Hampton Court on 20 September. He then returned to France, and took Dieppe from the Catholics before the conclusion of peace.

If his share in the second religious war was less important, he played a very active part in the third. He fought at Jarnac, Roche-Abeille and Montcontour, assisted in the siege of Poitiers, was nearly captured by the Catholics at Bourg-Dieu, re-victualled Vézelay, and almost surprised Bourges. In 1570, being charged by Coligny to stop the army of the princes in its ascent of the Rhône valley, he crossed Burgundy and effected his junction with the admiral at Saint-Étienne in May.

On the 21st of the following June he assisted in achieving the victory of Arnay-le-Duc, and was then employed to negotiate a marriage between the prince of Navarre and Elizabeth I of England. Being in Paris on the night of St. Bartholomew he took refuge in the house of the English ambassador, but was arrested there. With his friend Arnaud de Cavagnes he was delivered over to the parlement, and failed in courage when confronted with his judges, seeking to escape death by unworthy means. He was condemned, nevertheless, on 27 October 1572, to the last penalty and to the confiscation of his property, and on 29 October he and Cavagnes were executed.
