= Leveson Somerset =

Royal Navy Admiral (1829–1900)

Admiral Leveson Eliot Henry Somerset (29 August 1829 – 7 February 1900) was a British Royal Navy officer who served as second-in-command of the Channel Squadron 1880-1881.

== Biography ==
Somerset was born in 1829, the second son of Lord Granville Somerset (1792–1848), a member of parliament, by his wife Hon. Emily Smith (d. 1869), daughter of Robert Smith, 1st Baron Carrington. His father was the second son of the 6th Duke of Beaufort.

He entered the Royal Navy in 1843, obtaining his lieutenant's commission in 1851. As gunnery lieutenant of HMS Duke of Wellington he served in the war in the Baltic (following the outbreak of the Crimean War with Russia). He was part of the landing brigade at the capture of Bomarsund and employed in the battery that breached Fort Nottich in 1854. In the following year he was present at the bombardment of Sveaborg, when he commanded a rocket boat during the night attack, and for his services in the war received the Baltic medal. In 1856 he was promoted to commander of a Line of Battleship (then at Portsmouth), and in 1862 to captain. From September 1875 to February 1878 he was superintendent of the Dockyard in the Imperial fortress colony of Bermuda, and from November 1876 to February 1878 a naval aide de camp to Queen Victoria. Promoted to rear-admiral that year, he was second in command of the Channel Squadron from June 1880 to June 1881. In 1884 he was promoted to vice-admiral, in 1888 to admiral, and in 1891 he was placed on the retired list.

He was Justice of the peace for Middlesex and London.

Somerset died at his residence in Curzon Street, London, on 7 February 1900.

== Family ==
Somerset married, in 1872, Efah Rowley, daughter of Colonel the Hon. R. T. Rowley.
