= Anthony Morgan of Kilfigin =

Royalist officer

Sir Anthony Morgan (died 1665) of Kilfigin, Monmouthshire, was a Royalist officer during the English Civil War.

== Biography ==
Morgan was the son of Sir William Morgan of Tredegar, Monmouthshire, and Bridget, daughter and heiress of Anthony Morgan of Heyford, Northamptonshire. He seems identical with the Anthony Morgan who was appointed by the Spanish ambassador Cardenas on 9 June 1640 to levy and transport the residue of the two thousand soldiers afforded to him by King Charles I.

On 21 October 1642 Morgan was knighted by Charles at Southam, Warwickshire, and two days later fought at the Battle of Edgehill. By the death of his half-brother, Colonel Thomas Morgan, who was killed at the Battle of Newbury 20 September 1643, he became possessed of the manors of Heyford and Clasthorpe, Northamptonshire; he had other property in Monmouthshire, Warwickshire, and Westmoreland. He subsequently went abroad, but returned in 1648, when, though his estates were sequestered by the parliament by an ordinance dated 5 January 1646, he imprisoned several of his tenants in Banbury Castle for not paying their rent to him.

Morgan tried to compound for his property in May 1650, and took the covenant and negative oath, but being represented as a "papist delinquent", he was unable to make terms with the Committee for Compounding with Delinquents. In August 1658 he obtained leave to pay a visit to France.

One Anthony Morgan was ordered to be arrested and brought before Secretary Bennet on 5 June 1663, and his papers were seized (ib. 1663-4, p. 163). He died in St. Giles-in-the-Fields, London, in about June of 1665 (Probate Act Book, P. C. C., 1665), leaving by his wife Elizabeth (? Fromond) an only daughter, Mary. In his will (P. C. C., 64, Hyde) he describes himself as of Kilfigin, Monmouthshire.

The family tree for the Morgan Family of Heyford found on p199 of A history of the Church of St. Peter, Northampton, together with the Chapels of Kingsthorpe and Upton (by Serjeantson, R. M., found online at archive.org ) corroborates the family information. There is an error in the tree, however, as the Peter Fermor (c1637-16 Dec 1691) named in the tree states in his will that he married Mary the daughter of Sir Anthony Morgan (not his sister).
