= Sir John Williams, 2nd Baronet, of Llangibby =

Sir John Williams, 2nd Baronet (c. 1651 – November 1704) was a Welsh member of parliament, representing the constituencies of Monmouth Boroughs (February 1689 – 1690) and Monmouthshire (1698–1704).

He was one of the Williams baronets. He succeeded Sir Trevor Williams, 1st Baronet and was succeeded by Sir Hopton Williams, 3rd Baronet.

Parliament of England
Preceded by John Arnold	Member of Parliament for Monmouth Boroughs; 1689–1690	Succeeded by Sir Charles Kemeys
Preceded by Thomas Morgan; Sir Charles Kemeys	Member of Parliament for Monmouthshire; 1698–1704; With: Thomas Morgan 1698–1701; John Morgan 1701–1704	Succeeded by John Morgan; Sir Hopton Williams
Baronetage of England
Preceded by Trevor Williams	Baronet (of Llangibby); 1692–1704	Succeeded by Hopton Williams
