= Frederick Courtenay Morgan =

British politician (1834–1909)

Colonel The Honourable Frederic Courtenay Morgan
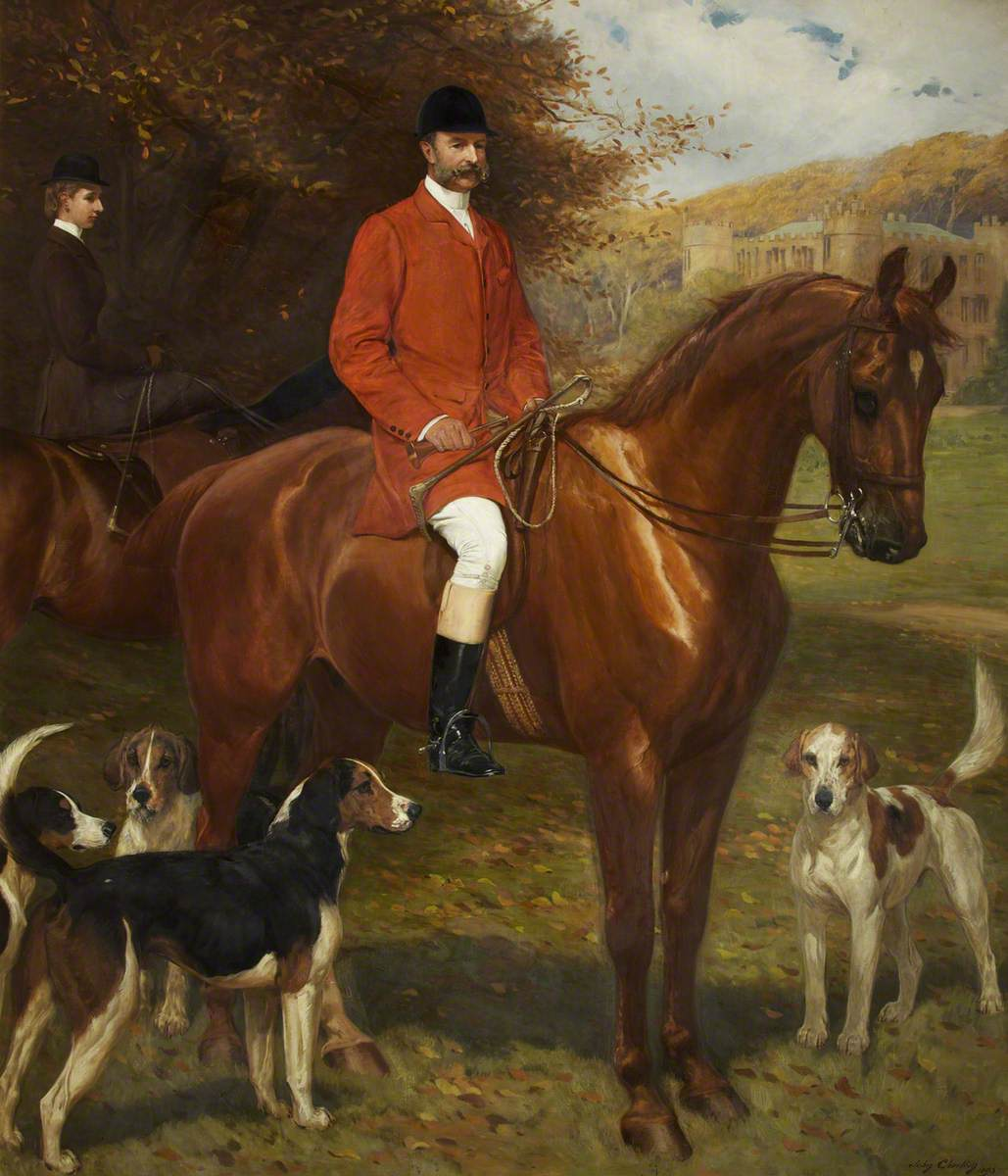
- Morgan in front of Ruperra Castle

Member of Parliament for South Monmouthshire
- In office 1885–1906
- Preceded by: New constituency
- Succeeded by: Ivor Treowen

Member of Parliament for Monmouthshire
- In office 1874–1880 Serving with Lord Henry Somerset, John Rolls
- Preceded by: Octavius Morgan; Lord Henry Somerset
- Succeeded by: Constituency divided

Personal details
- Born: 24 May 1834
- Died: 9 January 1909 (aged 74)
- Spouse: Charlotte Anne Williamson
- Children: Courtenay Morgan, 1st Viscount Tredegar, Frederic Morgan, 5th Baron Tredegar
- Parent: Charles Morgan, 1st Baron Tredegar (father)

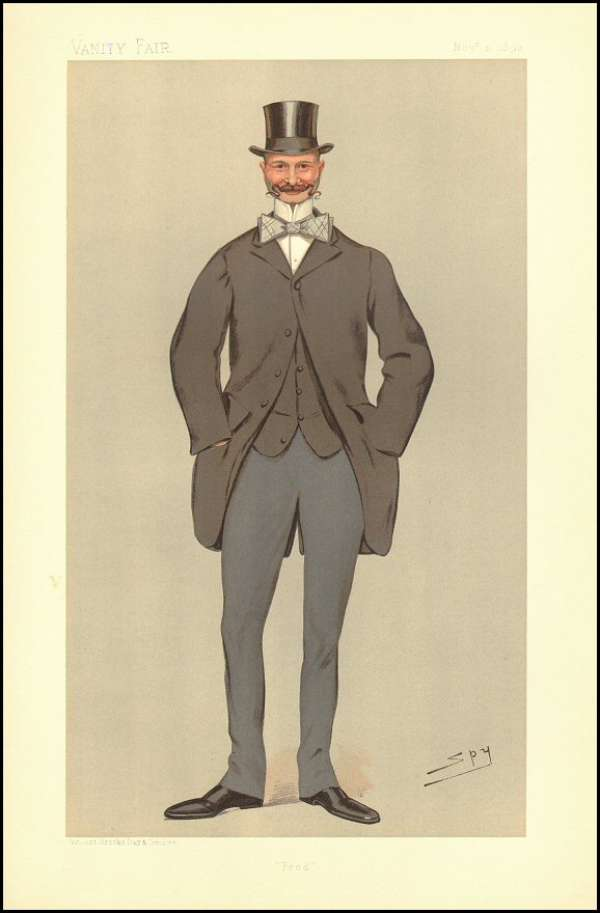
"Fred" Morgan as caricatured by Spy (Leslie Ward) in Vanity Fair, November 1893

Colonel Hon. Frederic Courtenay Morgan (24 May 1834 – 8 January 1909) was a Welsh Army officer and Conservative politician.

== Early life ==
Morgan was the son of Charles Morgan, 1st Baron Tredegar, 3rd Bt., by his wife Rosamund Mundy.

== Career ==
Morgan was commissioned into the Rifle Brigade in 1853 and fought in the Crimean War. He was promoted lieutenant in 1854 and captain in 1855. In 1860 he left the Regular Army and joined the 2nd Monmouthshire (1st Newport) Rifle Volunteers, becoming lieutenant-colonel commanding the 1st Administrative Battalion of the Monmouthshire Rifle Volunteers later the same year. He resigned his commission in 1873. He later commanded the 2nd Volunteer Battalion of the South Wales Borderers and was promoted colonel.

=== Political career ===
Morgan was elected Member of Parliament for Monmouthshire in the 1874 general election and held it until the reorganisation under the Redistribution of Seats Act 1885. In the 1885 general election, he was elected MP for South Monmouthshire. He was re-elected successively four more times in 1886, 1892, 1895, and 1900. His uncle Charles Octavius Swinnerton Morgan (1803–1888) had represented the old constituency of Monmouthshire from 1840 to 1874.

== Personal life ==
Morgan married Charlotte Anne Williamson, the daughter of Charles Alexander Williamson of Lawers, by whom he had two sons and two daughters; both of his sons (and their respective sons) eventually succeeded to the Tredegar barony with the elder son and his own son becoming viscounts (1926 recreation). Children:

- Blanche Frances Morgan (1859–1948), who married Charles Twysden Hoare in 1883.
- Violet Wilhelmina Morgan (1860–1943), who married Maj. Basil St. John Mundy, in 1894
- Courtenay Charles Evan Morgan, 1st Viscount Tredegar (1867–1934), who was re-created a viscount in 1926. The viscountcy became extinct once again on the death of his son in 1949.
- Frederic George Morgan, 5th Baron Tredegar (1873–1954); he was father of the 6th and final Baron Tredegar (1908–1962). The title is now extinct.

Morgan lived at Rhiwperra or Ruperra Castle, and died at the age of 74.

Parliament of the United Kingdom
Preceded by Octavius Morgan; Lord Henry Somerset	Member of Parliament for Monmouthshire; 1874 – 1885; With: Lord Henry Somerset to 1880; John Rolls from 1880	Constituency divided
New constituency	Member of Parliament for South Monmouthshire; 1885 – 1906	Succeeded by Ivor Treowen
