= Octavius Morgan =

British politician, historian and antiquary

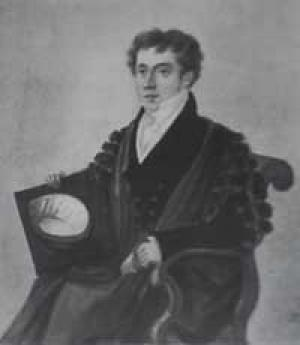

Member of Parliament for Monmouthshire
- In office 1841–1874
- Preceded by: William Addams Williams
- Succeeded by: Frederick Courtenay Morgan

Personal details
- Born: 15 September 1803 Newport
- Died: 5 August 1888 (aged 84)
- Party: Conservative
- Relatives: Charles Morgan, 1st Baron Tredegar, was his elder brother.
- Education: Westminster School, Christ Church, Oxford
- Occupation: Politician

Charles Octavius Swinnerton Morgan DL, JP, FRS, FSA (15 September 1803 – 5 August 1888), known as Octavius Morgan, was a British politician, historian and antiquary. In 1840, in his capacity as a JP he served on the Grand Jury at Monmouth which found John Frost and his fellow Chartists guilty of high treason. He was a significant benefactor to the British Museum, in which there is a collection that is named after him. Vincent and Leopold (2015:3) observed: 'The protoacademic approach of nineteenth-century collectors, such as Octavius Morgan (1803–1888) and Augustus Wollaston Franks (1826–1897), was instrumental to the establishment and growth of some of the most comprehensive collections of horology, chief among them found in the British Museum, London.'

== Early life and education ==
Morgan was born on 15 September 1803. He was the fourth son of Sir Charles Morgan, 2nd Baronet, of Tredegar Park, Monmouthshire, by his wife Mary (née Stoney). Charles Morgan, 1st Baron Tredegar was his older brother. His nephews included Charles Rodney Morgan, Godfrey Morgan, 1st Viscount Tredegar and Col. Hon. Frederick Courtenay Morgan. He was educated at Westminster School in London and at Christ Church, Oxford, gaining an M.A. in 1832.

== The Friars, Newport ==
Morgan inherited an ample fortune. Consequently, in 1839 he was able to buy "The Friars", a Grade II listed building in Newport, Wales which he had rebuilt in the Elizabethan style. He had an octagonal preaching platform installed halfway up the main wooden staircase where he would conduct services every day. And he was said to have filled the house with "Tudor furniture, more curious than useful". His congregation would consist of his maids, the housekeeper, bailiff and the boot boy. The lock he had installed on the door reflected his interest in mechanisms and automata. The substantial brass lock is still on the door of his house and it has seven subsidiary controls.

== Public life ==
Morgan sat as Member of Parliament for Monmouthshire from 1841 to 1874 for the Conservatives. He also served as a Justice of the Peace and Deputy Lieutenant for Monmouthshire.

Morgan belonged to multiple scholarly organizations. He was:

- a Fellow of the Society of Antiquaries of London, in which he was vice-president on more than one occasion
- a Fellow of the Royal Society
- a president of three organizations: the Royal Archaeological Institute, the Cambrian Archaeological Association and the Monmouthshire and Caerleon Antiquarian Association.

== Scholarship ==
Morgan had published research papers on multiple subjects including astrolabes, clocks, episcopal rings, early communion plate, local history, watches and watchmaking.

In 1852 Morgan had published a series of papers in the Archaeological Journal about the assay and hallmarking of gold and silver, the first information that had been made public on this ancient practice. These sparked public interest in studying and collecting old gold and silver because of the information about its date and origins that can be discovered from the hallmarks.

Three later publications were:

- 1872 - his book 'Some Account of the Ancient Monuments in the Priory Church, Abergavenny', a valuable guide to the monuments in the Priory Church of St Mary in Abergavenny
- 1882 - his account of the discovery of an ancient Danish vessel at the mouth of the River Usk during the construction of the Alexandra Dock, Newport commissioned by his elder brother Charles Morgan, 1st Baron Tredegar
- 1886 - his etymology of 'Tredegar', the name of his ancestral home, which had been published elsewhere five years previously

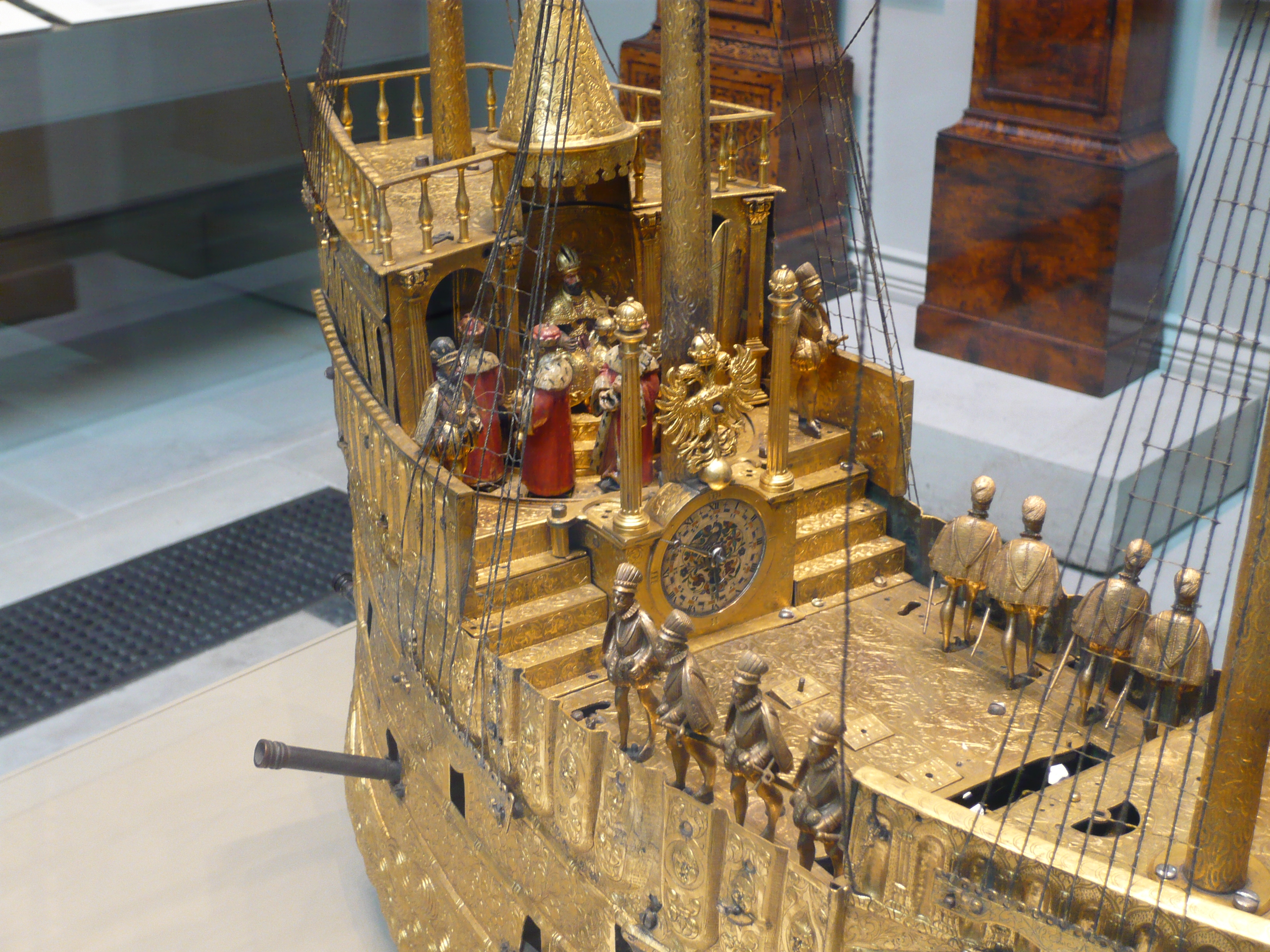
The Mechanical Galleon that Morgan gave to the British Museum.

== Later life and death ==
During his lifetime Morgan made a number of generous donations to the British Museum including a nef, an extravagant table ornament automaton known as the Mechanical Galleon in 1866.

Morgan never married and died on 5 August 1888 aged 84. He was buried in his family's vault at the Church of St Basil, Bassaleg in Newport. He left his clock collection, astronomical instruments and episcopal rings to the British Museum. His astrolabes included the 14th-century astrolabe used to call the faithful to prayer in Damascus. His collections of papers including his translations of Welsh poetry are in the National Library of Wales in Aberystwyth.

A book published at the time and attributed to his fellow MP, Reginald Blewitt, described Morgan as flippant in his youth and overbearing, arrogant, short and effeminate. In contrast, in 1889, John Evans (archaeologist), the president of the Society of Antiquaries of London, described him as 'a delightful companion, full of information on his favourite subjects, and willing to impart it ...' (Society of Antiquaries, Anniversary, Tuesday, April 30, 1889 ).

Today his house's extensive dairy and orangery are gone because his home is currently (2024) a post-graduate education centre for the Royal Gwent Hospital Hospital of the Aneurin Bevan University Hospital of NHS Wales. However, it is said that the house is still adorned with Latin inscriptions hidden within wooden carvings and a grand imported German fireplace bearing his initials.

== Publications ==
=== Articles ===
- Morgan, Octavius (1849). "V.—Observations on the history and progress of the art of Watchmaking, from the earliest period to modern times: in a letter from Octavius Morgan, Esq., MP, FSA, to Sir Henry Ellis, KH, Secretary". Archaeologia. 33 (1): 84–100. doi:10.1017/S0261340900000060.
- —— (1850). "XXIII.—Continuation of the history and progress of the art of watchmaking. In a second letter from Octavius Morgan, Esq., MP, FSA to Sir Henry Ellis, KH Secretary". Archaeologia. 33 (2): 293–307. doi:10.1017/S0261340900002757.
- —— (1852). "On the assay marks on gold and silver plate". Archaeological Journal. 9 (1): 231–246. doi:10.1080/00665983.1852.10850858.
- —— (1852). "XXII.—Supplementary observations on an astronomical and astrological table-clock, together with an account of the astrolabe. By C. Octavius Morgan, Esq., MP, MA, FRS and SA, in a letter to JY Akerman, Esq. Resident Secretary Archaeologia 34.2 (1852): 259-264". Archaeologia. 34 (2): 259–264. doi:10.1017/S0261340900001107.
- —— (1853). "Table of the Annual Assay Office letters: Used in the marking plate from the earliest period of their use to the present time, together with a reference to the various pieces of ancient plate which have been adopted as authorities for the same". Archaeological Journal. 10 (1): 33–38. doi:10.1080/00665983.1853.10850890.
- —— (1855). "XXXIV. On episcopal and other rings of investiture". Archaeologia. 36 (2): 392–399. doi:10.1017/S0261340900001703.
- —— (1855). "XXXVI. Excavations prosecuted by the Caerleon Archæological Association within the walls of Caerwent in the Summer of 1855". Archaeologia. 36 (2): 418–437. doi:10.1017/S0261340900001727.
- —— (1870). "XX.—On a chalice and paten belonging to the Parish Church of Nettlecombe, in the county of Somerset, with remarks on early English chalices". Archaeologia. 42 (2): 405–416. doi:10.1017/S0261340900003295.
- —— (1881). "Tredegar". Notes and Queries. 6 (96): 350–351.
- —— (1882). "Account of the discovery of an ancient Danish vessel in the alluvial deposit near the mouth of the river Usk". Proceedings at Meetings of the Royal Archaeological Institute. 35 (June 7): 403–405.
- —— (1886). "Origin of the name Tredegar". Archaeologia Cambrensis. 3 (10): 102–105.
- Morgan, Octavius S. (1875). "Observations on the classification and arrangement of a collection of watches". Archaeological Journal. 32 (1): 188–204. doi:10.1080/00665983.1875.10851678.
- Morgan, Octavius; Milman, Henry Salusbury (1885). "On the early charters of the Borough of Newport in Wentloog" (PDF). Archaeologia. 48 (2): 431–445. doi:10.1017/S0261340900000989.

=== Books ===
- Morgan, Octavius (1856). Excavations prosecuted by the Caerleon Archaeological Association within the walls of Caerwent in the Summer of 1855. London: JB Nichols and Sons.
- Morgan, Octavius; Wakeman, Thomas (1867). Notes on Penhow Castle. Newport: Monmouthshire and Caerleon Antiquarian Association.
- Morgan, Octavius (1872). Some account of the ancient monuments in the Priory Church, Abergavenny (PDF). Newport: Monmouthshire and Caerleon Antiquarian Association.

Parliament of the United Kingdom
Preceded by Lord Granville Somerset; William Addams Williams	Member of Parliament for Monmouthshire; 1841–1874; With: Lord Granville Somerset 1841–1848; Edward Arthur Somerset 1848–1859; Poulett Somerset 1859–1871; Lord Henry Somerset 1871–1874	Succeeded by Lord Henry Somerset; Frederick Courtenay Morgan
