= Walter Montagu (MP) =

- Died: 1615
- Burial place: Llanmartin
- Occupation: politician
- Known for: member, House of Commons
- Spouse: Ann Morgan
- Father: Sir Edward Montagu of Boughton

Walter Montagu (died 1615) was an English politician who sat in the House of Commons in 1614.

Montagu was the second son of Sir Edward Montagu of Boughton. He was knighted on 11 May 1603. He became High Sheriff of Monmouthshire in 1608. In 1614, he was elected Member of Parliament for Monmouthshire in the Addled Parliament.

Montagu died in 1615 and was buried at Llanmartin.

Montagu married Ann Morgan daughter of Henry Morgan of Pencoyd.

Parliament of England
Preceded by Thomas Somerset; Sir John Herbert	Member of Parliament for Monmouthshire; 1614; With: William Jones	Succeeded by Sir Edmund Morgan; Charles Williams
