= Thomas Morgan (MP died 1565) =

English politician

Sir Thomas Morgan
- Died: 5 June 1565

Sir Thomas Morgan (died 5 June 1565) was an English Member of Parliament. He was the eldest son of Sir William Morgan of Pencoed, Monmouthshire.

He was a Gentleman pensioner from 1540 to 1544 and a justice of the peace for Monmouthshire from 1543 until his death. He served in the French wars in 1544 and was knighted at the siege of Boulogne. He was elected M.P. for Monmouthshire on his return in 1546 and was appointed High Sheriff of Monmouthshire for 1547–48 and 1558–59.

He married Cecily, the daughter of Sir George Herbert of Swansea, Glamorgan; they had 5 sons and a daughter. His son, Sir William was an M.P. for Monmouth Boroughs.

== See also ==
- Sir Thomas Morgan (MP died 1603)
