= John Herbert (secretary of state) =

Welsh lawyer, diplomat and politician

Sir John Herbert
- Born: 1550
- Died: 9 July 1617 (aged 66–67); Cardiff
- Occupations: Lawyer, diplomat, politician

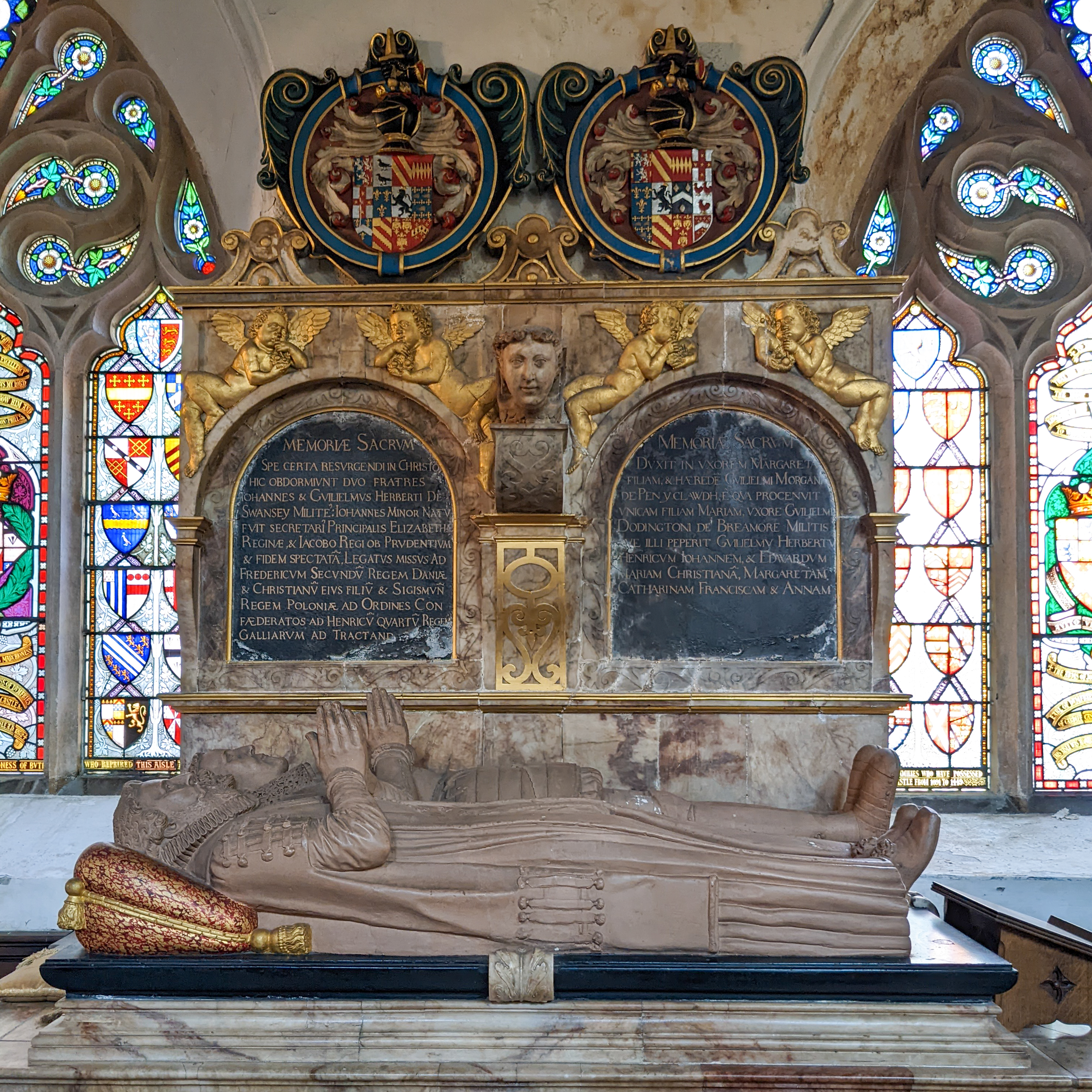
Tomb of John Herbert and his brother William in St John the Baptist Church, Cardiff

Sir John Herbert (1550 – 9 July 1617) was a Welsh lawyer, diplomat and politician who sat in the House of Commons at various times between 1586 and 1611. He was Secretary of State under Elizabeth I and James I.

== Life ==
Herbert was the son of Matthew Herbert of Swansea and was descended from an illegitimate son of William Herbert, Earl of Pembroke. Herbert may have been educated at Christ Church, Oxford, although this is questioned. He was admitted an honorary member of the College of Doctors of Law in November 1573 and awarded an MA. He was a commissioner of the High Court of Admiralty from 1575 to 1584 (with David Lewis) and Master of Requests from 1586 to 1601 (with William Aubrey from 1590). Queen Elizabeth appointed him secretary to the Council of the North and Keeper of the Signet.

In 1586, Herbert was elected Member of Parliament (MP) for Grampound. He was awarded the degree of Doctor of Civil Law by the University of Oxford in 1587. In 1588, he was elected MP for Gatton. He was elected MP for Christchurch in 1593 and MP for Bodmin in 1597. In April 1600, he was appointed second Secretary of State and a member of the Privy Council. In 1601 he was elected MP for Glamorgan and for Wallingford and chose to sit for Glamorgan. Besides serving in Parliament, he also was appointed as Dean of Wells in 1590, and served until late 1602. He was knighted in 1602. In 1604 he was elected MP for Monmouthshire and sat until 1611. He was appointed High Sheriff of Glamorgan for 1605 and in 1607 Chancellor of the Order of the Garter for life.

Herbert was a talented linguist (not just speaking English and Welsh) and so was used to interrogate foreign prisoners and on trade and political missions to Denmark, Poland, Brandenburg, the Netherlands and France. He continued in office under James I, although James preferred to use unofficial secretaries such as Philip Herbert, 4th Earl of Pembroke. When Robert Cecil, 1st Earl of Salisbury died in 1612, Herbert hoped to succeed him as principal secretary of state, but James I left the office vacant until 1614. He was thereafter Secretary of State in name only.

Herbert was of Neath Abbey. He died in Cardiff aged 67 on 9 July 1617, having fought a duel with Sir Lewis Tresham two months earlier. He is buried in St John the Baptist Church, Cardiff.

Herbert married Margaret Morgan, daughter of William Morgan of Cefn Coch.

== French embassy of 1598 ==
Herbert, Sir Robert Cecil, and Thomas Wilkes were chosen as ambassadors to France in January 1598 to discuss peace with France and Spain. Wilkes died soon after arrival at Rouen. Cecil and Herbert lodged at a house of the Duke of Montpensier in Paris, and subsequently travelled south to meet Henry IV of France at Angers in March. They had their final audiences with the king at Nantes and the Duke de Bouillon gave Cecil a locket with the king's portrait. They sailed home to Portsmouth from Ouistreham, a port near Caen, in the Adventure commanded by Sir Alexander Clifford.

Parliament of England
Preceded by Sir Thomas Mansell	Member of Parliament for Glamorgan; 1601	Succeeded by Philip Herbert
Preceded by Henry Morgan; Thomas Somerset	Member of Parliament for Monmouthshire; 1604–1611; With: Thomas Somerset	Succeeded by Walter Montagu; William Jones
Political offices
Preceded by Sir Robert Cecil	Secretary of State; 1600–1616; With: Sir Robert Cecil 1600–1612; Robert Carr, Viscount Rochester 1612–1614; Sir Ralph Winwood 1614–1616	Succeeded by Sir Ralph Winwood; Sir Thomas Lake
Preceded by The 2nd Earl of Pembroke	Custos Rotulorum of Glamorgan; 1601–1603	Succeeded by The 3rd Earl of Pembroke
