= John Jeffreys (died 1715) =

English politician

John Jeffreys (c. 1659 – 2 October 1715), of St. Mary Axe, London and Sheen, Surrey, was a Welsh politician.

He was a member (MP) for Radnorshire in the period 29 November 1692 – 1698 and for Marlborough in February 1701 – 1702 and 1705–1708, and for Breconshire in 1702–1705.

He was the fourth son of Watkin Jeffreys and the brother of Jeffrey Jeffreys. His marriage to Elizabeth, the daughter of Anthony Sturt was licensed on 16 April 1689 and they had one son.
