= Nicholas Arnold (MP for Monmouthshire) =

Nicholas Arnold (c. 1600 – 1665) was a Welsh gentleman landowner who sat in the House of Commons between 1626 and 1629.

Arnold was the son of John Arnold of Llanthony. He matriculated at St Alban Hall, Oxford, on 29 November 1616 aged sixteen.

In 1626, Arnold was elected Member of Parliament for Monmouthshire. He was re-elected as member for Monmouthshire in 1628 and held his seat until 1629, when King Charles decided to rule without parliament for eleven years. He was High Sheriff of Monmouthshire in 1633.

Arnold married Margaret Evan, daughter of John Evan of Dorset.

Parliament of England
Preceded by Viscount Lisle; Sir William Morgan	Member of Parliament for Monmouthshire; 1626–1629; With: William Herbert 1626; Nicholas Kemeys 1628–1629	Parliament suspended until 1640
Honorary titles
Preceded by Nicholas Kemeys	High Sheriff of Monmouthshire; 1633	Succeeded by Lewis Van
