= Lord Granville Somerset =

British Tory politician

The Right Honourable Lord Granville Somerset PC
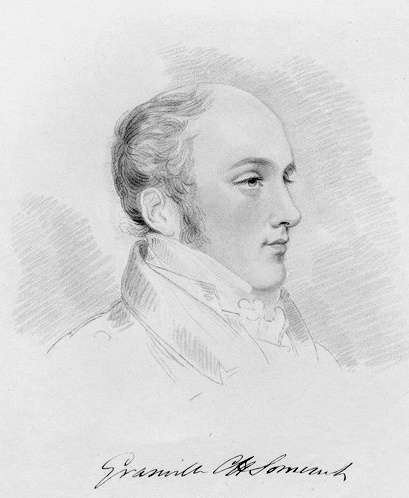

First Commissioner of Woods and Forests
- In office 23 December 1834 – 8 April 1835
- Monarch: William IV
- Prime Minister: Sir Robert Peel, Bt
- Preceded by: Sir John Hobhouse, Bt
- Succeeded by: Viscount Duncannon

Chancellor of the Duchy of Lancaster
- In office 3 September 1841 – June 1846
- Monarch: Victoria
- Prime Minister: Sir Robert Peel, Bt
- Preceded by: Sir George Grey, Bt
- Succeeded by: The Lord Campbell

Personal details
- Born: 27 December 1792
- Died: 23 February 1848 (aged 55)
- Party: Tory
- Spouse: Hon. Emily Smith (d. 1869)
- Children: 5, including Leveson
- Parent(s): Henry Somerset, 6th Duke of Beaufort; Charlotte Sophia Leveson-Gower
- Education: Christ Church, Oxford

Lord Granville Charles Henry Somerset PC (27 December 1792 – 23 February 1848) was a British Tory politician. He held office under Sir Robert Peel as First Commissioner of Woods and Forests between 1834 and 1835 and as Chancellor of the Duchy of Lancaster between 1841 and 1846.

== Background and education ==
Somerset was the second son of Henry Somerset, 6th Duke of Beaufort, and Lady Charlotte Sophia, daughter of Granville Leveson-Gower, 1st Marquess of Stafford. Henry Somerset, 7th Duke of Beaufort, was his elder brother. He was educated at Christ Church, Oxford (2nd class classics 1813).

== Political career ==
Somerset sat as member of parliament for Monmouthshire from 20 May 1816 until his death. He was a Lord of the Treasury under Lord Liverpool in 1820, and served under Sir Robert Peel First Commissioner of Woods and Forests from December 1834 to April 1835, and as Chancellor of the Duchy of Lancaster from September 1841 to July 1846 (with a seat in the cabinet from May 1844). In 1834 he was sworn of the Privy Council.

In private life he was a member of the Carlton Club.

== Family ==
Somerset married the Hon. Emily Smith, daughter of Robert Smith, 1st Baron Carrington, in 1822. They had five children:

- Granville Robert Henry Somerset (7 January 1824 – 3 March 1881), married Emma Philadelphia, daughter of Sir George Dashwood, 4th Baronet, without issue
- Emily Katherine Anne Somerset (29 January 1826 – 15 June 1908), married Col. Henry Ayshford Sanford on 10 May 1859, without issue
- Constance Henrietta Sophia Louisa (c.1827 – 1 September 1893), married Rowland Smith on 20 August 1857 and had issue
- Adm. Leveson Eliot Henry Somerset (29 August 1829 – 7 February 1900), married Efah, daughter of Col. Hon. Richard Thomas Rowley, without issue
- Raglan George Henry Somerset (17 December 1831 – 2 September 1924)

He died in February 1848, aged 55, and is buried at Kensal Green Cemetery, London. Lady Granville Somerset died in January 1869.

Parliament of the United Kingdom
Preceded by Lord Arthur Somerset; Sir Charles Morgan, Bt	Member of Parliament for Monmouthshire; 1816–48; With: Sir Charles Morgan, Bt 1816–31; William Addams Williams 1831–41; Octavius Morgan 1841–48	Succeeded by Edward Arthur Somerset; Octavius Morgan
Political offices
Preceded by Sir John Hobhouse, Bt	First Commissioner of Woods and Forests; 1834–1835	Succeeded by Viscount Duncannon
Preceded by Sir George Grey, Bt	Chancellor of the Duchy of Lancaster; 1841–1846	Succeeded by The Lord Campbell
