= William Morgan (of Rhymny) =

Welsh politician

William Morgan was a Welsh politician who sat in the House of Commons in 1640.

== Family ==
Morgan is the fourth child of Sir William Morgan of Tredegar, MP for Monmouthshire in 1624. Morgan is the third child of Sir William Morgan's second wife Bridget Morgan widow of Anthony Morgan of Llanfihangael Crucorney and daughter of Anthony Morgan of Heyford Northamptonshire.

== Education ==
He studied at the Middle Temple.

== Political career ==
In April 1640, he was elected MP for Monmouthshire in the Short Parliament.

Parliament of England
Vacant Parliament suspended since 1629	Member of Parliament for Monmouthshire; 1640; With: Walter Rumsey	Succeeded by Sir Charles Williams; William Herbert
