= Walter Rumsey =

Welsh judge and politician

Walter Rumsey (1584–1660) was a Welsh judge and politician who sat in the House of Commons in 1640. He suffered for his support of the Royalist cause in the English Civil War. He was also a man of arts and sciences, and developed plantsmanship, devised a medical apparatus and carried out scientific experiments on coffee and tobacco.

== Early life ==
Rumsey was born at Llanover, in Monmouthshire, the son of Walter Rumsey of Usk. He was admitted to Gloucester Hall, Oxford, at the age of 16, where he studied under Francis Bacon and William Harvey. He then went to Gray's Inn, where he was made Barrister, Puncher, and Lent Reader. In 1635 he was appointed Puisne Judge in the Brecon Circuit, and in 1637 he became Chief Justice. He was so eminent in his profession that he was called "the picklock of the Law."

== Career ==
In April 1640, Rumsey was elected Member of Parliament for Monmouthshire in the Short Parliament. He refused to serve in the Long Parliament and in 1645 was removed by parliament from his position as second justice on the Brecknock circuit.

In addition to the law, Rumsey was interested in philosophy, science and music. Anthony Wood described him as a good musician who played the organ and lute and was a composer. Of his plantsmanship Wood wrote "He was an ingeniose man, and had a philosophicall head; he was most curious for grafting, inoculating, and planting, and ponds. If he had any old dead plumbe-tree, or apple-tree, he lett them stand, and planted vines at the bottome, and lett them climbe up, and they would beare very well."

== Inventions ==
Rumsey invented the probang, a medical instrument made of whalebone, to cleanse the throat and stomach which was described in his work called Organon Salutis: an instrument to cleanse the stomach in 1657. Wood wrote "He was much troubled with flegme, and being so one winter at the court at Ludlowe (where he was one of the counsellours), sitting by the fire, spitting and spewling, he tooke a fine tender sprig, and tied a ragge at the end, and conceived he might putt it downe his throate, and fetch up the flegme, and he did so. Afterwards he made this instrument of whale-bone. I have oftentimes seen him use it. I could never make it goe downe my throate, but for those that can 'tis a most incomparable engine. If troubled with the wind it cures you immediately. It makes you vomit without any paine, and besides, the vomits of apothecaries have aliquid vetietii in them." Rumsey was interested in the medical uses of coffee and in his Electuary of Cophy, which appeared in 1657 he gave a prescription for "a new and superior way of preparing coffee" as an Electuray to take when using the provang.

"Take equal quantity of Butter and Sallet-oyle, melt them well together, but not boyle them: Then stirre them well that they may incorporate together: Then melt therewith three times as much Honey, and stirre it well together: Then add thereunto powder of Turkish Cophie, to make it a thick Electuary".

He also devised a concoction called "wash-brew" which included oatmeal, powder of "cophie", a pint of ale or any wine, ginger, honey, or sugar to please the taste, to which could be added butter and any cordial powder or pleasant spice. The mixture was to be kept in a flannel bag for use when required. This said to be a popular medicine among the Welsh people. Rumsey wrote another work, Divers new experiments of the virtue of Tobacco and Coffee to which Sir Henry Blount and James Howell wrote commendatory Epistles. In a chapter entitled "Experiments of Cophee" he noted that coffee had the power to cure drunkards.

== Marriage and later life ==
Rumsey married Barbara Pritchard, daughter of Martha Pritchard Llanover. On the Restoration, Rumsey was proposed for the intended order of Knights of the Royal Oak. He died in 1660 at the age of 76.

Parliament of England
| Vacant Parliament suspended since 1629 | Member of Parliament for Monmouthshire; 1640; With: William Morgan | Succeeded by Sir Charles Williams; William Herbert |
