= Poulett Somerset =

British politician

Colonel Poulett Somerset CB
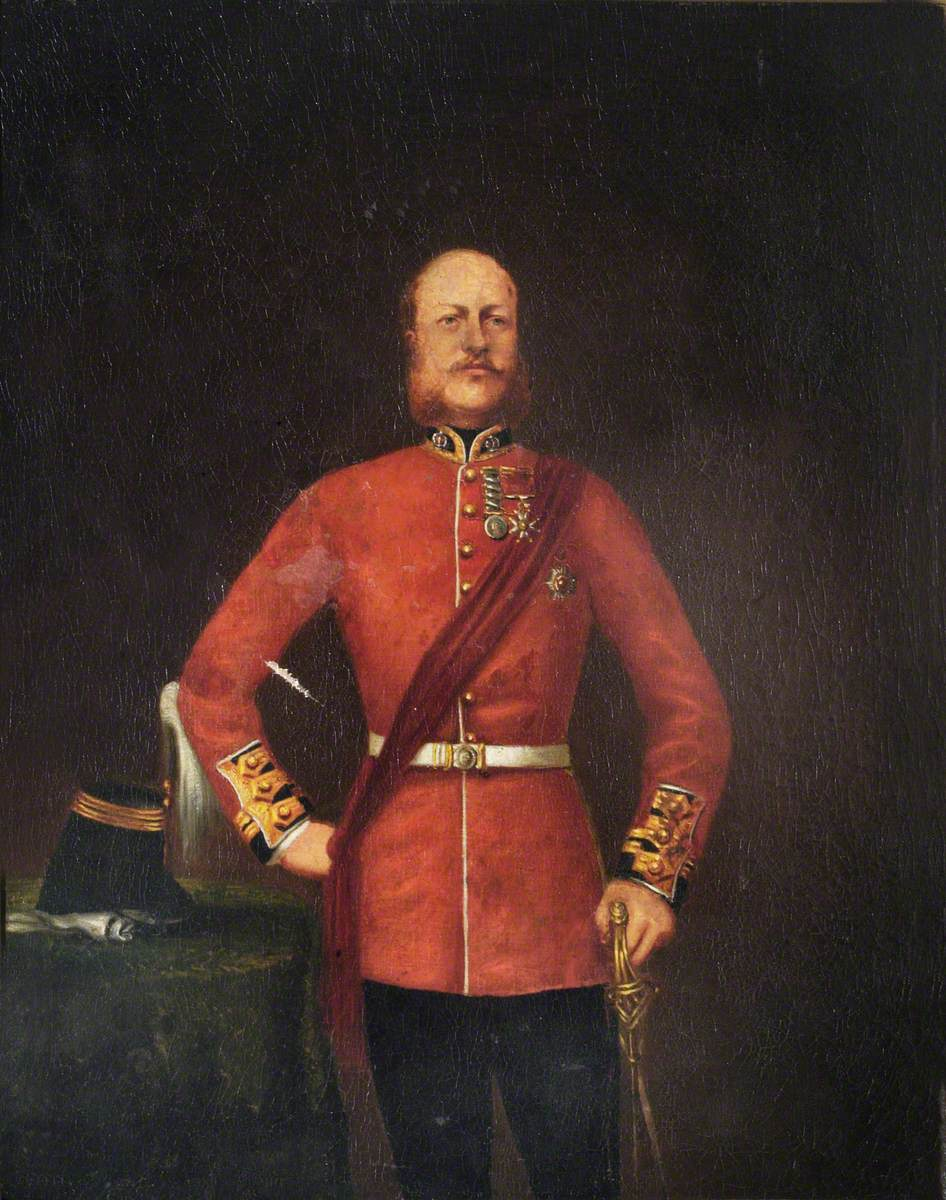
- Portrait of Somerset, unknown artist

Member of Parliament for Monmouthshire
- In office 1859–1871 Serving with Octavius Morgan
- Preceded by: Octavius Morgan; Edward Arthur Somerset
- Succeeded by: Octavius Morgan; Lord Henry Somerset

Personal details
- Born: Poulett George Henry Somerset; 19 June 1822
- Died: 7 September 1875 (aged 53)
- Spouse(s): Barbara Augusta Norah Mytton (m. 1847; died 1870) Emily Moore (m. 1870; died 1875)
- Relations: Henry Somerset, 5th Duke of Beaufort (grandfather); John Poulett, 4th Earl Poulett (grandfather); FitzRoy Somerset, 1st Baron Raglan (uncle)
- Children: 4
- Parent(s): Lord Charles Somerset; Lady Mary Poulett
- Education: Eton College
- Alma mater: Royal Military College, Sandhurst

Colonel Poulett George Henry Somerset CB (19 June 1822 – 7 September 1875) was a British soldier and Conservative Party politician.

== Early life ==
Somerset was born on 19 June 1822. He was the eldest son of Lord Charles Somerset by his second wife, Lady Mary Poulett. From his father's first marriage to Lady Elizabeth Courtenay (daughter of the 8th Earl of Devon), he was a younger half-brother to Elizabeth Somerset (wife of Gen. Hon. Sir Henry Wyndham), Mary Georgiana Somerset (wife of Lt-Col. Stirling Freeman Glover), Lt.-Gen. Sir Henry Somerset, Charlotte Augusta Somerset (wife of Herbert Cornewoll), Lt.-Col. Charles Henry Somerset, and the Rev. Villiers Somerset (who married Frances Dorothy Ley). From his parents' marriage, he had two younger sisters, Mary Sophia Somerset and Augusta Anne Somerset (wife of Sir Henry Barron, 1st Baronet).

His paternal grandparents were Henry Somerset, 5th Duke of Beaufort and the former Elizabeth Boscawen (a daughter of Hon. Edward Boscawen, Admiral of the Blue, and sister to George Boscawen, 3rd Viscount Falmouth). His maternal grandparents were John Poulett, 4th Earl Poulett and the former Sophia Pocock (a daughter of Admiral Sir George Pocock).

Somerset was educated at Eton and the Royal Military College, Sandhurst.

== Career ==
He was commissioned into the Coldstream Guards in 1839. On 12 May 1851, Somerset was sentenced to 10 days’ imprisonment in Coldbath Fields Prison for horsewhipping a police constable who was on duty outside the Crystal Palace during the Great Exhibition. The police constable had attempted to stop Somerset from driving his carriage along a closed road, first by signalling, then a verbal warning, and finally by taking hold of the horse’s reins. Somerset responded by "lashing the constable with his whip over the head and face”. On sentencing, the magistrate commented “the law knows no distinction of persons … you, from your position, ought to have set an example of obedience to those in authority.”

Somerset served as an aide-de-camp to his uncle, Lord Raglan, during the Crimean War. He fought at the Alma, Balaclava, and Inkermann. At Inkermann, his horse was killed under him by a shell. He served at the Siege of Sevastopol and was made a CB for his Crimean services in 1855, as well as a Knight of the Order of the Medjidie, 4th Class.

=== Political career ===
In 1859, he was returned as Member of Parliament (MP) for Monmouthshire after his first cousin Edward Arthur Somerset resigned. He held the seat until 1871, when he became Steward of the Chiltern Hundreds.

== Personal life ==
On 15 April 1847, he married Barbara Augusta Norah Mytton (d. 4 June 1870), the daughter of John Mytton, by whom he had two sons and a daughter:

- Cecily Mary Caroline Somerset (1852–1862), who died young.
- Vere Francis John Somerset (1854–1909), who married Annette Katherine Hill and had issue.
- Henry Charles FitzRoy Somerset (1860–1925), who married and had issue.

He married Emily Moore on 10 September 1870, by whom he had one daughter:

- Cecily Emily Poulett Somerset (1871–1951), who married Capt. William Francis Annesley Wallace in 1896.

He died in 1875 and was buried in the nave of Bristol Cathedral.

Parliament of the United Kingdom
| Preceded by Octavius Morgan; Edward Arthur Somerset | Member of Parliament for Monmouthshire with Octavius Morgan; 1859–1871 | Succeeded by Octavius Morgan; Lord Henry Somerset |
