= Jeffrey Jeffreys =

Welsh politician (died 1709)

Sir Jeffrey Jeffreys (c. 1652 – 25 October 1709) was a Welsh Tory politician who sat as MP for Brecon from 1690 to 1698, and again from February 1701 until his death on 25 October 1709.

He was the third son of Watkin Jeffreys (died 1685) and Gwenllian, the daughter of Jevan Bowen. He was the brother of John Jeffreys. His marriage to Sarah, the daughter of Nicholas Dawes was licensed on 9 January 1680. They had three sons (one predeceased him) and six daughters. He was knighted on 20 October 1699.
