= Lord Henry Somerset =

British politician (1849–1932)

The Right Honourable Lord Henry Somerset PC, DL, JP

Comptroller of the Household
- In office 2 March 1874 – 4 February 1879
- Monarch: Victoria
- Prime Minister: Benjamin Disraeli
- Preceded by: Lord Otho FitzGerald
- Succeeded by: The Earl of Yarmouth

Member of Parliament for Monmouthshire
- In office 1871–1880 Serving with Octavius Morgan, Frederick Courtenay Morgan
- Preceded by: Octavius Morgan; Poulett Somerset
- Succeeded by: Frederick Courtenay Morgan; John Rolls

Personal details
- Born: Lord Henry Richard Charles Somerset; 7 December 1849 Kingstown, County Dublin
- Died: 10 October 1932 (aged 82) Florence, Italy
- Party: Conservative
- Spouse: Lady Isabella Somers-Cocks (m. 1872; died 1921)
- Children: Henry Somerset
- Parent(s): Henry Somerset, 8th Duke of Beaufort; Lady Georgiana Charlotte Curzon

Lord Henry Richard Charles Somerset, PC, DL, JP (7 December 1849 – 10 October 1932) was a British Conservative politician and composer of popular music. He served as Comptroller of the Household under Benjamin Disraeli between 1874 and 1879.

== Early life ==
Somerset was born at the Salt Hill Hotel, Kingstown, County Dublin, the second son of Henry Somerset, 8th Duke of Beaufort, by his wife Lady Georgiana Charlotte Curzon, daughter of Richard Curzon-Howe, 1st Earl Howe. He was the brother of Henry Somerset, 9th Duke of Beaufort, and Lord Arthur Somerset.

== Career ==
Somerset was elected at a by-election in 1871 as Member of Parliament (MP) for Monmouthshire, and held the seat until he stood down at the 1880 general election. When the Conservatives came to power in 1874 under Benjamin Disraeli, he was sworn of the Privy Council and appointed Comptroller of the Household, a post he held until 1879. Apart from his political career he was also a Deputy Lieutenant of Monmouthshire and a justice of the peace for Herefordshire and Monmouthshire.

== Personal life ==
Somerset married Lady Isabella Caroline Somers-Cocks, the eldest daughter and co-heir of Charles Somers-Cocks, 3rd Earl Somers, on 6 February 1872. They had one child, but their marriage collapsed after a few years because of Lord Henry's infatuation with a seventeen-year-old boy and his homosexuality.

As a result, he withdrew to Italy, while his wife was ostracised from society for having made public, contrary to the conventions of the time, why she had left him. Their only child was:

- Henry Charles Somers Augustus (1874–1945), who married Lady Katherine Beauclerk, a daughter of William Beauclerk, 10th Duke of St Albans; their grandson, David Somerset, 11th Duke of Beaufort, would succeed to the dukedom of Beaufort in 1984. After Lady Katherine's death, he married Brenda, dowager Marchioness of Dufferin and Ava, widow of Frederick Hamilton-Temple-Blackwood, 3rd Marquess of Dufferin and Ava, and only daughter of Major Robert Woodhouse, of Orford House, Bishop's Stortford, Hertfordshire, on 28 January 1932. They had no issue.

Lady Henry died in March 1921. Somerset remained a widower until his death in Florence in October 1932, aged 82.

=== Poetry and music ===
Somerset is the author of a book of poetry, Songs of adieu (1889), which the scholar Timothy D'Arch Smith has identified as "the first book of Uranian verse". He was also a composer of several songs including A song of sleep (Ricordi, 1903). His setting to music of Christina Rossetti's Echo enjoyed considerable success when it was published by Chappell & Co. c. 1900.

Parliament of the United Kingdom
Preceded by Octavius Morgan; Poulett Somerset	Member of Parliament for Monmouthshire; 1871 – 1880; With: Octavius Morgan 1841-74, Frederick Courtenay Morgan 1874-85	Succeeded by Frederick Courtenay Morgan; John Rolls
Political offices
Preceded by Lord Otho FitzGerald	Comptroller of the Household; 1874–1879	Succeeded by The Earl of Yarmouth
