= Monmouthshire (constituency) =

UK Parliament constituency (1801–1885, 2024 onwards)

Coordinates: 51.768°N 2.811°W

- constituency for the House of Commons
- Interactive map of the constituency.
- Location of the constituency within Wales
- Electorate: 72,681 (March 2020)
- Major settlements: Abergavenny, Monmouth, Chepstow, Caldicot, Usk

Current constituency
- Created: 2024
- Member of Parliament: Catherine Fookes (Labour)
- Seats: one
- Created from: Monmouth and Newport East

1536–1885
- Seats: one
- Type of constituency: County constituency
- Replaced by: North Monmouthshire, South Monmouthshire, West Monmouthshire

Overlaps
- Senedd: Sir Fynwy Torfaen

Monmouthshire (Welsh: Sir Fynwy) is a constituency of the House of Commons in the UK Parliament, and was first contested at the 2024 general election, following the 2023 review of Westminster constituencies. Its current MP is Catherine Fookes, a member of the Labour Party.

It previously existed as a county constituency of the House of Commons of the Parliament of England from 1536 until 1707, of the Parliament of Great Britain from 1707 to 1801, and of the Parliament of the United Kingdom from 1801 to 1885. It elected two Members of Parliament (MPs).

In 1885 the Monmouthshire constituency was divided to create North Monmouthshire, South Monmouthshire and West Monmouthshire.

== History and boundaries ==
Monmouthshire was given representation in the Parliament of England by the Laws in Wales Acts 1535 and 1542. This was later a key point in the long-standing argument about whether the county was or was not part of Wales.

Until the Great Reform Act of 1832, the historic Monmouthshire county constituency covered almost the whole of the county of Monmouth, but not the county town of Monmouth, which was a separate borough constituency. In 1832 this was expanded into the Monmouth Boroughs, taking in more towns to give it more electors.

The Redistribution of Seats Act 1885 split the county constituency into three, North, South, and West Monmouthshire, and then the Representation of the People Act 1918 abolished these, with most of the county joining a new seat called Monmouth. This included the towns of Chepstow, Monmouth, and Abergavenny.

The Monmouthshire constituency was re-established as part of the 2023 review for the 2024 general election under the June 2023 final proposals of the Boundary Commission for Wales. The boundaries were defined as being coterminous with the unitary authority of the County of Monmouthshire, so it does not now include those parts of the county in the area of the Newport City Council.

== Members of Parliament ==
=== MPs 1542–1653 ===
Year	First member	Second member
1542	No names known	
1545	Walter Herbert	Charles Herbert
1547	Sir Thomas Morgan	William Herbert
1553 (Mar)		
1553 (Oct)	Sir Charles Herbert	Thomas Somerset
1554 (Apr)	Thomas Herbert	James Gunter
1554 (Nov)	Thomas Somerset	David Lewis
1555	William Herbert	William Morgan
1558	Francis Somerset	William Morgan
1559 (Jan)	William Morgan I	Thomas Herbert
1562–1563	Matthew Herbert	George Herbert
1571	Charles Somerset	William Morgan
1572 (May)	Charles Somerset	Henry Herbert
1584 (Sep)	Sir William Herbert	Edward Morgan
1586 (Sep)	Sir William Herbert	Edward Morgan
1588 (Oct)	Thomas Morgan II	William John Proger
1593	Sir William Herbert (died in office, 1593)	Edward Kemeys
1597 (Sep)	Henry Herbert	John Arnold
1601 (Oct)	Thomas Somerset	Henry Morgan
1604	Thomas Somerset	Sir John Herbert
1614	Walter Montagu	William Jones
1621	Sir Edmund Morgan	Charles Williams
1624	Robert Viscount Lisle	Sir William Morgan
1625	Robert Viscount Lisle	Sir William Morgan
1626	Nicholas Arnold	William Herbert
1628	Nicholas Arnold	Nicholas Kemeys
1629–1640	No Parliaments convened	
Apr 1640	William Morgan	Walter Rumsey
Nov 1640	Sir Charles Williams repl. 1642 by Henry Herbert	William Herbert, disabled 1644
1645	John Herbert	Henry Herbert
1648	John Herbert	Henry Herbert
1653	Philip Jones	

=== MPs 1654–1660 ===
Year	First member	Second member	Third member
1654	Richard Cromwell, sat for Hampshire repl. by Thomas Morgan	Philip Jones sat for Glamorgan repl. by Thomas Hughes	Henry Herbert
1656	Major General James Berry, sat for Worcestershire repl. by Nathaniel Waterhouse	John Nicholas	Edward Herbert
1659	William Morgan	John Nicholas	

=== MPs 1660–1885 ===
Year	First member	First party	Second member	Second party
1660 (CP)	Henry Somerset, 1st Duke of Beaufort		William Morgan	
1661	Henry Somerset, 1st Duke of Beaufort		William Morgan	
1667	Sir Trevor Williams, Bt	Whig	William Morgan	
Feb 1679	Charles, Lord Herbert		William Morgan	
Aug 1679	Sir Trevor Williams, Bt	Whig	William Morgan	
1680	Sir Trevor Williams, Bt	Whig	Sir Edward Morgan, Bt	
1681	Sir Trevor Williams, Bt	Whig	Sir Edward Morgan, Bt	
1685	Charles, Marquess of Worcester		Sir Charles Kemeys, Bt	
1689 (CP)	Charles, Marquess of Worcester		Sir Trevor Williams, Bt	Whig
1690	Charles, Marquess of Worcester		Thomas Morgan	
1695	Sir Charles Kemeys, Bt		Thomas Morgan	
1698	Sir John Williams, Bt		Thomas Morgan	
1700	Sir John Williams, Bt		Thomas Morgan	
1701 (Jan)	Sir John Williams, Bt		John Morgan	Whig
1705	Sir Hopton Williams, Bt		John Morgan	Whig
1708	Thomas Windsor	Tory	John Morgan	Whig
1710	Thomas Windsor	Tory	John Morgan	Whig
1712	James Gunter		John Morgan	Whig
Apr 1713	Thomas Lewis		John Morgan	Whig
Sep 1713	Sir Charles Kemeys, Bt	Tory	John Morgan	Whig
1715	Thomas Lewis		John Morgan	Whig
1720	Thomas Lewis		John Hanbury	Whig
1722	William Morgan, the Elder	Whig	John Hanbury	Whig
1727	William Morgan, the Elder	Whig	John Hanbury	Whig
1731	Lord Charles Somerset	Tory	John Hanbury	Whig
1734	Thomas Morgan, the Elder		John Hanbury	Whig
1735	Thomas Morgan, the Elder		Charles Hanbury Williams	Whig
1741	Thomas Morgan, the Elder		Charles Hanbury Williams	Whig
1747	William Morgan, the Younger	Whig	Capel Hanbury	
1754	William Morgan, the Younger	Whig	Capel Hanbury	
1761	William Morgan, the Younger	Whig	Capel Hanbury	
1763	Thomas Morgan, the Younger		Capel Hanbury	
1766	Thomas Morgan, the Younger		John Hanbury	Whig
1768	Thomas Morgan, the Younger		John Hanbury	Whig
1771	John Morgan		John Hanbury	Whig
1774	John Morgan		John Hanbury	Whig
1780	John Morgan		John Hanbury	Whig
1784	John Morgan		Henry, Viscount Nevill	
1785	John Morgan		James Rooke	
1790	John Morgan		James Rooke	
1792	Robert Salusbury		James Rooke	
1796	Lt Col Sir Charles Morgan	Whig	James Rooke	
1802	Lt Col Sir Charles Morgan	Whig	James Rooke	
1805	Lt Col Sir Charles Morgan	Whig	Capt Lord Arthur Somerset	
1806	Lt Col Sir Charles Morgan	Whig	Capt Lord Arthur Somerset	
1807	Lt Col Sir Charles Morgan	Whig	Capt Lord Arthur Somerset	
1812	Lt Col Sir Charles Morgan	Whig	Capt Lord Arthur Somerset	
1816	Lt Col Sir Charles Morgan	Whig	Lord Granville Somerset	Tory
1818	Lt Col Sir Charles Morgan	Whig	Lord Granville Somerset	Tory
1820	Lt Col Sir Charles Morgan	Whig	Lord Granville Somerset	Tory
1826	Lt Col Sir Charles Morgan	Whig	Lord Granville Somerset	Tory
1830	Lt Col Sir Charles Morgan	Whig	Lord Granville Somerset	Tory
1831	William Addams Williams	Whig	Lord Granville Somerset	Tory
1832	William Addams Williams	Whig	Lord Granville Somerset	Tory
1834	William Addams Williams	Whig	Lord Granville Somerset	Conservative
1835	William Addams Williams	Whig	Lord Granville Somerset	Conservative
1837	William Addams Williams	Whig	Lord Granville Somerset	Conservative
1841	Octavius Morgan	Conservative	Lord Granville Somerset	Conservative
1847	Octavius Morgan	Conservative	Lord Granville Somerset	Conservative
1848	Octavius Morgan	Conservative	Edward Arthur Somerset	Conservative
1852	Octavius Morgan	Conservative	Edward Arthur Somerset	Conservative
1857	Octavius Morgan	Conservative	Edward Arthur Somerset	Conservative
1859	Octavius Morgan	Conservative	Col Poulett Somerset	Conservative
1865	Octavius Morgan	Conservative	Col Poulett Somerset	Conservative
1868	Octavius Morgan	Conservative	Col Poulett Somerset	Conservative
1871	Octavius Morgan	Conservative	Lord Henry Somerset	Conservative
1874	Col Frederick Morgan	Conservative	Lord Henry Somerset	Conservative
1880	Col Frederick Morgan	Conservative	John Rolls	Conservative
1885	Constituency divided into: North Monmouthshire, South Monmouthshire, and West Monmouthshire			

=== MPs since 2024 ===
Monmouth and Newport East prior to 2024

Election	Member	Party
2024	Catherine Fookes	Labour

== Election results ==
=== Elections in the 2020s ===
General election 2024: Monmouthshire
Party	Candidate	Votes	%	±%
Labour	Catherine Fookes	21,010	41.3	+9.7
Conservative	David TC Davies	17,672	34.8	−17.3
Reform	Max Windsor-Peplow	5,438	10.7	+9.8
Green	Ian Chandler	2,357	4.6	+2.1
Liberal Democrats	William Powell	2,279	4.5	−5.1
Plaid Cymru	Ioan Rhys Bellin	1,273	2.5	+0.1
Independent	Owen Lewis	457	0.9	N/A
True & Fair	June Davies	255	0.5	N/A
Heritage	Emma Meredith	103	0.2	N/A
Majority		3,338	6.5	
Turnout		50,844	68.0	
Registered electors		74,823		
Labour win (new seat)				

=== Elections in the 2010s ===
2019 notional result (Note: Estimate of the 2019 general election result as if the revised boundaries recommended under the 2023 boundary review were in place)
Party	Vote	%
Conservative	27,568	52.1
Labour	16,731	31.6
Liberal Democrats	5,071	9.6
Green Party	1,333	2.5
Plaid Cymru	1,283	2.4
Brexit Party	451	0.9
Independent	435	0.8
Majority	10,837	20.5
Turnout	52,872	72.7
Electorate	72,681	

=== Elections in the 1880s ===
General election 1880: Monmouthshire
Party	Candidate	Votes	%	±%
Conservative	Frederick Courtenay Morgan	3,529	27.6	N/A
Conservative	John Rolls	3,294	25.8	N/A
Liberal	George Charles Brodrick	3,019	23.6	N/A
Liberal	Marshall Warmington	2,927	22.9	N/A
Majority		275	2.2	N/A
Turnout		6,385 (est)	75.0 (est)	N/A
Registered electors		8,518		
Conservative hold		Swing	N/A	
Conservative hold		Swing	N/A	

=== Elections in the 1870s ===
1874 Monmouthshire by-election
Party	Candidate	Votes	%	±%
Conservative	Henry Somerset	Unopposed		
Registered electors		7,630		
Conservative hold				

Somerset was appointed Comptroller of the Household, triggering a by-election.

General election 1874: Monmouthshire
Party	Candidate	Votes	%	±%
Conservative	Frederick Courtenay Morgan	Unopposed		
Conservative	Henry Somerset	Unopposed		
Registered electors		7,630		
Conservative hold				
Conservative hold				

1871 Monmouthshire by-election
Party	Candidate	Votes	%	±%
Conservative	Lord Henry Somerset	Unopposed		
Registered electors				
Conservative hold				

Somerset resigned, triggering a by-election.

=== Elections in the 1860s ===
General election 1868: Monmouthshire
Party	Candidate	Votes	%	±%
Conservative	Octavius Morgan	3,761	39.1	N/A
Conservative	Poulett Somerset	3,525	36.6	N/A
Liberal	Henry Morgan-Clifford	2,338	24.3	N/A
Majority		1,187	12.3	N/A
Turnout		5,981 (est)	75.0 (est)	N/A
Registered electors		7,971		
Conservative hold				
Conservative hold				

General election 1865: Monmouthshire
Party	Candidate	Votes	%	±%
Conservative	Octavius Morgan	Unopposed		
Conservative	Poulett Somerset	Unopposed		
Registered electors		4,909		
Conservative hold				
Conservative hold				

=== Elections in the 1850s ===
1859 Monmouthshire by-election
Party	Candidate	Votes	%	±%
Conservative	Poulett Somerset	Unopposed		
Registered electors				
Conservative hold				

Somerset resigned by accepting the office of Steward of the Manor of Hempholme, triggering a by-election.

General election 1859: Monmouthshire
Party	Candidate	Votes	%	±%
Conservative	Octavius Morgan	Unopposed		
Conservative	Edward Arthur Somerset	Unopposed		
Registered electors		5,073		
Conservative hold				
Conservative hold				

General election 1857: Monmouthshire
Party	Candidate	Votes	%	±%
Conservative	Octavius Morgan	Unopposed		
Conservative	Edward Arthur Somerset	Unopposed		
Registered electors		5,099		
Conservative hold				
Conservative hold				

General election 1852: Monmouthshire
Party	Candidate	Votes	%	±%
Conservative	Octavius Morgan	Unopposed		
Conservative	Edward Arthur Somerset	Unopposed		
Registered electors		4,973		
Conservative hold				
Conservative hold				

=== Elections in the 1840s ===
1848 Monmouthshire by-election
Party	Candidate	Votes	%	±%
Conservative	Edward Arthur Somerset	Unopposed		
Registered electors				
Conservative hold				

Somerset's death caused a by-election.

General election 1847: Monmouthshire
Party	Candidate	Votes	%	±%
Conservative	Octavius Morgan	2,334	34.6	N/A
Conservative	Granville Somerset	2,230	33.0	N/A
Conservative	Edward Arthur Somerset	2,187	32.4	N/A
Majority		43	0.6	N/A
Turnout		3,376 (est)	63.9 (est)	N/A
Registered electors		5,286		
Conservative hold		Swing	N/A	
Conservative hold		Swing	N/A	

September 1841 Monmouthshire by-election
Party	Candidate	Votes	%	±%
Conservative	Granville Somerset	Unopposed		
Registered electors				
Conservative hold				

Somerset was appointed Chancellor of the Duchy of Lancaster, triggering a by-election.

General election 1841: Monmouthshire
Party	Candidate	Votes	%	±%
Conservative	Granville Somerset	Unopposed		
Conservative	Octavius Morgan	Unopposed		
Registered electors		4,393		
Conservative hold				
Conservative gain from Whig				

February 1841 Monmouthshire by-election
Party	Candidate	Votes	%	±%
Conservative	Octavius Morgan	Unopposed		
Registered electors				
Conservative gain from Whig				

Williams resigned by accepting the office of Steward of the Chiltern Hundreds, triggering a by-election

=== Elections in the 1830s ===
General election 1837: Monmouthshire
Party	Candidate	Votes	%
Conservative	Granville Somerset	Unopposed	
Whig	William Addams Williams	Unopposed	
Registered electors		4,347	
Conservative hold			
Whig hold			

General election 1835: Monmouthshire
Party	Candidate	Votes	%
Conservative	Granville Somerset	Unopposed	
Whig	William Addams Williams	Unopposed	
Registered electors		3,714	
Conservative hold			
Whig hold			

General election 1832: Monmouthshire
Party	Candidate	Votes	%
Tory	Granville Somerset	Unopposed	
Whig	William Addams Williams	Unopposed	
Registered electors		3,738	
Tory hold			
Whig hold			

General election 1831: Monmouthshire
Party	Candidate	Votes	%
Tory	Granville Somerset	Unopposed	
Whig	William Addams Williams	Unopposed	
Registered electors		c. 2,000	
Tory hold			
Whig hold			

General election 1830: Monmouthshire
Party	Candidate	Votes	%
Tory	Granville Somerset	Unopposed	
Whig	Charles Morgan	Unopposed	
Registered electors		c. 2,000	
Tory hold			
Whig hold			
