= Samuel Marsh (politician) =

British Member of Parliament (died 1795)

Samuel Marsh (c. 1736–1795) was a London merchant and politician who sat in the House of Commons from 1774 to 1780.

Marsh was the son of William Marsh, a Blackwell Hall factor, and his wife Anne Fludyer, daughter of Samuel Fludyer, and sister of Sir Samuel Fludyer, 1st Baronet. He married firstly Annabella Graeme, daughter of Thomas Graeme in 1762. The Marsh family was closely linked in business with the Fludyer family and either Marsh or his father was in partnership with the Fludyers. At least by 1775 Marsh was registered as a Blackwall Hall factor. He was living at Battersea Rise when he married as his second wife Frances Elizabeth Bennet on 31 July 1773.

At the 1774 general election Marsh was returned unopposed as Member of Parliament for Chippenham on the Fludyer interest, probably as a stop-gap as Samuel Fludyer's sons were still under age. In Parliament he was considered a person who generally voted with the Government, but occasionally voted with the opposition. He did not stand for Parliament again in 1780.

Marsh succeeded his father on 2 March 1778. He died on 18 March 1795, aged 58. With his first wife he had two sons and two daughters including Caroline, who married William Addams Williams, MP for Monmouthshire.

Parliament of Great Britain
Preceded by Sir Edward Bayntun-Rolt; Henry Dawkins	Member of Parliament for Chippenham; 1774–1780; With: Sir Edward Bayntun-Rolt	Succeeded by Henry Dawkins; Giles Hudson
