= Henry Morgan (of Llandaff) =

Member of the Parliament of England

Henry Morgan (died 1632) was a Welsh politician who sat in the House of Commons in 1601.

Morgan was the eldest son of Henry Morgan of Llandaff and Penllwyn-Sarth. In 1601, he was elected Member of Parliament for Monmouthshire. He was High Sheriff of Monmouthshire in 1603.

Morgan married Cicely Welsh, daughter of Arnold Welsh of Llanwern.

Parliament of England
Preceded by Henry Herbert; John Arnold	Member of Parliament for Monmouthshire; 1601; With: Thomas Somerset	Succeeded by Thomas Somerset; Sir John Herbert
