= Treaty of Troyes (1564) =

1564 treaty between France and England

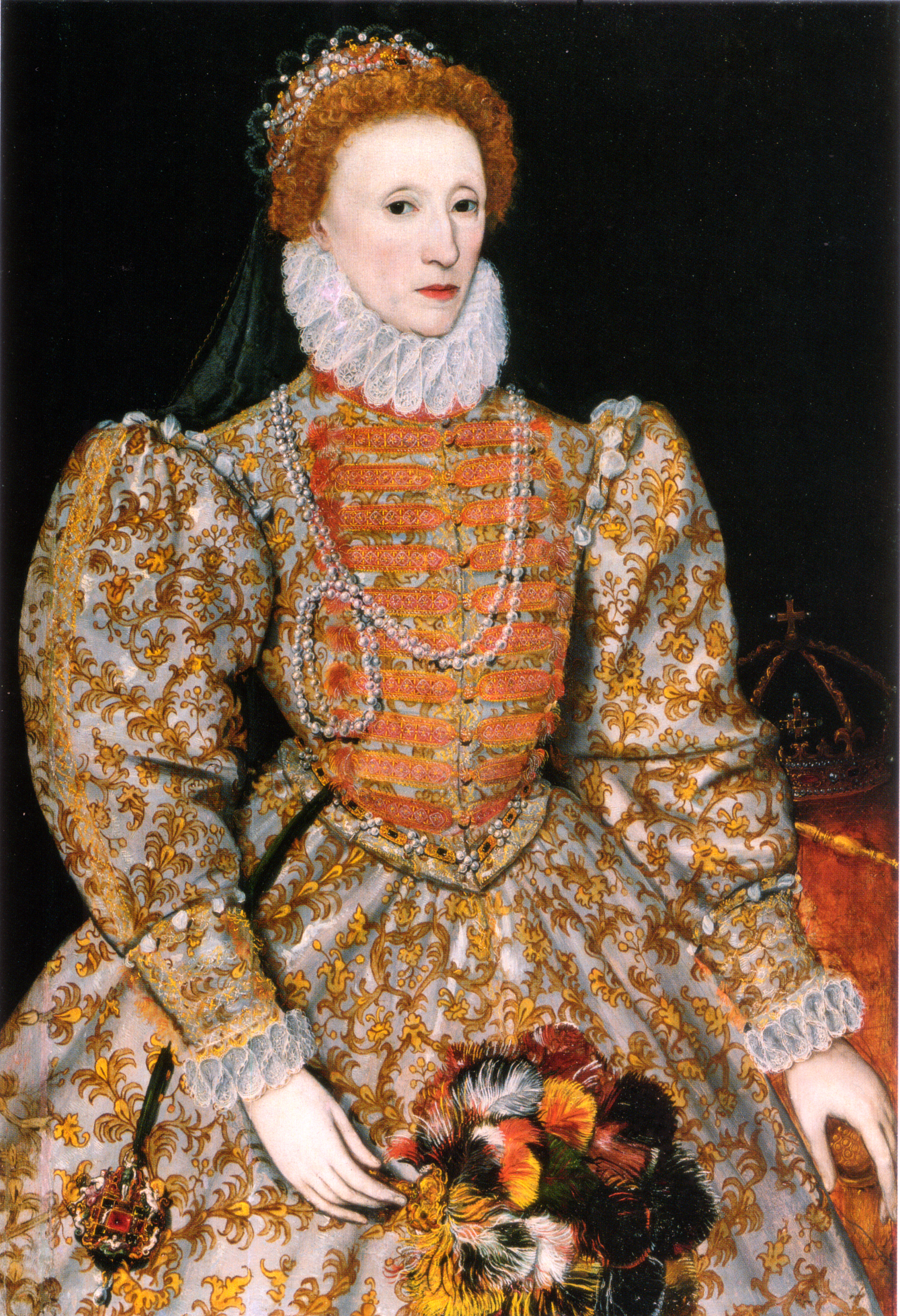
Queen Elizabeth I of England subsequently recognized French ownership of Calais after the treaty, but kept using the title of Queen of France nonetheless

The Treaty of Troyes of 1564 was an agreement between the rival kingdoms of England and France after the ejection of English forces from France in 1563 which recognized French ownership of Calais in return of France's payment to England 120,000 crowns.

== Background ==
On 7 January 1558, during the reign of Mary I of England, Henry II of France sent forces led by the Duke of Guise, who laid siege to Calais. When the French attacked, they were able to surprise the English at the critical strongpoint of Fort Nieulay and the sluice gates, which could have flooded the attackers, remained unopened. Thus Calais was regained by the French.

In spite of this, Elizabeth I, Mary's sister and successor, revived the English claim on Calais and took the French port of Le Havre in 1562 with support of the Huguenots, but the French troops ejected the English troops from France, and subsequently in 1564, an agreement was reached between England and France under which France paid England 120,000 crowns in return for English recognition of French control over Calais. This was likely done to gain France's support for the Dutch Revolt against Spain.
