= Charles Williams (of Llangibby) =

Welsh politician

Sir Charles Williams (1591–1641) was a Welsh politician who sat in the House of Commons from 1621 to 1622 and from 1640 to 1641.

Williams was the son of Sir Rowland Williams of Llangibby. He matriculated at Jesus College, Oxford, on 16 June 1610, aged 19. He became a student of Inner Temple in November 1611. In 1621, Williams was elected Member of Parliament for Monmouthshire. He was knighted on 10 April 1621. In 1627 he was High Sheriff of Monmouthshire. In November 1640, Williams was elected MP for Monmouthshire in the Long Parliament. He sat until his death in 1641.

Williams married firstly Frances Morgan, daughter of Sir William Morgan of Tredegar. He married secondly Anne Trevor, daughter of Sir John Trevor of Plas Teg, Flint. His son Trevor became a baronet.

Parliament of England
Preceded by Walter Montagu; William Jones	Member of Parliament for Monmouthshire; 1621–1622; With: Sir Edmund Morgan	Succeeded by Robert Viscount Lisle; Sir William Morgan
Preceded by William Morgan; Walter Rumsey	Member of Parliament for Monmouthshire; 1640–1641; With: William Herbert	Succeeded by William Herbert; Henry Herbert
