= Sir Hopton Williams, 3rd Baronet =

English politician (1663–1723)

Sir Hopton Williams, 3rd Baronet of Llangibby (c. 1663 – 20 November 1723) was an English politician. He sat as MP for Monmouthshire from 1705 till 1708.

He was the third but second surviving son of Sir Trevor Williams, 1st Baronet and Elizabeth, the daughter of Thomas Morgan. On 7 September 1683, he married Frances Williams and they had one son who predeceased him and one daughter. He succeeded his brother Sir John Williams, 2nd Baronet, of Llangibby on 21 November 1704.

He died on 20 November 1723 and his title and estate passed to his nephew, Sir John Williams, 4th Baronet.
