= Tregrug Castle =

Medieval castle in Monmouthshire, Wales

- Castle remains in 2011

- Location within Monmouthshire
- 51°40′18.13728″N 02°55′13.70676″W
- Location: Llangybi, Monmouthshire

Site notes
- Governing body: Privately owned

Scheduled monument
- Official name: Llangybi Castle (Castell Tregrug)
- Reference no.: MM109

Scheduled monument
- Official name: Tregrug Castle, Llangybi; Earthwork Castle, Llangibby Castle Mound
- Reference no.: MM110

Cadw/ICOMOS Register of Parks and Gardens of Special Historic Interest in Wales
- Official name: Llangybi House
- Designated: 1 February 2022
- Reference no.: PGW(Gt)27(Mon)
- Listing: Grade II

Tregrug Castle (Welsh: Castell Tregrug; Welsh pronunciation: [ˈkastɛɬ trɛˈɡriːɡ]) or Llangibby Castle is a ruin in Monmouthshire, Wales, located about 1 mile (1.5 km) to the north of the village of Llangybi, close to the settlement of Tregrug.

The castle appears to have superseded an earlier Norman motte-and-bailey castle, which is first mentioned in records dating from 1262. Surrounded by dense woodland, on the top of a ridge, the present remains include a large, nearly rectangular walled enclosure, about 164 m (180 yards) by 78 m (85 yards), surrounded by ditches - the size of the bailey makes it the largest single-enclosure castle in England and Wales. The bailey is entered through a gatehouse, to the left of which stands a large stone tower, known as the 'Lord's Tower'. Recent archaeological thinking suggests that the castle's main function may have been recreational rather than defensive; it was probably built as a hunting lodge, with accompanying gardens in the style of a late medieval ‘pleasance’. The castle had fallen into disuse by the 16th century but was refortified and garrisoned during the English Civil War. Slighted at the war's end, it was subsequently redeveloped as a landscape garden feature, to complement a new house, New Llangibby Castle, which was built in the grounds at the very end of the 17th century.

== Name ==
The ruin is called by several different names, including Tregrug Castle (from the Welsh spelling of the nearest settlement), Tregruk Castle (English phonetic form) and Llangybi (or Llangibby) Castle. It is unclear whether the settlement of Tregrug was named after the hilltop structure, or the structure was named after the settlement.

== History ==
The original castle on the site, a Norman motte-and-bailey to the east of the existing ruins, is first recorded in 1262. This castle was later superseded by the current structure. The estate, including the motte-and-bailey, came into the ownership of the de Clare family in 1245, and was in possession of Bogo de Clare (1248-1294), the third son of Richard de Clare, for some years before his death. In 1369, the community of Tregrug was severely affected by one of the later outbreaks of the plague. A new ambitious noble residence, enclosed in a high stone wall, with defensive banks and ditches, was started in the early 14th century, probably by Gilbert de Clare. The castle passed briefly into the hands of the Despenser family; it may have been Hugh Despenser who began the construction of the late medieval structure from which most of the now-standing ruins derive. (Note: Both Whittle (1992) and Salter (2002) favour de Clare as the builder, although Salter acknowledges the possibility of the later castle being the work of Hugh Despenser, during his brief ownership.) It was attacked during the revolt of Llywelyn Bren in 1316.

The historian John Kenyon has suggested that much of the later work at the castle may have been undertaken by Gilbert's widow, Matilda, and by his sister and heiress, Elizabeth de Burgh, after Gilbert's death at the Battle of Bannockburn in 1314. Kenyon supports the contention that the primary purpose of the castle was as a “grand country retreat or hunting lodge, albeit martial in appearance”, rather than a truly defensive structure.

Tregrug came into Crown ownership and was sold by Queen Mary to the Williams family of Usk in 1554. During the English Civil War the dilapidated castle was refortified and held by an influential local magnate, Sir Trevor Williams, 1st Baronet. (Note: Sir Trevor’s frequent changes of allegiance during the Civil War and its aftermath saw him support firstly Charles I, then Parliament, then revert to the king, before again siding with Parliament and finally aligning with Charles II at the Restoration. This gained him a reputation for unreliability. Oliver Cromwell recorded his impressions of Sir Trevor in a letter dated 17 June 1648: “Sir Trevor is the most dangerous man by far… He is a man full of craft and subtlety, full of jealousy, partly out of guilt.”) At the end of the war, the castle was slighted.

In the late 17th century, the Williams family built a new house nearby, known as New Llangibby Castle, (Note: Tyerman and Warner (1951) repeat the myth that the new castle was "designed by Inigo Jones". John Newman notes the conscious attempt to imitate the architecture of the almost contemporaneous Troy House, another building erroneously ascribed to Jones.) adapted the castle ruins to a landscape garden feature and in around 1707 established an avenue of Scots Pines which ran from the gates of the estate to the River Usk. In the late-19th century, the motte was planted over with conifer trees and rhododendron, having previously been used as a bowling green. These were felled in the early 21st century, as were the softwood trees planted in the central enclosure, while New Llangibby Castle was demolished in 1951. (Note: The Georgian house, known as New Llangibby Castle, was still standing when Tyerman and Warner published their Monmouthshire volume of Arthur Mee’s’s The King’s England in February 1951. They described the avenue of Scots Pines which was also noted by John Newman in his Monmouthshire volume of the Buildings of Wales published in 2000.) The north and south stable ranges, both contemporaneous with the new house, remain and are Grade II listed buildings. The site is listed at Grade II on the Cadw/ICOMOS Register of Parks and Gardens of Special Historic Interest in Wales. Tregrug Castle, and the remnants of the original motte-and-bailey fortification, are scheduled monuments.

=== 2010 archaeological investigation ===
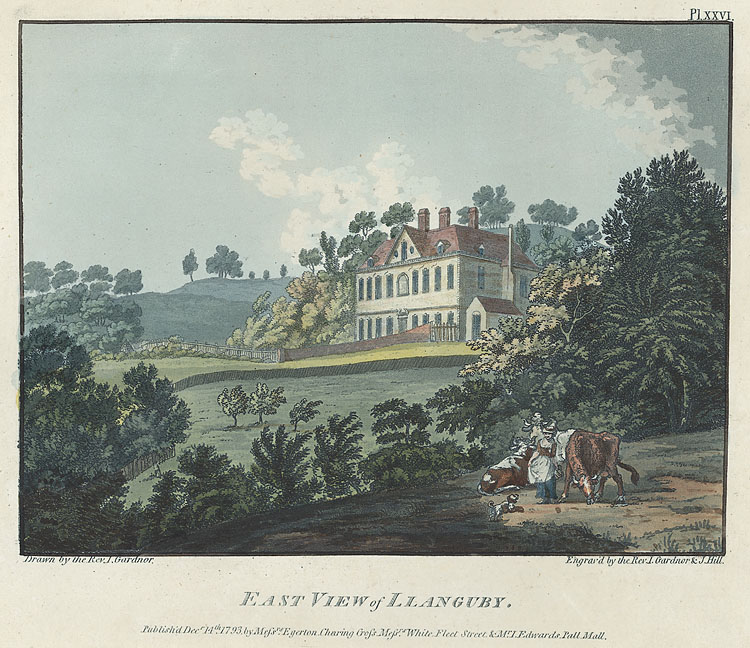
View of New Llangibby Castle dating from 1793

In 2010, the remains at Tregrug were investigated by Channel 4 television's Time Team. The archaeologists concluded that the banks and ditches surrounding the walls were almost entirely Civil War defences, and that the castle had been substantially remodelled in the later 17th century to provide a new main entrance, and to landscape the area inside the walls to form a garden. Some of the ruins became garden features, and others were removed to make way for the landscape garden and the carriage road. The archaeological team had available the extensive historical record of cost accounts from medieval Tregrug, which show expenses for elaborate gardening for the structure. The team concluded that the structure was primarily residential rather than defensive in purpose, a medieval ‘pleasance’ (Note: “pleasance or pleasaunce: garden, especially that of a medieval castle, manor house or monastery”.) rather than a military castle.

== Description ==
The site is broadly rectilinear. The central bailey is 164 m (180 yards) by 78 m (85 yards), making it "one of the largest single-enclosure castles in Britain." The bailey is entered through a "huge" gatehouse in the south-west corner, with two D-shaped towers, similar in design to the entrance tower at Beaumaris Castle. Turrets either side of the towers contain latrines. John Kenyon suggests that the high quality of the design and construction of these facilities, built in finely cut ashlar, is indicative of the domestic and recreational purposes of the castle. To the north-west stands the 'Lord's Tower', the only other tower still standing to any height. The curtain wall which surrounds the bailey is still largely intact.

== Sources ==
- Cambrian Archaeological Association (1936). "Llangibby Castle". Archaeologia Cambrensis. 91. W. Pickering.
- Curl, James; Wilson, Susan (2016). Oxford Dictionary of Architecture. Oxford: Oxford University Press. ISBN 978-0-199-67499-2. OCLC 1055586546.
- Howell, Ray (1988). A History Of Gwent. Llandysul, Ceredigion: Gomer Press. ISBN 978-0-863-83338-0. OCLC 19268836.
- Kenyon, John R. (2008). "4". In Griffiths, Ralph A.; Hopkins, Tony; Howell, Ray (eds.). The Age of the Marcher Lords, c.1070-1536. The Gwent County History. Vol. 2. Cardiff: University of Wales Press. ISBN 978-0-7083-2198-0. OCLC 836831938.
- Newman, John (2000). Gwent/Monmouthshire. The Buildings of Wales. London: Penguin. ISBN 978-0-300-09630-9.
- Newman, John (2009). "16". In Gray, Madeline; Morgan, Prys (eds.). The Making of Monmouthshire, 1536-1780. The Gwent County History. Vol. 3. Cardiff: University of Wales Press. ISBN 978-0-708-32198-0. OCLC 552064875.
- Salter, Mike (2002). Castles of Gwent, Glamorgan and Gower. Malvern, Worcestershire: Folly Publications. ISBN 978-1-871-73161-3. OCLC 54947157.
- Tyerman, Hugo; Warner, Sydney (1951). Arthur Mee (ed.). Monmouthshire: A Green and Smiling Land. The King's England. London: Hodder & Stoughton. OCLC 906097367.
- Wessex Archaeology (2009). Llangibby Castle, Near Usk, Monmouthshire, South Wales: Archaeological Evaluation and Assessment of Results (PDF). Salisbury, Wiltshire: Wessex Archaeology Ltd.
- Whittle, Elisabeth (1992). Glamorgan and Gwent. A Guide to Ancient and Historic Wales. London: HMSO. ISBN 978-0-117-01221-9. OCLC 473187732.
