= Edward Arthur Somerset =

British Army general

Lieutenant-General Edward Arthur Somerset CB
- Born: 2 February 1817
- Died: 12 March 1886 (aged 69)
- Spouse: Agatha Miles
- Children: 9

Lieutenant-General Edward Arthur Somerset CB (2 February 1817 – 12 March 1886) was a British soldier and Conservative Party politician, the son of Lord Robert Somerset.

The son of Lord Edward Somerset and his wife Louisa Augusta (née Courtenay), he joined the Rifle Brigade as a second lieutenant on 29 January 1836, becoming a lieutenant on 9 July 1840 and a captain on 31 January 1845. Somerset unsuccessfully contested Monmouthshire in 1847, but was returned as its Member of Parliament (MP) in 1848, and continued to represent it as a Conservative until accepting the Stewardship of the Manor of Hempholme on 23 June 1859.

Somerset married Agatha Miles (1827–1912), daughter of Sir William Miles, on 13 September 1849. They had one son and eight daughters:

- Agatha Georgiana Somerset (1850 – 10 May 1940), married Maj. Charles Arthur Baldwyn Knyvett Leighton on 10 April 1879 without issue.
- Evelyn Somerset (20 November 1857 – 1 July 1883), married George Caulfeild Prideaux Browne on 7 September 1882 and died in childbirth.
- Ada Frances Somerset (1861 – 17 March 1949), married Sir Henry Mather-Jackson, 3rd Baronet on 3 August 1886 and had five children.
- Maude Catherine Somerset (1862 – 6 June 1946) who died unmarried
- Lillian Somerset (1864 – 22 January 1947), married Sir Frederick Palmer, 6th Baronet on 29 December 1892 and had three sons.
- Lt. Edward William Henry Somerset (25 January 1866 – 20 March 1890), was Honorary Queen's Cadet at Sandhurst and served in the Royal Irish Rifles from 2 March 1887.
- Blanche Louisa Somerset (1868 – 20 August 1946), married John George Burdon on 4 February 1892
- Muriel Somerset (1870 – 25 November 1951), married Rev. William Neville on 7 November 1894
- Hilda Somerset (1872 – 16 May 1965 )who became a nun for the Sisters of Mercy, Community of the Sisters of the Church.

Somerset served in the 8th Xhosa War, and then in the Crimean War. He saw action at the Alma, Balaclava, and Inkermann. Shortly after, he was promoted major on 12 November 1854, and served at the Siege of Sevastopol, being promoted lieutenant-colonel on 23 March 1855. He was afterwards made a Knight 5th Class of the Medjidie, and awarded the CB in 1857.

He was promoted colonel on 29 May 1858, and major general on 6 March 1860. He was returned as member of parliament for West Gloucestershire in 1867, but was defeated the following year. Somerset served as acting Governor of Gibraltar from 1875 to 1876, and in 1878. On 1 October 1877, he was made lieutenant general. On 19 December 1881, he was appointed colonel of the 1st Battalion, Worcestershire Regiment. He resigned the colonelcy in 1883 when he went on the retired list, but was colonel-commandant of the 1st Battaltion, King's Royal Rifle Corps from 1884 until his death in 1886.

Parliament of the United Kingdom
Preceded by Lord Granville Somerset; Octavius Morgan	Member of Parliament for Monmouthshire; 1848–1859; With: Octavius Morgan	Succeeded by Octavius Morgan; Poulett Somerset
Preceded by Nigel Kingscote; Sir John Rolt	Member of Parliament for West Gloucestershire; 1867–1868; With: Nigel Kingscote	Succeeded by Nigel Kingscote; Samuel Marling
Military offices
Preceded by Charles Staveley	Colonel, 1st Battalion; Worcestershire Regiment; 1881–1883	Succeeded by William Parke
Preceded by Randal Rumley	Colonel-Commandant, 1st Battalion; King's Royal Rifle Corps; 1884–1886	Succeeded by Arthur Edward Hardinge
