= Treaty of Hampton Court (1562) =

1562 treaty between England and French Huguenots

- Signed: 22 September 1562
- Location: Hampton Court Palace, England
- Signatories: Elizabeth I of England; Louis I de Bourbon, prince de Condé
- Parties: England; Huguenots
- Language: Latin

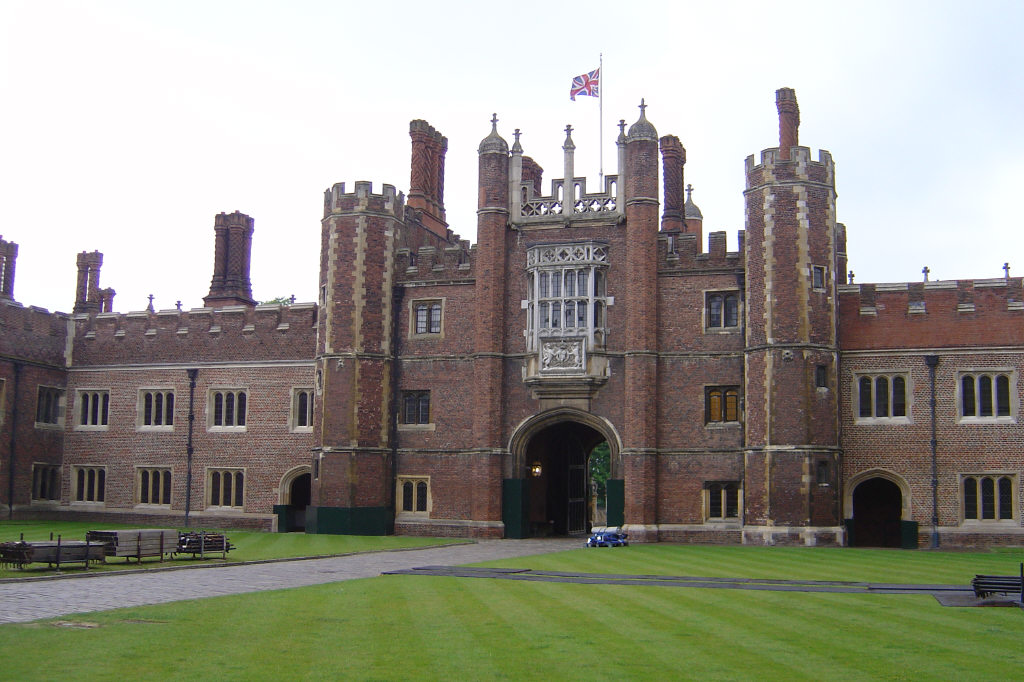
Hampton Court

The Treaty of Hampton Court (also known as the Treaty of Richmond) was signed on 22 September 1562 between Elizabeth I of England and French Huguenot leader Louis I de Bourbon, prince de Condé. The treaty was concluded by François de Beauvais, Seigneur de Briquemault. Based on the terms of the accord, 3,000 English troops were summoned to occupy Le Havre and Dieppe. Moreover, Queen Elizabeth promised to provide economic aid to the Huguenots. Once peace was restored in France, Elizabeth refused to withdraw her troops, stating that she had taken Le Havre not for religious reasons but to indemnify her for the loss of Calais, which was rightfully hers. The regent of France, Catherine de' Medici sent both Catholic and Huguenot troops against Le Havre, which surrendered on 28 July 1563. Feeling betrayed by the Huguenots, Elizabeth never trusted them again. This is evident when in 1572, Catherine de' Medici ordered the killing of the Protestant Coligny. This resulted in 3,000 Protestants being killed in what is known as the Massacre of St Bartholomew's Day. Elizabeth was urged to send support to the French Huguenots but refused.

== Motivation ==
The English Secretary of State, William Cecil was concerned with safeguarding the Protestant cause in Europe, fearing a Catholic alliance of France and Spain if the powerful Guise family gained an upper hand in the French Wars of Religion. Elizabeth I shared her advisor's concern for England's fragile Protestantism, but she was more concerned with the possibility of recovering Calais (lost by Mary I in 1558) which might have occurred had the Huguenots triumphed.

== See also ==
- List of treaties

== Sources ==
- Doran, Susan (2000). Elizabeth I and Foreign Policy 1558-1603. Routledge. ISBN 0-415-15355-7.
- Knecht, R. J. Catherine de' Medici. London and New York: Longman, 1998. ISBN 0-582-08241-2
