= Mechanical Galleon =

Ornamented clock in the form of a ship

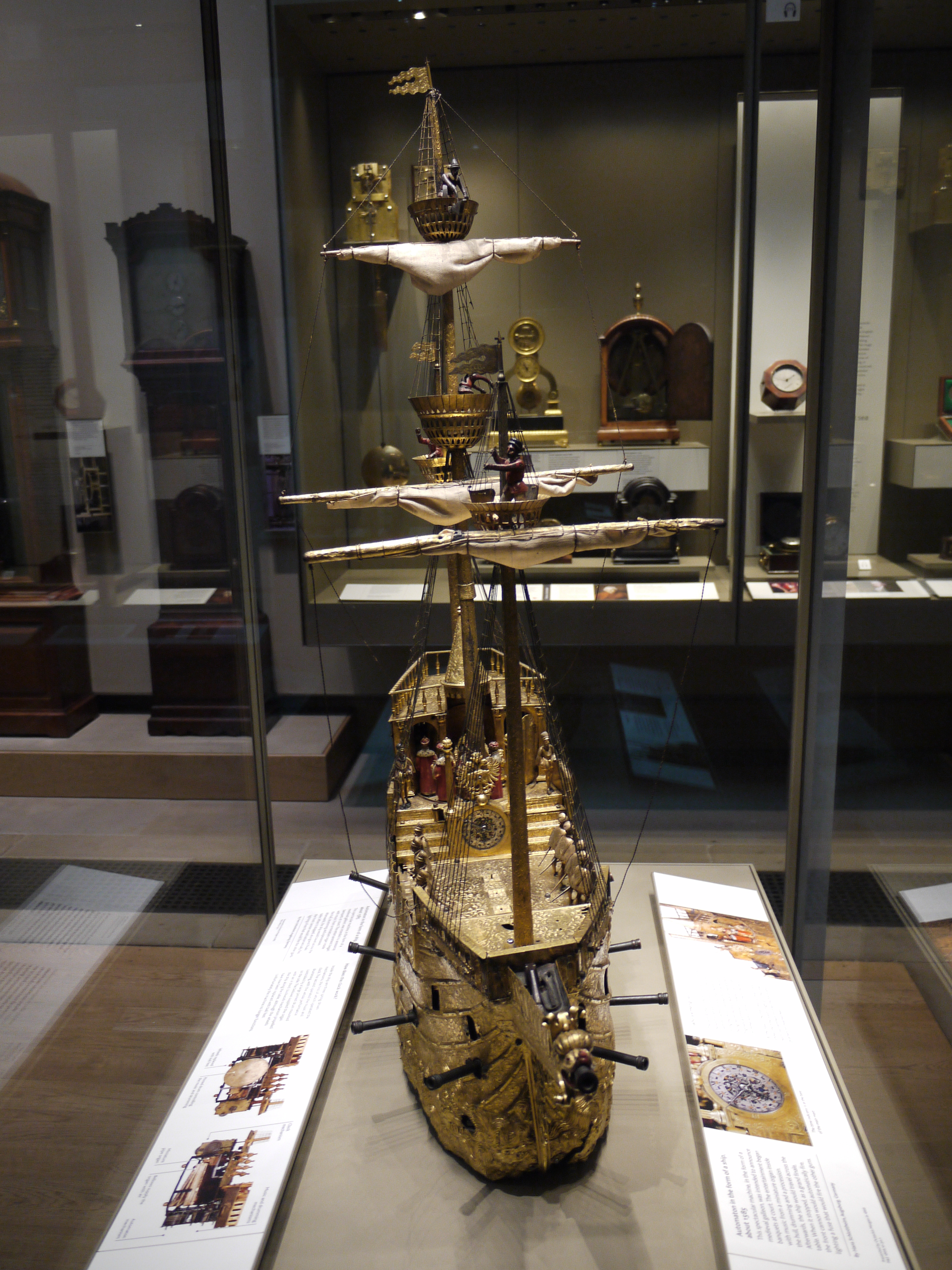
- Front view of the Mechanical Galleon
- Material: Gilt brass and steel with other materials
- Size: 78.5 cm long and 104 cm high
- Created: c. 1585 in Augsburg
- Present location: British Museum, London
- Identification: M&ME 1866,10-30,1

The Mechanical Galleon is an elaborate nef or table ornament in the form of a ship, which is also an automaton and clock. It was constructed in about 1585 by Hans Schlottheim in southern Germany. It was in the possession of Augustus, Elector of Saxony (who would have been one of the model courtiers shown on the ship). The model is now in the British Museum in London. Two other similar models are located in museums in France and Austria, the Château d'Écouen north of Paris, and the Kunsthistorisches Museum in Vienna.

== Construction ==
Nefs were extravagant ship-shaped table ornaments in precious metal that had been popular for some centuries among the very wealthy. Earlier types, such as the Burghley Nef now in the Victoria and Albert Museum in London, usually functioned as containers for salt, spices or other things, but the figures on deck in this example leave no room for a function of this sort. It is also mostly made of gilded brass, where earlier royal examples were usually in gold or at least silver-gilt.

In the sixteenth century there was an enthusiasm for clockwork automata, the production of which was funded by potentates including Rudolf II, Holy Roman Emperor and Suleyman the Magnificent. One of the craftsmen who made these automata was Hans Schlottheim. This particular piece was believed to have been owned by Rudolf II in Prague but recent evidence points to it having been on the inventory of the Kunstkammer of Augustus I, Elector of Saxony in Dresden in 1585.

Hans Schlottheim was a goldsmith and clockmaker who lived from 1547 to 1625. The important development that made these automata possible was the discovery of coiled tempered steel. It was possible to store potential energy in the coiled spring steel to create a portable energy supply. Clockwork was new and would have been regarded as "magic" in the sixteenth century.

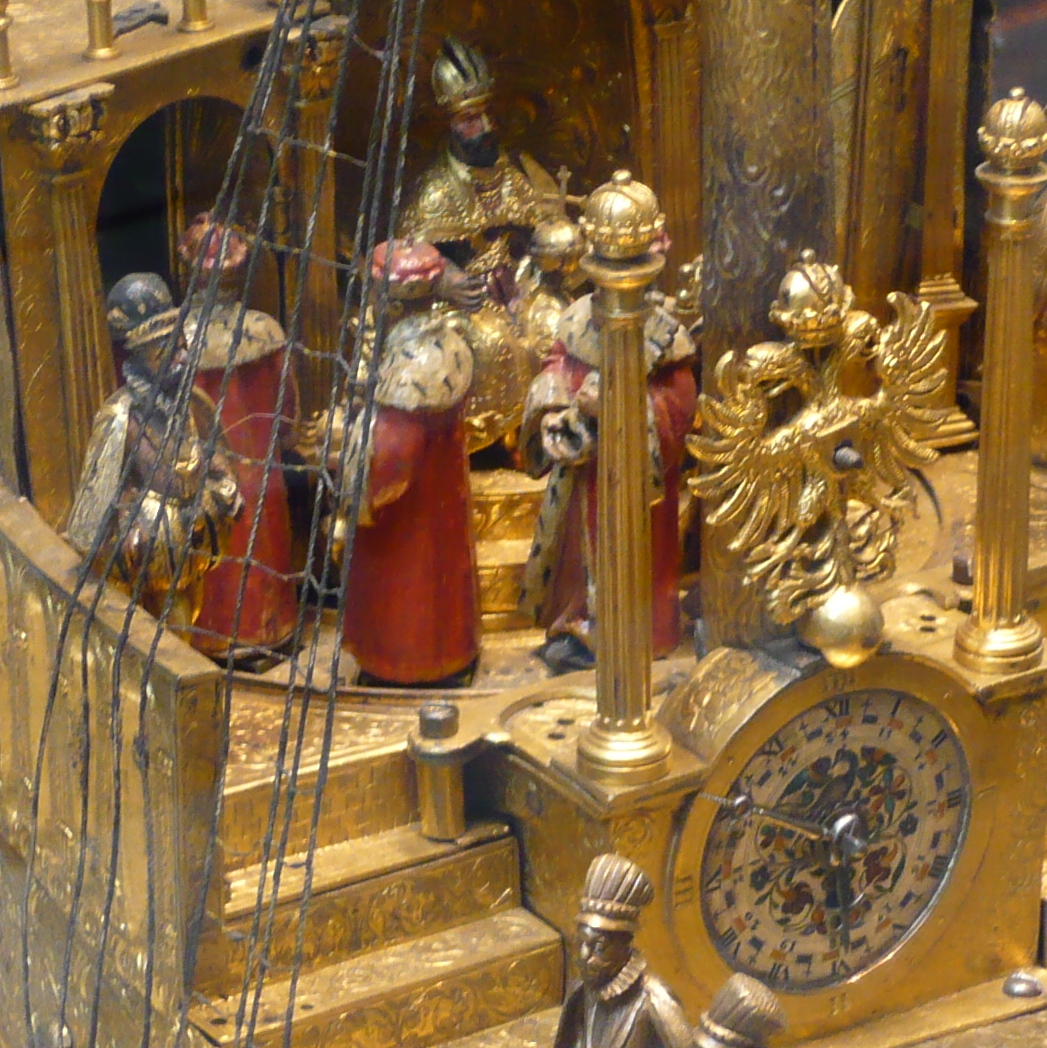
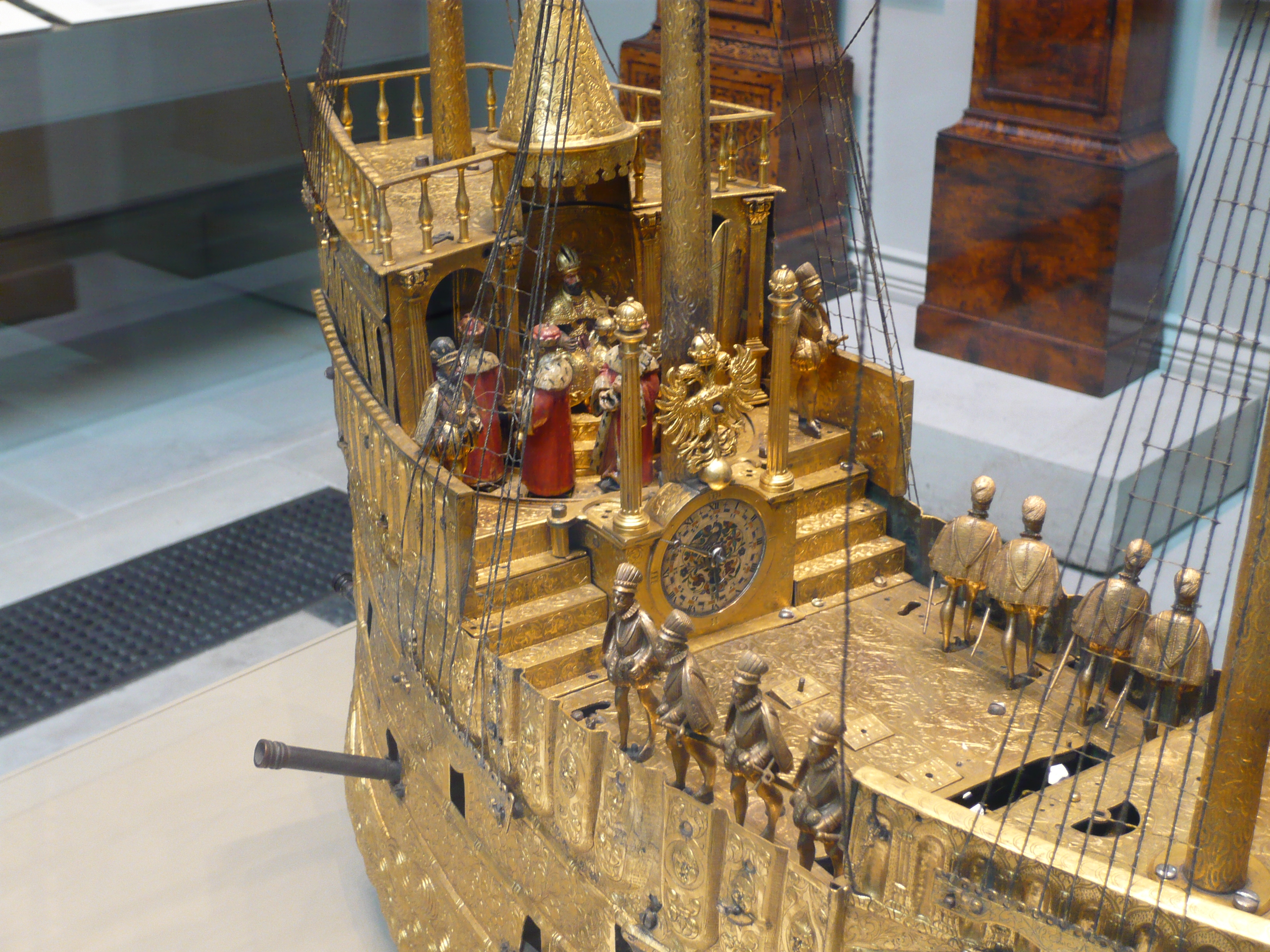
Detail showing the clock and the Holy Roman Emperor, with the six Electors moving around him. Mechanical Galleon (ship clock), c. 1585, British Museum.

The nef could be moved on wheels, which was usual; the wheels have now been removed. The hours and the quarter hours of the clock were struck using upside down bells in the crow's nests which were rung by hammers held by model seamen. There is a clock on the ship but it is small and almost lost in the detail at the base of the tallest mast. Mechanical music played accompanied by a drum on a skin hidden within the hull. Seven electors, including Augustus, Elector of Saxony, walk before the seated figure of the Rudolf II, the Holy Roman Emperor. The highly prestigious prince electors of the Holy Roman Empire decided who would be enthroned as the Holy Roman Emperor.

Finally the ship would make noises and smoke as the cannons fired and trumpets blared. It was fancied that the Mechanical Galleon "might have enlivened the dullest imperial banquets by racing along the table, guns blazing and trumpets blowing".

The complexity of this nef meant that Hans Schlottheim had to include three separate clockwork mechanisms. One conventionally powered the chiming clock, but also provided the power for the seven revolving electors. The music, including the drum, was powered by another motor and the third gave the ship movement. The mechanism was said to require rewinding every 24 hours.

One of Schlottheim's other masterpieces was a clock which at the twelfth hour presented a mechanical nativity scene. Joseph rocked Jesus's cradle followed by the approach of the Three Kings and the shepherds. The Madonna then bowed to welcome them. At this point angels moved up and down whilst God was revealed giving a benediction. This clock is thought to have been lost during World War II.

== Condition ==
In 2010, the Mechanical Galleon no longer functions. The drumskin that was used to drum as it rolled is no longer present, and the original wheels have been replaced with ball-shaped feet. The British Museum notes that the eight figures on deck are not the originals but casts taken from one original figure. However they also mention that they may have one of the figures, but are unsure as to whether it is from this nef. It is known that the figures on deck would have held drums and trumpets.

== Provenance ==
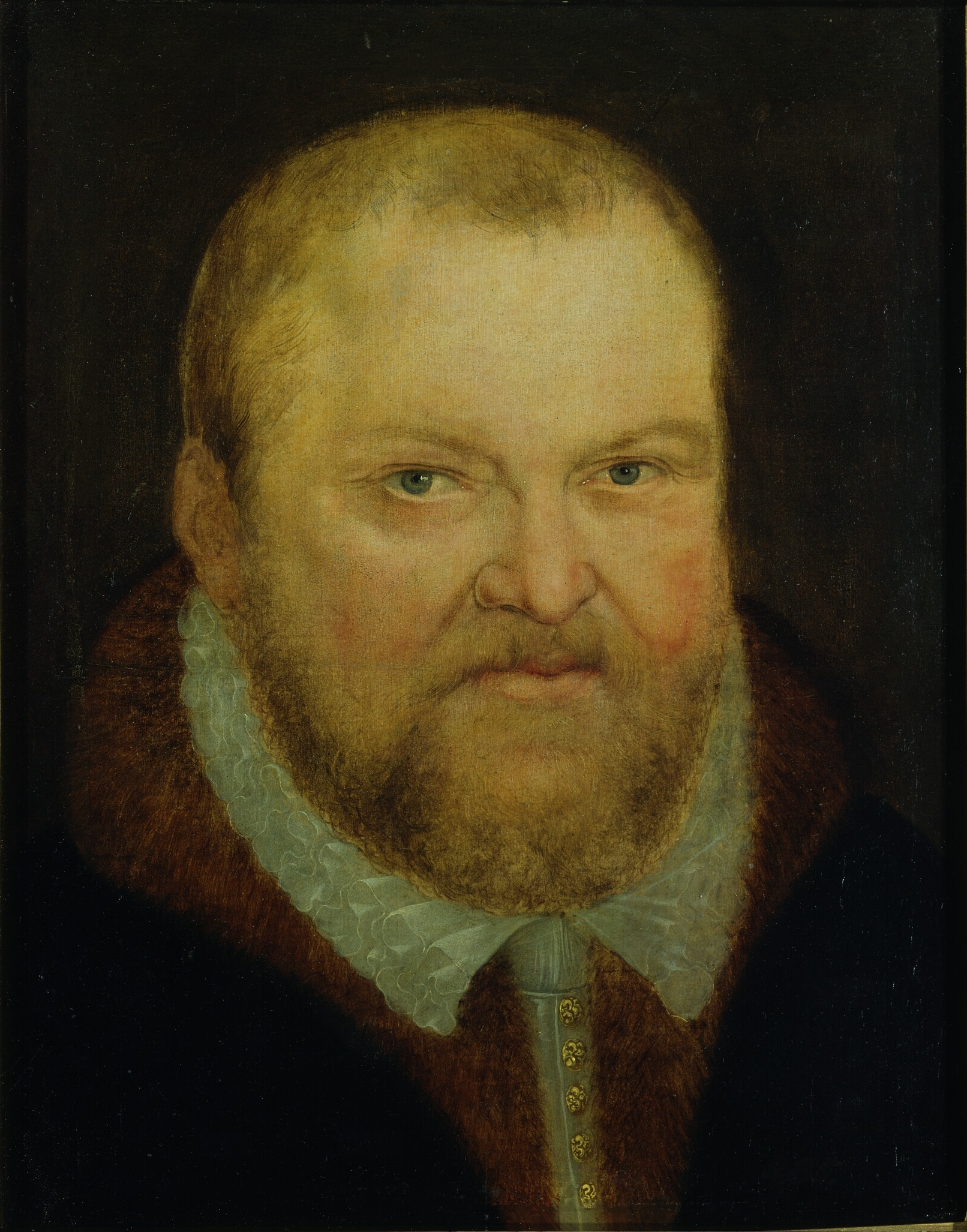
The Nef's owner: Augustus, Elector of Saxony

Octavius Morgan made a number of generous donations to the British Museum including this automaton in 1866. Historically, it is believed to be an artefact mentioned in an inventory of the Green Vault (Grünes Gewölbe) treasury of Augustus, Elector of Saxony of Dresden in 1585. It had been thought to have been owned by Rudolf II. The inventory records

"A gilded ship, skilfully made, with a quarter and full hour striking clock, which is to be wound every 24 hours. Above with three masts, in the crows' nests of which the sailors revolve and strike the quarters and hours with hammers on the bells. Inside, the Holy Roman Emperor sits on the Imperial throne, and in front of him pass the seven electors with heralds, paying homage as they receive their fiefs. Furthermore ten trumpeters and a kettle-drummer alternately announce the banquet. Also a drummer and three guardsmen, and sixteen small cannons, eleven of which may be loaded and fired automatically."

There are known to be two similar nefs by the same craftsman. The most similar is in the Musée de la Renaissance in Écouen, France. The Nef that did belong to Rudolf II is silver and is in the Kunsthistorisches Museum in Vienna.

== History of the World ==
This automaton was featured in the History of the World in 100 Objects, which was a series of radio programmes that started in 2010 and that were created in a partnership between the BBC and the British Museum. The leading figures in this partnership were Neil MacGregor and Mark Damazer. Damazer said

My absolute favourite so far is the 16th-century mechanical galleon. It is an extraordinary piece. It is tiny and its pieces move. Beyond its beauty, it tells a story about using patronage. All these early modern rulers competed with each other to make the best of this kind of object in order to show off their craftsmen. All I want is to take away the object and have it in my living room.

== Replica ==
The Museum Speelklok in Utrecht has a working replica of a shooting ship, including a real miniature cannon.

== Gallery ==
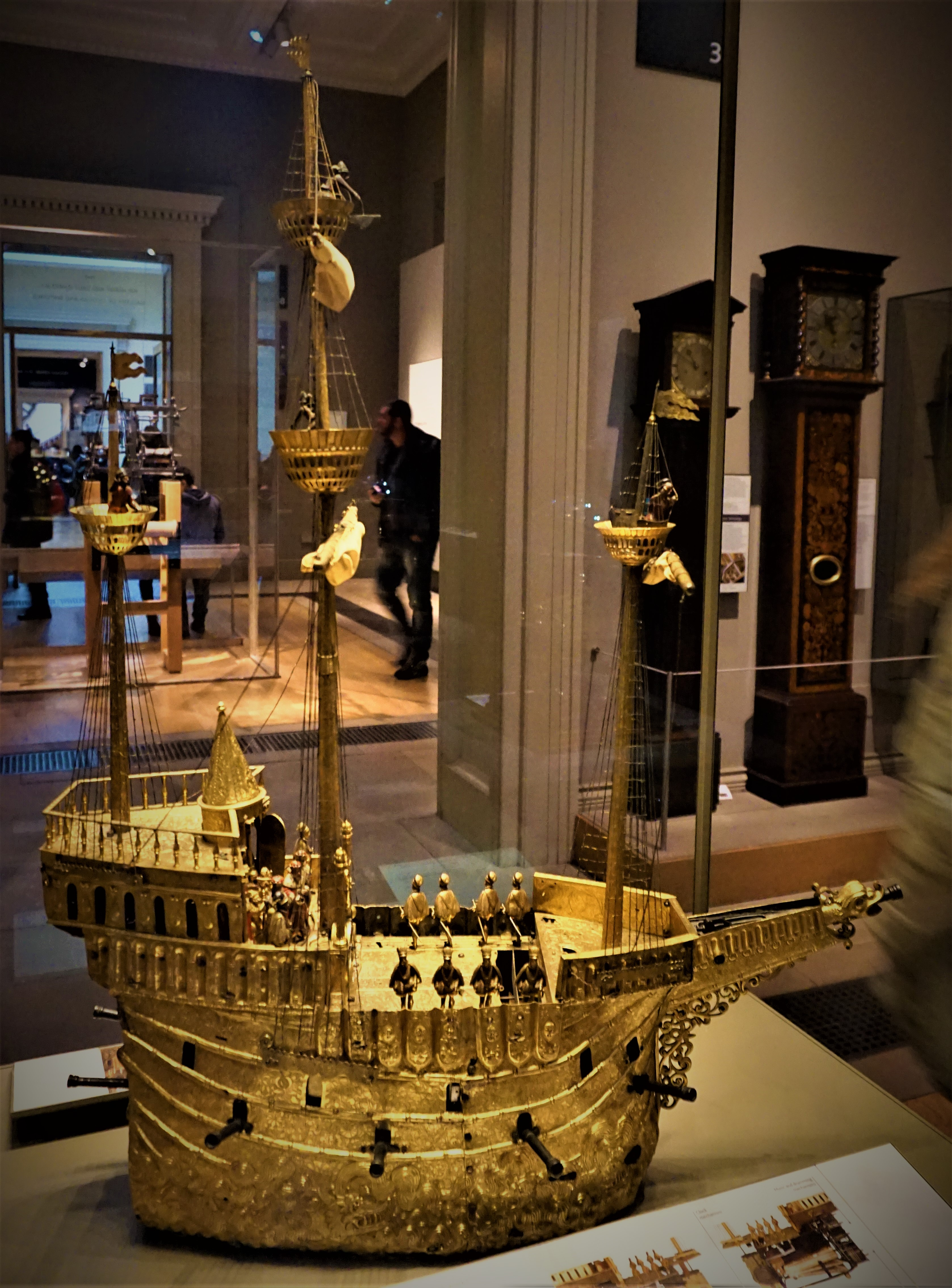
Galleon from the British Museum, Room 39, London.

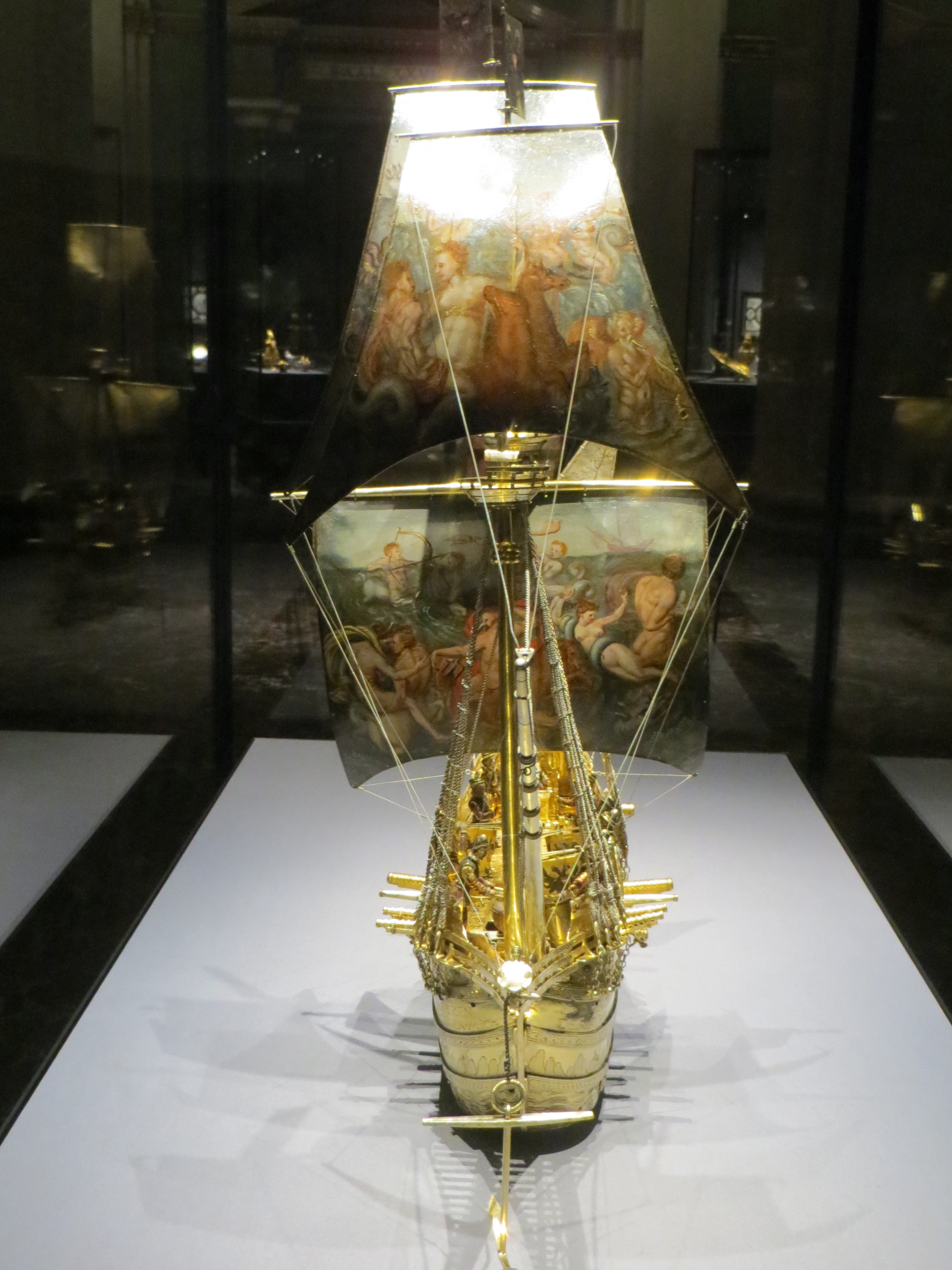
Galleon from the Kunsthistorisches Museum in Vienna

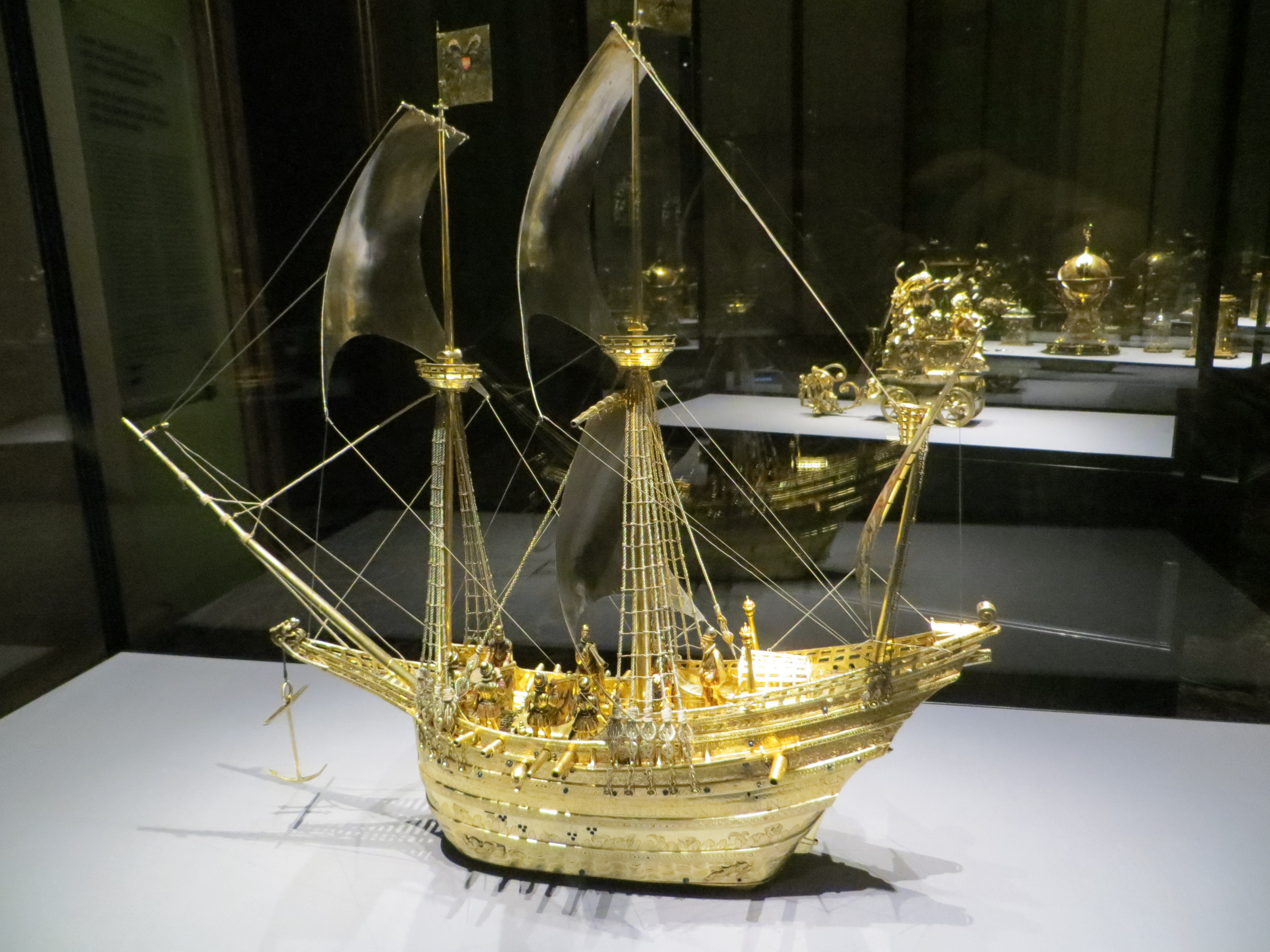
Side view of the KHM model

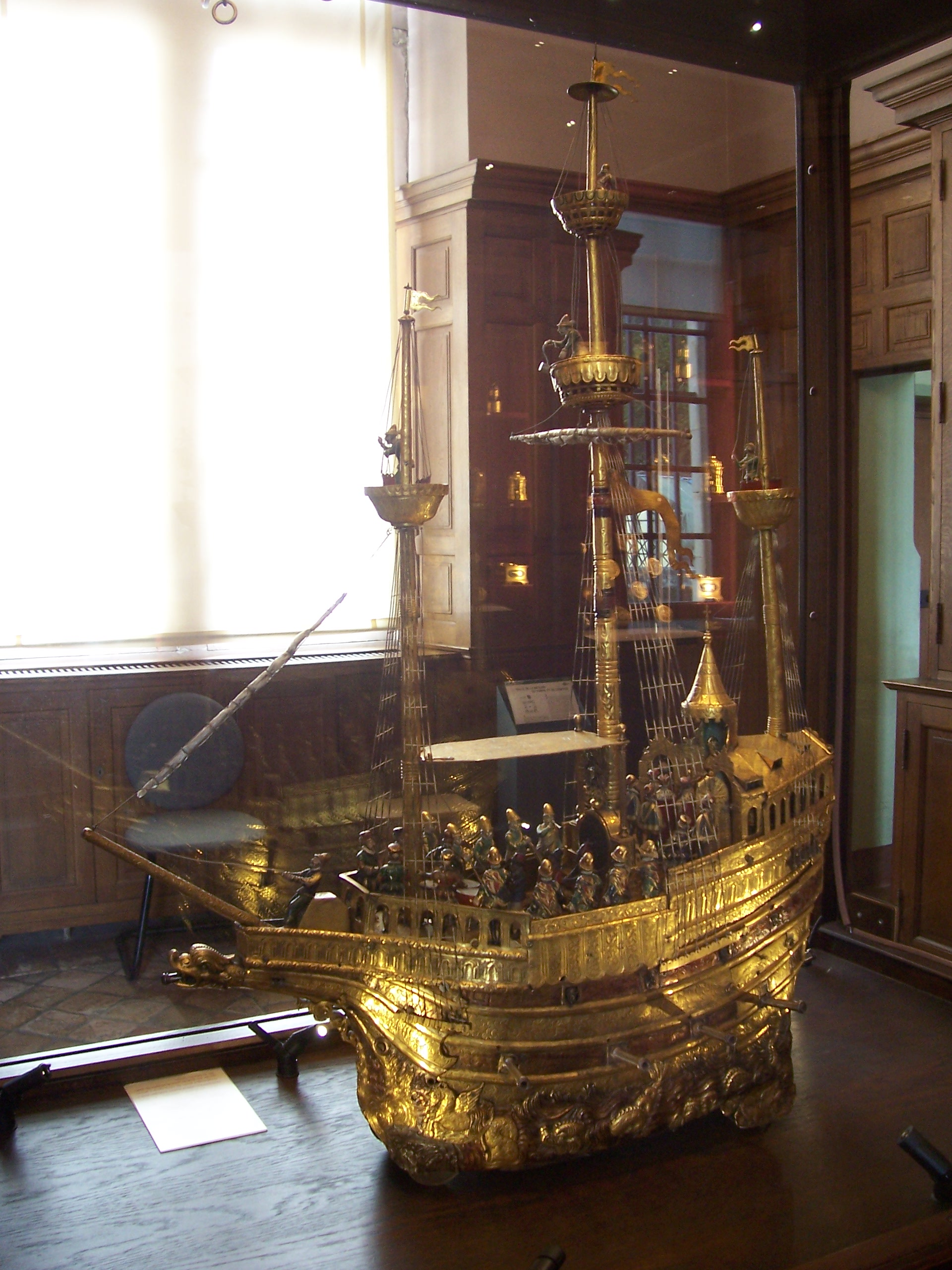
Galleon from the Château d'Écouen, north of Paris

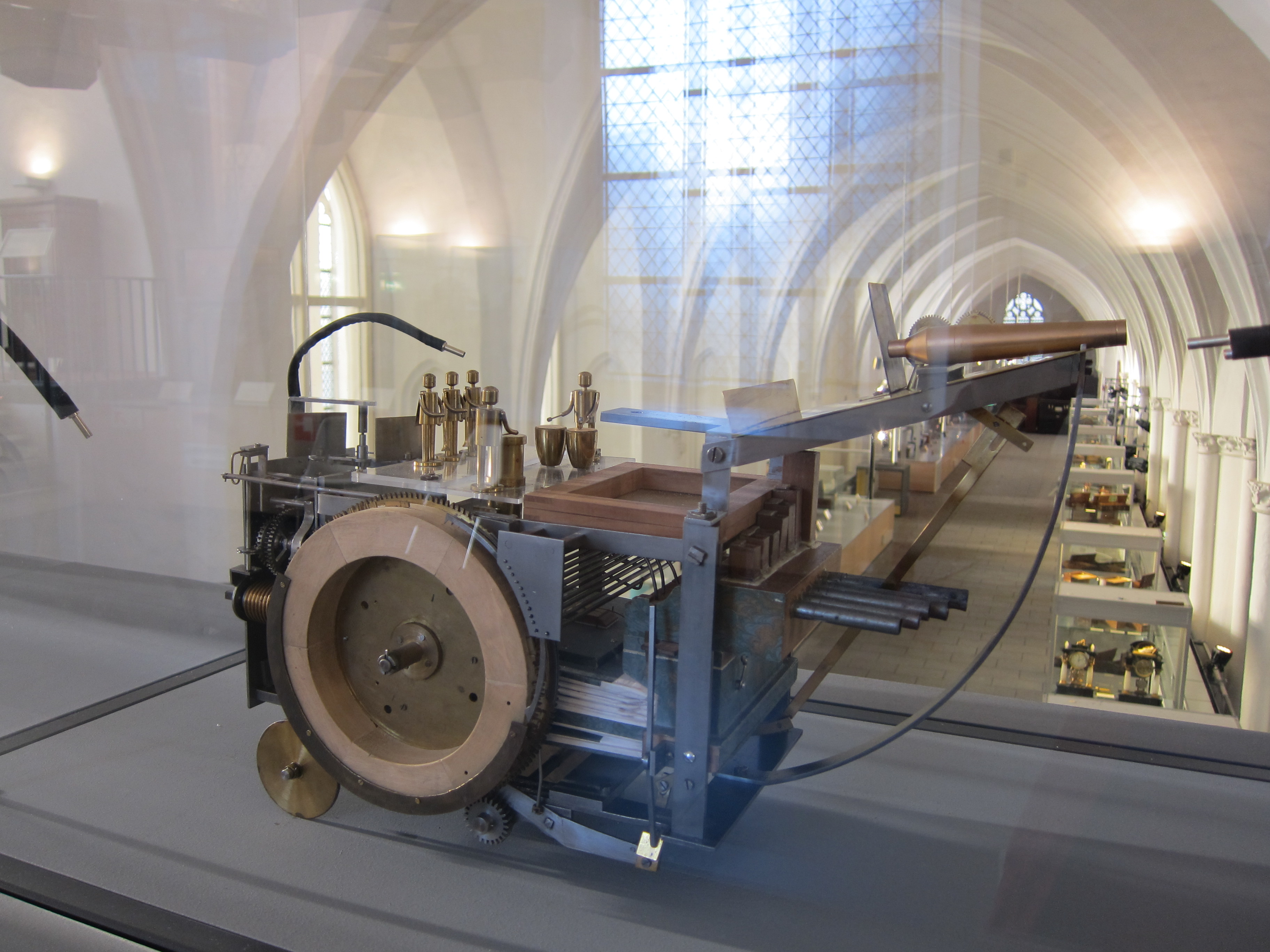
Working replica at Museum Speelklok in Utrecht

== Bibliography ==
- J. J. Haspels, Automatic musical instruments, (Nirota, Muziekdruk C.V., Koedijk, 1987)
- J. Fritsch (ed.), Ships of curiosity: three Rena (Paris, Réunion des Musées Nationaux, 2001)
- D. Roberts, Mystery, novelty and fantasy c (Atglen Pa., Schiffer Publishing, 1999)
- H. Tait, Clocks and watches (London, The British Museum Press, 1983)

Preceded by 75: Dürer's Rhinoceros	A History of the World in 100 Objects; Object 76	Succeeded by 77: Benin Bronzes
