= Abada (rhinoceros) =

Rhinoceros taken to Spain and Portugal in the 16th century

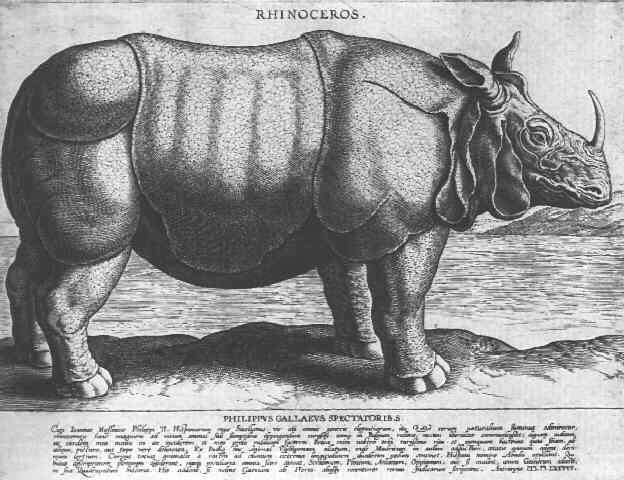
Abada depicted by Philippe Galle in 1586

Abada (before 1577–1588), also known as Bada or Ibada, was the name given to a female Indian rhinoceros kept by the Portuguese kings Sebastian I and Henry I from 1577 to 1580 and by Philip II of Spain from about 1580 to 1588. She was the first rhinoceros seen in Europe since the one sent as a present from the King of Portugal, Manuel I, to Pope Leo X in 1515, who died in a shipwreck off the coast of Italy in early 1516, immortalised as Dürer's Rhinoceros.

Abada was probably meant as a general term for the rhinoceros, as it derives from the Malay word (badak) for the animal and may have been in use in Spain and Portugal from around 1530, but since this was the only example of the species in Europe it served as a proper name as well. According to the dictionary of the Real Academia Española, abada is an alternative word for rhinoceros.

In 1577, the rhinoceros arrived at the port of Lisbon intended for the menagerie of Sebastian I of Portugal, probably as a gift from the viceroys of Portuguese India. As a safety measure the horn was removed (this later grew back, but seems to have been removed on a regular basis).

Sebastian was succeeded by Henry I the following year. On the death of Henry in 1580, Philip II of Spain claimed the throne, uniting the Spanish and Portuguese crowns, and inherited the rhinoceros whom he transferred to the menagerie of Casa de Campo, close to Madrid. On 16 October 1583 Philip transferred Abada once again, this time to the menagerie of El Escorial. The transfer did not take place without incident: one of the keepers decided to refresh the animal by dousing her with buckets of water, but the sudden soaking startled her and, in panic, she knocked down all her attendants. At El Escorial, Abada was put on display to the public and shown to the Japanese ambassadors in November 1584. Juan González de Mendoza mentions her in his book, China, in which he comments that the public were impressed by her thick hide and horn, and that there was speculation as to her being the unicorn of legend.

Philip used her to play a joke on the Hieronymite monks at El Escorial. In the autumn of 1584, he arranged first for an Indian elephant (whom he had also inherited from the Portuguese menagerie) to be driven up the steps and into the cells of the monks and the following week repeated the trick with the rhinoceros. While the elephant did not balk at the strange events, Abada was stubborn and complaining, grunted bad-temperedly, and refused to eat the food presented to her. At some point in her captivity she may have been blinded because the attendants had difficulty managing her and it was thought that this would make her less likely to attack them.

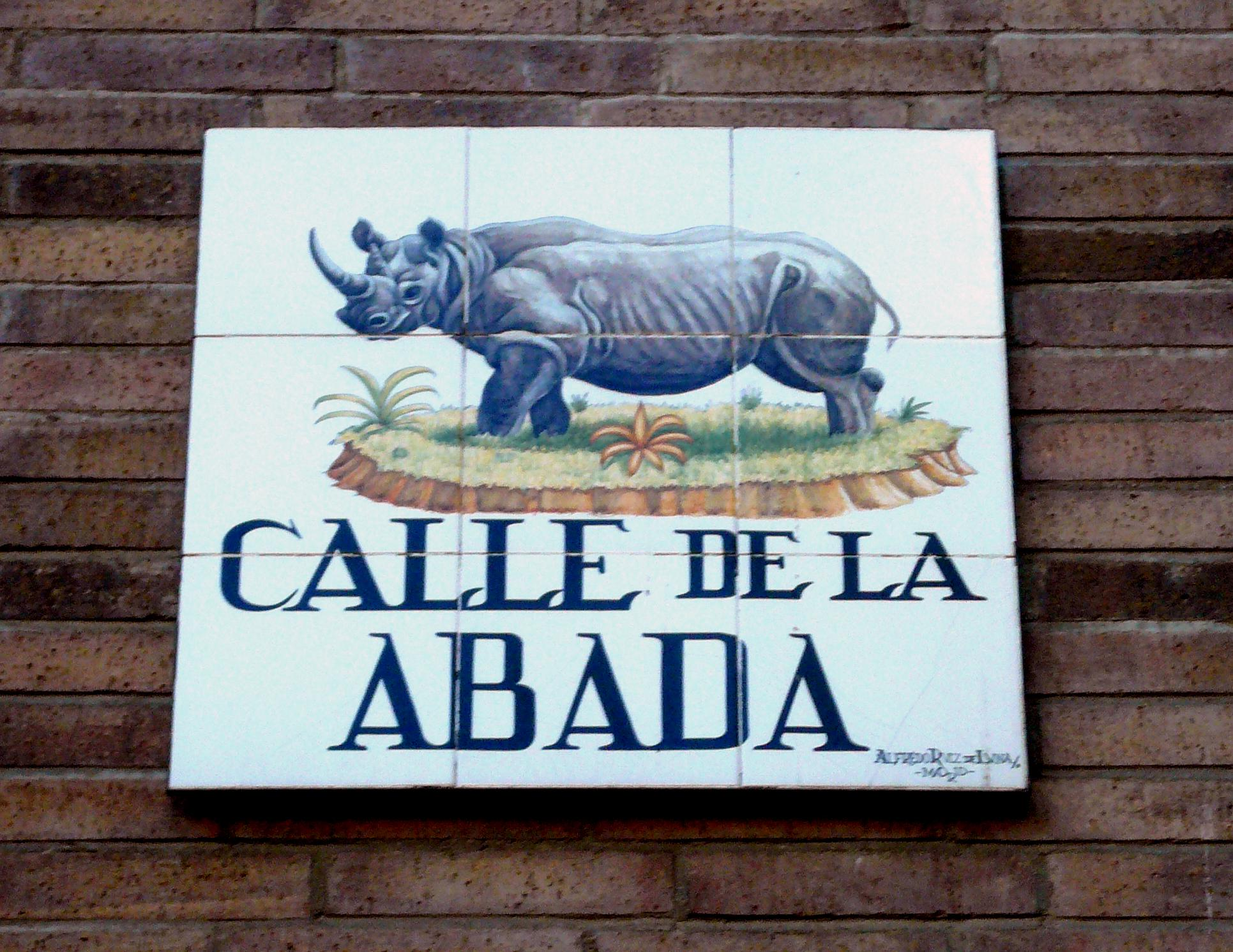
A street sign for Calle de la Abada, Madrid.

Abada appears to have died by 1588: Juan de Arphe y Villafañe included a description and print of a rhinoceros in his manual of decoration published in 1585, based on observations of Abada, rather than Dürer's picture, as it lacks the dorsal horn added by Dürer; she was still alive in 1586 when her image was captured in an engraving by Philippe Galle, and was seen by Pedro Páez the following year, but there is no record of her after 1587.

A street in Madrid, Calle de la Abada, close to the Puerta del Sol bears the name. Local legend has it that it was named after a sixteenth-century incident in the area in which a rhinoceros on display during a fair held on land owned by the San Martín Monastery killed a young boy and escaped to run through the city for several days before being caught. The prior of San Martin, Fray Pedro de Guevara, had a cross erected in memory of the boy. Years later, when the priory sold the land for houses to be built, a street was given the name Abada.
