= Dürer's Rhinoceros =

Woodcut by Albrecht Dürer

The Rhinoceros
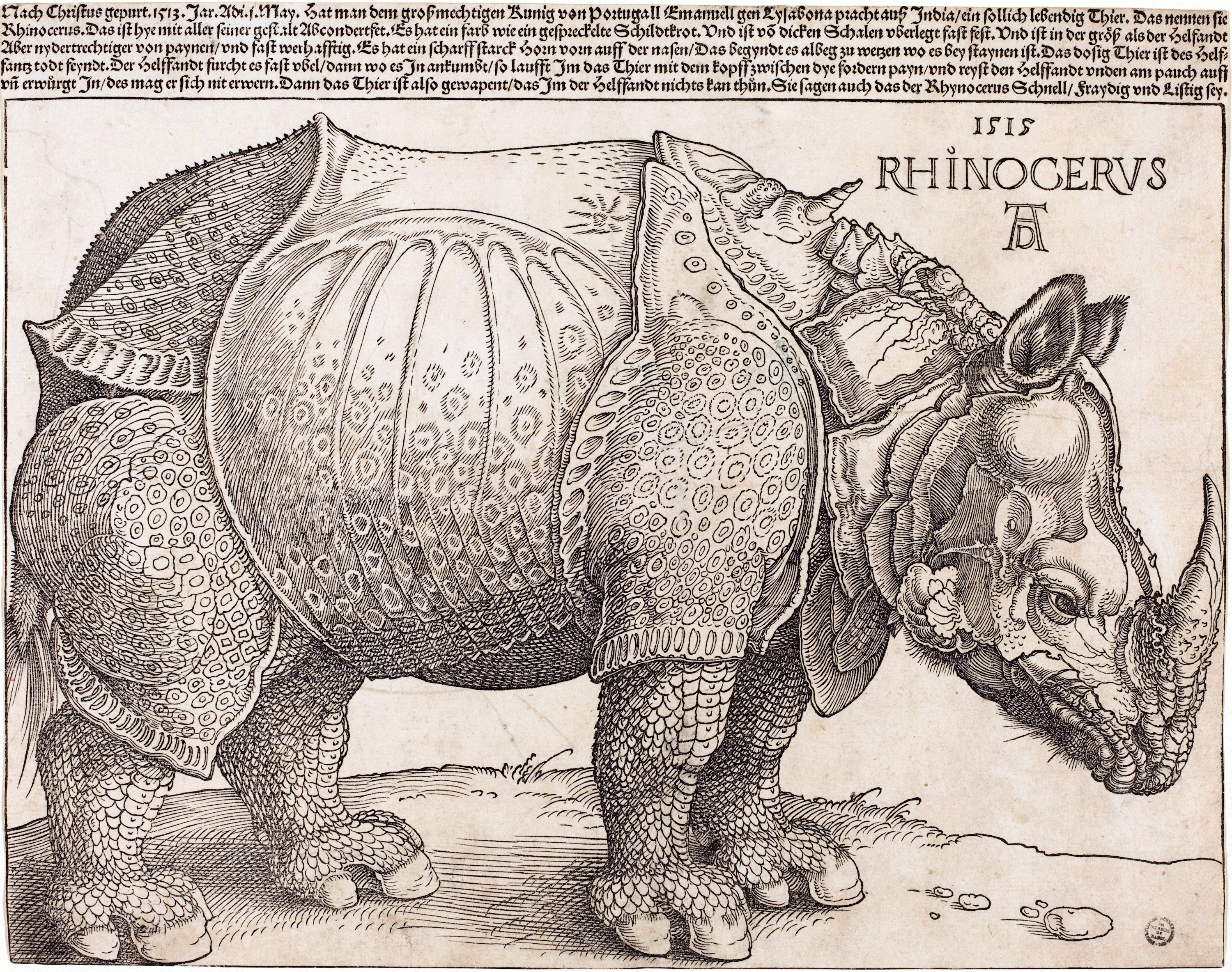
- Artist: Albrecht Dürer
- Year: 1515
- Type: Woodcut
- Dimensions: 23.5 cm × 29.8 cm (9.3 in × 11.7 in)
- Location: This impression, National Gallery of Art, Washington, DC

Dürer's Rhinoceros is the name commonly given to a woodcut executed by German artist Albrecht Dürer in 1515. (Note: Some sources erroneously say 1513, copying a typographical error made by Dürer in one of his original drawings and perpetuated in his woodcut.) Dürer never saw the actual rhinoceros, which was the first living example seen in Europe since Roman times. Instead the image is based on an anonymous written description and brief sketch of an Indian rhinoceros brought to Lisbon in 1515. Later that year, the King of Portugal, Manuel I, sent the animal as a gift for Pope Leo X, but it died in a shipwreck off the coast of Italy. Another live rhinoceros was not seen again in Europe until Abada arrived from India to the court of Sebastian of Portugal in 1577.

Dürer's woodcut is not entirely an accurate representation. It depicts a rhinoceros with hard plates that cover its body like sheets of armor, with a gorget at the throat, a solid-looking breastplate, and what appear to be rivets along the seams; there is a small twisted horn on its back, scaly legs and saw-like rear quarters. None of these features are present in a real rhinoceros, although the Indian rhinoceros does have deep folds in its skin that can look like armor from a distance.

Dürer's woodcut became very popular in Europe and was copied many times in the following three centuries. It was regarded as a true representation of a rhinoceros into the late 18th century, and it has been said of Dürer's woodcut that "probably no animal picture has exerted such a profound influence on the arts". Eventually, it was supplanted by more realistic drawings and paintings, particularly those of Clara the rhinoceros, who toured Europe in the 1740s and 1750s.

== The rhinoceros ==
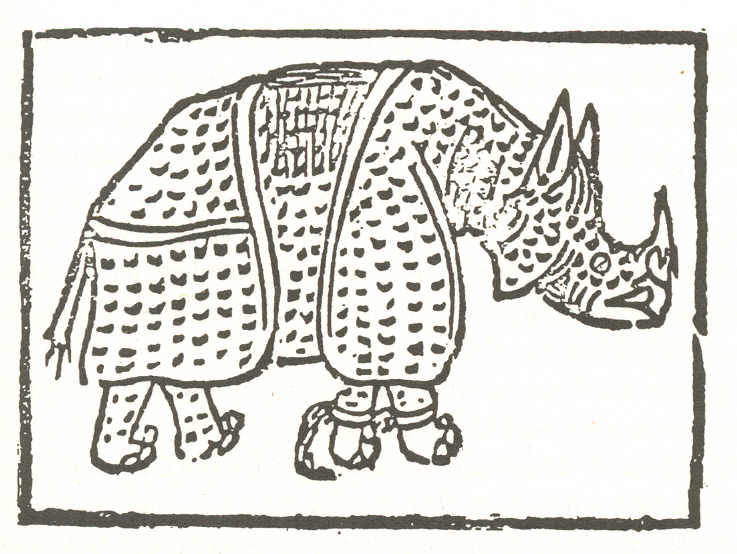
The first known print of the rhinoceros is a rather primitive woodcut which illustrates a poem by Giovanni Giacomo Penni published in Rome in July 1515. (Biblioteca Colombina, Seville).

On 20 May 1515, an Indian rhinoceros named Ulysses arrived in Lisbon from the Far East. In early 1514, Afonso de Albuquerque, governor of Portuguese India, sent ambassadors to Sultan Muzaffar Shah II, ruler of Cambay (modern Gujarat), to seek permission to build a fort on the island of Diu. The mission returned without an agreement, but diplomatic gifts were exchanged, including the rhinoceros. At that time, the rulers of different countries would occasionally send each other exotic animals to be kept in a menagerie. The rhinoceros was already well accustomed to being kept in captivity. Albuquerque decided to forward the gift, known by its Gujarati name of Genda or Ganda as Durer noted it (in the lower margin of the original drawing now held at the British Museum), and its Indian keeper, named Ocem, to King Manuel I of Portugal. It sailed on the Nossa Senhora da Ajuda, which left Goa in January 1515. The ship and its two companion vessels were loaded with exotic spices, sailed across the Indian Ocean, around the Cape of Good Hope and north through the Atlantic, stopping briefly in Mozambique, Saint Helena and the Azores.

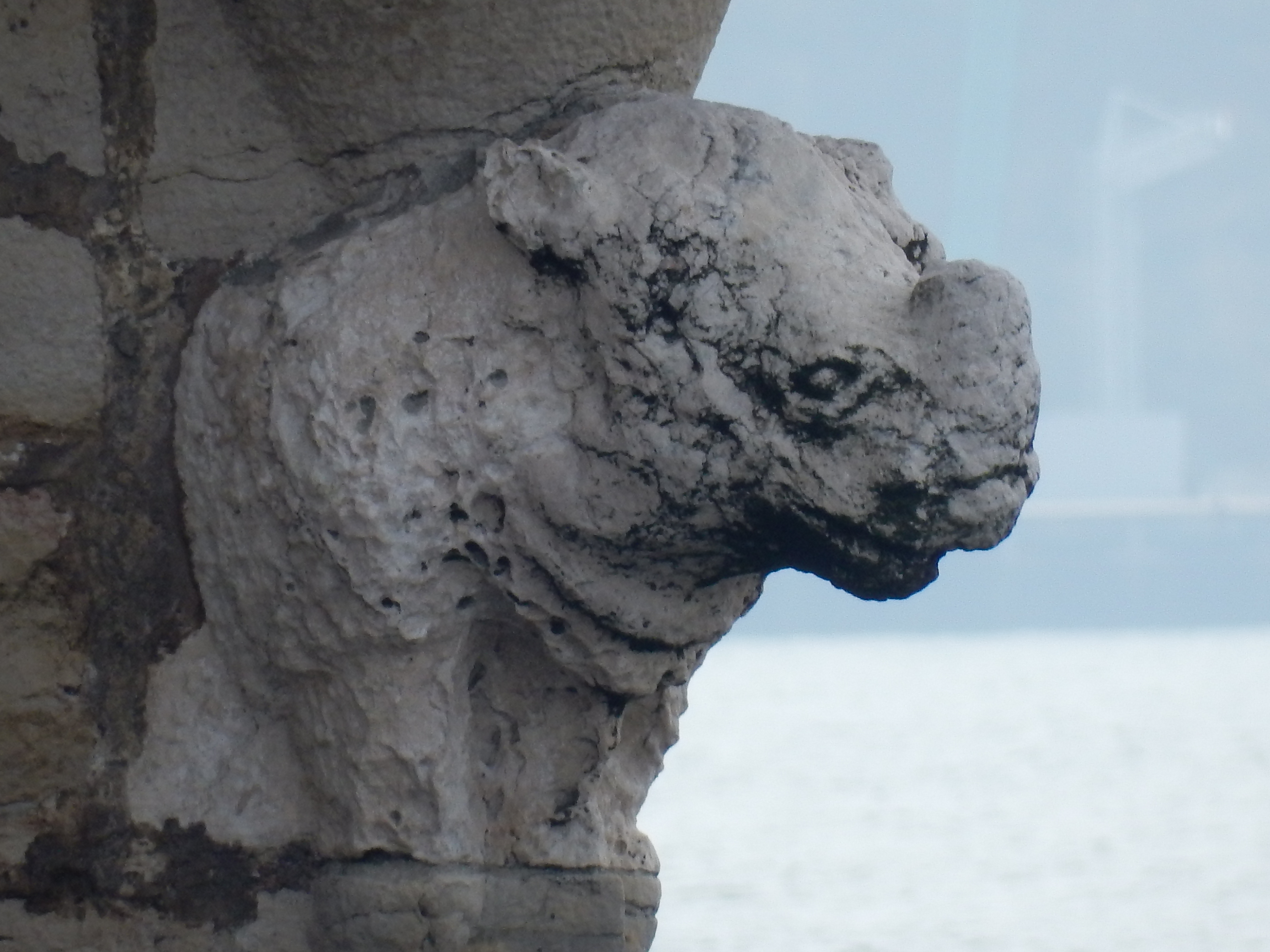
Decoration at the Belém Tower

After a relatively fast voyage of 120 days, the rhinoceros was finally unloaded in Portugal, near the site where the Manueline Belém Tower was under construction. The tower was later decorated with gargoyles shaped as rhinoceros heads under its corbels. A rhinoceros had not been seen in Europe since Roman times, twelve centuries prior: and was examined by scholars and the curious, and letters describing the fantastic creature were sent to correspondents throughout Europe. The earliest known image of the animal illustrates a poemetto by Florentine Giovanni Giacomo Penni, published in Rome on 13 July 1515, fewer than eight weeks after its arrival in Lisbon.

It was housed in King Manuel's menagerie at the Ribeira Palace in Lisbon, separate from his elephants and other large beasts at the Estaus Palace. Manuel arranged a fight with a young elephant from his collection, to test the account by Pliny the Elder that the elephant and the rhinoceros are bitter enemies, but the elephant fled the field in panic before a single blow was struck.

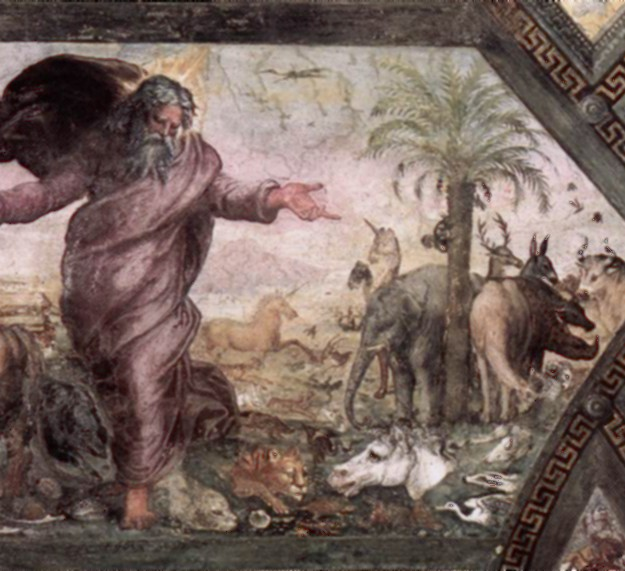
"Creation of the animals" by Raphael, 1518–1519, a fresco on the second floor of the Palazzi Pontifici in the Vatican. A rhinoceros appears to the right of the tree, with an elephant [possibly Hanno] to the left.

Manuel decided to give the rhinoceros as a gift to the Medici Pope Leo X. The King was keen to curry favour with the Pope, to maintain the papal grants of exclusive possession to the new lands that his naval forces had been exploring in the Far East since Vasco da Gama discovered the sea route to India around Africa in 1498. The previous year, the Pope had been very pleased with Manuel's gift of a white elephant, also from India, which the Pope had named Hanno. Together with other precious gifts of silver plate and spices, the rhinoceros, with its new collar of green velvet decorated with flowers, embarked in December 1515 for the voyage from the Tagus to Rome.

After resuming its journey, the ship was wrecked in a sudden storm as it passed through the narrows of Porto Venere, north of La Spezia on the coast of Liguria. The rhinoceros, chained and shackled to the deck to keep it under control, was unable to swim to safety and drowned. The carcass of the rhinoceros was recovered near Villefranche, and its hide was returned to Lisbon, where it was stuffed. Some reports say that the mounted skin was sent to Rome, arriving in February 1516, to be exhibited impagliato (Italian for "stuffed with straw"), although such a feat would have challenged 16th-century methods of taxidermy, which were still primitive. If a stuffed rhinoceros did arrive in Rome, its fate remains unknown: it might have been removed to Florence by the Medici or destroyed in the 1527 sack of Rome. In any event, there was not the popular sensation in Rome that the living beast had caused in Lisbon, although a rhinoceros was depicted in contemporary paintings in Rome by Giovanni da Udine and Raphael.

== Dürer's woodcut ==
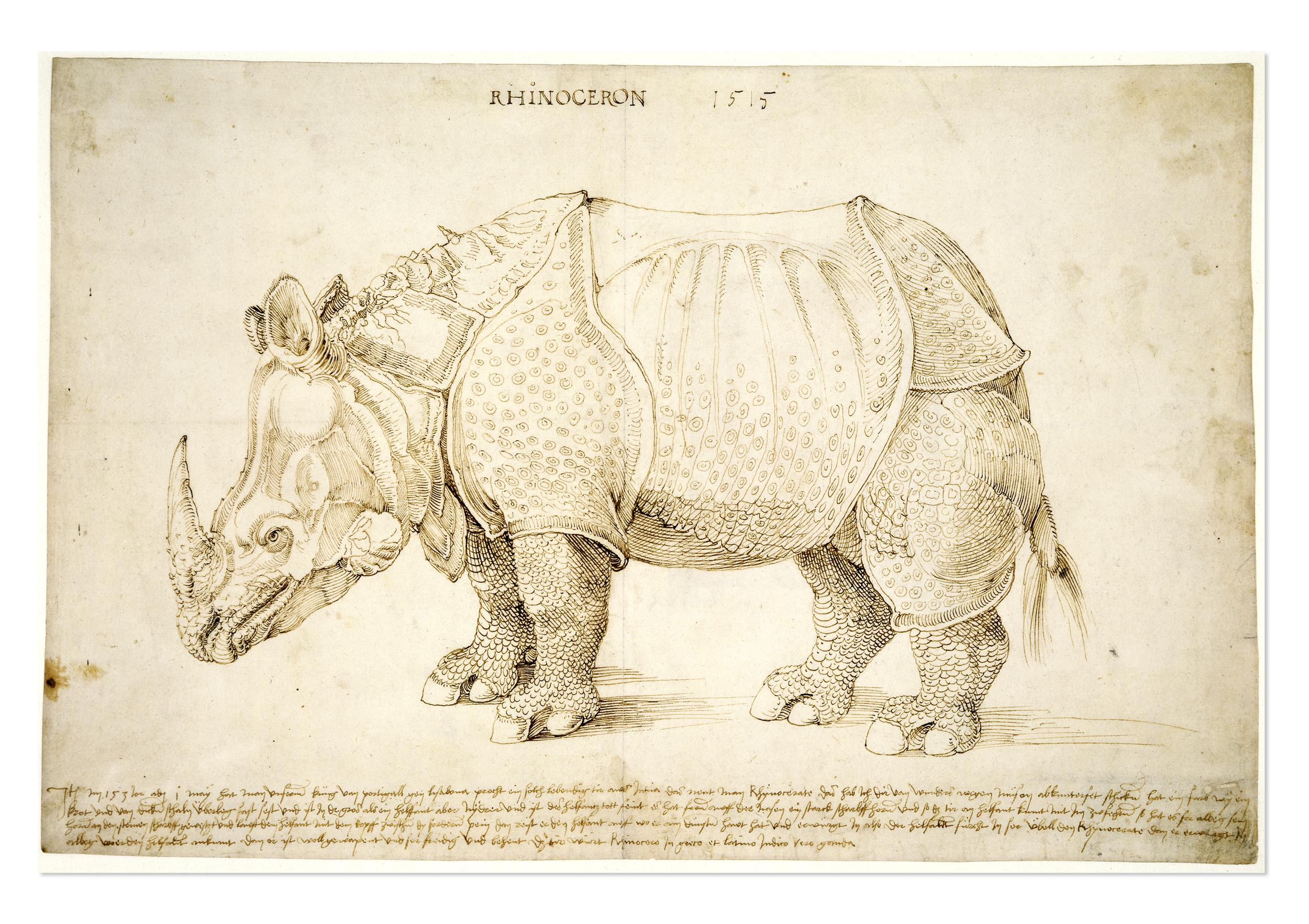
Preparatory study for the rhinoceros print by Albrecht Dürer, 1515 (British Museum: SL,5218.161 ). The inscription bears an incorrect date (1513) for the arrival of the rhinoceros in Lisbon, which actually occurred in 1515.

Valentim Fernandes, a Moravian merchant and printer, saw the rhinoceros in Lisbon shortly after it arrived and described it in a newsletter sent to the Nuremberg community of merchants in June 1515. The original document in German has not survived, but a transcript in Italian is held in the Biblioteca Nazionale Centrale in Florence. A second letter of unknown authorship was sent from Lisbon to Nuremberg at around the same time, enclosing a sketch by an unknown artist. Dürer – who was acquainted with the Portuguese community of the factory at Antwerp – saw the second letter and sketch in Nuremberg. He made a pen and ink drawing (Note: One later acquired by Sir Hans Sloane and now held by the British Museum.) and printed a reversed reflection of it. (Note: The woodcut was cut on the block by a specialist craftsman known as a Formschneider, for Dürer's approval. This may well have been Hieronymus Andreae, who Dürer was using on other projects at this time, especially those with inscriptions.)

The German inscription on the woodcut is largely drawing from Pliny's account and reads:

On the first of May in the year 1513 AD [sic], the powerful King of Portugal, Manuel of Lisbon, brought such a living animal from India, called the rhinoceros. This is an accurate representation. It is the colour of a speckled tortoise, (Note: Some versions translate Krot as "toad", but Schildkrot most likely refers to a tortoise.) and is almost entirely covered with thick scales. It is the size of an elephant but has shorter legs and is almost invulnerable. It has a strong pointed horn on the tip of its nose, which it sharpens on stones. It is the mortal enemy of the elephant. The elephant is afraid of the rhinoceros, for, when they meet, the rhinoceros charges with its head between its front legs and rips open the elephant's stomach, against which the elephant is unable to defend itself. The rhinoceros is so well-armed that the elephant cannot harm it. They also say that the rhinoceros is fast, merry and jovial.

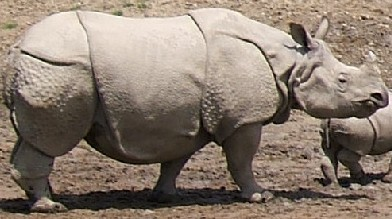
The folds of skin of an Indian rhinoceros match up well to the plates of armour depicted by Dürer.

Dürer's woodcut is not an accurate representation of a rhinoceros. He depicts an animal with hard plates that cover its body like sheets of armour, with a gorget at the throat, a solid-looking breastplate, and rivets along the seams. He places a small twisted horn on its back and gives it scaly legs and saw-like rear quarters. None of these features is present in a real rhinoceros. Glynis Ridley suggested that it is possible that a suit of armour was forged for the rhinoceros's fight against the elephant in Portugal and that the features depicted by Dürer are parts of the armour, however, there is no mention of this in Bedini. Alternatively, Dürer's "armour" may represent the heavy folds of thick skin of an Indian rhinoceros, or, as with the other inaccuracies, may simply be misunderstandings or creative additions by Dürer. (Note: Dürer was living near the armourer's quarter in Nuremberg, Schmeidegasse, and was designing armour at about the same time; this aspect may, therefore, be a creative conceit.) Dürer also draws a scaly texture over the body of the animal, including the "armour". This may be Dürer's attempt to reflect the rough and almost hairless hide of the Indian rhinoceros, which has wart-like bumps covering its upper legs and shoulders. On the other hand, his depiction of the texture may represent dermatitis induced by the rhinoceros' close confinement during the four-month journey by ship from India to Portugal.

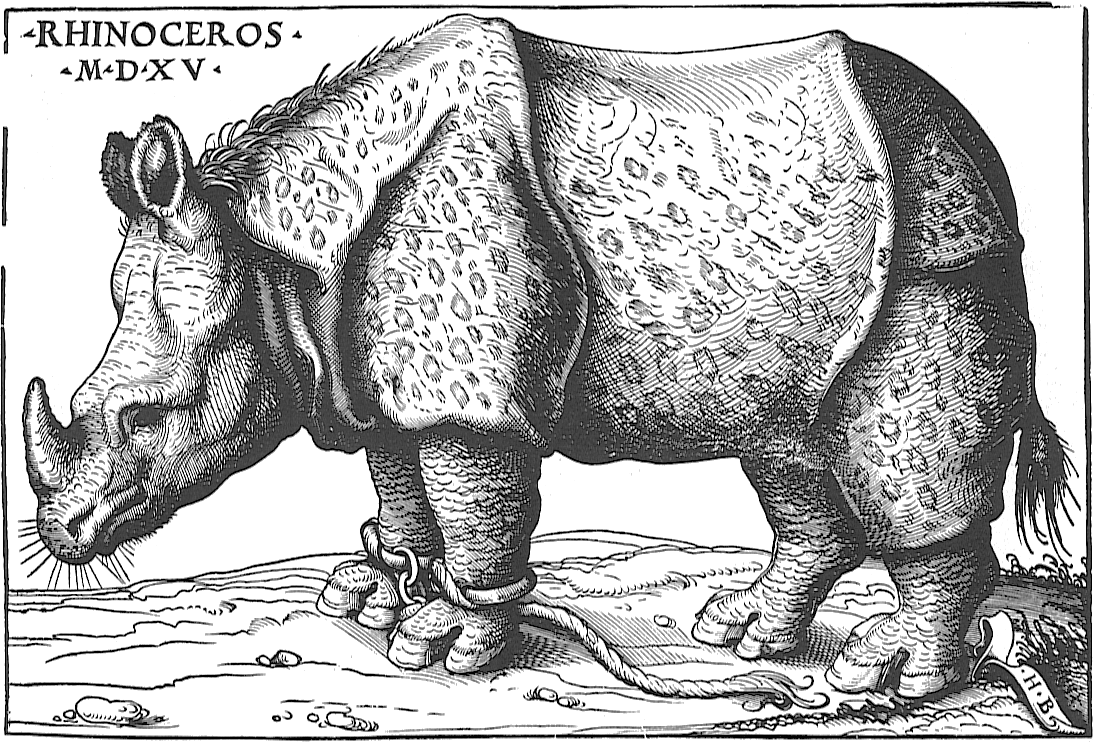
Unique surviving impression of Hans Burgkmair's 1515 woodcut copy, in the Graphische Sammlung Albertina, Vienna

A second woodcut was executed by Hans Burgkmair in Augsburg around the same time as Dürer's. Burgkmair corresponded with merchants in Lisbon and Nuremberg, but it is not clear whether he had access to a letter or sketch as Dürer did, perhaps even Dürer's sources, or saw the animal himself in Portugal. His image is truer to life, omitting Dürer's more fanciful additions and including the shackles and chain used to restrain the rhinoceros. However, Dürer's woodcut is more powerful and eclipsed Burgkmair's in popularity. Only one impression (example) of Burgkmair's image has survived, whereas Dürer's print survives in many impressions. Dürer produced a first edition of his woodcut in 1515. Many further printings followed after Dürer's death in 1528, including two in the 1540s, and two more in the late 16th century.

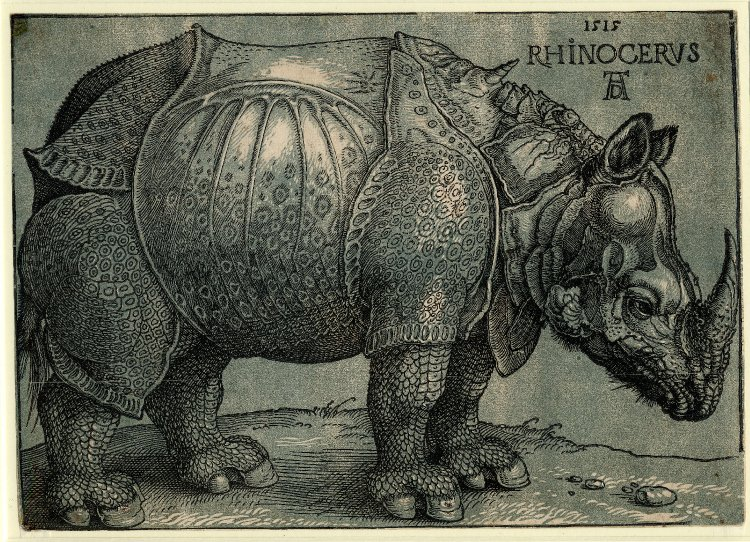
Janssen's chiaroscuro woodcut

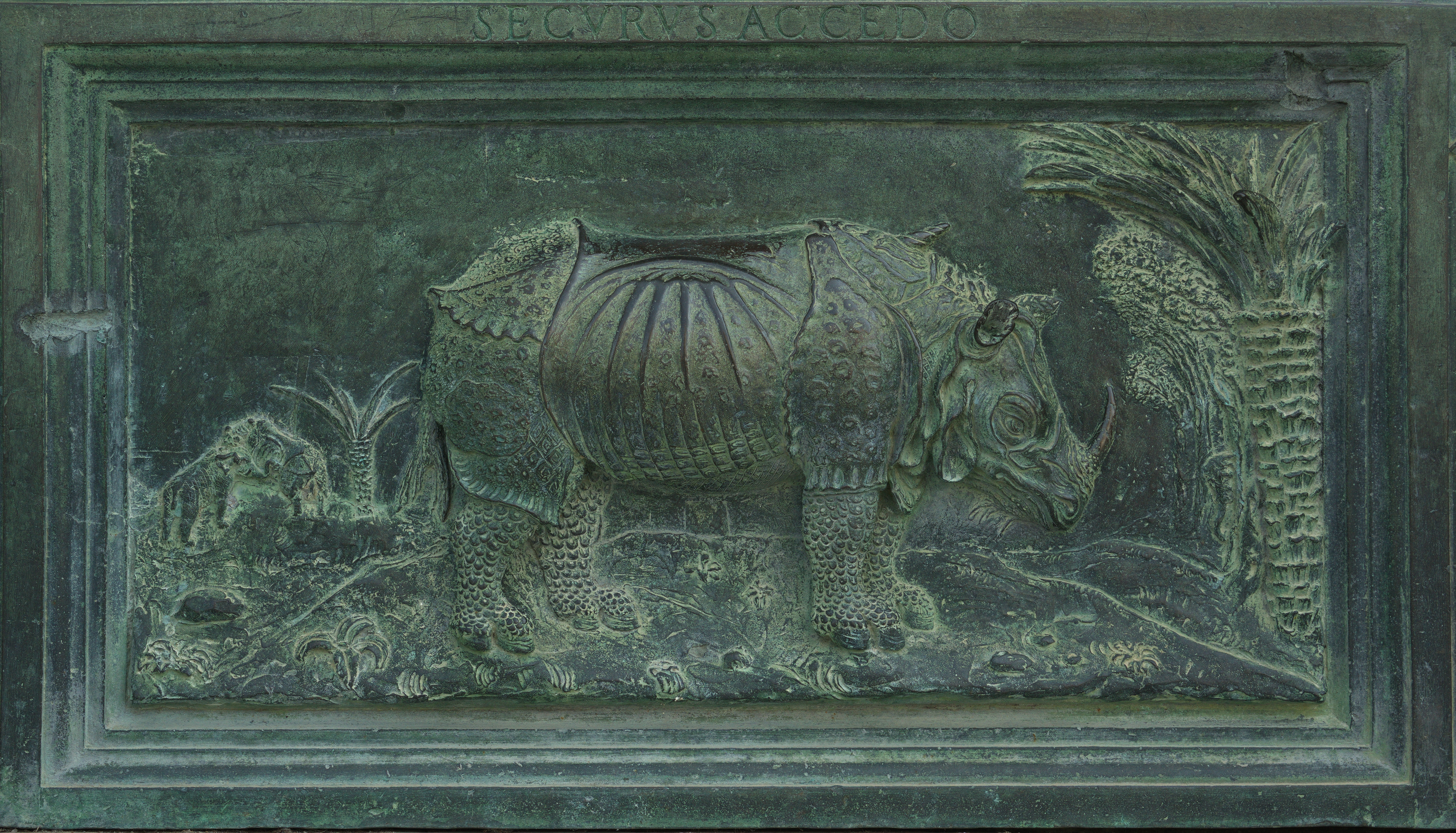
Pisa Cathedral, central door, lowest panel of left wing, School of Giambologna, c. 1602

The block passed into the hands of the Amsterdam printer and cartographer Willem Janssen (also called Willem Blaeu amongst other names). By this time the block was very damaged; the border lines were chipped, there were numerous woodworm holes and a pronounced crack had developed through the rhino's legs. Janssen decided to re-issue the block with the addition of a new tone block printed in a variety of colours, olive-green and dark green, as well as blue-grey. The resulting chiaroscuro woodcut, which entirely omitted the text, was published after 1620. There is an example in the British Museum. This was the seventh of the eight editions in all of the print.

Despite its errors, the image remained very popular, and was regarded as an accurate representation of a rhinoceros until the late 18th century. Dürer may have anticipated this and deliberately chosen to create a woodcut, rather than a more refined and detailed engraving, as this was cheaper to produce and more copies could be printed. A rhinoceros clearly based on Dürer's woodcut was chosen by Alessandro de' Medici as his emblem in June 1536, with the motto "Non vuelvo sin vencer" (old Spanish for "I shall not return without victory"). A sculpture of a rhinoceros based on Dürer's image was placed at the base of a 70-foot (21 m) high obelisk designed by Jean Goujon and erected in front of the Church of the Sepulchre in the rue Saint-Denis in Paris in 1549 for the royal entry welcoming the arrival of the new King of France, Henry II.

A similar rhinoceros, in relief, decorates a panel in one of the bronze west doors of Pisa Cathedral. The rhinoceros was depicted in numerous other paintings and sculptures and became a popular decoration for porcelain. The popularity of the inaccurate Dürer image remained undiminished despite an Indian rhinoceros spending eight years in Madrid from 1580 to 1588 (although a few examples of a print of the Madrid rhinoceros sketched by Philippe Galle in Antwerp in 1586, and derivative works, have survived), and the exhibition of a live rhinoceros in London a century later, from 1684 to 1686, and of a second individual after 1739.

The pre-eminent position of Dürer's image and its derivatives declined from the mid 18th century when more live rhinoceroses were brought to Europe, shown to the curious public, and depicted in more accurate representations. Jean-Baptiste Oudry painted a life-size portrait of Clara the rhinoceros in 1749, and George Stubbs painted a large portrait of a rhinoceros in London around 1790. Both of these paintings were more accurate than Dürer's woodcut, and a more realistic conception of the rhinoceros gradually started to displace Dürer's image in the public imagination. In particular, Oudry's painting was the inspiration for a plate in Buffon's encyclopedic Histoire naturelle, which was widely copied. In 1790, James Bruce's travelogue Travels to discover the source of the Nile dismissed Dürer's work as "wonderfully ill-executed in all its parts" and "the origin of all the monstrous forms under which that animal has been painted, ever since". Even so, Bruce's own illustration of the African white rhinoceros, which is noticeably different in appearance to the Indian rhinoceros, still shares conspicuous inaccuracies with Dürer's work.

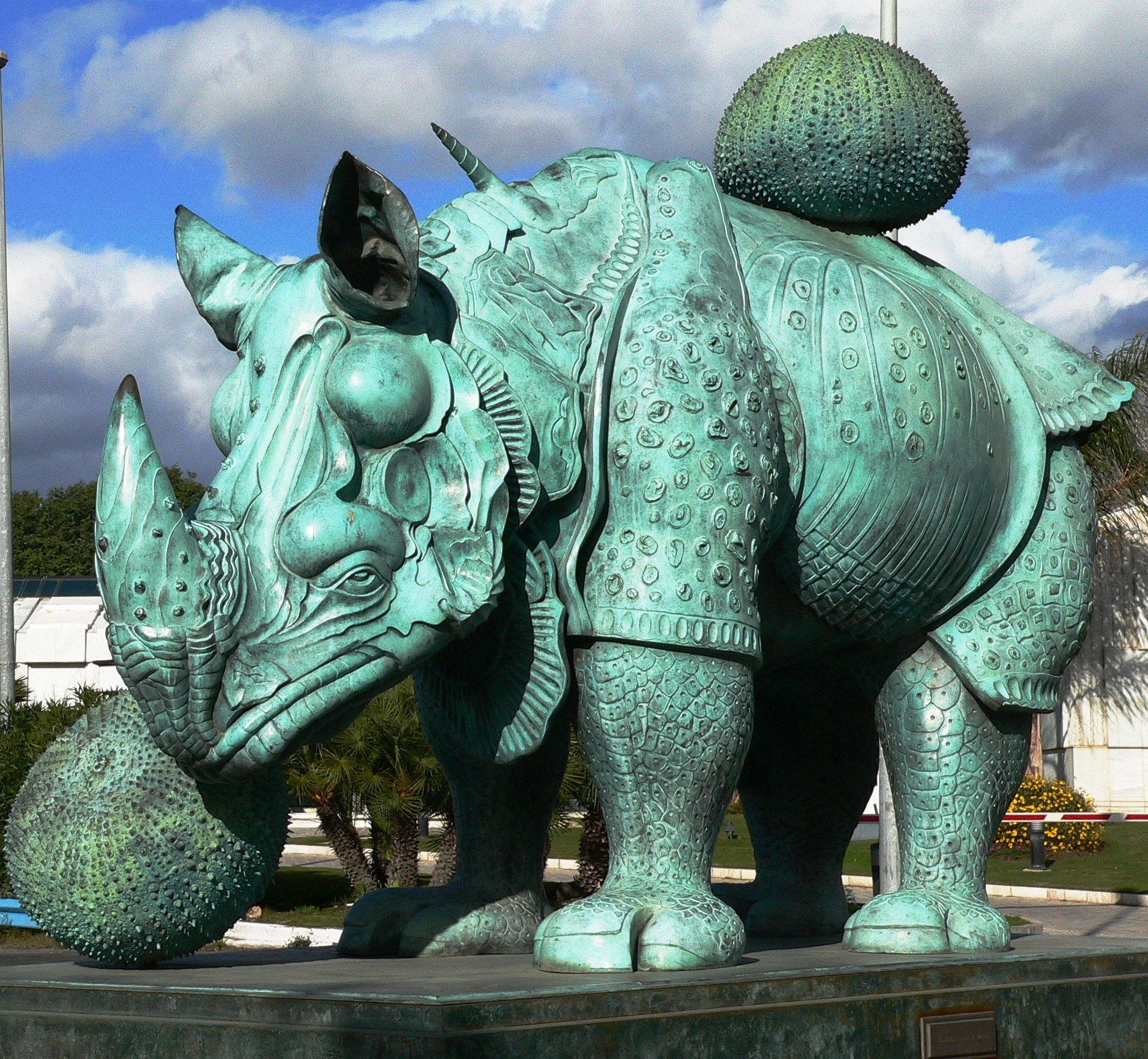
Rinoceronte vestido con puntillas (1956) by Salvador Dalí in Puerto Banús, Marbella, Spain

The semiotician Umberto Eco argues (fetching the idea from E.H. Gombrich, Art and Illusion: A Study in the Psychology of Pictorial Representation, 1961) that Dürer's "scales and imbricated plates" became a necessary element of depicting the animal, even to those who might know better, because "they knew that only these conventionalized graphic signs could denote «rhinoceros» to the person interpreting the iconic sign." He also notes that the skin of a rhinoceros is rougher than it visually appears and that such plates and scales portray this non-visual information to a degree.

Until the late 1930s, Dürer's image appeared in school textbooks in Germany as a faithful image of the rhinoceros; and it remains a powerful artistic influence. It was one of the inspirations for Salvador Dalí; a reproduction of the woodcut hung in his childhood home and he used the image in several of his works.

== Sale history ==
Although very popular, few prints have survived and impressions of the first edition are rare. A fine example was sold at Christie's New York in 2013 for $866,500, setting a new auction record for the artist.

== See also ==
- List of engravings by Albrecht Dürer
- List of woodcuts by Albrecht Dürer

Preceded by 74: Jade dragon cup	A History of the World in 100 Objects; Object 75	Succeeded by 76: Mechanical Galleon
