= Schlüsselfelder Ship =

16th century ornamental container

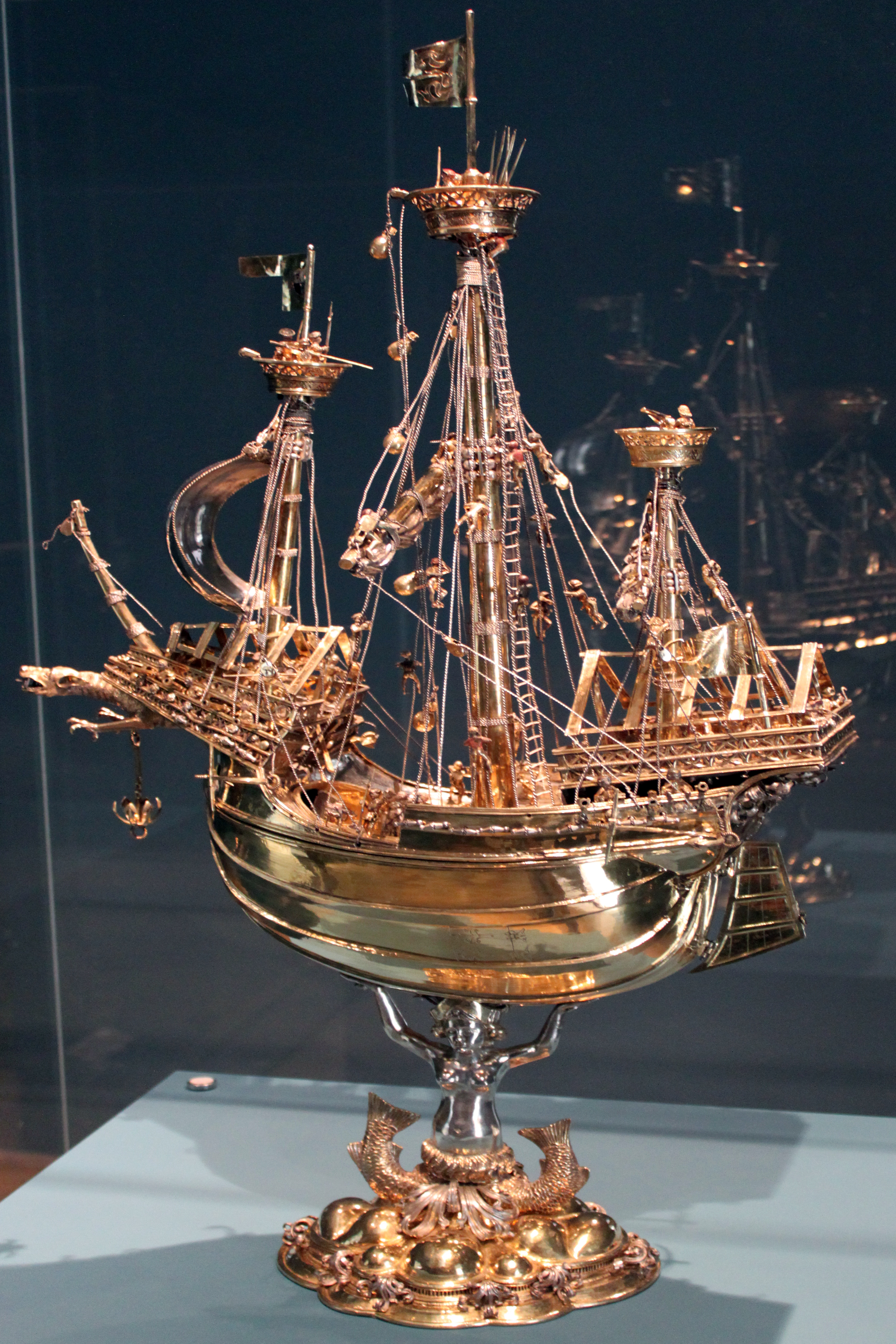
Schlüsselfelder Ship

The Schlüsselfelder Ship (German: Schlüsselfelder Schiff) is a nef or table centrepiece in the form of a model ship, in this case a work of the German Renaissance about 1503. The carrack was made of silver-gilt in Nuremberg, Germany, possibly by Albrecht Dürer the Elder, at the request of the patrician Wilhelm Schlüsselfelder. It is displayed in the Germanisches Nationalmuseum in Nuremberg.
