= Nef (metalwork) =

Medieval ornamental metalwork container

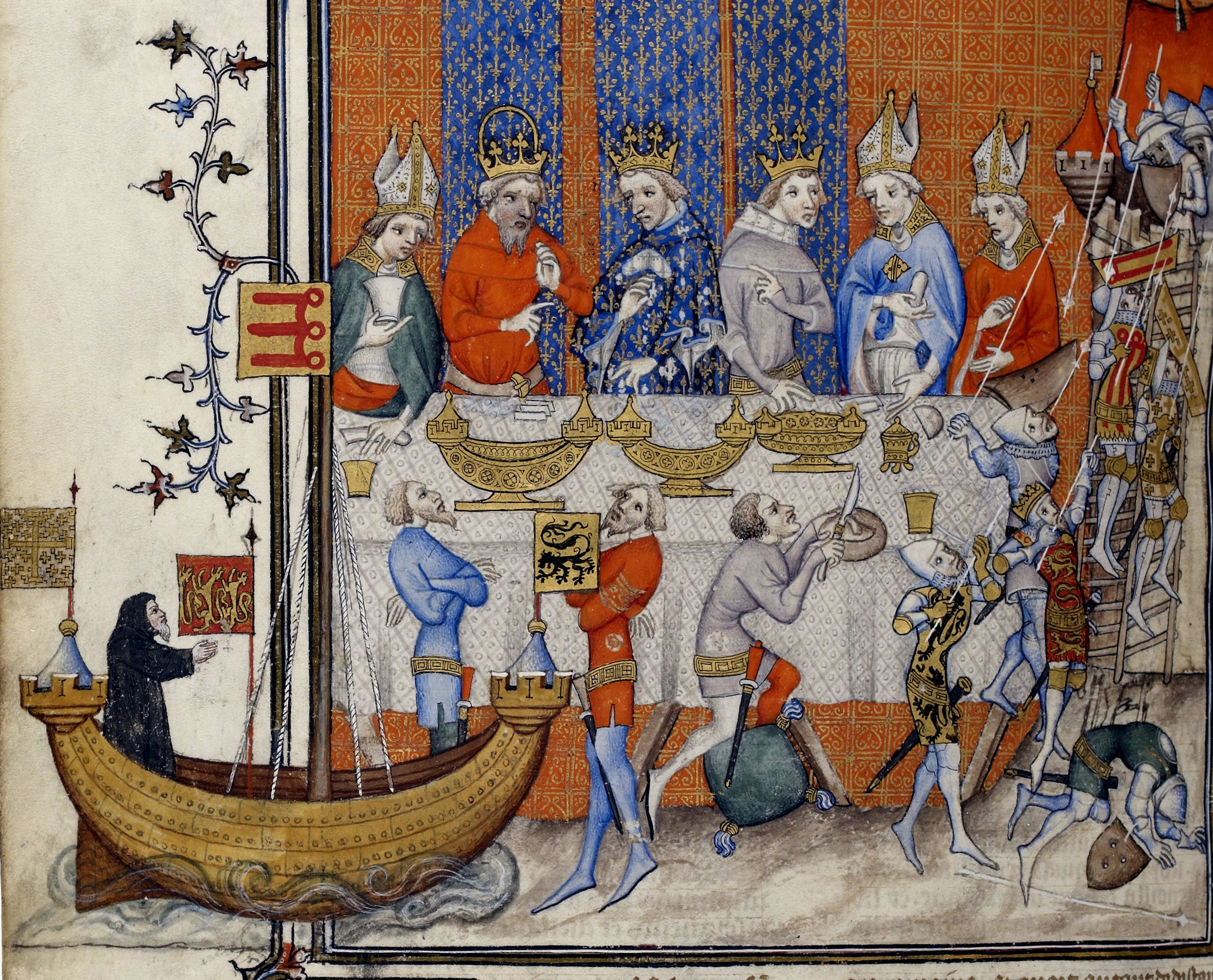
Three nefs on the table as Charles V of France hosts Charles IV, Holy Roman Emperor and his son Wenceslaus IV of Bohemia in 1378. They are watching a floor-show re-enacting the taking of Jerusalem.

A nef is an extravagant table ornament and container used in the Middle Ages and Renaissance, made of precious metals in the shape of a ship – nef was another word for a carrack in French. If not just used for decoration, it could hold salt or spices (the latter being very expensive in the Middle Ages), or cutlery, or even napkins. The large nef depicted in the well-known calendar miniature for January from the Très Riches Heures du Duc de Berry is being used to hold, and perhaps wash, gilt dishes from the table service.

Nefs are recorded in France as early as 1239, initially consisting of just the hull, and perhaps initially used to drink from; by the 14th century the most elaborate had masts, sails and even crew, and had become too crowded with such details to be used as containers for anything. The so-called Mechanical Galleon in the British Museum is a late 16th-century German nef which was also a clock and automaton, with moving figures and music.

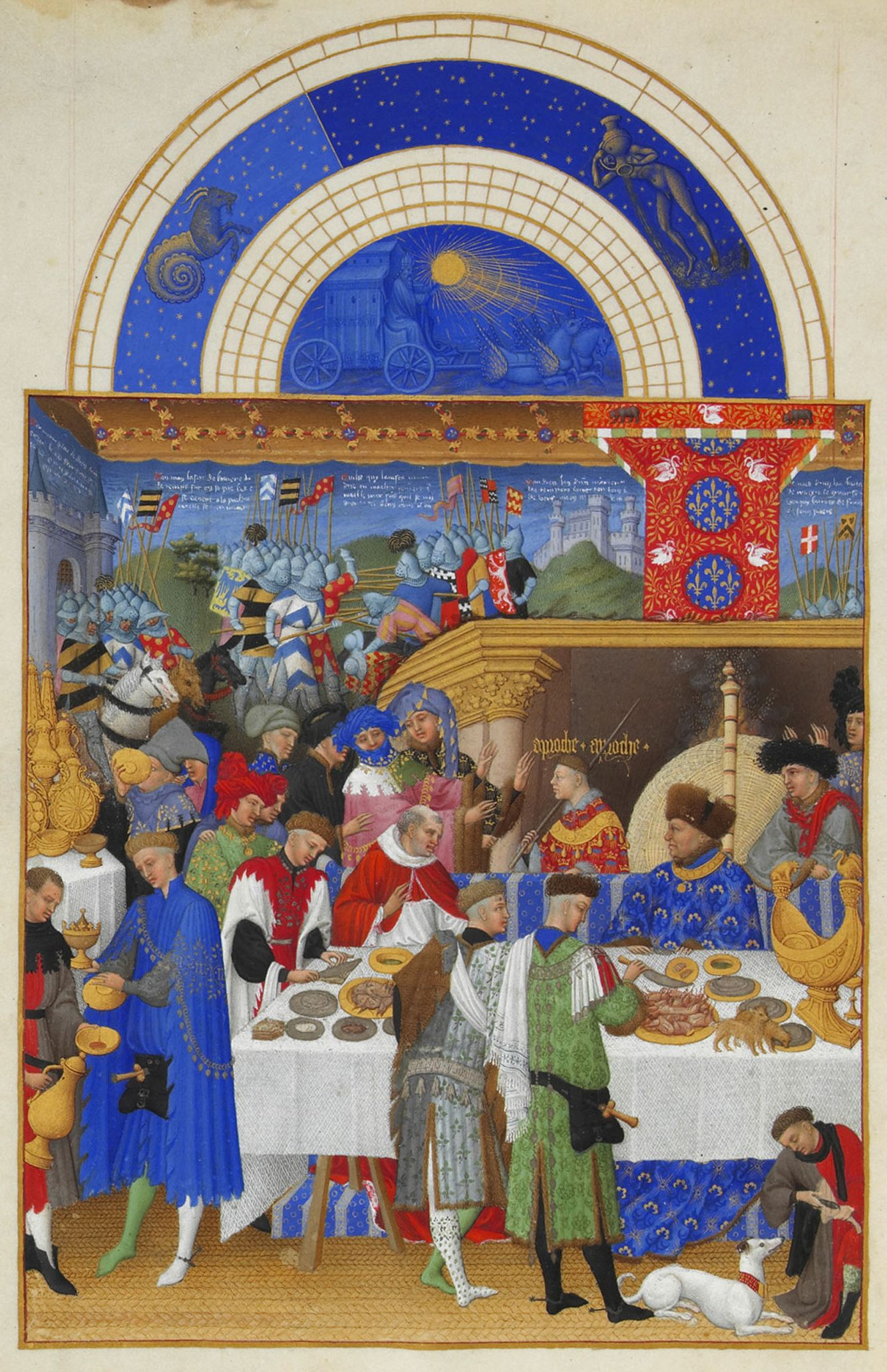
Calendar miniature for January from the Très Riches Heures du Duc de Berry

A nef was usually made of silver, silver-gilt or gold, often further embellished with enamel and jewels. A nautilus shell often formed the hull of the ship, as in the Burghley Nef (illustrated). Some nefs had wheels to allow them to be rolled from one end of the table to the other, but most had legs or pedestals. The nef was placed in front of the most important person at table as a mark of their status.

The equivalent in religious plate is a navicula, Latin for small ship, and also a term in English for a boat-shaped incense-holder.

== Gallery of decorative nefs ==
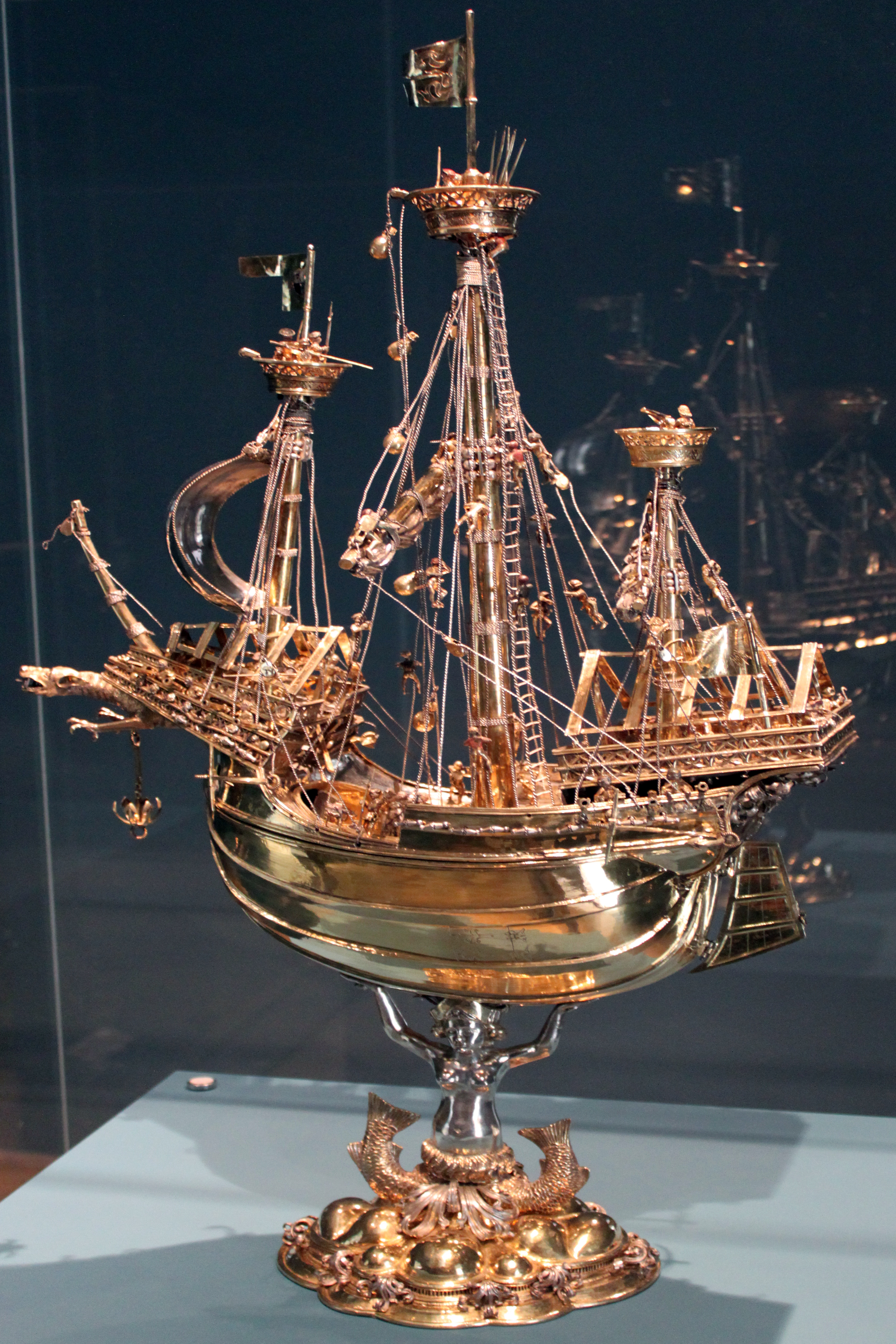
Schlüsselfelder Ship, Germany c. 1503

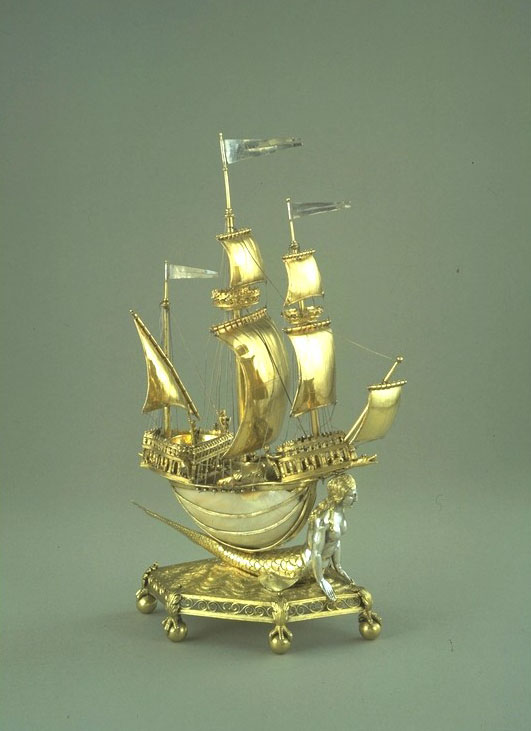
The Burghley Nef, silver-gilt (with sections ungilded), and nautilus shell, 1527–28, France, V&A Museum

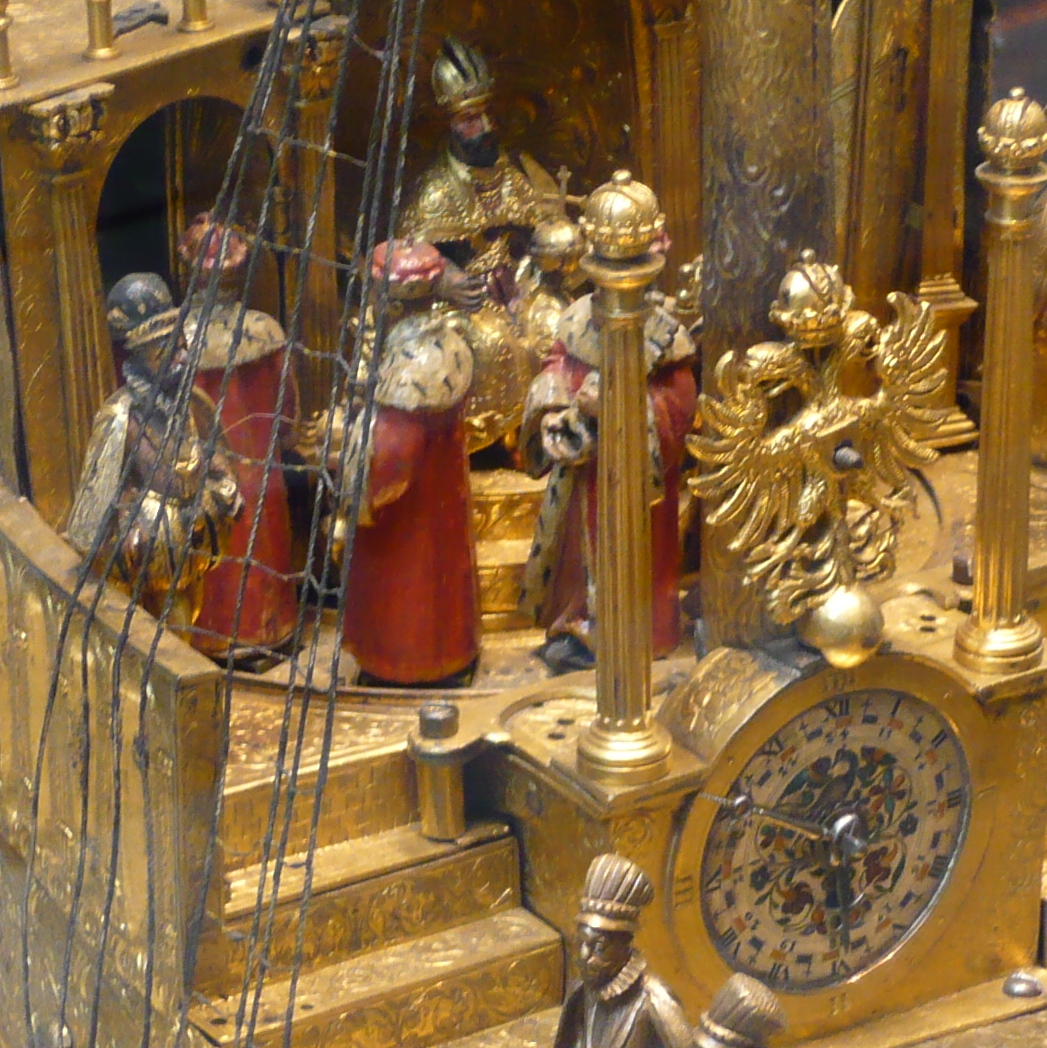
Detail from the so-called Mechanical Galleon in the British Museum, Germany c. 1585

== See also ==
- Schlüsselfelder Ship
