= Giovanni Giacomo Penni =

Italian physician

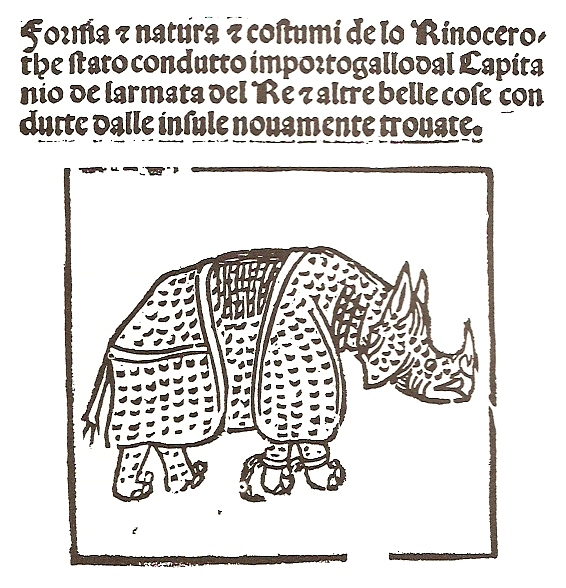
Rhinoceros woodcut from the Giovanni Giacomo Penni poemetto, Bibliotheca Colombina, Spain

Giovanni Giacomo Penni (fl. 16th century) was an Italian physician, born in Florence, known for his text, in verse, about the rhinoceros, following the exhibition of a rhino in Lisbon in 1515.

There is not much biographical information regarding the origin, life and work of Penni. There are some works attributed to Penni, and the analysis of those same works seems to picture a man that was in touch with the royal court house and the high society circles of the time.

The frontispiece of his work states "Forma & Natura & Costumi de lo Rinocerothe stato condutto importogallo dal Capitanio de larmata del Re & altre belle cose condutte dalle insule nouamente trouate"" (English: The Shape, the Nature and the Way of the Rhinoceros brought by the Captain of the Portuguese King's Armada and other beautiful things brought from the new insulars). This work was published on July 13, 1515 (about 10 cm × 9,5 cm) and depicts the oldest representation of the rhinoceros since Roman times, of a specimen known by its Gujarati name of Ganda, presented to King Manuel I of Portugal, by Afonso de Albuquerque in May 1515. It is thought to have influenced Dürer's Rhinoceros.

This manuscript is written in Gothic and the text displayed is in columns with eight sets per page in the first five pages and only three sets in the last one. There is only an identified surviving copy of this work and it is held at the Bibliotheca Colombina in Seville, Spain, under the library code signatura: 6.3.29(32)).

This surviving copy is absolutely marvellous because, along with being one of the kind, it contains the handwriting and signature of Fernando Colón, son of Christopher Columbus. Apparently he had purchased the book and, on the bottom of the last page of the text, he took note of the date and the place of his acquisition: "Este libro costó en Roma medio quatrain por nouiembre de 1515 / Esta registrado 2260" followed by his signature. (English: This book cost, in Rome, a half a quarter in November of 1515 / It's registered 2260). The last page prints "Impresso in Roma in casa de maestro Stephano Guilireti a di tredici de Lu ion el mille e cinquento e quindici. Jo. Ja. De Pennis faciebant Rimas". Stephano Guilireti was the printer of the Penni's work about the Portuguese rhinoceros or "Ganda" like it was called at the time.

Nothing is known about Penni's medical knowledge or skill. His lack of poetic talent was mentioned by Penni, himself in the XXI verse (at left the original text and at the right the English translation):

    Dirá qualcun che questi versi a caso       Someone will say that these verses casually
    si sieno stati fatti e senza ingegnio      have been done and without any genius
    e ch'io vituperi le muse e l'pegaso        and that I insult the great Muses and Pegasus
    mostrando vile et inetto il mi' egegnio    showing my vile and ineptitude ingenious
    (....)continua                             (...) continues

One can also notice that the poem was published only two months after the arrival of the rhinoceros at Lisbon. Since the European communications in 1515 were very precarious this is extremely strange. This strange fact is more dubious when we discovered another pamphlet (with 8 pages), published in Rome at the same time, entitled The Form, Nature and Habits of The Elephant, probably published regarding Hanno, Pope Leo X's elephant, a gift of King Manuel I of Portugal on the Pope's coronation, a couple of years before.

This pamphlet also has a rudimentary woodcut of an elephant. And, like in the Rhinoceros pamphlet, there is only one surviving copy of the Elephant pamphlet. One can also see, when reading Penni's poemmeto, that there are some fundamental historical inaccuracies. These three factors may lead some investigators to conclude that Penni somehow copied the work regarding the Elephant pamphlet, by an unknown artist, and adjusted it to the rumours, not all correct, that were spreading in Rome regarding the Portuguese "Ganda".
