= Hans Schlottheim =

German goldsmith and clockmaker

Hans Schlottheim (1545–1625) was a goldsmith and clockmaker active in Augsburg, Germany, now best known for his clockwork automata.
