= Burghley Nef =

Medieval salt cellar

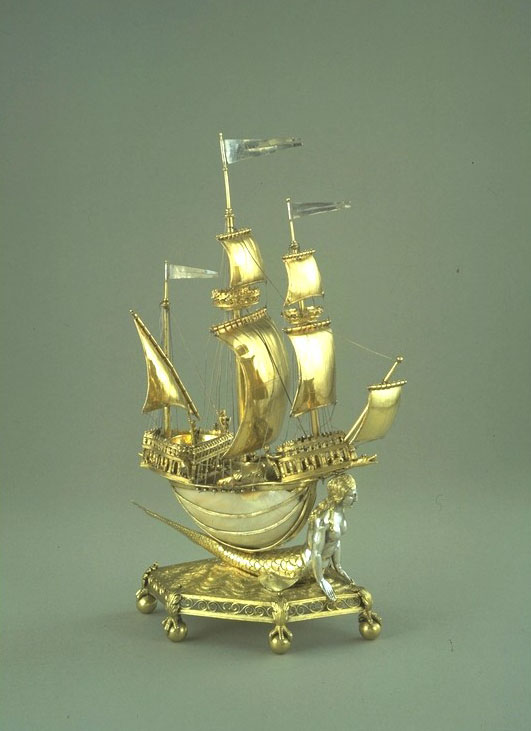
The Burghley Nef, 1527-1528, France; V&A Museum no. M.60-1959

The Burghley Nef is a parcel-gilt salt cellar made in Paris in 1527–28 (or possibly earlier). It is in the form of a late medieval ship, the hull made from a nautilus shell. The ship sits on the back of a mermaid on an hexagonal base. The height is 34.8 centimetres (13.7 in).

In medieval France the word nef was applied to various types of boat-shaped containers, including the most magnificent objects intended for the dining tables and buffets of the rich. Apart from having an obvious ornamental quality, their function was to hold personal pieces of cutlery or, as in this case, salt or spices—there is a detachable compartment on the rear deck, which was presumably passed around the table. This nautilus shell was a rare natural curiosity.

The Burghley Nef would have been placed in front of the most important person at table as a mark of their status. At the foot of the main mast, engaged in a game of chess, are the tiny figures of the lovers Tristan and Iseult who, according to the legend, mistakenly drank a love potion and suffered tragic consequences.

The nef was discovered by Arthur Grimwade in the basement at Burghley House in 1956, and sold on 17 July 1959 when the 6th Marquess of Exeter auctioned part of his silver collection. It is currently in the collection of the Victoria and Albert Museum in London. It was purchased by the V&A with the assistance of the Worshipful Company of Goldsmiths and the National Art Collections Fund.

== General and cited references ==
- Jackson, Anna, ed. (2001). V&A: A Hundred Highlights (Ebook) (New ed.). London: Victoria and Albert Museum. ISBN 9781851773657. OCLC 1151665765.
