= Frederic Morgan, 5th Baron Tredegar =

Welsh peer and landowner

The Right Honourable The Lord Tredegar JP
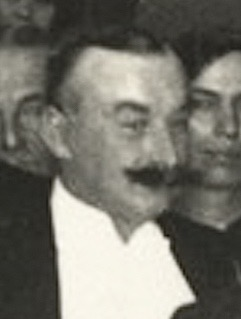
- Photographed in around 1920.
- Born: 22 November 1873; Ruperra Castle, Glamorganshire
- Died: 21 August 1954 (aged 80); Westminster, London
- Title: 5th Baron Tredegar, 7th Morgan Baronet
- Spouse: Dorothy Bassett (m. 1898; div. 1921)
- Children: John Morgan, 6th Baron Tredegar, The Hon. Avis Gurney
- Parents: Colonel the Hon. Frederic Morgan (father); Charlotte Williamson (mother)
- Relatives: Charles Morgan, 1st Baron Tredegar, (grandfather)

Signature
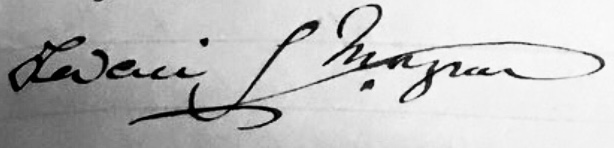

Frederic George Morgan, 5th Baron Tredegar (22 November 1873 — 21 August 1954), styled the Honourable Frederic Morgan between 1913 and 1949, was a Welsh peer and landowner. On the death of his nephew in 1949, he became the fifth Baron Tredegar and seventh Morgan baronet, and inherited the 53,000-acre Tredegar Estate in South East Wales. Due to crippling inheritance tax on estates in the 1940s, Morgan chose to renounce his inheritance in favour of his son, to avoid further inheritance tax in the event of his own death and to attempt to secure the Tredegar Estate.

== Early life and ancestry ==
Frederic George Morgan was born at Ruperra Castle, Glamorganshire, on 22 November 1873 to Colonel the Hon. Frederic Courtenay Morgan and Charlotte Anne Williamson. He was educated at Eton College, following family tradition, and later studied at the University of Oxford. Although he never lived at Tredegar House (even during his time as Lord Tredegar), Morgan spent much of his youth there as the tenure of the property was held consecutively by his uncle, Godfrey, and subsequently by his brother, Courtenay.

The Morgans of Tredegar claimed descent from Welsh princes, and were one of the most powerful families in South Wales. In the 17th-century, Frederic Morgan's forebear, William Morgan, established much of the family's fortune by acquiring substantial landholdings throughout Monmouthshire, Glamorganshire and Breconshire. In the 19th-century, Sir Charles Morgan began to lease out parts of the Tredegar Estate to mining companies. Through such developments, the Morgans played a notable part in the Industrial Revolution in Wales and expanded their wealth significantly. Sir Charles' grandson, another Charles, was created Baron Tredegar in 1859. His second son, Godfrey Morgan fought in the Charge of the Light Brigade in the Crimean War and was made Viscount Tredegar in 1905. Never marrying, Godfrey was succeeded by his nephew Courtenay Morgan in 1913, for whom the Tredegar Viscountcy was revived in 1926. Courtenay Morgan was succeeded by his son Evan Morgan in 1934, who, homosexual despite two marriages, had no children; his heir was his uncle, Frederic.

Morgan was a keen angler and hunter, who kept various fishing books and game books throughout his life, many of which are now held by the National Library of Wales, having been donated by the executors of his daughter, Avis Gurney, following her death in 1963. (Note: The National Library of Wales also holds the extensive Tredegar Estate records which were deposited by Morgan's son, the sixth and final Baron Tredegar, and gifted to the library after his death without heirs in 1962.) In 1909, Morgan became justice of the peace for Brecon and Radnorshire, and latterly was on the supplementary list of magistrates. In 1913, Morgan gained the rank of honourable by royal decree following his brother, Courtenay's, succeeding their uncle as the third Baron Tredegar.

=== Marriage ===
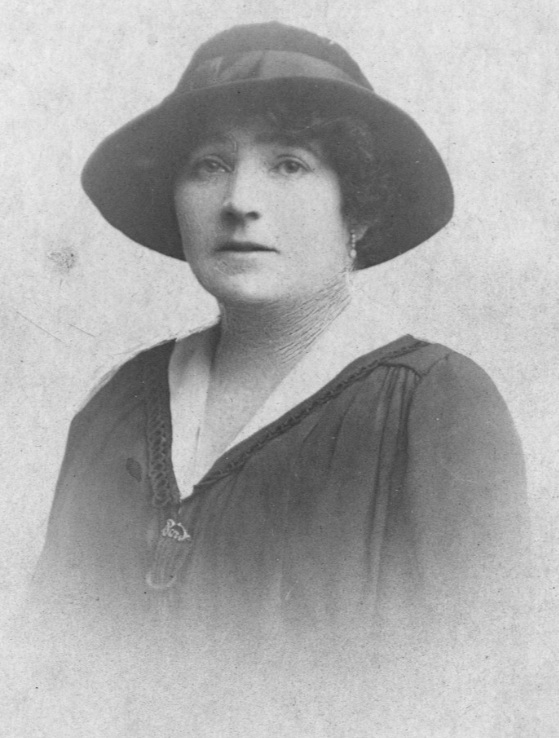
Dorothy Morgan photographed by Arthur Squibbs, 1919

On 14 April 1898, Morgan married Dorothy Syssyllt Bassett (1879–1929) in the parish church of Llanblethian. Dorothy was the daughter of Ralph Bassett (1850–1903), a justice of the peace, Deputy Lieutenant, and High Sheriff, claiming descent from the early Norman Bassets. The bride wore a diamond necklace gifted to her by Morgan's uncle, Godfrey, who was Lord Tredegar at the time.

Frederic and Dorothy made their residence Boughrood Castle in Radnorshire, where they had two children: (Note: Both children were born without titles or courtesy pre-nominals. On their father's succession to the Tredegar Barony in 1949, both became entitled to use the courtesy pre-nominal "the Honourable", or simply "the Hon.", as children of a baron. See courtesy titles in the United Kingdom for further reading.)

- The Hon. Syssyllt Avis Morgan, (1903–1963), married Peter Hugh Gurney (m. 1926; div. 1934). Died without issue.
- (Frederic Charles) John Morgan, 6th Baron Tredegar, (1908–1962), married Joanna Russell in 1954. Died without issue.

At Boughrood, Frederic and Dorothy frequently hosted the Boughrood Flower Show, and became locally involved, with Frederic overseeing the breeding and selling livestock on the home-farm, often winning competitions with his animals.

In November 1919, Dorothy began an affair with Ralph Kirby, a Second Lieutenant in the King’s Shropshire Light Infantry, while he was stationed in Pembrokeshire. As a result, Frederic filed for divorce against her in March 1920, on the grounds of "frequent adultery" and took custody of their two children. Dorothy married Ralph in the following year. In his autobiography, The Bonus of Laughter, Alan Pryce-Jones noted Morgan as having a miserable persona in his later life, attributing this to the "disappearance and indeed misconduct of his wife". Although Morgan never remarried, Pryce-Jones references him having an elderly mistress, Miss Bassett-Boot, in the 1920s, of whom his daughter, Avis, was particularly fond. (Note: Alan Pryce-Jones befriended Morgan's son, John, at Eton College, and was also the best man at the wedding of his daughter, Avis, in 1926. He referred to Morgan as "Uncle Freddy" but stated that in reality he was a "very remote cousin".)

Morgan left Boughrood Castle in 1921, and with the exception of a brief stint in Scotland, spent the remainder of his life in various Mayfair flats.

== Later life ==
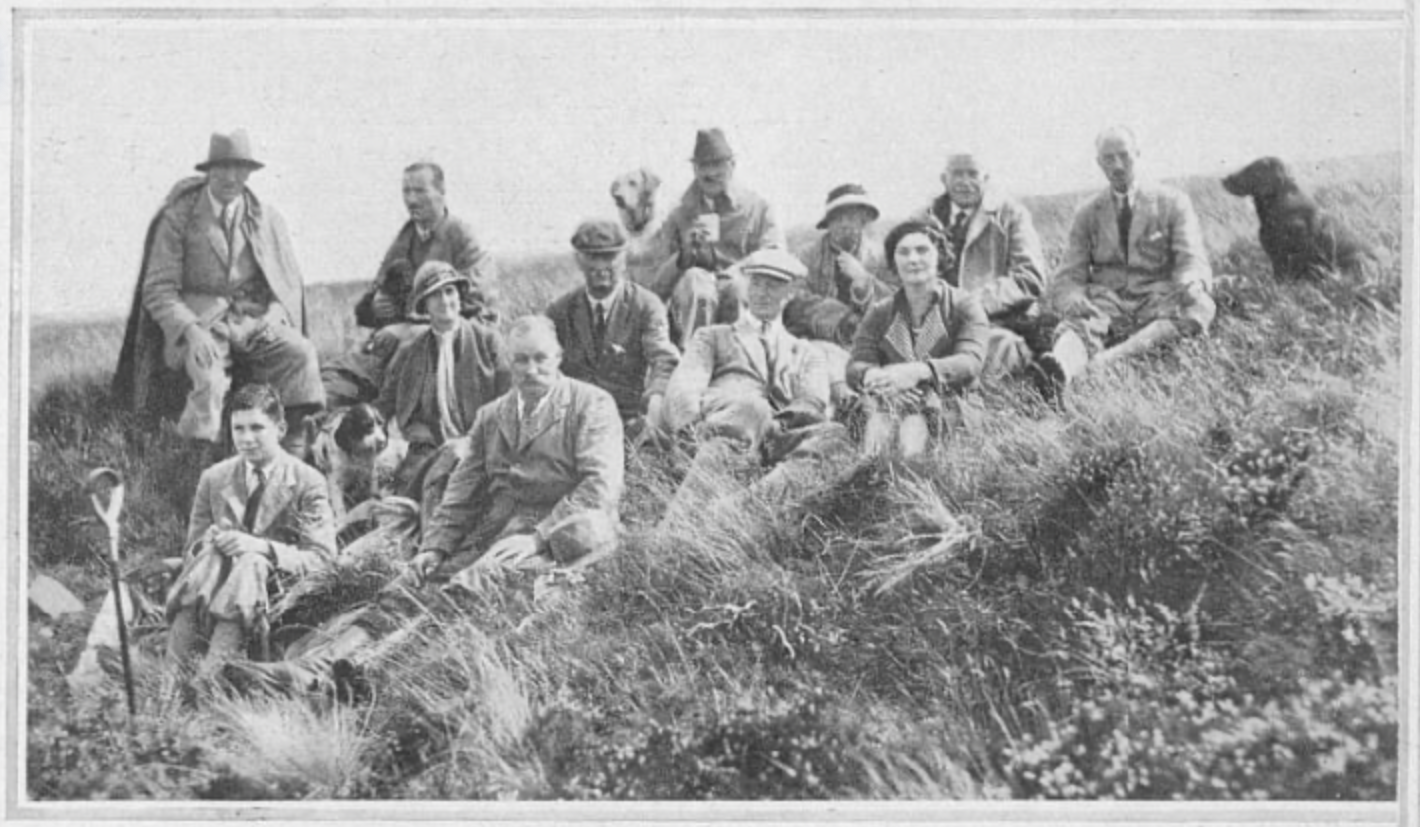
Morgan (far right) at the Duke of Montrose's shooting party, 1933

In 1937, houses 208-238 Pantbach Road, Rhiwbina, which Morgan co-owned with the Earl of Carrick and the Hon. Simon Rodney, came under a compulsory purchase order with the intention of demolition to "widen and improve" Pantbach Road. All three men were trustees of the Tredegar Estate.

=== Inheritance ===
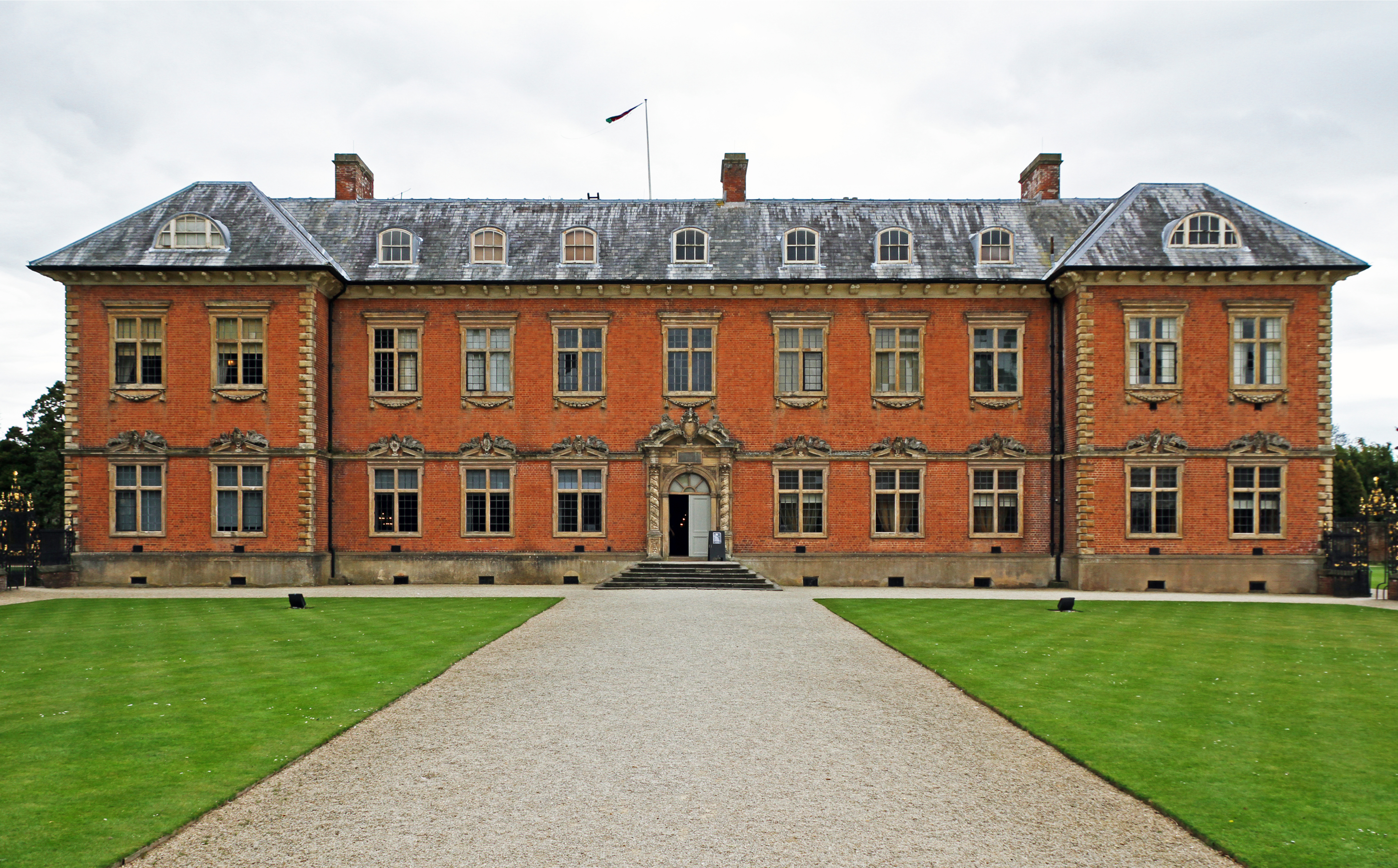
Tredegar House, which Morgan inherited in 1949.

On the death of his nephew, Evan Morgan, on 27 April 1949, he became the fifth Baron Tredegar and seventh Morgan baronet, and inherited the 53,000-acre Tredegar Estate including the Morgans' ancestral home, Tredegar House. Neither Frederic, nor his son John, enjoyed good relations with Evan. This disharmony saw them unable to reach an agreement regarding estate planning prior to Evan's death; Evan refused to transfer any of the estate to John, and Frederic refused Evan's suggestion to sell parts of the estate. As a result, Frederic succeeded to the estates, the barony, and the baronetcy with an inheritance tax bill of £1,000,000. (Note: £1,000,000 in 1949 equates to approximately £30,553,000 in 2025, according to calculations based on the Consumer Price Index measure of inflation.) In 1949, during an interview with the Yorkshire Observer, Frederic described himself as being "nearly crippled with osteoarthritis", asserting "I cannot expect to live very long". It was on this basis that Morgan made arrangements for the estate to transfer immediately to John, while retaining the titles for himself. This ensured that so long as Frederic's died at least five years after the transfer, the estates would be exempt from a second bout of death-duties.

My reading of the position is that if I had inherited the estates, another 80% would go in duties in the event of my own death, leaving very little to carry on the estates. It is difficult to give exact figures. It makes me think that I could sit down and cry when I consider what has got to happen. There will have to be staff cuts and some of our tenants may be displaced if we have to sell farms. None of this need happen if we had not got a government of hungry wolves to whom we are just vermin.

— Lord Tredegar, 1949.

John Morgan told the press that he would make Tredegar House his residence "on a modest scale in view of the prevailing conditions". Despite this, the property was sold in 1951, and John Morgan's sale of the remaining 53,000-acre Tredegar Estate in 1957, and death without issue in 1962, signalled in the end of the Morgans of Tredegar.

== Death and legacy ==
Having been in ill-health for some time, Morgan died on 21 August 1954, aged 80. His son, John Morgan, succeeded him in his barony and baronetcy. (Note: Several newspaper obituaries state that Morgan died in his flat at 42 Upper Brook Street, Mayfair. While he did have a flat there for around the last five years of his life, The London Gazette gives his place of death as 2 Whitehall Court. This is supported by a letter of condolence from Compton Mackenzie to Morgan's daughter, Avis Gurney, addressed to Flat 43, 2 Whitehall Court.) An obituary in the Western Mail quoted Morgan's son as saying of him "He will be remembered as a keen sportsman, who always had tenants' interests at heart. His interests in those who attached themselves to the Tredegar family never diminished." On 25 August 1954, a Requiem Mass was celebrated for Morgan at The Church of The Immaculate Conception, Mayfair, conducted by Father Maurice O’Leary, with his interment being held at the Roman Catholic cemetery, St Pancras. Morgan left gross estates of £6488 (Note: £6488 in 1954 equates to approximately £154,000 in 2025, according to calculations based on the Consumer Price Index measure of inflation.), having already transferred the Tredegar estates he inherited in 1949 to his son.

In 1960, Morgan's butler, Thomas Cronin, gave an interview to The People, speaking extensively about him. Cronin described him as "an exceedingly lonely man... who never exchanged a sentence with me unless it was absolutely necessary." Cronin stated that in his later years, Morgan sustained his interest in horse racing by betting large wagers on races: "A winning day would lead to an evening decorated with smiles; failure would mean a bout of gloom at dinner." Morgan followed a strict schedule, leaving his flat at 10:00 for Boodle's Club, staying for lunch, before starting for the local graveyard gardens, where he would sit "pending the receipt of news as to the success or failure of his wagers." During the interview, Cronin recalled a time when instead of the accustomed acknowledging nod on his entry into Morgan's bedroom, Morgan spoke, "Cronin. I think I am dying." Not wishing to break their habitual servant-master dynamic, Cronin responded "Very good, my Lord."

== Sources ==
- Clark, Gregory (2023). "The Annual RPI and Average Earnings for Britain, 1209 to Present (New Series)". MeasuringWorth.

Baronetage of Great Britain
Preceded by Evan Morgan	Baronet (of Tredegar); 1949–1954	Succeeded by John Morgan
Peerage of the United Kingdom
Preceded by Evan Morgan	Baron Tredegar; 1949–1954	Succeeded by John Morgan
