= John Morgan, 6th Baron Tredegar =

Welsh peer and landowner

The Right Honourable The Lord Tredegar OStJ
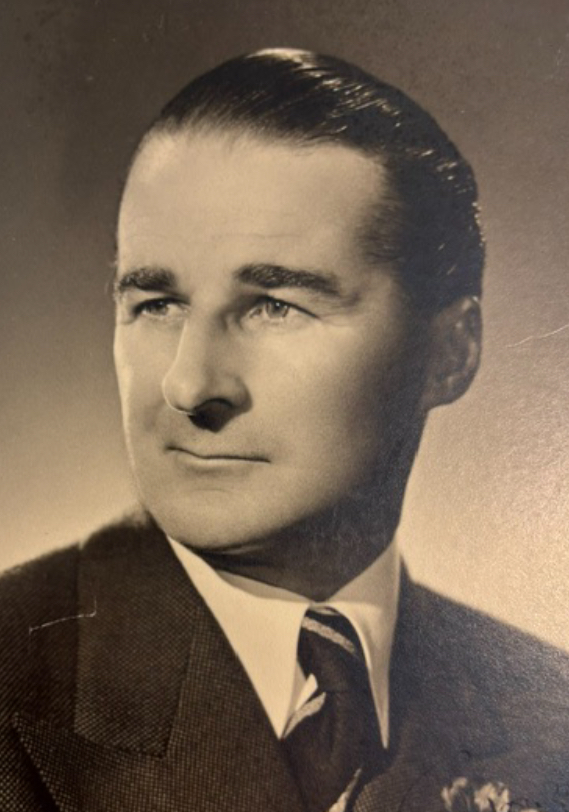
- Bassano portrait of Morgan, 1949
- Born: 26 October 1908; Boughrood Castle, Radnorshire
- Died: 17 November 1962 (aged 54); St. George's Hospital, London
- Title: 6th Baron Tredegar, 8th Morgan Baronet
- Spouse: Joanna Russell (m. 1954)
- Parents: Frederic Morgan, 5th Baron Tredegar (father); Dorothy Bassett (mother)
- Relatives: Evan Morgan, 2nd Viscount Tredegar, (cousin)

Frederic Charles John Morgan, 6th Baron Tredegar, OStJ, (26 October 1908 – 17 November 1962), styled the Honourable John Morgan between 1949 and 1954, was a Welsh peer and landowner. His forebears' lavish spending and disagreement regarding estate planning meant that on his father's succession to the Morgan titles and estates in 1949 their future was uncertain, and £1,000,000 (Note: £1,000,000 in 1949 equates to approximately £30,553,000 in 2025, according to calculations based on the Consumer Price Index measure of inflation.) was to be paid in death duties. Although efforts were made to protect the longevity of the estates, the burden of death-duties was too great, forcing Morgan to liquidate the entirety of the family’s estates. John Morgan's death in 1962 saw failure of the male Morgan bloodline, and the extinction of the titles attached to it, bringing an end to a social and political dynasty that had dominated South East Wales for 500 years.

== Early life and ancestry ==
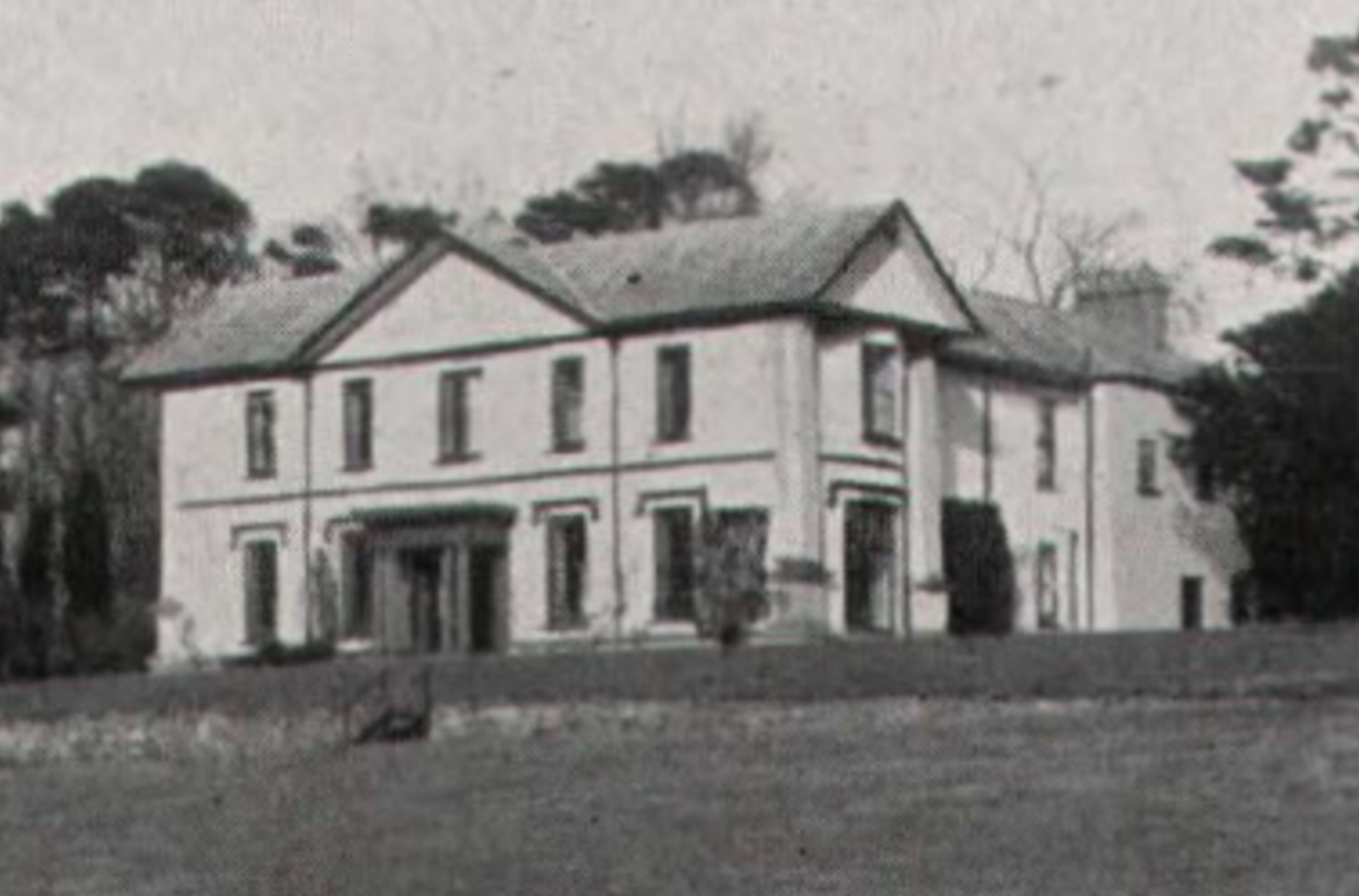
Morgan's childhood home, Boughrood Castle, featured in a 1921 issue of Country Life.

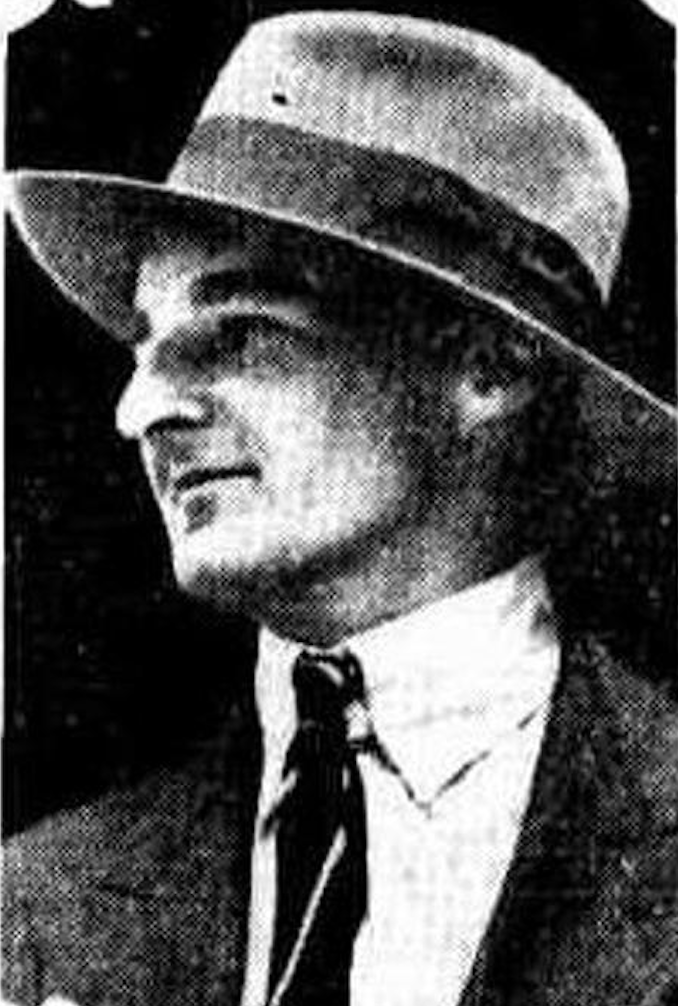
Morgan featured in an Australian newspaper, during his visit in 1932.

Frederic Charles John Morgan was born at Boughrood Castle, Radnorshire, on 26 October 1908 to Frederic George Morgan, 5th Baron Tredegar (then simply Frederic Morgan Esq.) and Dorothy Syssyllt Bassett. Through his maternal line, Morgan was a descendent of the ancient Bassets, a family of early Norman settlers. Although sharing his father and grandfather’s forename, Morgan was known as John. He was educated at Eton College following family tradition, but did not attend university. It was while studying at Eton that Morgan befriended Alan Pryce-Jones. Pryce-Jones' father nicknamed Morgan "Pinhead", with even Alan conceding that Morgan was "rather a silly boy". (Note: Pryce-Jones was also best man at the wedding of Morgan's sister, Avis, and a friend of his cousin, Evan Morgan.)

The Morgans claimed descent from Welsh princes, and were among the most powerful families in South Wales, their fortunes having been established by William Morgan, who was a politician, and acquired substantial landholdings throughout Monmouthshire, Glamorganshire and Breconshire. (Note: The Tredegar Estate was located in the historic county of Monmouthshire but local government reorganisation in 1994 placed the estate in the county borough of Newport.) His descendants continued the family's political and social ascent; Charles Morgan becoming a baronet in 1792, and another Charles becoming 1st Baron Tredegar in 1859. His second son, Godfrey Morgan fought in the Charge of the Light Brigade in the Crimean War and was made Viscount Tredegar in 1905. Never marrying, Godfrey was in turn succeeded by his nephew Courtenay Morgan, for whom the Tredegar viscountcy was revived in 1926. Evan Morgan succeeded his father in 1934. Having no children of his own, his heir was his uncle, Frederic Morgan, father of John.

Morgan's parents divorced in 1921, following an affair between his mother and Ralph Kirby, who she would marry the day following the finalisation of the divorce; Morgan's father took custody of him and his sister, Avis. Morgan's father never remarried, and his mother died in 1929. Morgan joined the Territorial Army, becoming a second lieutenant in the 24th Battalion, London Regiment, on 19 December 1927, resigning from the post on 19 February 1930. It is considered that aside from his army service, Morgan never appeared to have an occupation. Following his resignation from the army, Morgan lived as an expatriate in New Zealand and Australia, where he was engaged in writing a novel based on his travels, before returning to London in 1932. The following year he continued writing, spending a number of months in Ceylon with his sister, Avis. In the late 1930s, Morgan studied painting under Leonard Fuller at the newly established St Ives School of Painting.

At the beginning of the Second World War, Morgan rejoined the British Army, becoming a second lieutenant in the King's Own Scottish Borderers (KOSB) on 15 December 1939. Morgan served in Scotland and the Middle East, joining the Reconnaissance Corps on 14 January 1941. Morgan transferred back to the KOSB on 29 September 1943 as a lieutenant. With the war over, Morgan resigned his commission on 19 November 1945, being granted the honorary rank of captain.

== Inheritance ==
Between 1934 and 1949, John Morgan's first cousin, Evan Morgan, 2nd Viscount Tredegar, was head of the Morgan family and occupier of Tredegar House. Evan spent copiously during his life with a menagerie of bears, birds, and kangaroos installed at the family home, while his weekend house parties played host to the likes of H.G Wells and Aldous Huxley. Although a Roman Catholic, Evan had a fascination with the occult and enjoyed a long friendship with Aleister Crowley. Despite marrying twice, Evan was homosexual and died without children leaving his 75 year old uncle Frederic as his heir. While Frederic and Evan did not enjoy good relations, John and Evan shared a mutual loathing.

As a result of Evan's eccentricities, by the end of the 1940s the family's fortune was depleted. Between 1946 and 1947, several meetings took place between the trustees of the Tredegar Estate in an attempt to recover the lost capital. With Evan refusing to transfer any of the estate to John, and Frederic refusing Evan's suggestion to sell parts of the estate, no agreements were made. On Evan's death in 1949, Frederic inherited the Tredegar Estate, the barony, the baronetcy and a death-duty tax bill of £1,000,000.

Frederic, who described himself as an "arthritis cripple", immediately transferred the Tredegar Estate to his son, John, thereby ensuring that, so long as Frederic died at least five years later, the estates would be exempt from a second bout of death-duties; consequently, John inherited a tax-free £1,150,000 fortune. (Note: £1,150,000 in 1949 equates to approximately £35,135,000 in 2025, according to calculations based on the Consumer Price Index measure of inflation.) As a Catholic convert, Morgan made a pilgrimage to Lourdes for guidance as for what to do with his fortune and family estates. At the time, he told the Western Mail that he was prepared to "live at Tredegar Park on a very modest scale in view of the prevailing conditions" adding "although my father is crippled with osteo-arthritis, it is my earnest wish that he may be enabled to share with me the family home where he spent so many happy years of his early youth." In October 1949, a portrait of Morgan was completed by Leonard Fuller to be hung at Tredegar House.

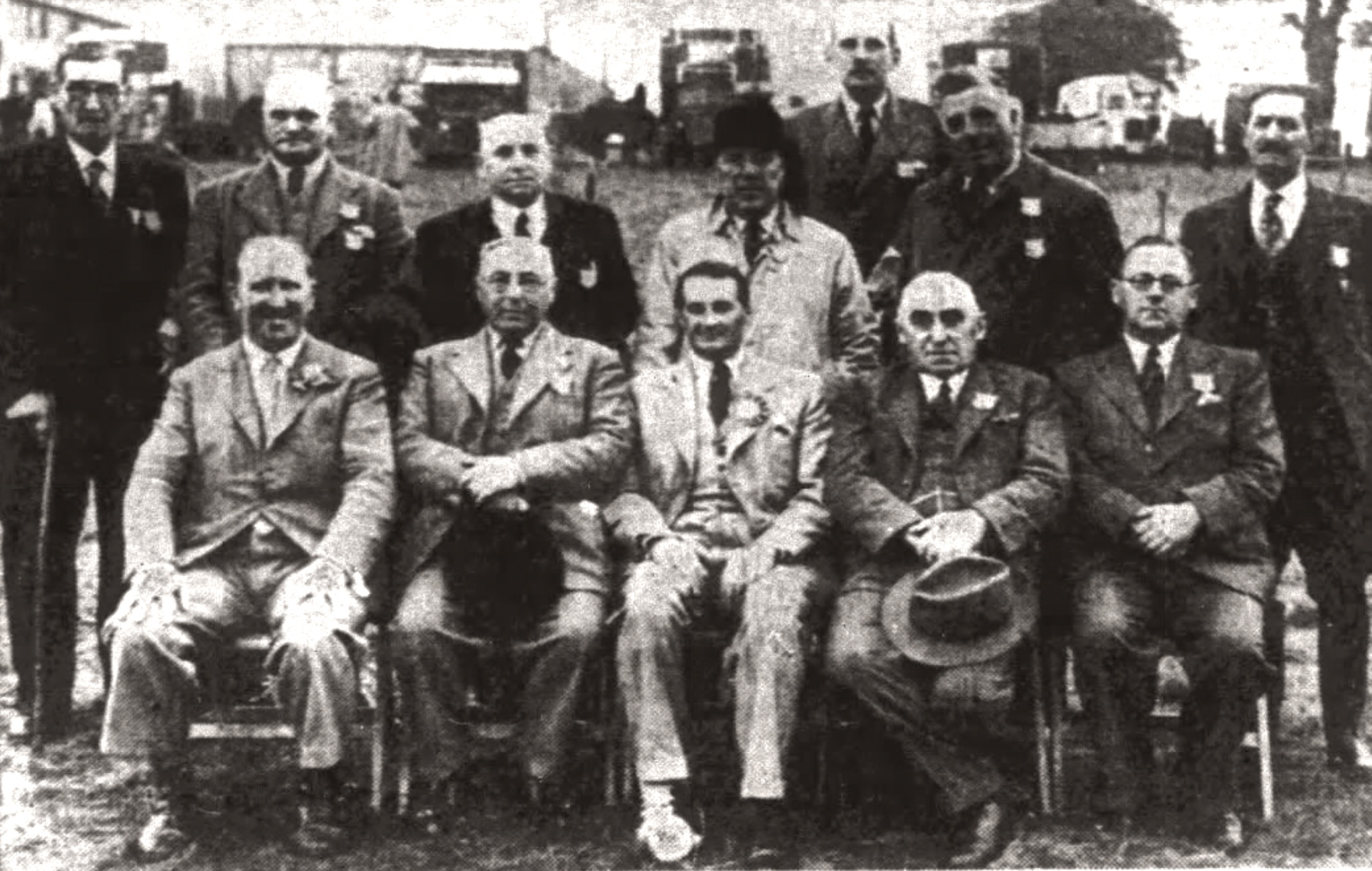
Morgan (front-row, centre) at a Bedwellty Agricultural Society show, 1950.

Ultimately, fragile health prevented Morgan’s father from joining him at Tredegar House, and while Morgan himself did not make it his permanent residence, he did occasionally stay there for days at a time. As the sole occupier of Tredegar House, and representative of the Morgan family, John Morgan became a regent-like figure, assuming the various social roles that his father would have otherwise held as Lord Tredegar. Among many other organisations, in 1949 Morgan became President of the Bedwellty Agricultural Society, becoming heavily involved in the society’s meetings and shows. In 1950, Morgan was appointed an Officer of the Order of St. John, having already liaised for many months with the Priory for Wales as Assistant Almoner. Reporting on an event which Morgan had chaired in the same year, the South Wales Argus commented "the more we see of [Morgan], the more we like him." (Note: John Morgan also served as President of the following organisations: Bedwellty Agricultural Society; Mynyddislwyn Agricultural Society; Monmouthshire Arts and Crafts Society; Bedwellty Conservative Association; Henllys Sheep Dog Society; Newport Athletic Club; In addition, he was Vice-President of the St. Mellons Young Farmers' Club, an honorary member of the Newport and Monmouthshire Chamber of Commerce, and Co-Master of the Tredegar Farmers’ Hunt Foxhounds.)

== Disposal of Morgan estates ==
=== Tredegar House ===
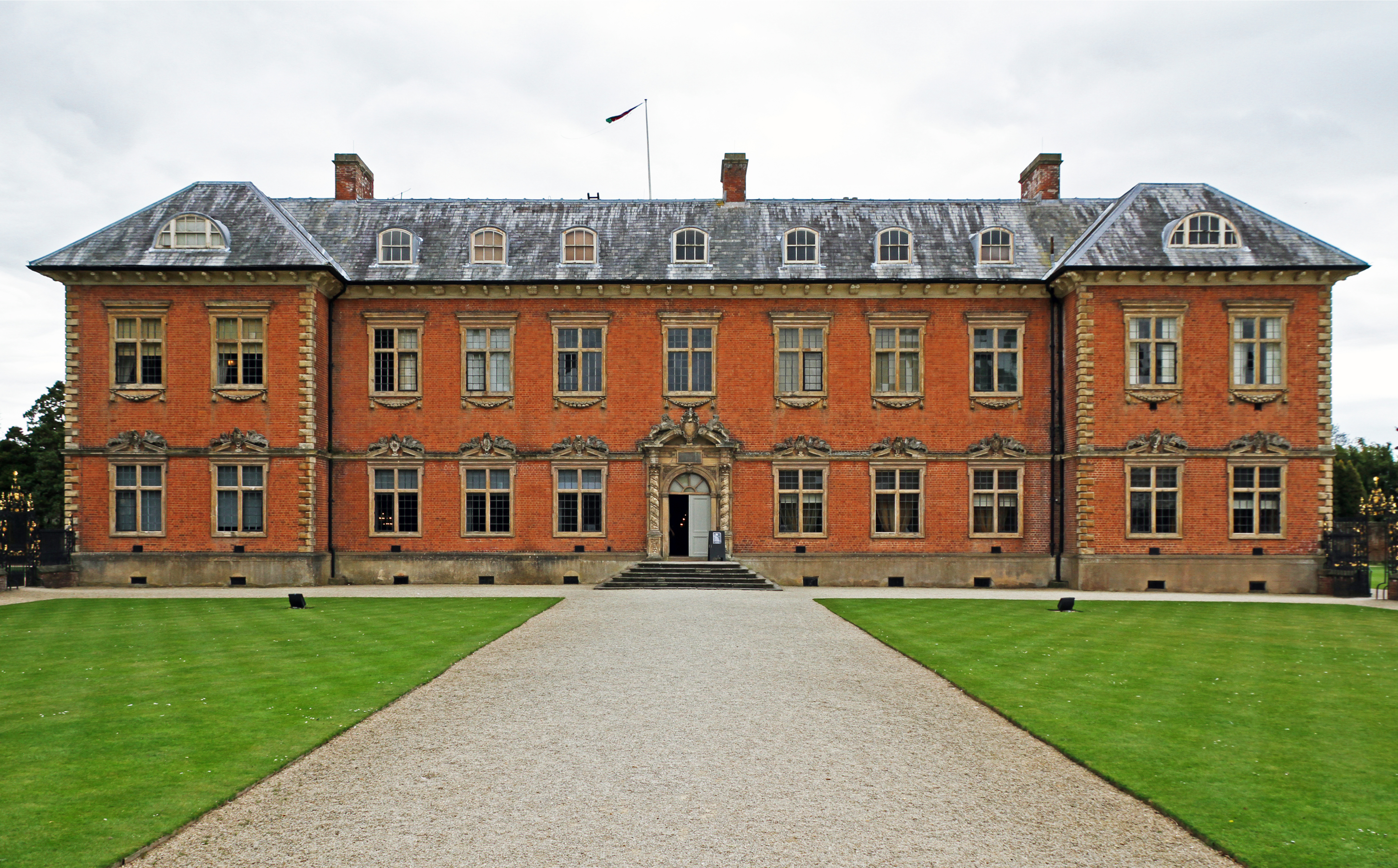
North-western façade of Tredegar House in 2015.

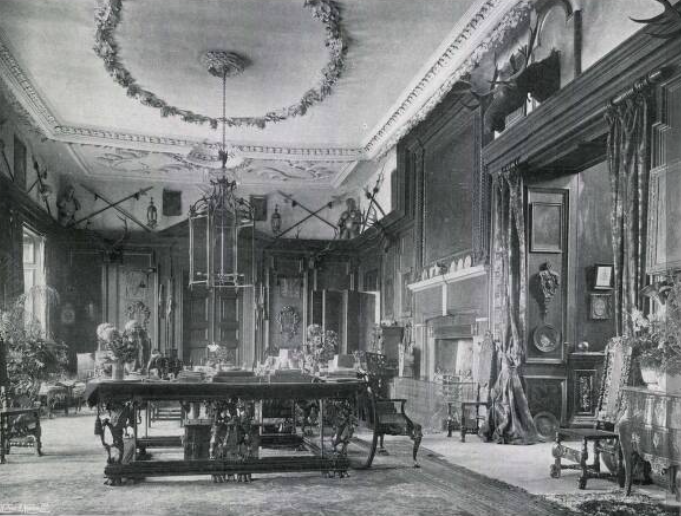
The New Hall at Tredegar House, featured in a 1908 issue of Country Life.

While Morgan occasionally stayed at Tredegar for days at a time, rising costs coupled with outstanding death-duties meant he never made it his permanent residence. In 1949, Morgan considered donating the house to the National Trust, with James Lees-Milne assessing the property, but did not proceed with the plan. (Note: While the plans to donate Tredegar House never came to fruition, Lees-Milne nevertheless recorded his views of the house's importance, and of Morgan himself, when he visited Tredegar as secretary of the National Trust's Country House Committee in 1949; "Was met by John Morgan, flying his personal flag on the radiator of his motor, and driven to Tredegar. He is absurdly pompous and puffed up with self-importance, yet has a genuine sense of duty, and his religion means everything to him. We spent the afternoon going round the house. Now, it is important and probably the best in Wales. Nevertheless, I was a trifle disappointed by the coarse, unrefined quality of the craftsmanship.") In August 1950, he announced "with great regret" that death duties, taxation and rising costs had made it necessary for him to close Tredegar House. In December of the same year, he agreed to sell the house and its remaining 200-acre (80 ha) parkland to the Sisters of St. Joseph for £40,000, asserting that the sale was "good for his bank balance, and his soul". (Note: £40,000 in 1950 equates to approximately £1,184,000 in 2025, according to calculations based on the Consumer Price Index measure of inflation.) In January 1951, Morgan allowed Iorwerth Peate, keeper-in-charge for St Fagans Castle, to choose 30 pieces of furniture from Tredegar House for exhibition in the period rooms of the castle. Permission was also given for the National Library of Wales to select around 200 volumes from the library at Tredegar House for their collection; this was the library's "second selection of printed books, manuscripts and prints", which suggests that further volumes were selected at an earlier date. Morgan also deposited the majority of the Morgan family manuscripts and papers of the to the National Library of Wales, so that they would be preserved in the event of him dying without an heir, despite allegedly having already promised them to the Newport Borough Library. Councillor A. F. Dolman described changing the destination of the documents as a "breech of faith". Later, Morgan directed Stephenson & Alexander, a firm of auctioneers, to dispose of the remaining contents of the house in sales on 11–12 July 1951. On the sale of the house, Morgan asked the nuns to hang portraits of his family and ancestors in one room to ensure that a Morgan presence remained in the house after his departure. The house was used by the Sisters as a school until 1974, when it was bought by Newport County Council. In 2012, it was acquired by the National Trust via a 50-year lease agreement.

=== Intentions ===
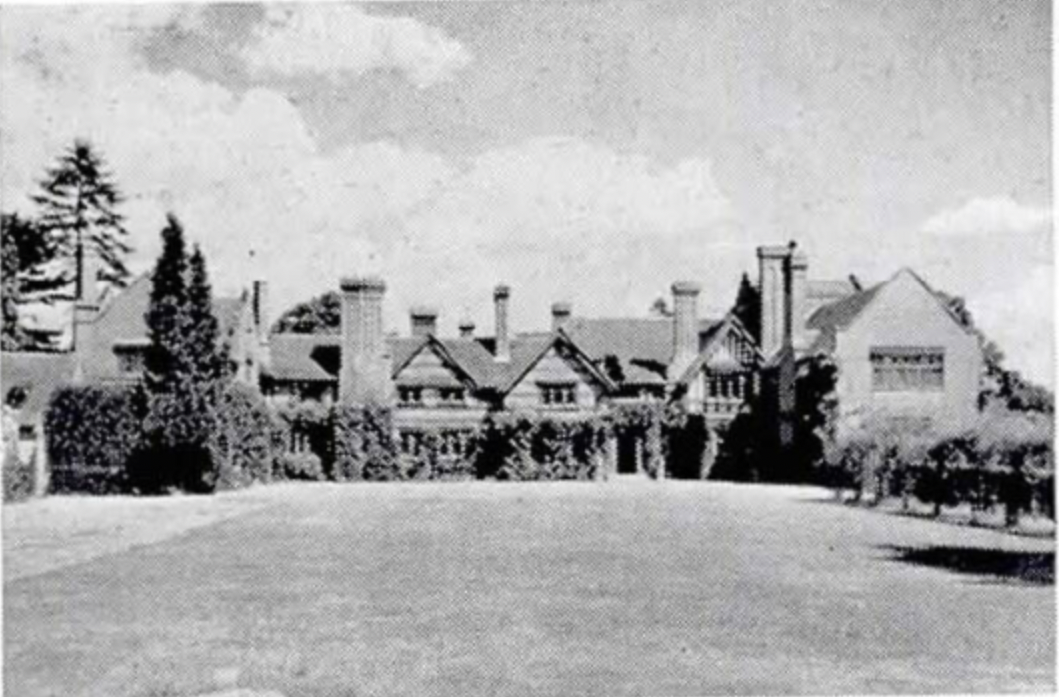
Honeywood House featured in a 1954 issue of Country Life, where it was advertised prior to Morgan's disposal of the house and surrounding estate.

When Morgan announced that he would sell Tredegar House in 1950, he told the press that he "intended to live at Honeywood House, West Sussex" (another of the Morgan properties) and had "no intention of breaking his connection with South Wales". Honeywood was reported to be Morgan's main residence until 1952, when it was announced that he was to move to Gattonside House, Roxburghshire. Morgan directed much of the furniture at Honeywood to be auctioned, while various positions were advertised for Gattonside. In 1953, Morgan suddenly resigned from all of his Welsh social roles, seemingly severing his links with South Wales. At the time it was suggested that this could be due to the fact that he had failed to receive an invitation to meet Queen Elizabeth II and the Duke of Edinburgh during a royal visit to Newport earlier in the year, despite being one of the largest landowners in the area. Commenting on the matter, Lord Raglan noted, "the number of persons to be presented was limited to the holders of definite offices in Monmouthshire: bishops, chairmen, and the like." It was speculated that Morgan's failure to receive an invitation was due to him not holding such an office, and having not lived in Wales for some years by this time having moved once again, from Gattonside, to 16 Randolph Crescent, an Edinburgh townhouse. Now without his social positions and still facing crippling death-duties, Morgan became a tax-exile in Monaco, directing two firms of auctioneers to dispose of Honeywood House and its surrounding 172 acres (70 ha) at auction in 1954.

=== Ruperra Castle ===
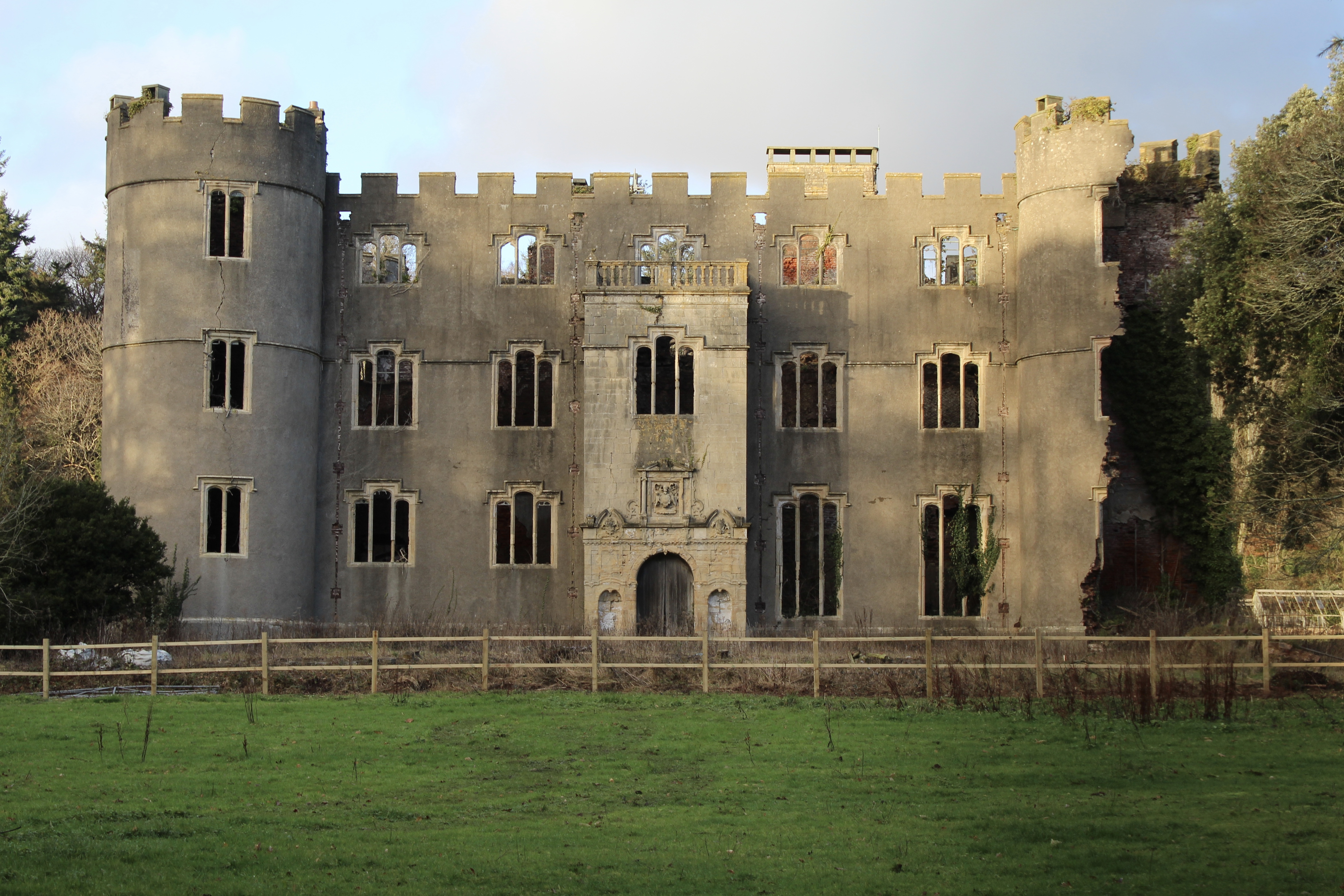
Ruperra Castle in 2026, still in ruinous condition.

Ruperra Castle was traditionally home of the heir to the Tredegar estates, but during the twentieth century was primarily used as the family's weekend hunting lodge. In 1941, the castle had been severely damaged by a fire while under the military's control. In 1949, there was a possibility that the castle would be bequeathed to the nation with the intention of using it as a memorial to Welshmen lost during the Second World War and placing it in the care of the National Trust. The day following his visit to Tredegar House, James Lees-Milne visited Ruperra Castle to assess it on behalf of the trust, concluding that he saw no point in the proposal due to the castle's ruinous condition. (Note: Lees-Milne's view of the castle is recorded in his book of diaries, Midway on the Waves; "This fine morning [Morgan and I] motored to Ruperra Castle which the Welsh want to buy from John as a memorial to Welshmen killed in the war and vest in the Nat. Trust. I could not see any point in it at all. The castle was burnt out during the war by British troops. There remains one Jacobean two-story porch which is all right. Some unsightly outbuildings, the walled garden gone to seed and deer park to thistles and nettles.") In 1956, Morgan sold the castle and some surrounding land to the Eagle Star Insurance Company for around £800,000 in today's money. In 1982, the south-eastern tower collapsed. At present there are large cracks in the other three towers as the castle continues to deteriorate.

=== Agricultural estate ===
In February 1956, it was published that the 53,000-acre (21,000 ha) Tredegar agricultural estate was to be sold in a series of auctions overseen by Lane, Saville & Co. It was reported that the estate consisted of housing, shops, banks, offices, docklands in Newport, and 100 tenanted farms with an estimated income of £120,000 per annum. (Note: £120,000 in 1956 equates to approximately £2,599,000 in 2025, according to calculations based on the Consumer Price Index measure of inflation.) Morgan assured the press that tenants would be given first refusal to buy their lease holdings, and that if a buyer for the entire estate was found prior to the auction, any sale agreements with tenants that had already been arranged would be honoured, adding that he had "hoped the estate might find a buyer as a whole". Shortly afterwards, the firm told the Western Mail that tenants would only be given first refusal to buy their lease holdings "where possible", a contrast to the original statement which suggested that tenants would be given first refusal, absolutely.

As a result, Mr W. Watson Cliffe of the Welsh Union of Leasehold Reformers, held a meeting stating that he wished for "Lord Tredegar to keep his promise and offer every tenant the land on which his house stands" adding that "he hoped that within a month his union would boast a thousand members." In November 1956, it was revealed that a 72-year-old woman living in Roath, Cardiff, had been asked by the agents of the Tredegar Estate to pay £515 for her house, despite similar properties having been sold for £100 two months earlier. Cliffe stated that he had "written to Lord Tredegar, but received no response", and that he was "shook" by the incident, having "consistently referred to Morgan's generosity throughout the union's meetings". Morgan's solicitors wrote to Cliffe explaining that "the sale of the freehold was completed some time ago, and it was not possible to re-open negotiations". Unsatisfied, Cliffe wrote to Lord Tredegar once again asking for a personal interview to discuss the "full-facts" of the situation. With no response yet again, Cliffe petitioned to start an inquiry into the case, hoping to gain public support.

If this union never does anything else it must try to get back the money this poor woman has paid the Tredegar Estates... When the details of the public meeting are completed, we shall invite representatives of every public body we can think of. This should stir the public more than anything we have done. Tredegar Estates, too, would be invited.

— Mr W. Watson Cliffe

As of October 1956, Cliffe stated that his union had "frightened" the Tredegar estate agents into offering the lease holdings to all tenants. Had he not petitioned the cause, Cliffe believed that the agents would have "offered the leases only to a few tenants". By November 1957, the Eagle Star Insurance Company had bought the majority of the 53,000-acre (21,000 ha) agricultural estate and Monmouthshire town properties, raising around £3,000,000. (Note: £3,000,000 in 1957 equates to approximately £62,835,000 in 2025, according to calculations based on the Consumer Price Index measure of inflation.)

== Later life ==
Following the death of his father on 21 August 1954, Morgan succeeded to the family titles becoming the sixth Baron Tredegar and eighth Morgan Baronet. Morgan remained a bachelor until the age of 46; on 19 December 1954, he married Joanna Russell (1910–2000), at Caxton Hall, London. The new Lady Tredegar, who went by "Joan", had been married twice previously and Morgan became step-father to three daughters, one from Joanna's first marriage, one from her second marriage to Commander Archibald Russell, and one of her own step-daughters from Russell’s previous marriage. In 1955, Lord and Lady Tredegar featured in Tatler, alongside Lady Tredegar's daughter, Bridget, at St. Moritz. The following year, after the announcement of the sale of the Tredegar Estate, Lord and Lady Tredegar visited the Tredegar Estates Office where they thanked former Tredegar House employees, as well as workers from the office. Later, they visited Tredegar House, Lady Tredegar's first time apart from a brief visit during the Second World War.

=== Exile and Death ===
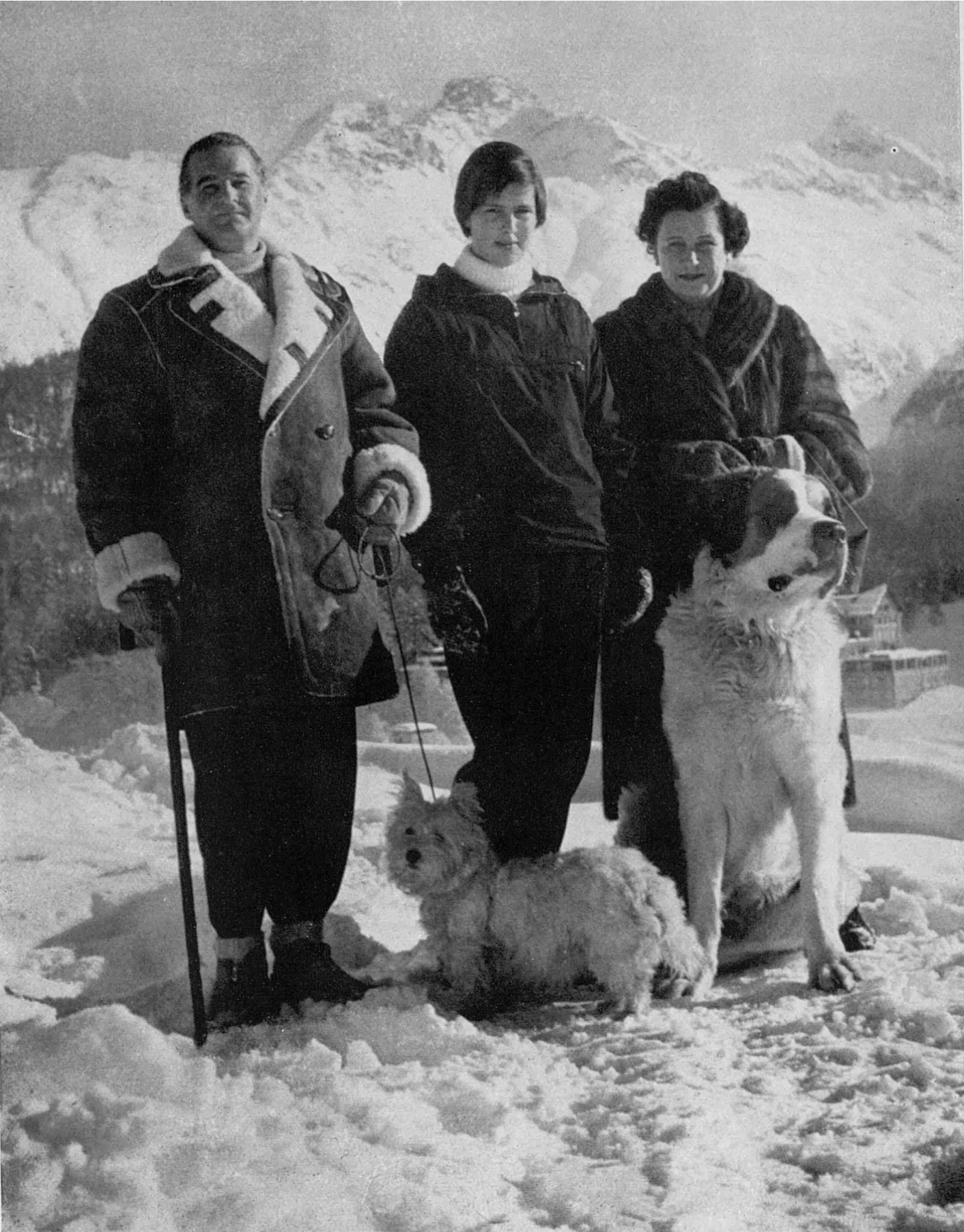
Morgan with wife and stepdaughter, Bridget, walking their dogs at St Moritz. Featured in Tatler, 1955

Despite liquidating property and parts of his estate in lieu of death-duties, Morgan claimed that further taxation forced his decision to emigrate to Monte-Carlo, Monaco, as a tax exile in 1954. In exile, Morgan resumed painting after a long hiatus, having initially studied under Leonard Fuller at the St Ives School of Art in the 1930s, and produced several works which are now owned by the National Trust and displayed in Tredegar House. He also enjoyed golf and yachting, and was a member of the Royal Yacht Squadron.

In 1959, Morgan embarked on a 2,000-mile (3,200 km) journey on his motor-yacht, the Henry Morgan, which he named after his distant ancestor, Sir Henry Morgan. While just off Bermuda, the Henry Morgan became at risk of sinking, faced with 25-foot (8 m) waves. Lord Tredegar allegedly went below-deck asserting, "there is nothing I can do about it; wake me when the fuss is over". A year prior, while aboard the Henry Morgan, Lady Tredegar's step-daughter, Judith Russell, met her future husband, Jeannot Garziglia, while he was working as a deck-hand for Lord Tredegar. They were married in 1961.

In 1962, Morgan became ill with bronchopneumonia, and returned to London as he did not trust the local doctors. An operation to treat the pneumonia was carried out on 10 October. Morgan subsequently received a Whipple Procedure to treat chronic pancreatitis which had emerged following the initial operation. Although he appeared to be recovering, Morgan suffered a secondary haemorrhage from his intestine and contracted septicaemia. Failing to recover, Morgan died without issue on 17 November, at St. George’s Hospital, aged 54. As Morgan died childless and without an heir, the male Morgan bloodline failed along with the barony and baronetcy it carried. This, coupled with his disposal of the Tredegar Estate in the 1950s, brought an end to a dynasty that had existed in South Wales for some 500 years.

He left estates with a net value of £309,580, (Note: £309,580 in 1962 equates to approximately £5,778,000 in 2025, according to calculations based on the Consumer Price Index measure of inflation.) donating £500 (Note: £500 in 1962 equates to approximately £9,000 in 2025, according to calculations based on the Consumer Price Index measure of inflation.) to the London Church of the Immaculate Conception, Farm Street in his will. Morgan also specified for his funeral to be carried out in the "simplest manner", wishing for any money that would have been spent on flowers to be donated to the Catholic Church or charity. On 22 November, a requiem Mass was celebrated at the Church of the Immaculate Conception, for Morgan, after which he was interred at the St. Pancras Roman Catholic Cemetery. Morgan's widow went on to sell and donate sixty to seventy paintings to Newport County Council for display at Tredegar House, including portraits of the Morgan family as well as some of Morgan's own paintings.

== Sources ==
=== Books ===
- Lees-Milne, James (2009) [1975]. Some Country Houses and their Owners. English Jounrneys. London: Penguin Books. ISBN 978-0-141-19090-7. OCLC 297799885.
- Lees-Milne, James (1985). Midway on the Waves. London: Faber & Faber. ISBN 0-571-14712-7.
- Taylor, D. J. (2007). Bright Young People: the lost generation of London's Jazz Age. New York: Farrar, Straus and Giroux. ISBN 978-0-374-53211-6. OCLC 428026658.
- Pryce-Jones, Alan (1987). The Bonus of Laughter. London: Hamish Hamilton Ltd. ISBN 0-241-11903-0.

=== Website ===
- Clark, Gregory (2023). "The Annual RPI and Average Earnings for Britain, 1209 to Present (New Series)". MeasuringWorth.

Baronetage of Great Britain
Preceded by Frederic Morgan	Baronet (of Tredegar); 1954–1962	Extinct
Peerage of the United Kingdom
Preceded by Frederic Morgan	Baron Tredegar; 1954–1962	Extinct
