= The Honourable John Morgan =

1949 painting by Leonard Fuller

- Artist: Leonard Fuller
- Year: 1949
- Medium: Oil on canvas
- Dimensions: 112 cm × 92 cm (44 in × 36 in)
- Location: Tredegar House
- Owner: On loan to the National Trust from Newport Museum and Galleries

The Honourable John Morgan is an oil on canvas painting by Leonard Fuller (1891–1973) from 1949. The subject is the Hon. John Morgan, later the sixth and last Baron Tredegar.

== History ==
The subject, the Hon. John Morgan, studied painting under Leonard Fuller in the 1930s at the St Ives School of Painting, established by Fuller and his wife in 1938. Morgan's study was only brief as at the outbreak of the Second World War in 1939 he took up a commission in the King's Own Scottish Borderers (KOSB).

The Morgans claimed descent from Welsh princes, and were among the most powerful families in South Wales. In May 1949, the Hon. John Morgan inherited the family's ancestral home, Tredegar House, Newport, and the 53,000-acre Tredegar Estate. Although the house and estate were eventually sold in the 1950s in lieu of enormous death-duties, for a time Morgan intended to "live at Tredegar House on a modest scale in view of the prevailing conditions", and as such commissioned Fuller to paint his portrait to be hung at the house. The painting was completed by October 1949, when it was displayed at the Royal Institute of Oil Painters in London (of which Fuller was a member). The painting is currently owned by Newport Museum and Galleries and is on loan to the National Trust as part of the Trust's 50-year lease of Tredegar House from Newport Council, where the painting is on display.

== Description ==
The painting is oil on canvas. It depicts the subject in three-quarter length, sitting cross-legged and with hands in his lap, and wearing dinner attire including a green velvet smoking jacket. The subject is seated within a light-panelled room with a Marie Antoinette decorative screen behind and to his left. An account from when the portrait was on display at the Royal Institute of Oil Painters in 1949 states that it is of Kit-Cat size, however while the painting is of three-quarter length, it is somewhat larger than the typical Kit-Cat dimensions. To the bottom right-hand corner is the artist's name.
