= Tredegar Estates Office =

Listed building in Newport, Wales

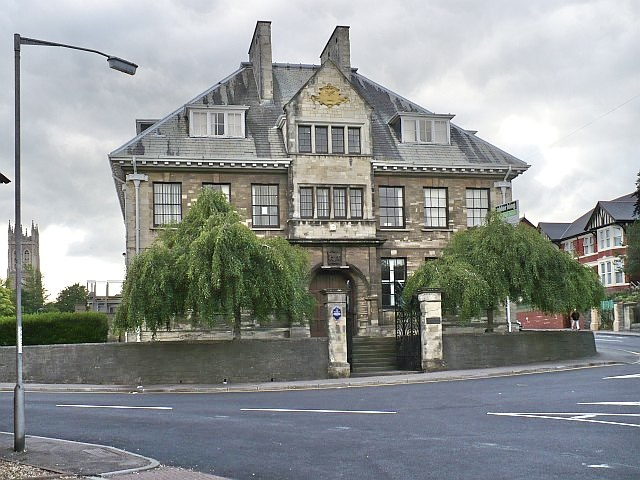
- "an impressively designed former estate office"
- Interactive map of the Tredegar Estates Office area

General information
- Type: Estates office
- Architectural style: Late 17th-century style
- Location: Newport, Wales, Wales
- Coordinates: 51°35′25″N 3°00′03″W
- Completed: 1906
- Client: Godfrey Morgan, 1st Viscount Tredegar

Listed Building – Grade II
- Official name: Newport Magistrates Court
- Designated: 2 May 1980; 45 years ago
- Reference no.: 3033

The Tredegar Estates Office (also referred to as Newport Magistrates Court) is a Grade II listed, early 20th-century building in the suburb of Allt-yr-yn, in Newport, Wales. (Note: The Tredegar Estates Office was located in the historic county of Monmouthshire but local government reorganisation in 1994 placed the property in the county borough of Newport.) From its construction until the mid-1950s, it was the primary office for the Tredegar Estates of the Morgan family, before being used as Newport Magistrates Court. As of 2026, it is split into office spaces to let.

== History ==
The building was commissioned by Godfrey Morgan, 1st Viscount Tredegar, as the office for the expansive Tredegar Estates of the Morgan family, some of the largest landowners in Wales, whose seat was the nearby Tredegar House in Coedkernew. Cadw gives the build dates as 1904-1906 and the designer as "J. F. Groves, architect to the Estate". The office housed deeds, leases, and rental or sale agreements for properties on the estate as well as detailed plans for farms on the estate including acreage of their fields. Tenants of the estate would visit the office to pay their rents at the Rent Office, situated to the right of the front door where there were staff operating from two counters. The office was also where pensioners who had served the Morgan family would collect their pensions provided by the Tredegar Estate.

In the 1950s, crippling death-duties on large estates forced John Morgan, later the sixth and final Lord Tredegar, to dispose of the family's interests in South Wales. This culminated in the sale of Tredegar House in 1951, and the Tredegar Estate (including Ruperra Castle and surrounding land) in 1956.

Following the dispersal of the Tredegar Estates in the 1950s, the building became the Newport Magistrates Court. A report in 2011 on the commencement of renovation work to the property said that it had been empty for around three years, and that it was planned to be converted into office spaces. As of 2026, following a process of renovation, the building is run as The Estates Office, an enterprise offering suites of offices within the building.

== Architecture ==
The building is constructed of local, grey ashlar stone. The roof is hipped. John Newman, in his Gwent/Monmouthshire volume in the Pevsner Buildings of Wales series, describes it as "like a little late 17th century country house". Over the main entrance door is the heraldic achievement of the Barons Tredegar carved in stone. The property was designated as a Grade II listed building on 2 May 1980 as the Newport Magistrates Court (its then use) as "an impressively designed former estate office, which has retained its original charter and detail". The entrance gates to the property were designated as Grade II listed on the same date as being of "group value with the Magistrates Court". See below plans for the building dating from around 1905.

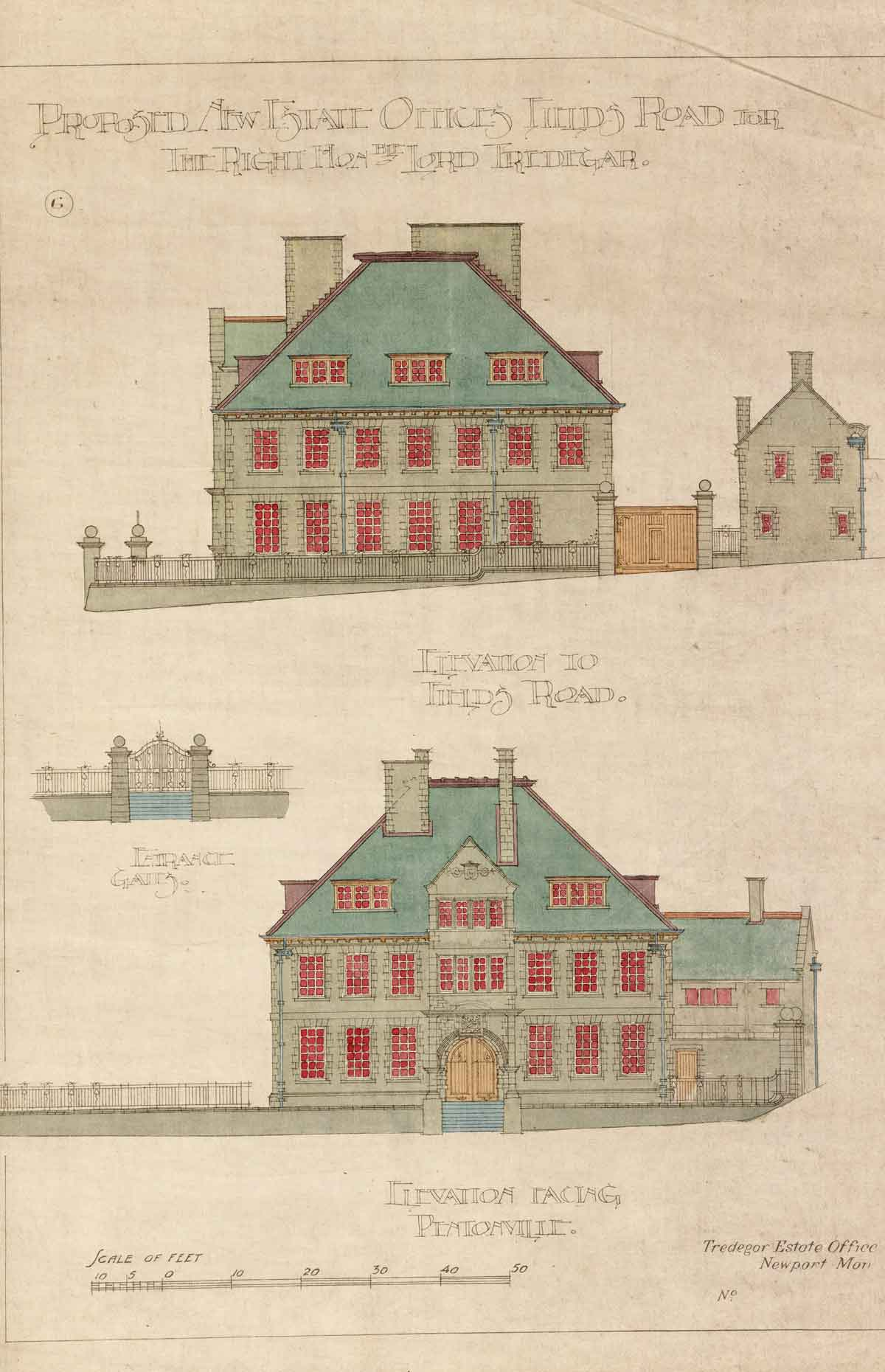
Plans for the "PROPOSED NEW ESTATE OFFICES FIELDS ROAD FOR THE RT. HONBLE. LORD TREDEGAR."

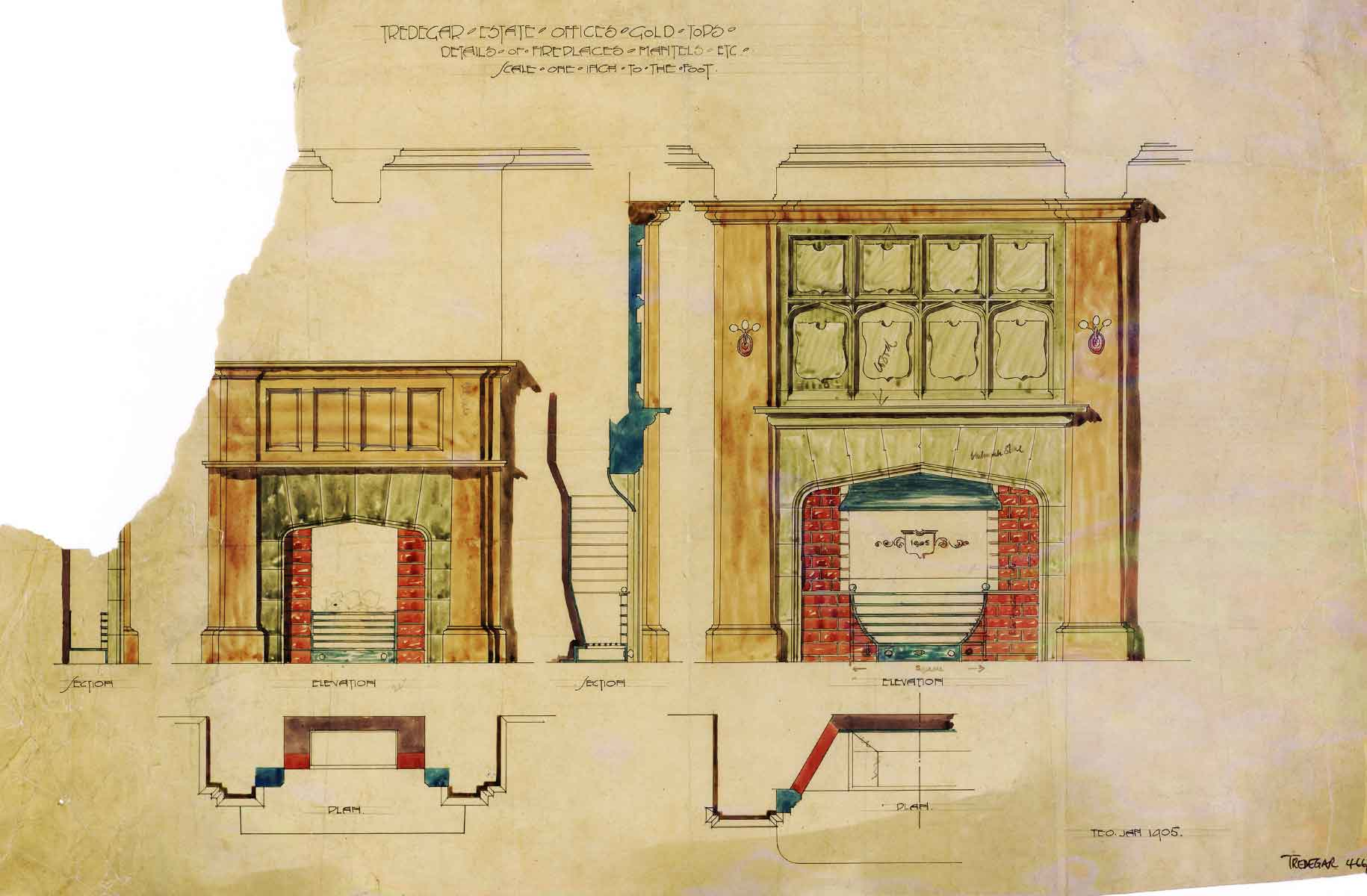
Plans for the "TREDEGAR ESTATE OFFICES GOLD TOPS. DETAILS OF FIREPLACES, MANTELS, ETC. SCALE ONE INCH TO THE FOOT."

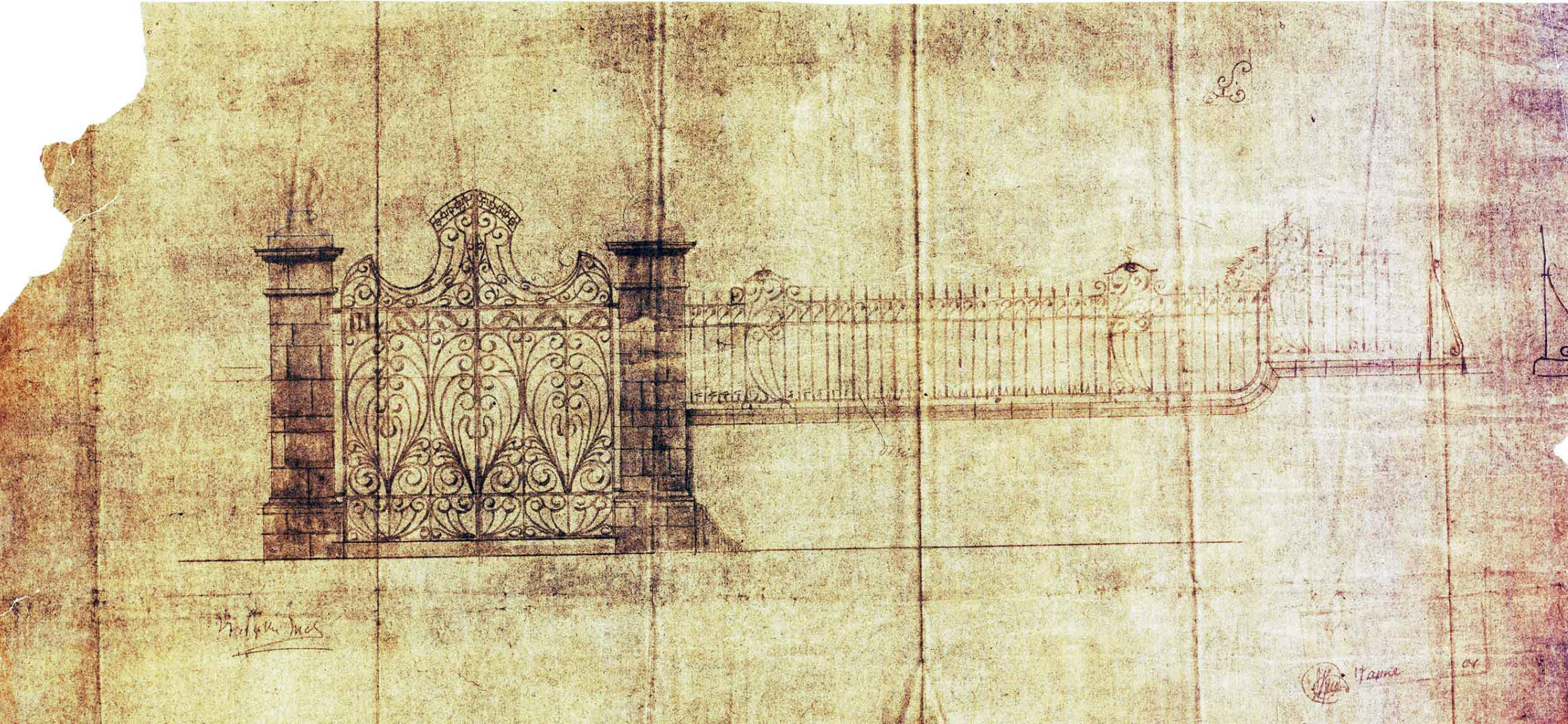
Plans for the entrance gates to, and fencing surrounding, the Tredegar Estates Office.

== See also ==
- A biography on the life and work of John Francis Groves (1861–1953), architect for the Tredegar Estates Office, from the Biographical Dictionary of British and Irish Architects 1800-1950.
