= Baron Tredegar =

Title in the Peerage of the United Kingdom

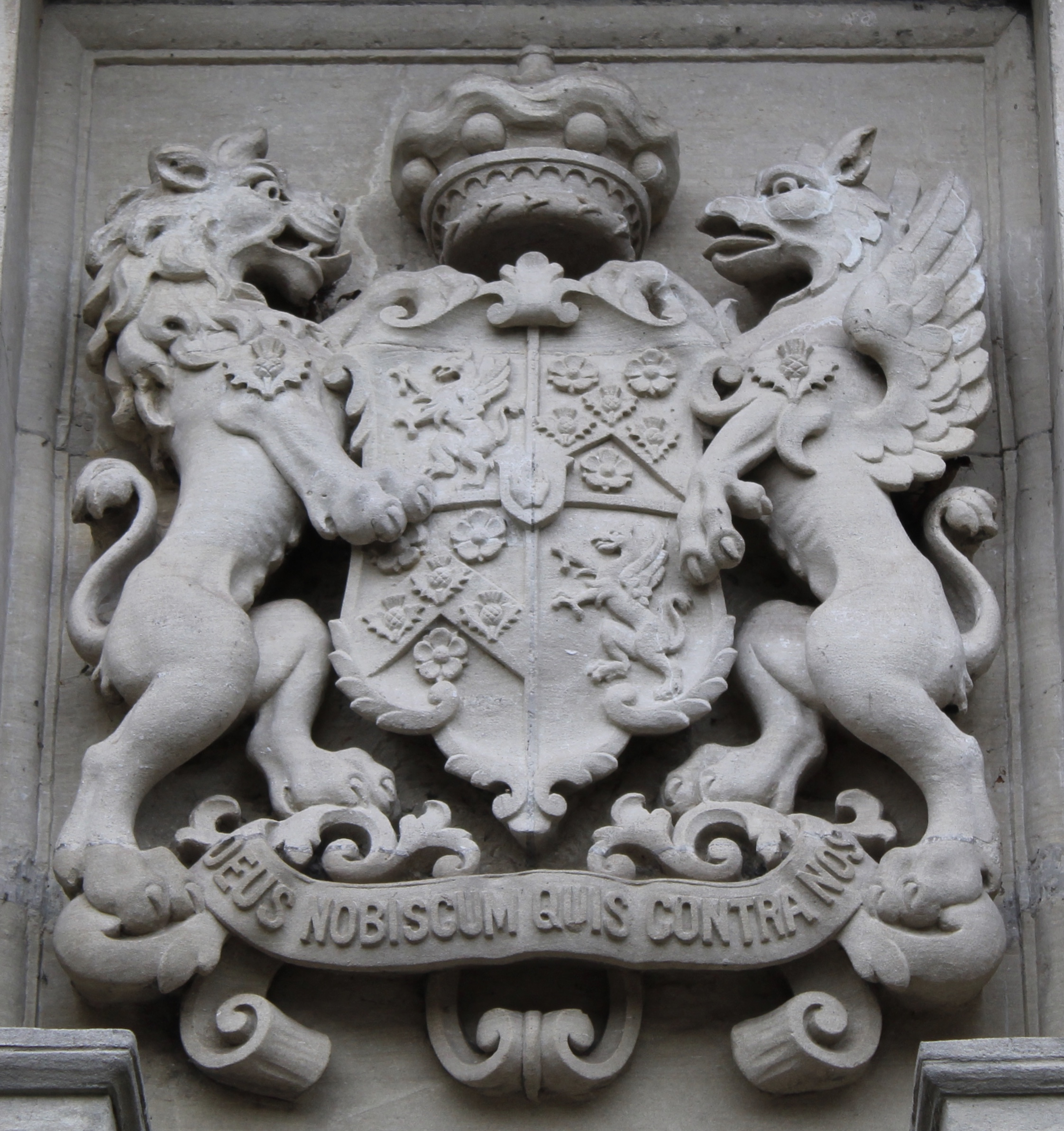
- Arms of the Barons Tredegar, carved above the entrance of the Tredegar Estates Office.
- Creation date: 16 April 1859
- Created by: Queen Victoria
- Peerage: Peerage of the United Kingdom
- First holder: Sir Charles Morgan, 3rd Baronet
- Last holder: John Morgan, 6th Baron Tredegar
- Status: Extinct
- Extinction date: 17 November 1962
- Former seats: Tredegar House, Ruperra Castle
- Motto: Si Deus Nobiscum quis contra nos (If God is with us, who is against us)

Baron Tredegar, of Tredegar in the County of Monmouth, was a title in the Peerage of the United Kingdom. It was created on 16 April 1859 for the Welsh politician Sir Charles Morgan, 3rd Baronet, who had earlier represented Brecon in Parliament. His eldest son, Charles Rodney Morgan, sat as Member of Parliament for Brecon, but predeceased his father. The first baron was therefore succeeded by his next eldest son, the second baron.

== Barons Tredegar ==
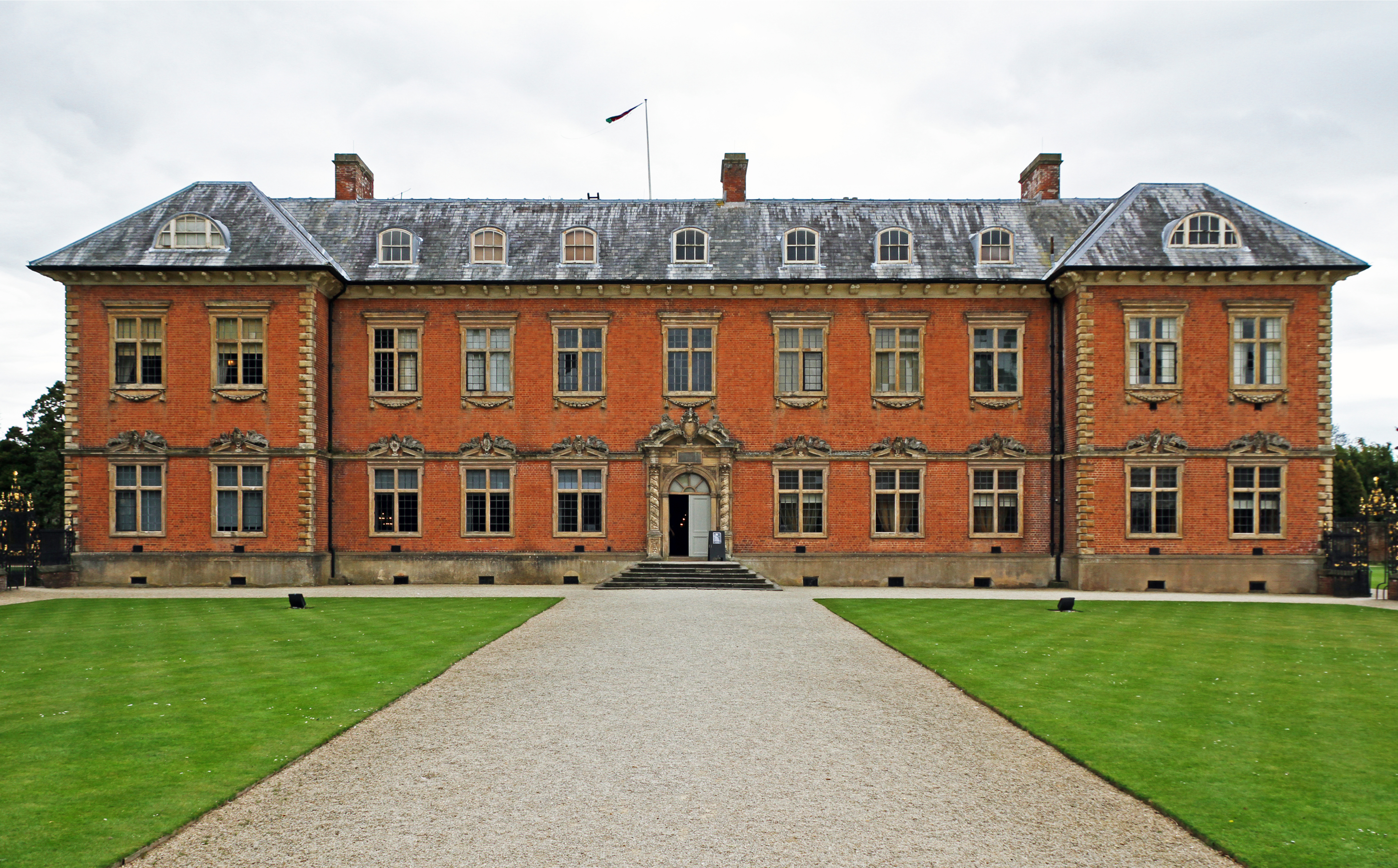
Tredegar House

Godfrey Charles Morgan was a politician and soldier, and notably commanded a section of the Light Brigade at the Battle of Balaclava during the Crimean War. Godfrey was 22 and Captain in the 17th Lancers. His horse, Sir Briggs, also survived, and lived at Tredegar House until his death at the age of 28. He was buried with full military honours in the Cedar Garden at the House. The monument still stands there today.

On 28 December 1905 he was created Viscount Tredegar, of Tredegar in the County of Monmouth, in the Peerage of the United Kingdom. He never married and the viscountcy became extinct on his death in 1913. He was succeeded in the baronetcy and barony by his nephew, Courtenay, the third Baron. He was the eldest son of the Hon. Frederic Courtenay Morgan, third son of the first Baron. On 4 August 1926 the viscountcy was revived when he was created Viscount Tredegar, of Tredegar in the County of Monmouth, in the Peerage of the United Kingdom. Lord Tredegar subsequently served as Lord-Lieutenant of Monmouthshire.

On his death in 1934, Courtenay was succeeded by his only son, Evan, who became the second viscount. The new Lord Tredegar, a poet and well-known eccentric, was homosexual despite two marriages. As a result, he died childless in 1949, and the viscountcy became extinct. He was succeeded in the barony and baronetcy by his elderly uncle, Frederic, who became the fifth Baron. He was a younger son of the aforementioned the Hon. Frederic Courtenay Morgan. Due to lack of estate planning on Evan's death, Frederic inherited a large inheritance tax bill. To avoid a reoccurrence in the event of his own demise, Frederic passed the estates immediately to his son, John, who on his father's death in 1954 became the sixth and final Baron Tredegar, dying childless in 1962.

== History of the Morgan family ==
The Morgan family descended from William Morgan, Member of Parliament for Monmouthshire. His eldest son Thomas Morgan was Member of Parliament for Brecon and Monmouthshire. All Thomas's children predeceased him and he left his estates to his younger brother John Morgan (1670-1720), who sat as Member of Parliament for Monmouthshire and served as Lord-Lieutenant of Breconshire and Monmouthshire. John also succeeded to the estate of his uncle and namesake, John Morgan (d. 1715), High Sheriff of Monmouthshire in 1697 and Member of Parliament for Monmouth, a merchant who had amassed a great fortune in London.

John's eldest son Sir William Morgan was Member of Parliament for Monmouthshire from 1722 to 1731. William's eldest son William Morgan sat as Member of Parliament for Monmouthshire from 1747 to 1763. His uncle Thomas Morgan (the son of John Morgan), known as "the General", was Member of Parliament for Brecon, Monmouthshire and Breconshire and served as Judge Advocate General from 1741 to 1768. His eldest son Thomas Morgan was Member of Parliament for Brecon and Monmouthshire. His younger brother Charles Morgan sat as Member of Parliament for Brecon and Breconshire. His younger brother John Morgan of Dderw was Member of Parliament for Brecon and Monmouthshire. On his death the male line of the Morgan family failed. His sister and heiress Jane Morgan married Charles Gould. He sat as Member of Parliament for Brecon and Breconshire and served as Judge Advocate General from 1768 to 1806. He was knighted in 1779 and created a baronet, of Tredegar in the County of Monmouth, in the Baronetage of Great Britain on 30 October 1792.

The day after his elevation to a baronetcy he assumed by Royal licence the surname of Morgan in lieu of his patronymic. He was succeeded by his eldest son, the second Baronet. He was a Lieutenant-Colonel in the British Army and served as Commander-in-Chief of the West Indies. He was succeeded by his eldest son, the aforementioned third Baronet, who was elevated to the peerage in 1859. See above for further history of the baronetcy.

Octavius Morgan, fourth son of the second Baronet, was a politician, historian and antiquary.

== Title holders ==
=== Morgan baronets, of Tredegar (1792) ===
- Sir Charles Gould Morgan, 1st Baronet (1726–1806)
- Sir Charles Morgan, 2nd Baronet (1760–1846)
- Sir Charles Morgan Robinson Morgan, 3rd Baronet (1792–1875) (created Baron Tredegar in 1859)

=== Baron Tredegar (1859) ===
- Charles Morgan Robinson Morgan, 1st Baron Tredegar (1792–1875)
- Godfrey Charles Morgan, 2nd Baron Tredegar (1831–1913) (created Viscount Tredegar in 1905)

=== Viscounts Tredegar; First creation (1905) ===
- Godfrey Charles Morgan, 1st Viscount Tredegar (1831–1913)

=== Baron Tredegar (1859; Reverted) ===
- Courtenay Charles Evan Morgan, 3rd Baron Tredegar (1867–1934) (created Viscount Tredegar in 1926)

=== Viscounts Tredegar; Second creation (1926) ===
- Courtenay Charles Evan Morgan, 1st Viscount Tredegar (1867–1934)
- Evan Frederic Morgan, 2nd Viscount Tredegar (1893–1949)

=== Baron Tredegar (1859; reverted) ===
- Frederic George Morgan, 5th Baron Tredegar (1873–1954)
- (Frederic Charles) John Morgan, 6th Baron Tredegar (1908–1962)

== Line of succession ==
- Sir Charles Gould Morgan, 1st Baronet (1726-1806)
  - Sir Charles Gould Morgan, 2nd Baronet (1760-1846)
    - Charles Morgan Robinson Morgan, 1st Baron Tredegar (1792-1875)
      - Godfrey Charles Morgan, 1st Viscount Tredegar (1831-1913)
      - The Hon. Frederic Courtenay Morgan (1834-1909)
        - Courtenay Charles Evan Morgan, 1st Viscount Tredegar (1867–1934)
          - Evan Frederic Morgan, 2nd Viscount Tredegar (1893–1949)
        - Frederic George Morgan, 5th Baron Tredegar (1873–1954)
          - (Frederic Charles) John Morgan, 6th Baron Tredegar (1908–1962)

== Gallery ==
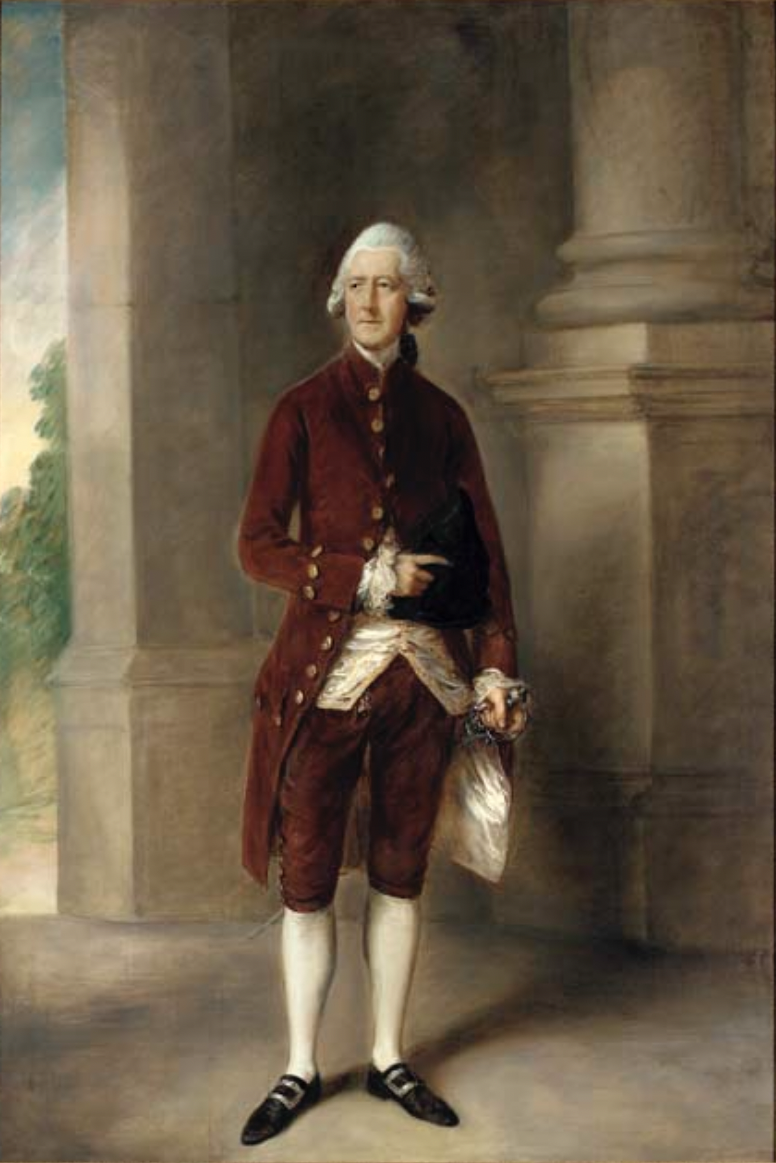
Portrait of Sir Charles Gould-Morgan, 1st Baronet, by Thomas Gainsborough, 1782. Sold in 2005 for £624,000.

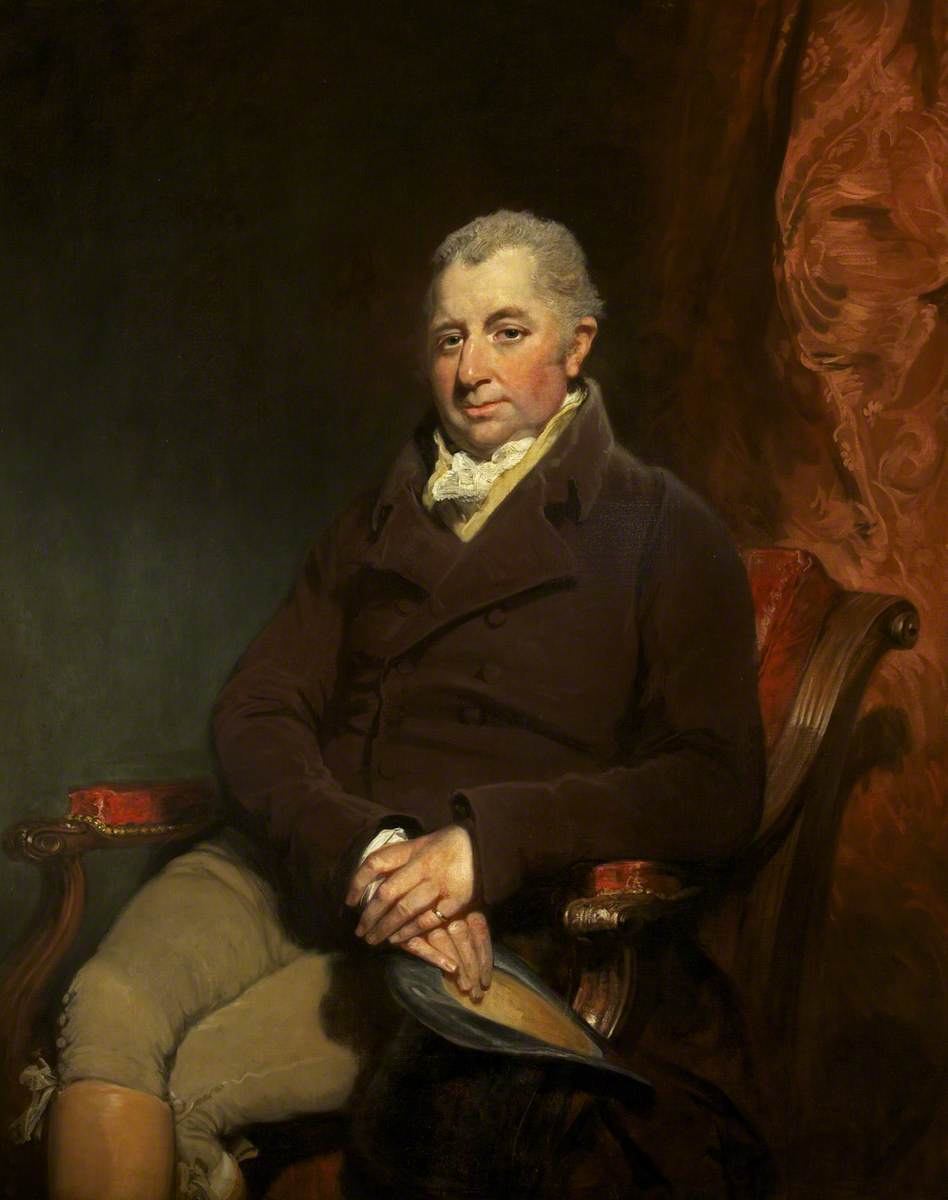
Portrait of Sir Charles Morgan, 2nd Baronet, by William Owen, 1810.

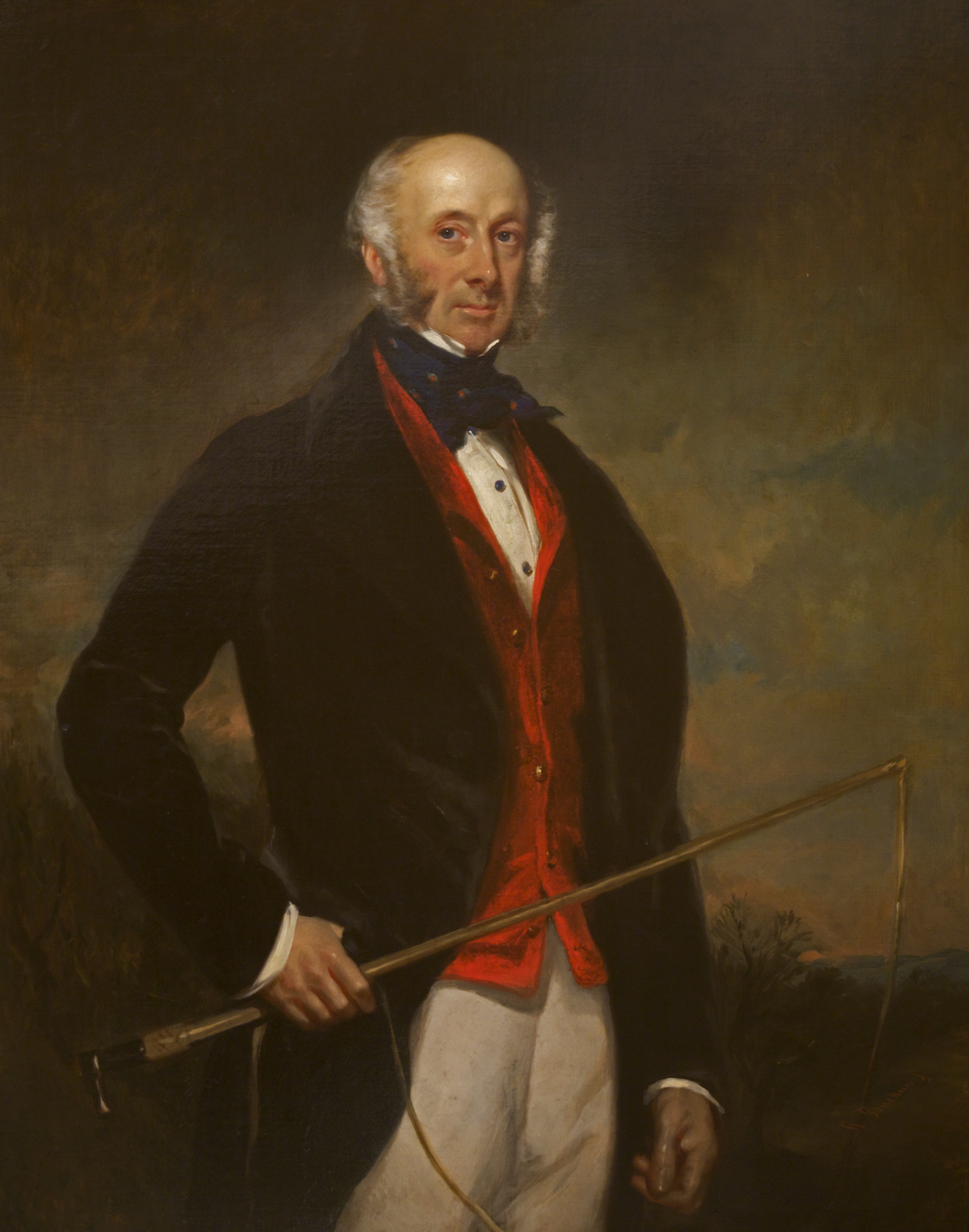
Portrait of Charles Morgan, 1st Baron Tredegar, by Richard Buckner, unknown date.

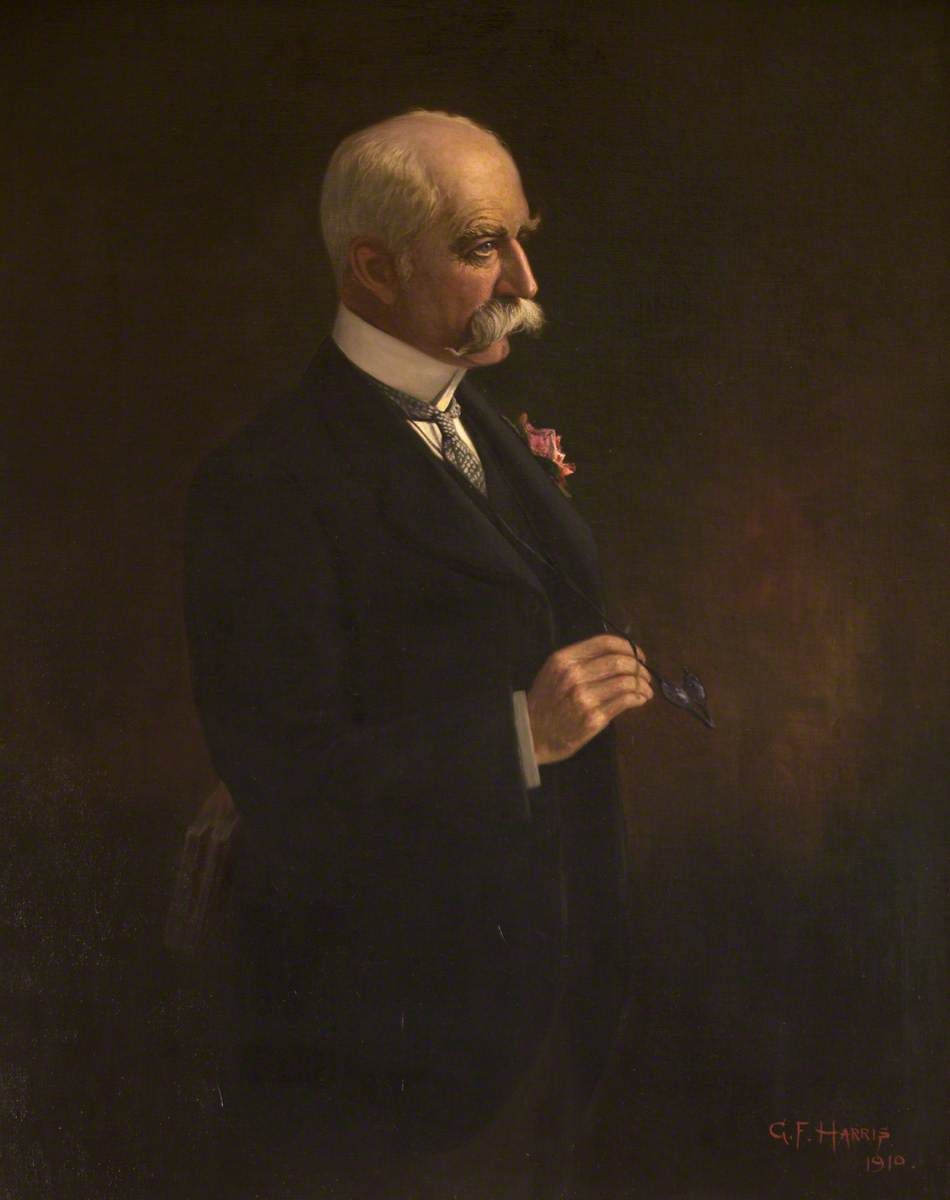
Portrait of Godfrey Morgan, 1st Viscount Tredegar, by George F. Harris, 1910.

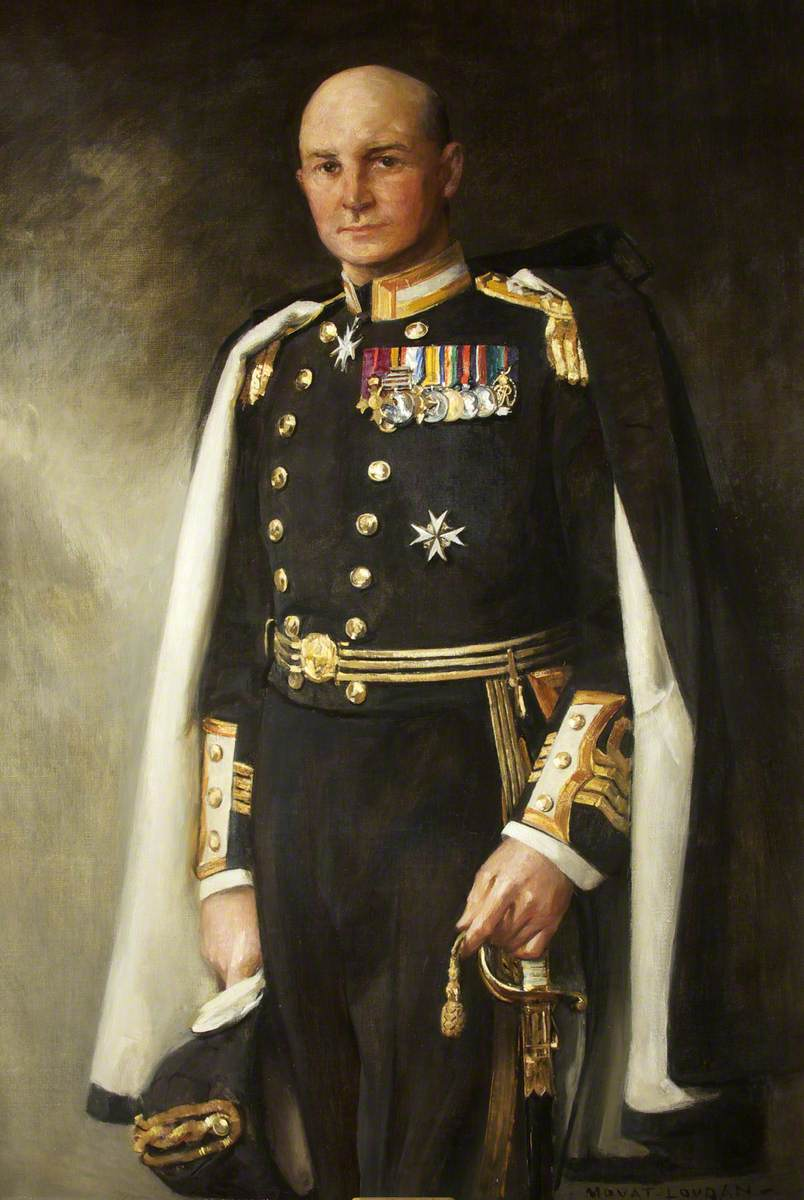
Portrait of Courtenay Morgan, 1st Viscount Tredegar, by William Loudan, 1924.

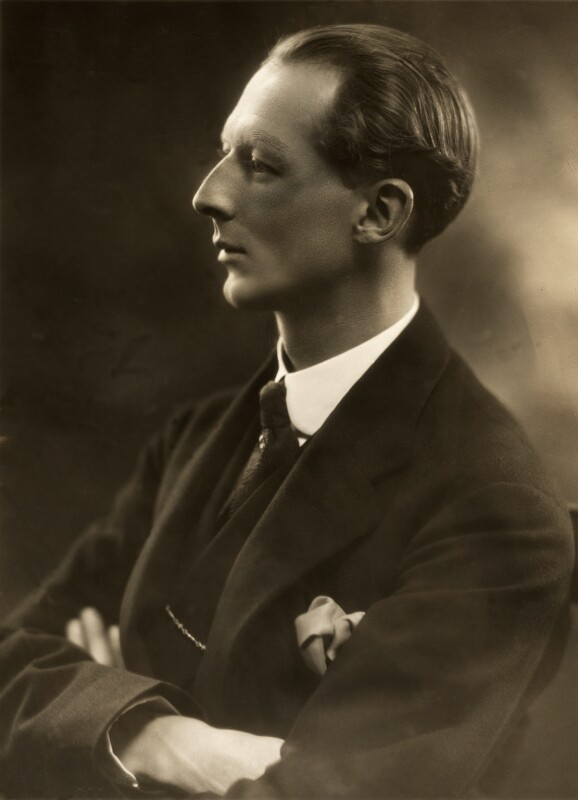
Photograph of Evan Morgan, 2nd Viscount Tredegar, by Bassano, 1923.

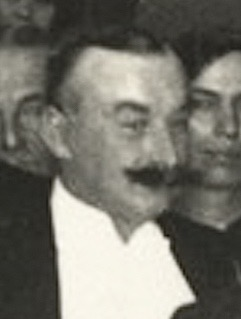
Photograph of Frederic Morgan, 5th Baron Tredegar from around 1920.

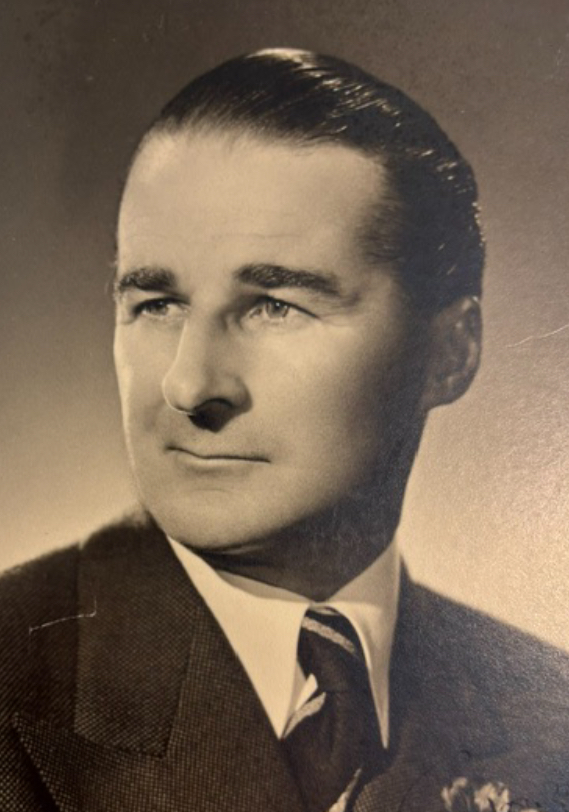
Photograph of John Morgan, 6th Baron Tredegar, by Bassano, 1949.

== See also ==
- Tredegarville
- Tredegar

== Sources ==
- Kidd, Charles, ed. (1903). Debrett's peerage, baronetage, knightage, and companionage. London: Dean and son. p. 854.

Baronetage of Great Britain
Preceded by Shore baronets	Gould baronets of Tredegar; 15 November 1792	Succeeded by Manners baronets
