= Boughrood Castle =

Country house in Glasbury

Coordinates: 52°02′34″N 3°15′58″W

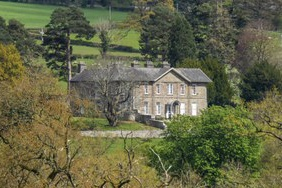
- Photographed from afar in 2024.
- Interactive map of the Boughrood Castle area

General information
- Type: Country house
- Architectural style: Late Georgian
- Location: Glasbury, in Powys, Wales
- Completed: c.1817
- Client: Francis Fowke

Listed Building – Grade II
- Official name: Boughrood Castle
- Designated: 18 September 1960; 65 years ago
- Reference no.: 8735

Boughrood Castle is a Grade II listed, 19th-century country house in the community of Glasbury, in Powys, Wales. (Note: Boughrood Castle was located in the historic county of Radnorshire, but local government reorganisation in 1994 placed the site in the county of Powys.)

== History ==
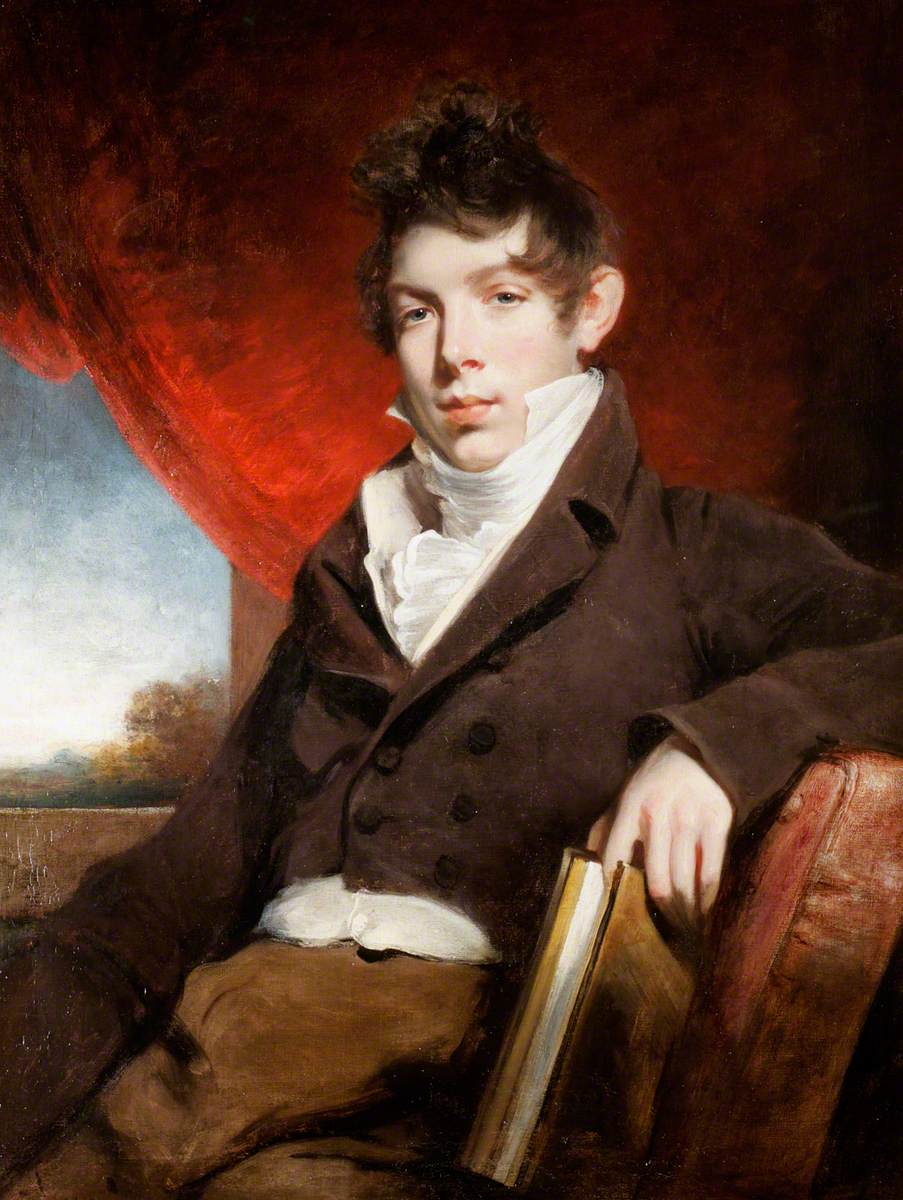
Francis Fowke (1753–1819) painted by John Opie.

The current building is constructed near the site of the original motte and bailey Boughrood Castle, which was probably built around the 12th-century. (Note: In his Powys: Montgomeryshire, Radnorshire and Breconshire volume in the Pevsner Buildings of Wales series, Richard Haslam states that the site of the original Boughrood Castle is a ditched tump beside Castle Farm, once the home farm for the 19th-century Boughrood Castle and situated to its rear.) The current house was built by Francis Fowke Snr. (1753–1819) in 1817. It is believed that Fowke corruptly made over £70,000 (Note: £70,000 in 1819 equates to approximately £5,305,000 in 2025, according to calculations based on the Consumer Price Index measure of inflation.) from bribes, army contracting and opium dealing while in the service of the East India Company in Bengal. On Fowke's death, the house was inherited by his son, Francis Jnr. (b. 1789). Debts accumulated by subsequent members of the family resulted in the sale of the house and surrounding Boughrood land in the early 1830s to Walter Wilkins Snr. (later de Winton) of nearby Maesllwch Castle. The Imperial Gazetteer of England & Wales 1870 lists his son, Walter Jnr. (1832–1878), as residing at the house at the time of publication. Walter de Winton Jnr. was succeeded by his son, Major Walter de Winton (c.1868–1935), who let the house to several occupiers during his tenure.

From at least 1908, the house was occupied by Frederic Morgan, who became justice of the peace for Brecon and Radnor in 1909, and his family. Morgan was a keen angler who used the nearby River Wye for salmon fishing. The family used the grounds of the house to host the annual Boughrood Flower Show, and during the First World War, Morgan's wife, Dorothy, used the home farm as a hospital for sick and wounded soldiers; as of March 1915, six men were being treated there. The Morgans left the house in around 1920.

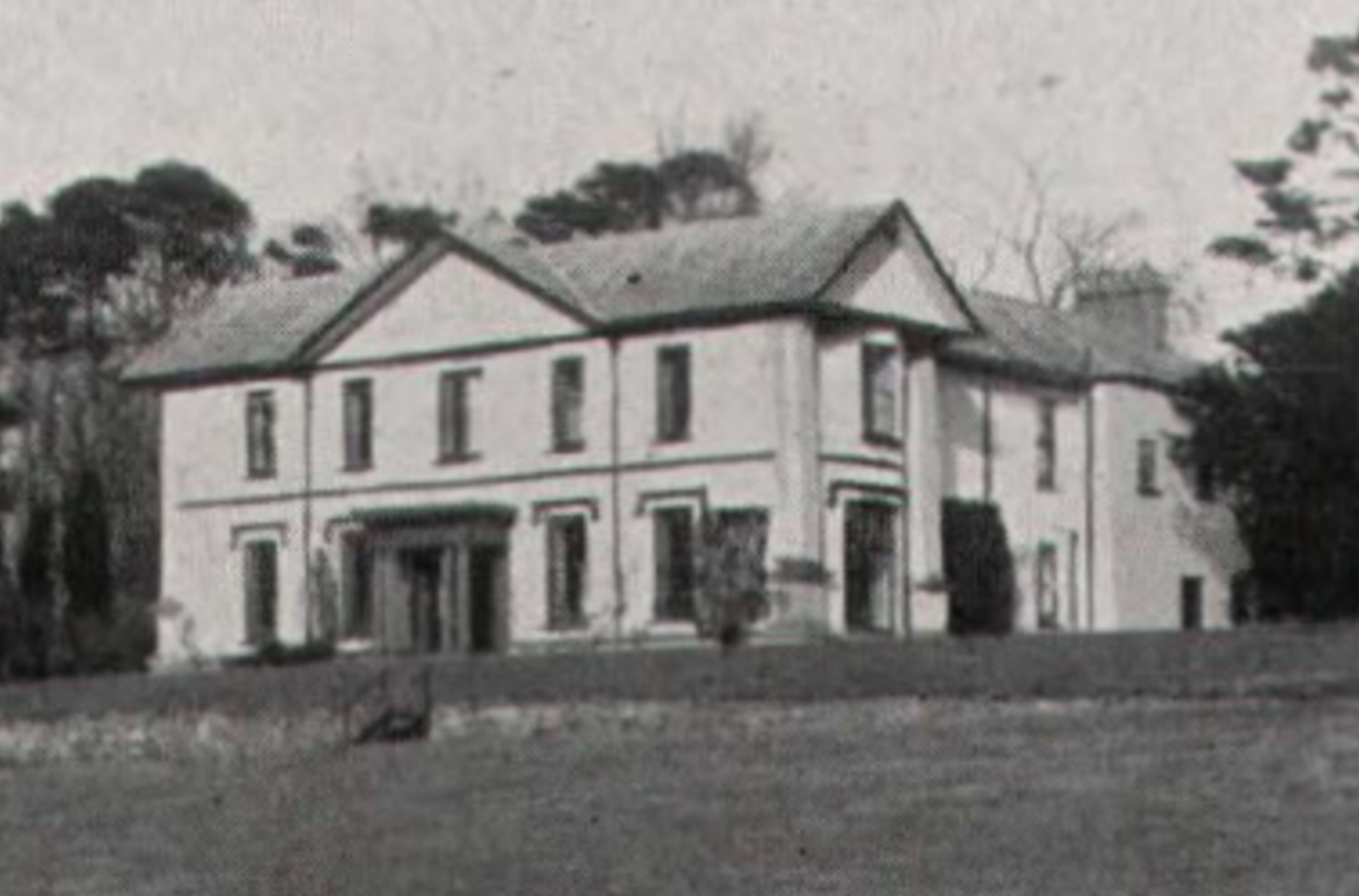
A photograph featured in Country Life, advertising the house for sale in 1921.

In May 1921, the freehold of the house and surrounding land, combined totalling around 79-acres, was sold at auction by the Messrs George Trollops and Sons under the direction of Major Walter de Winton to Sir Laurence Phillips of the nearby Llanstephan House for £15,100. (Note: £15,100 in 1921 equates to approximately £639,000 in 2025, according to calculations based on the Consumer Price Index measure of inflation.) In November 1921, Sir Laurence directed the Messrs Knight, Frank and Rutley to sell the freehold at auction once again, this time with only around 60-acres of surrounding land.

From 1931 to 1950, the house was owned by Sir Harmood Harmood-Banner (1876–1950). Following his death, the freehold of the house and around 47-acres of surrounding land was offered for sale by auction as a whole or in five lots by the Messrs Knight, Frank and Rutley in conjunction with the Messrs Stanley, Moss and Pilcher.

Between around 1970 and 1974, the house was owned by Michael Howard (1923–1974), a publisher and son of Wren Howard. In around 1973, David Gentleman was commissioned by Howard's colleagues to paint the house as a present for him. According to an obituary in The Bookseller, Howard and his wife offered the house for sale in 1974, but he died before a buyer could be found.

In 2023, the house was offered for sale for £2,400,000.

== Architecture ==
A Cadw report for the property states that some masonry from the original castle stood until, and was probably used in, the construction of the house. A Cadw report for the original castle itself builds on this, stating that the masonry may have been used as part of the garden of the house. In his Powys: Montgomeryshire, Radnorshire and Breconshire volume in the Pevsner Buildings of Wales series, Richard Haslam gives the property as probably being to Francis Fowke's own designs. Fowke's original construction of the house featured battlements to its roof, but these were removed by his son, Francis Jnr. (b. 1789), during remodelling work in 1820. The remodelling also included the extension of rooms into two-storey bays facing roughly west and east, the addition of stone pediments to the south façade and to the west and east gable extensions. The house remained largely unaltered until 1929, when the south porch and east doorway were altered, and the stucco was stripped; this is how the house appears today. The house was designated as a Grade II listed building on 18 September 1960 as a "good example of a late Georgian country house".

== Sources ==
- Clark, Gregory (2023). "The Annual RPI and Average Earnings for Britain, 1209 to Present (New Series)". MeasuringWorth.
