= Courtenay Morgan, 1st Viscount Tredegar =

Welsh peer (1867–1934)

The Right Honourable The Lord Tredegar CBE, KStJ, VD
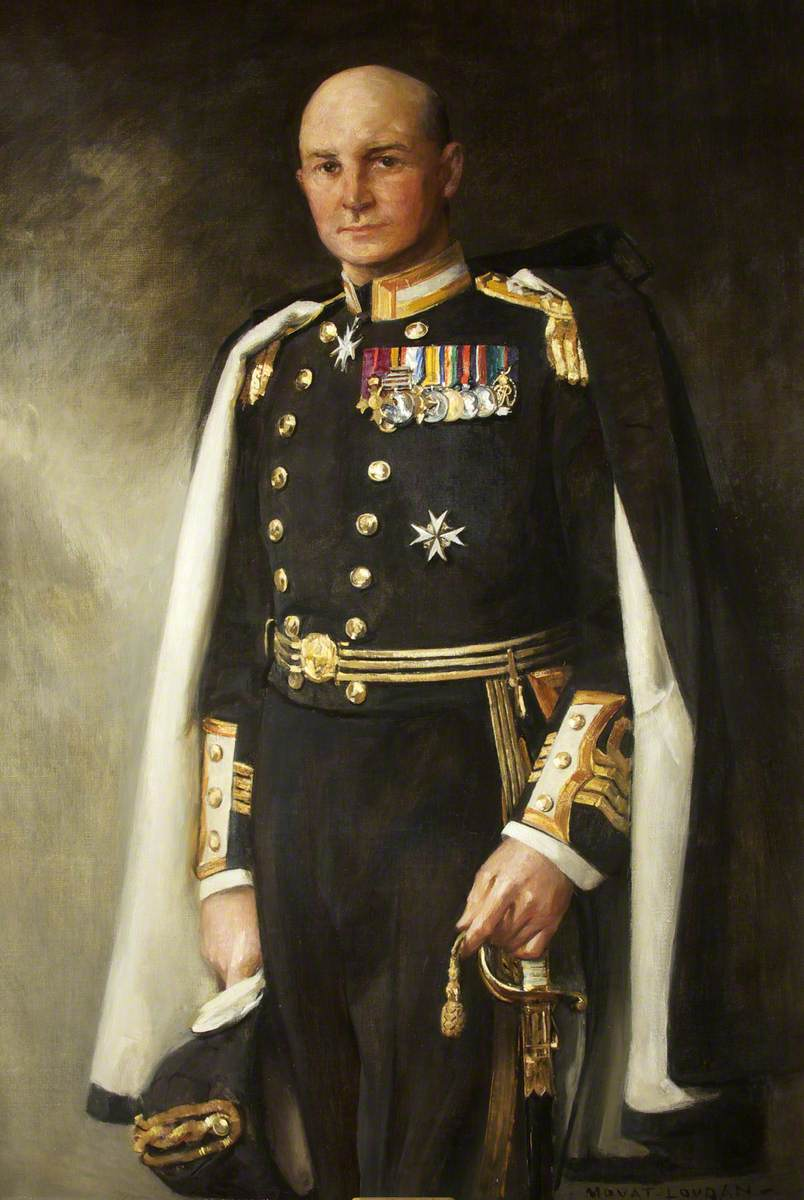

Lord Lieutenant of Monmouthshire
- In office 1933–1934
- Preceded by: The Lord Treowen
- Succeeded by: Sir Henry Mather-Jackson, Bt

Personal details
- Born: Courtenay Charles Evan Morgan; 10 April 1867 Ruperra Castle, Newport, Monmouthshire
- Died: 3 May 1934 (aged 67) Ritz Hotel, Westminster
- Spouse: Lady Katharine Carnegie (m. 1890–1934)
- Children: Evan Morgan, 2nd Viscount Tredegar; Gwyneth Ericka Morgan
- Parent(s): Frederick Courtenay Morgan; Charlotte Anne Williamson
- Education: Eton College

Courtenay Charles Evan Morgan, 1st Viscount Tredegar, CBE, KStJ, VD (10 April 1867 – 3 May 1934), was a Welsh peer.

== Early life ==
Morgan was born on 10 April 1867 at Ruperra Castle near Newport, Monmouthshire. He was the eldest son of the Hon. Frederick Courtenay Morgan (third son of Charles Morgan, 1st Baron Tredegar) and the former Charlotte Anne Williamson (a daughter of Charles Alexander Williamson, of Lawers, Perthshire).

He was educated at Eton College

== Career ==
Tredegar was commissioned in the Royal Monmouthshire Royal Engineers in 1884, appointed a captain in the Royal Monmouthshire Royal Engineers on 30 December 1891, and was later promoted an honorary major in 1900. In early 1900 he was Aide-de-camp to Sir Thomas Fraser, Commandant Royal School of Military Engineering at Chatham and Commanding the Thames District. He then served on the staff in South Africa during the Second Boer War in 1900-1901. He was promoted lieutenant-colonel in 1903. In 1911 he was appointed honorary colonel of the 1st battalion of the Monmouthshire Regiment.

Besides Ruperra Castle, Tredegar also lived in Shropshire at Ashford Court in Ashford Carbonell prior to succeeding to the barony. He was a minor cricketer who played at county level for Shropshire between 1896 and 1898 while playing at club level for Ludlow, and he hunted, becoming joint master of the Tredegar Fox Hounds.

In the 1906 General Election he unsuccessfully stood as Conservative candidate for South Monmouthshire, losing the seat to the Liberals in a national landslide for that party.

One of Lord Tredegar's first acts after his succession was to purchase the steam yacht Liberty, which almost immediately was requisitioned by the Royal Navy for use as a hospital ship. He left his home and went back to serve in the First World War, taking command of his yacht for the first part of the war. He was granted the temporary rank of lieutenant in the Royal Naval Volunteer Reserve, soon promoted to temporary commander. After the end of hostilities, he embarked on a world cruise, eventually going around the world twice during which he visited every colony in the British Empire and every state in the Commonwealth of Australia.

Tredegar was promoted to captain in the RNVR in 1921, appointed a Commander of the Order of the British Empire (CBE) in the 1925 Birthday Honours, and appointed a naval aide-de-camp to the King in 1925, but was placed on the retired list in 1926.

In 1913, he succeeded to his grandfather's barony upon the death of his uncle, Godfrey Morgan, 1st Viscount Tredegar. In the 1926 Birthday Honours the viscountcy was revived when he was created Viscount Tredegar, of Tredegar in the County of Monmouth. He is not recorded as having spoken in the House of Lords. In 1933 he was appointed Lord Lieutenant of Monmouthshire, a post he held until his death the following year.

== Personal life ==
Lord Tredegar married Lady Katharine Agnes Blanche, daughter of James Carnegie, 9th Earl of Southesk, in 1890. He died in May 1934, aged 67, at the Ritz Hotel in Westminster, London after his return from a health trip to Australia.

He is buried in the Morgan family plot at the Church of St Basil, Bassaleg, near Newport, Wales. He was succeeded in the viscountcy and ownership of Tredegar House by his eccentric and bohemian son, Evan Morgan, 2nd Viscount Tredegar. His widow, Katharine, Viscountess Tredegar died in London in 1949, only a few months after her son Evan. The Hon. Gwyneth Ericka Morgan, only daughter of Courtenay and Katharine, died in mysterious circumstances. She went missing in December 1924 and is thought to have died then: her body was found floating in the Thames in May 1925. She is believed to have overdosed in a Limehouse opium den, whose proprietors then dumped her body.

== Election results ==
General Election 1906: South Monmouthshire
Party	Candidate	Votes	%	±%
Liberal	Ivor Herbert	7,503	54.7	N/A
Conservative	Courtenay Morgan	6,216	45.3	N/A
Majority		1,287	9.4	N/A
Turnout		13,719	86.5	N/A
Registered electors		15,858		
Liberal gain from Conservative		Swing	N/A	

Honorary titles
Preceded by The Lord Treowen	Lord Lieutenant of Monmouthshire; 1933–1934	Succeeded by Sir Henry Mather-Jackson, Bt
Peerage of the United Kingdom
New creation Previously made extinct in 1913	Viscount Tredegar; 1926–1934	Succeeded by Evan Frederic Morgan
Preceded by Godfrey Charles Morgan	Baron Tredegar; 1913–1934	Succeeded by Evan Frederic Morgan
