= Alan Pryce-Jones =

British writer

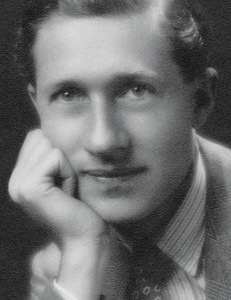
Alan Payan Pryce-Jones

Lt-Col. Alan Payan Pryce-Jones TD (18 November 1908 – 22 January 2000) was a British book critic, writer, journalist and Liberal Party politician. He was notably editor of The Times Literary Supplement from 1948 to 1959.

== Background ==
Pryce-Jones was the son of Henry Morris Pryce-Jones, CB, CVO, DSO, MC and Marion Vere Payan Dawnay. His grandfather was the merchant entrepreneur Sir Pryce Pryce-Jones of Montgomeryshire. Alan was educated at Eton and Magdalen College, Oxford. In 1934 he married Therese "Poppy" Fould-Springer (2 May 1914 – 13 February 1953), a daughter of Baron Eugène Fould-Springer, a French-born banker, and great-granddaughter of Baron Max Springer. In 1968 he married Mrs Mary Jean Kempner Thorne.

== Professional career ==
Pryce-Jones was assistant editor, The London Mercury, 1928–32. He served in the war of 1939–45 in France, Italy and Austria. He was editor, The Times Literary Supplement, 1948–59, book critic for the New York Herald Tribune, 1963–66, the World Journal Tribune, 1967–68, Newsday, 1969–71, and theatre critic for Theatre Arts from 1963. He was director, Old Vic Trust, 1950–61, He was a member of Council, Royal College of Music, 1956–61, and program associate, The Humanities and Arts Program, Ford Foundation, New York, 1961–63.

== Political career ==
Pryce-Jones joined the Liberal Party in 1937 in response to the party's stance against Nazi Germany fashioned by party leader Sir Archibald Sinclair and supported by Winston Churchill whom he admired. He became vice-president of the St Marylebone Liberal Association and not long after he was adopted as Prospective Liberal Parliamentary Candidate for Louth in Lincolnshire, in succession to Margaret Wintringham. who had been adopted as candidate at Gainsborough. However, his political career was cut short by the outbreak of the Second World War.

He was a trustee of the National Portrait Gallery, 1950–61.

== Publications ==
- The Spring Journey, 1931
- People in the South, 1932
- Beethoven, (Duckworth Great Lives) 1933
- 27 Poems, 1935
- Private Opinion, 1936
- Prose Literature 1945-1950, 1951
- Nelson, An Opera in Three Acts, (with Lennox Berkeley) 1954
- editor The New Outline of Modern Knowledge, 1956
- editor New Voices (Hulton Pocket Poets) 1959
- editor Georgian Poets (Hulton Pocket Poets) 1959
- Vanity Fair, a musical play, (with Robin Miller and Julian Slade) 1962
- The Bonus of Laughter, (autobiography) 1987
- Devoid of Shyness: From the Journal 1926-1939, (edited by John Byrne) 2015
