= Ruperra Castle =

Manor house and mock castle in Wales

- Castell Rhiw'r Perrai
- Lower Machen, Caerphilly, Wales
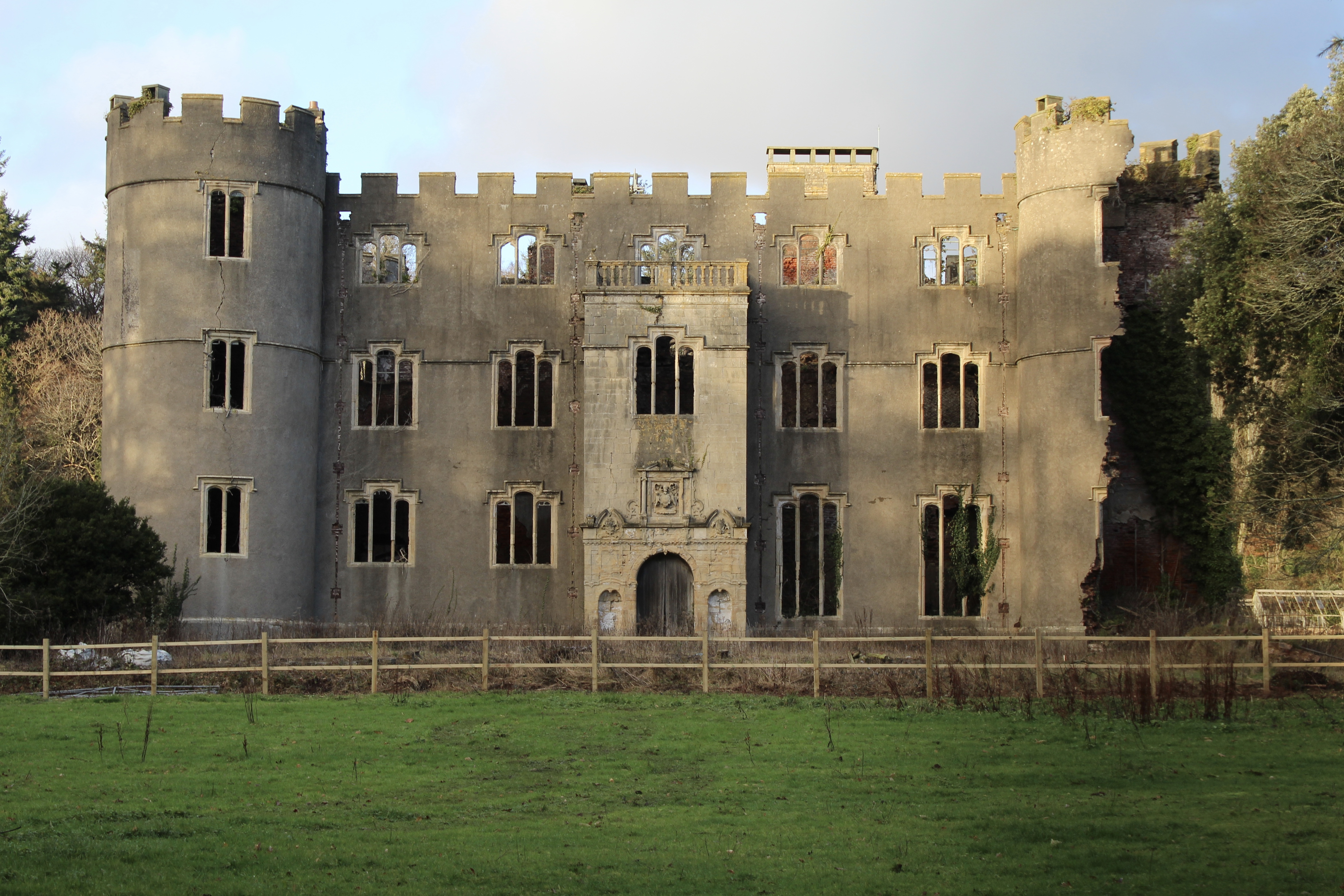
- Ruperra Castle in 2026

Site information
- Type: Manor House, mock Castle
- Website: www.ruperracastle.wales

Location
- Coordinates: 51.5703°N 3.1271°W

Site history
- Built: 1626
- Built by: Thomas Morgan

Listed Building – Grade II*
- Official name: Ruperra Castle
- Designated: 8 May 1964; 62 years ago
- Reference no.: 14069

Scheduled monument
- Official name: Ruperra Castle
- Designated: 2 September 1976; 49 years ago
- Reference no.: GM379

Cadw/ICOMOS Register of Parks and Gardens of Special Historic Interest in Wales
- Official name: Ruperra Castle
- Designated: 1 February 2022; 4 years ago
- Reference no.: PGW(Gm)17(CAE)
- Listing: Grade II

Ruperra Castle or Rhiwperra Castle (Welsh: Castell Rhiw'r Perrai) is a Grade II* Listed building and Scheduled Ancient Monument, situated in Lower Machen in the county borough of Caerphilly, Wales. Built in 1626, the castle is in a ruinous condition as at 2023. Its grounds are listed on the Cadw/ICOMOS Register of Parks and Gardens of Special Historic Interest in Wales.

== Morgan ownership ==
Built in 1626 by Sir Thomas Morgan, Steward to the Earl of Pembroke, it was one of the first of the mock castles to be built in Wales. King Charles I spent two nights at Ruperra Castle in 1645 shortly after the Battle of Naseby. Resultantly the royal coat of arms was added to the decoration on the South Porch, and the present public footpath from Rudry to the Castle is still known as "King's Drive".

It was bought as his home by wealthy John Morgan "the merchant" for 12,400 pounds. He was unmarried and it was consolidated on his death in 1715 into the Tredegar estates of the Morgan family.

It was destroyed by fire in 1785, and rebuilt, resultantly becoming home, especially in the 19th century, to the heir of the estate. Godfrey Morgan, who was the second son of the 1st Baron Tredegar, was born at Ruperra, and went on to survive the Charge of the Light Brigade. It was during his tenure of Ruperra that he undertook significant development, adding three new lodges as well as in 1826 a now listed iron bridge, allowing a carriage way through Coed Craig Ruperra and across the Rhymney River to Lower Machen Church, where the family and their servants attended Sunday services.

After the death of army officer turned politician Colonel Frederic Morgan in 1909, his eldest son Courtenay Morgan, 1st Viscount Tredegar, embarked on a programme of refurbishment. Minor adjustments were made to the main house, but his major improvement was the building of a new stable block to replace the one destroyed by fire in 1895, a new reservoir and pump house in the deer park, and a new power house fitted with duplicate steam-driven generators, dynamos and boilers. The 1840s brewhouse, laundry and dairy range were converted to accommodate the estate's staff.

As Courtenay also succeeded to his uncle's estates in 1913, taking up residence at Tredegar House, his son, Evan Morgan (later the second Viscount Tredegar), became a potential occupier of the property. A poet and noted eccentric with links to Aldous Huxley, Lord Alfred Douglas, Augustus John, Nancy Cunard and H. G. Wells, Evan preferred his London home, leaving Ruperra to deteriorate. Having grown up at Ruperra, Evan Morgan allegedly refused to sell it to William Randolph Hearst, whose lover, the actress Marion Davies, wanted a home in South Wales.

By 1935, the Morgan fortune was in decline. Despite having invested heavily in the property, the Morgan seat and main home remained Tredegar House, with Ruperra used as a weekend hunting lodge. The entire 3,000 acres (1,200 ha) estate was put up for sale, with the contents either moved to Tredegar House or sold in a three-day auction. Unstaffed and effectively abandoned, at the start of World War II, like many other large estate houses, it was taken over by the British Army, under whose control in 1941 it was destroyed by another fire. Post-war, it was left to deteriorate. In 1956, John Morgan, the sixth and final Baron Tredegar, sold the Castle along with its surrounding agricultural land to Eagle Star Insurance Company for around £800,000 (accounting for inflation) during his liquidation of the Morgan estates.

== Later ownership ==
Ashraf Barakat bought the castle in 1998 and tried to revive the sport of polo in Wales. After failing in a planning permission application to construct nine residential flats within the building, following the discovery of roosting Greater and Lesser horseshoe bats on the premises, he applied to demolish it to build housing; planning permission was refused. In September 2010, Barakat put the castle up for sale, at a price of £1.5m for 14 acres (with an optional further 16 acres), and it was sold in about July 2014. (Note: £1,500,000 in 2010 equates to approximately £2,317,000 in 2025, according to calculations based on the Consumer Price Index measure of inflation.) It remains privately owned and its condition continues to deteriorate. A charity, the Ruperra Castle Preservation Trust, has been established which is working towards the building's restoration. In 2022 Cadw designated the castle gardens and park Grade II on the Cadw/ICOMOS Register of Parks and Gardens of Special Historic Interest in Wales. In November 2023, inspectors found the building was structurally unsound and in imminent danger of collapse.

== See also ==
- List of castles in Wales
- Castles in Great Britain and Ireland
- Ruperra Motte

== Sources ==
- Clark, Gregory (2023). "The Annual RPI and Average Earnings for Britain, 1209 to Present (New Series)". MeasuringWorth. Archived from the original on 1 April 2023.
- Philip Jenkins. The Making of a Ruling Class: The Glamorgan Gentry 1640–1790. Cambridge University Press. ISBN 0-521-52194-7.
- Pat Moseley. Ruperra Castle War & Flames 1939–46. Tower Printing. ASIN B001CBUX7G.
- Pat Moseley, Christopher Jones-Jenkins. Serving Under Ruperra. Tower Printing. ISBN 0-9561464-1-4.
- RCAHMW, (1981), Glamorgan: The Greater Houses HMSO, pp262–8, pls and ills. ISBN 0117007544
