= Brecon by-election =

Brecon by-election or similar terms may refer to:

- 1854 Brecon by-election
- 1858 Breconshire by-election
- 1875 Breconshire by-election
- February 1866 Brecon by-election
- October 1866 Brecon by-election
- 1869 Brecon by-election
- 1870 Brecon by-election
- 1939 Brecon and Radnorshire by-election
- 1985 Brecon and Radnor by-election
- 2019 Brecon and Radnorshire by-election
