= Charles Morgan, 1st Baron Tredegar =

Welsh Whig peer and member of the House of Lords

The Right Honourable The Lord Tredegar
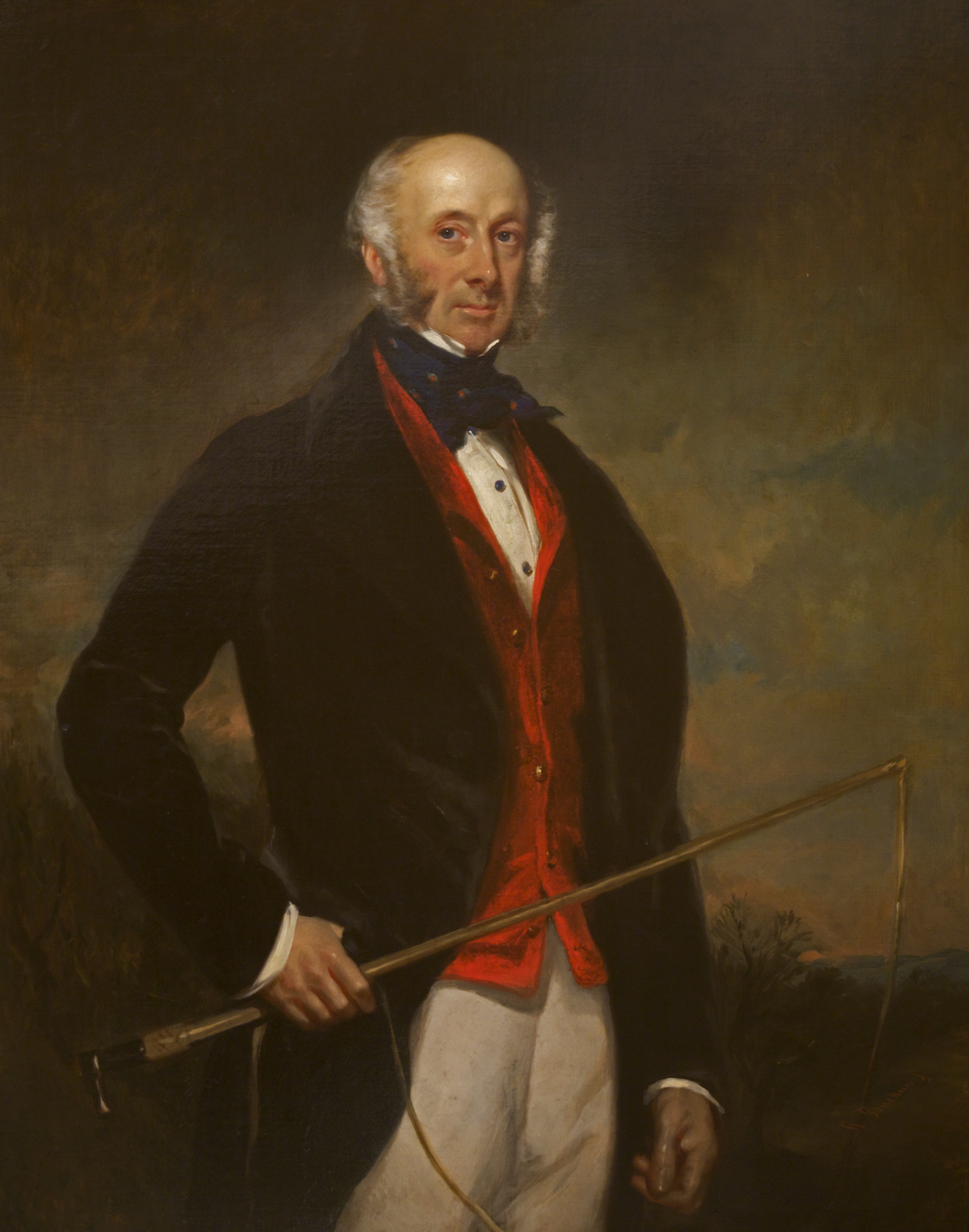
- Portrait of Lord Tredegar by Richard Buckner, c. 1850

Member of Parliament for Brecon
- In office 1835–1847
- Preceded by: John Lloyd Vaughan Watkins
- Succeeded by: John Lloyd Vaughan Watkins
- In office 1830–1832
- Preceded by: George Gould Morgan
- Succeeded by: John Lloyd Vaughan Watkins
- In office 1812–1818
- Preceded by: Sir Robert Salusbury
- Succeeded by: George Gould Morgan

Personal details
- Born: Charles Morgan Robinson Morgan; 10 April 1792
- Died: 16 April 1875 (aged 83)
- Party: Whig
- Spouse: Rosamund Mundy (m. 1827)
- Children: 11, including Charles, Godfrey, Frederick
- Parent(s): Sir Charles Morgan, 2nd Baronet; Mary Margaret Stoney
- Education: Harrow School; Westminster School
- Alma mater: Christ Church, Oxford

Charles Morgan Robinson Morgan, 1st Baron Tredegar (10 April 1792 – 16 April 1875), known as Sir Charles Morgan Robinson Morgan, 3rd Baronet from 1846 to 1859, was a Welsh Whig peer and a member of the House of Lords.

== Early life ==
Morgan was born on 10 April 1792. He was the eldest son of Lt.-Col. Sir Charles Morgan, 2nd Baronet, and his wife, the former Mary Margaret Stoney. Among his younger brothers were George Gould Morgan, MP for Brecon, Charles Augustus Samuel Morgan, and the antiquarian Charles Octavius Swinnerton Morgan. Among his sisters were Maria (wife of Francis Miles Milman), Charlotte (wife of George Rodney, 3rd Baron Rodney), and Angelina (wife of Sir Hugh Owen, 2nd Baronet).

His maternal grandfather was Capt. George Stoney of the Royal Navy. His paternal grandparents were Sir Charles Morgan, 1st Baronet (originally Charles Gould) and the former Jane Morgan (daughter of Judge Advocate Thomas Morgan). His great aunt Jane married the industrialist Samuel Homfray.

He was educated at Harrow School, Westminster School and Christ Church, Oxford (1811).

== Career ==
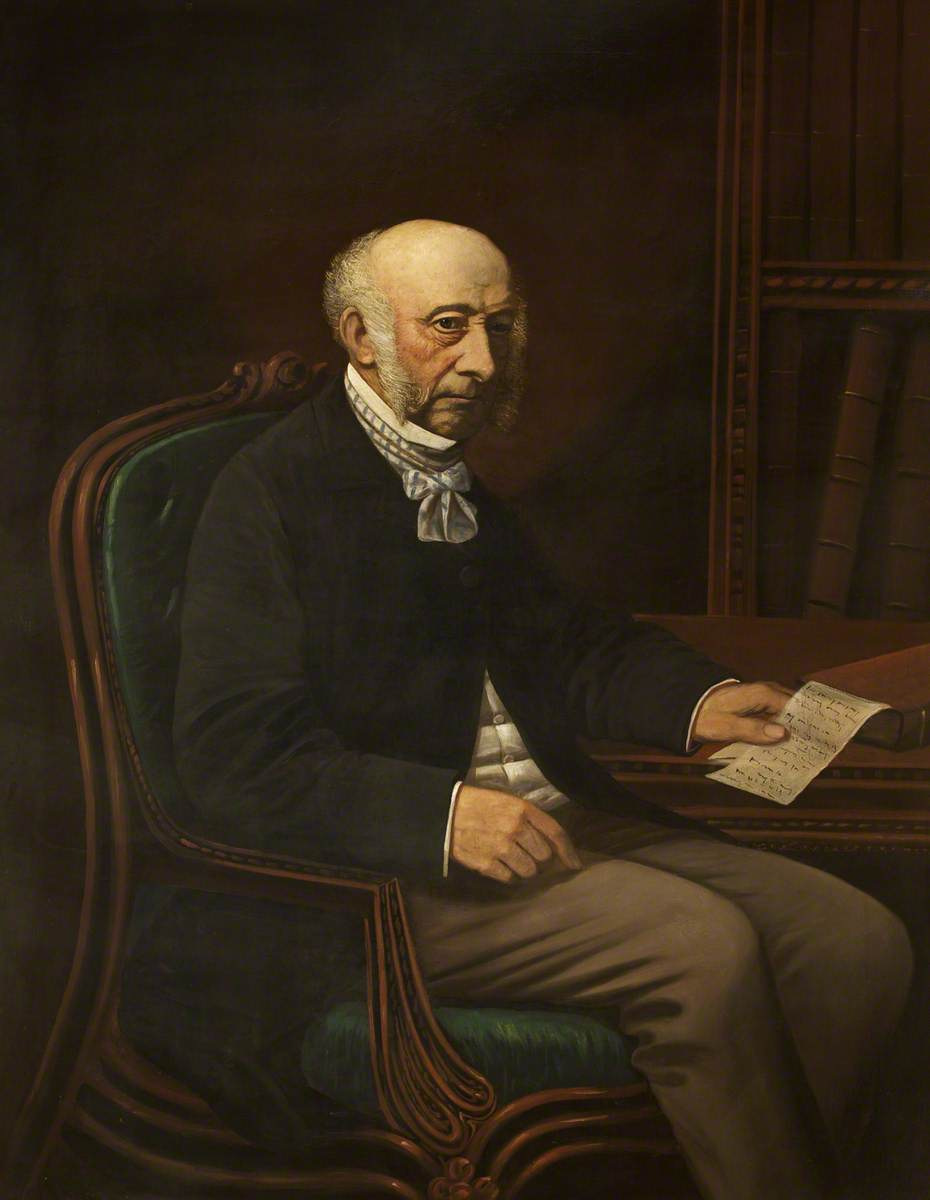
Portrait of Lord Tredegar, between 1840 and 1850

He was first elected Member of Parliament (MP) for Brecon in 1812 and was re-elected in 1830 and 1835. Upon his father's death in 1846, he succeeded the Morgan Baronetcy, created for his grandfather in 1792.

He served in the Glamorgan Yeomanry and later in the militia (the Royal Glamorgan Light Infantry, commissioned as Major on 3 April 1849), and was appointed High Sheriff of Monmouthshire for 1821–22 and High Sheriff of Brecknockshire for 1850–51. He was created Baron Tredegar, of Tredegar in the County of Monmouth on 16 April 1859 and was Lord Lieutenant of Brecknockshire from 1866 until his death.

He served as chairman of the Monmouthshire Railway and Canal Company, chairman of the Alexandra Dock Company. He also served as president of the Royal Agricultural Society and president of Equitable Life Assurance Society from 1846 until his death in 1875.

== Personal life ==
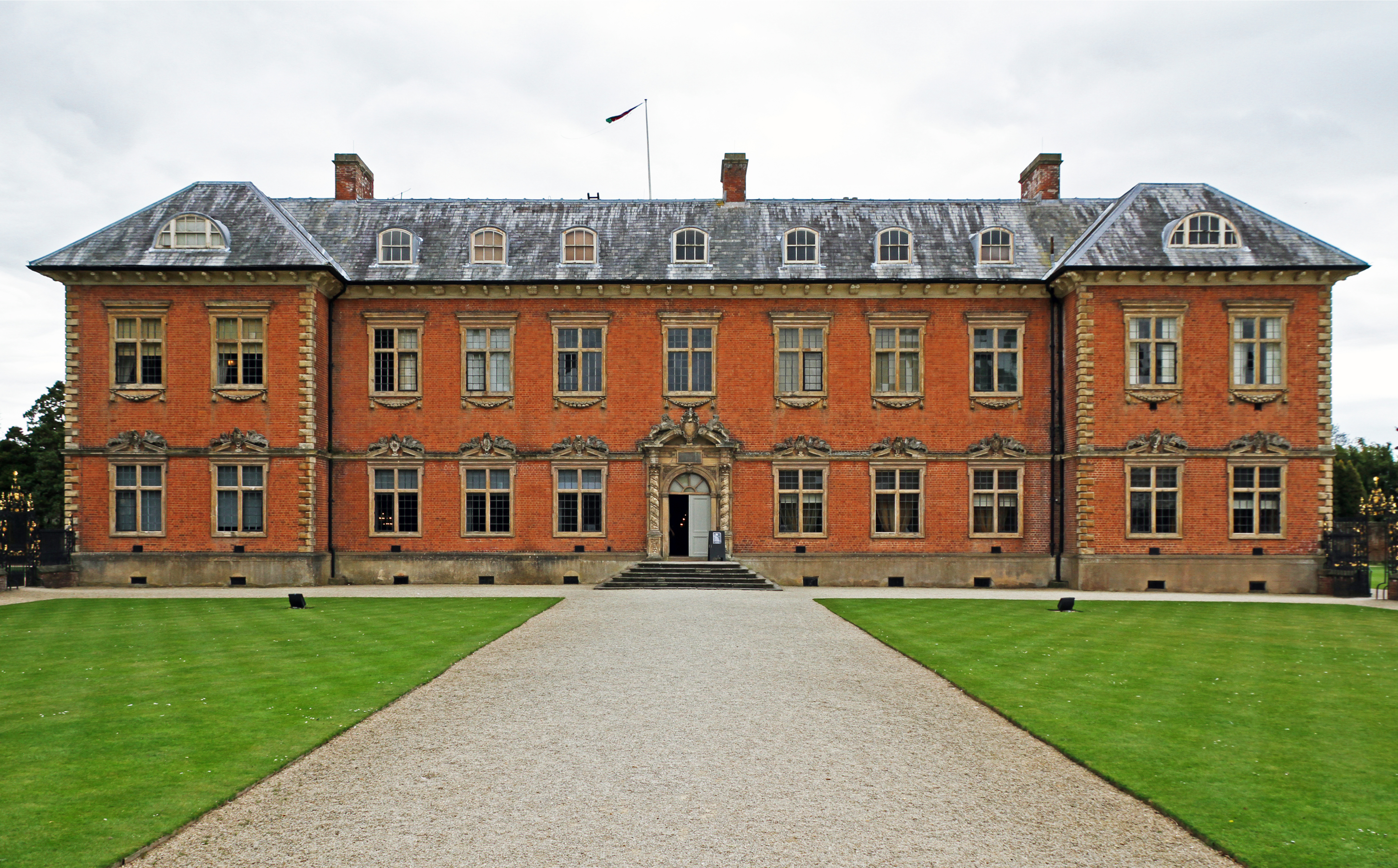
Tredegar House

In late 1827, Morgan married Rosamund Mundy, the daughter of Maj.-Gen. Godfrey Basil Meynell Mundy and Sarah Brydges Rodney. Together, they lived at Tredegar House, where he was a noted breeder of shorthorn cattle, and had five sons and six daughters, including:

- Charles Rodney Morgan (1828–1854), MP for Brecon.
- Hon. Rosamond Marion Morgan (1830–1883), who married Sir William Style, 9th Baronet, in 1848.
- Godfrey Charles Morgan, 1st Viscount Tredegar (1830–1913), an MP for Breconshire who never married.
- Hon. Selina Maria Morgan (d. 1922), who married David Robertson Williamson, nephew of David Williamson, Lord Balgray, in 1853.
- Hon. Frederick Courtenay Morgan (1834–1909), MP for Monmouthshire and South Monmouthshire who married Charlotte Anne Williamson, daughter of Charles Alexander Williamson of Lawers.
- Hon. Frances Henrietta Morgan (c. 1835–1887), who married Sir George Forestier-Walker, 2nd Baronet, son of Sir George Walker, 1st Baronet, in 1854.
- Hon. Ellen Sarah Morgan (c. 1836–1916), who married Lt.-Col. Henry Gore Lindsay, chief constable of Glamorgan, in 1856.
- Hon. Georgiana Charlotte Morgan (c. 1839–1886), who married Lord Francis Conyngham, a son of Francis Conyngham, 2nd Marquess Conyngham, in 1857. After his death she married Lt.-Col. Alan George Chichester (a grandson of the 1st Baron Templemore), in 1882.
- Hon. Arthur John Morgan (1840–1900), who died unmarried.
- Hon. George Gould Morgan (1845–1907), who died unmarried.
- Hon. Mary Anna Morgan (d. 1924), who married Robert Devereux, 16th Viscount Hereford, in 1863.

Lord Tredegar died on 16 April 1875 and was succeeded by his second son Godfrey as his eldest son, Charles, predeceased him unmarried and without legitimate male issue.

=== Descendants ===
Through his daughter Ellen, he was a grandfather of Lt.-Col. Morgan Lindsay, Maj.-Gen. George Mackintosh Lindsay, Lionel Arthur Lindsay, who was also chief constable of Glamorgan.

Through his son Frederic, Morgan was a grandfather of Courtenay and Frederic Morgan, later the 3rd and 5th Barons Tredegar respectively, and great-grandfather of Evan and John Morgan, the 4th and 6th respective Barons Tredegar.

Parliament of the United Kingdom
Preceded by Sir Robert Salusbury	Member of Parliament for Brecon; 1812–1818	Succeeded by George Gould Morgan
Preceded by George Gould Morgan	Member of Parliament for Brecon; 1830–1832	Succeeded by John Lloyd Vaughan Watkins
Preceded by John Lloyd Vaughan Watkins	Member of Parliament for Brecon; 1835–1847	Succeeded by John Lloyd Vaughan Watkins
Honorary titles
Preceded by William Pearce	High Sheriff of Brecknockshire; 1850	Succeeded by Robert Raikes
Preceded by The Marquess Camden	Lord Lieutenant of Brecknockshire; 1866–1875	Succeeded by Sir Joseph Bailey
Peerage of the United Kingdom
New creation	Baron Tredegar; 1859–1875	Succeeded by Godfrey Morgan
Baronetage of Great Britain
Preceded by Charles Gould Morgan	Baronet (of Tredegar); 1846–1875	Succeeded by Godfrey Morgan
