= Sir Charles Morgan, 2nd Baronet =

Welsh soldier and politician

Lt. Col. Sir Charles Gould Morgan 2nd Baronet
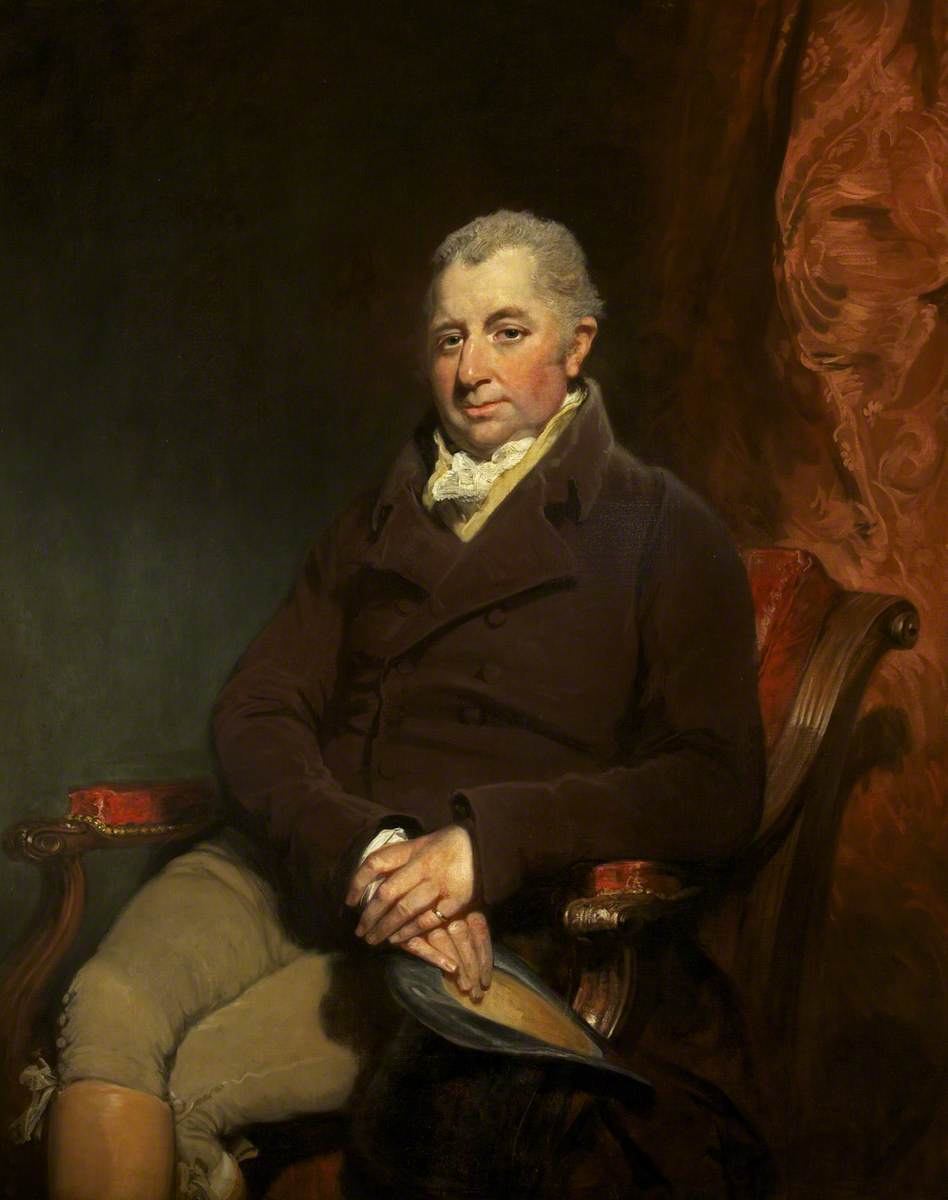

Member of Parliament for Monmouthshire
- In office 1796–1831
- Preceded by: Robert Salusbury
- Succeeded by: William Addams Williams

Member of Parliament for Brecon
- In office 1787–1796
- Preceded by: Charles Van
- Succeeded by: Robert Salusbury

Personal details
- Born: 4 February 1760
- Died: 5 December 1846 (aged 86)
- Spouse: Mary Margaret (or Mary Magdalen) Stoney (m. 1791)
- Children: 8, including Charles Morgan, 1st Baron Tredegar
- Parent: Sir Charles Morgan, 1st Baronet (father)

Lieutenant-Colonel Sir Charles Gould Morgan, 2nd Baronet (4 February 1760 – 5 December 1846), was a Welsh soldier and politician, the MP for Brecon and County of Monmouth.

== Early career ==
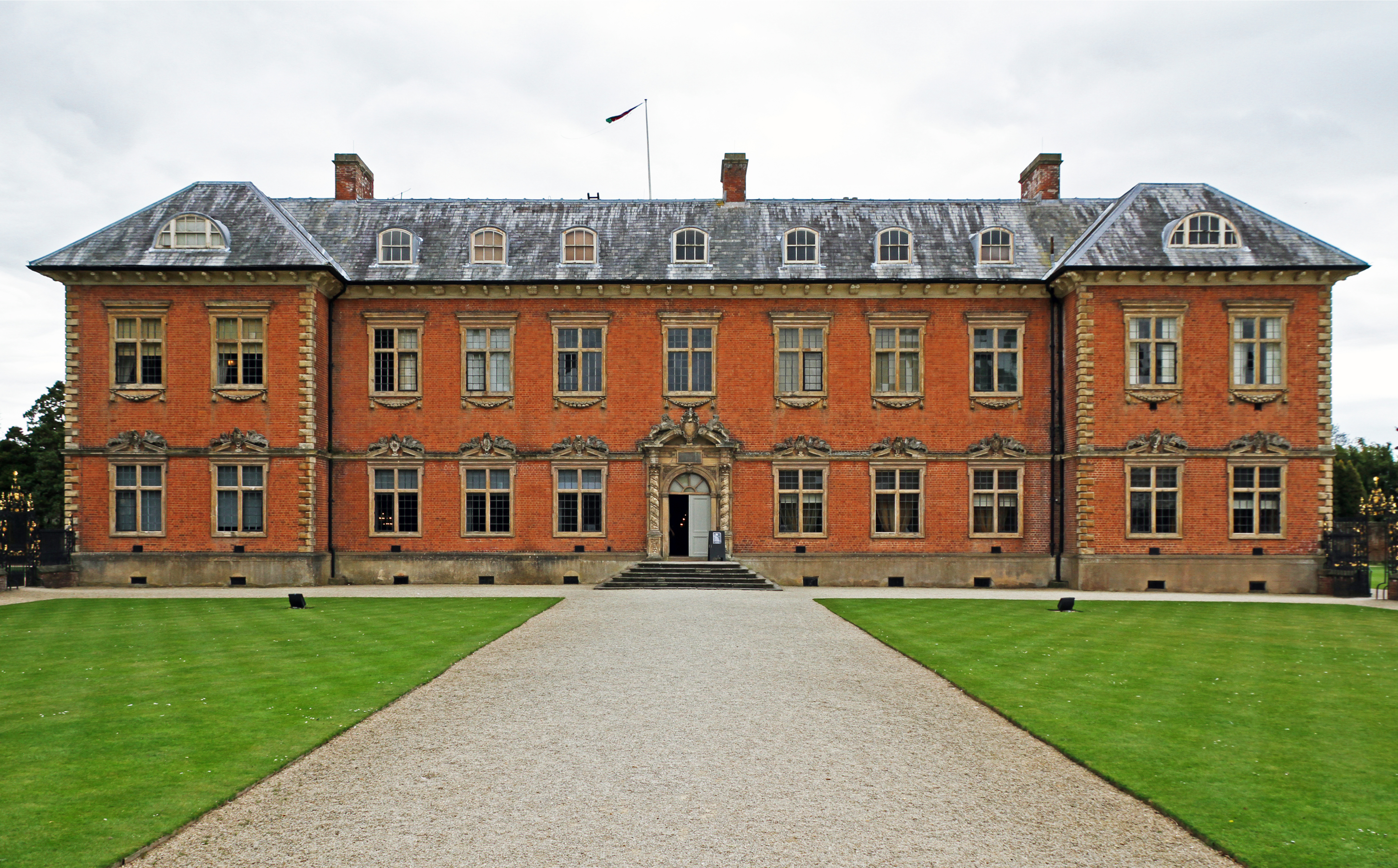
Tredegar House

The 2nd baronet was the son of Sir Charles Morgan, 1st Baronet (originally Charles Gould), and Jane Morgan (daughter of Thomas Morgan. His sister Jane married the industrialist Samuel Homfray.

He was commissioned ensign and lieutenant in the Coldstream Guards on 21 November 1777, and promoted to lieutenant and captain on 22 March 1781. He was taken prisoner in the capitulation at Yorktown on 19 October. He was promoted captain and lieutenant-colonel on 14 May 1790, retiring from the Army on 4 December 1792.

He became an MP for Brecon (1787–1796) and later for the County of Monmouth (1796–1831), supporting the government of Lord Liverpool. He adopted the name of Morgan in 1792, at the same time as his father, and inherited the Tredegar estate of his uncle John Morgan from his mother in 1797.

== Landowner and industrialist ==
In 1806, he succeeded to the baronetcy. He also succeeded his father as a Bailiff on the board of the Bedford Level Corporation from 1807 to 1827, and was Recorder for Newport from 1807 to 1835. He was considered a good landlord, and held annual cattle shows on his Tredegar Park estate.

His political opponent, John Frost, referred to him as "a handsome little man ... possessed of great power". By 1820, he had amassed an income of about £40,000 a year from his estates and investments.

He was elected a Fellow of the Royal Society in 1816, in recognition of his investment in agricultural improvements.

== Family ==
Morgan (then still Gould) married Mary Margaret (or Mary Magdalen) Stoney, daughter of Capt. George Stoney R.N., in 1791, and they had eight children, four sons and four daughters. He did not remarry after her death in 1807.

Morgan was succeeded by his eldest son, Charles Morgan, 1st Baron Tredegar. His other children were:

- George Gould Morgan (1794–1845), army officer and Member of Parliament
- Charles Augustus Samuel Morgan (1800–1875), clergyman, who married his first cousin Frances Lascelles, daughter of Rowley Lascelles
- Charles Octavius Swinnerton Morgan (1803–1888), antiquarian.

The daughters were:

- Maria Margaret (died 1875), who married in 1817 Francis Miles Milman, an army officer and son of Sir Francis Milman, 1st Baronet, and had children
- Charlotte Georgiana (died 1878), who married in 1819 George Rodney, 3rd Baron Rodney, and had no children
- Angelina Maria Cecilia (died 1844), who married in 1825 Sir Hugh Owen Owen, 2nd Baronet, and had children
- Selina Anne, who died young

== Death ==
Sir Charles died, aged 86, at Tredegar House. The mourners at his funeral included Sir Benjamin Hall, Charles Kemeys Kemeys Tynte, and Sir George Tyler, 1st Baronet, and he was buried in the family vault at St Basil's Church, Bassaleg.

Parliament of the United Kingdom
Preceded by Charles Van	Member of Parliament for Brecon; 1787–1796	Succeeded by Robert Salusbury
Preceded by James Rooke; Robert Salusbury	Member of Parliament for Monmouthshire; 1796 – 1800; With: James Rooke	Succeeded by Parliament of Great Britain
Parliament of the United Kingdom
Preceded by Parliament of the United Kingdom	Member of Parliament for Monmouthshire; 1801–1831; With: James Rooke to 1805; Lord Arthur Somerset 1805–1816; Lord Granville Somerset from 1816	Succeeded by Lord Granville Somerset; William Addams Williams
Baronetage of Great Britain
Preceded by Charles Morgan	Baronet (of Tredegar); 1800–1846	Succeeded by Charles Morgan
