= Sir Henry Williams, 2nd Baronet =

Welsh politician

Sir Henry Williams, 2nd Baronet (c. 1635 – February 1666) was a Welsh politician who sat in the House of Commons from 1660 to 1661.

He was one of the Williams baronets. He was a Member of Parliament and represented the constituencies of Brecon and Breconshire (c. Apr 1661 – election declared void 25 July 1661).

His daughter Elizabeth married Sir Edward Williams.

Parliament of England
Preceded by Samuel Wightwick	Member of Parliament for Brecon; 1660–1661	Succeeded by Sir Herbert Price
Preceded by Sir William Lewis	Member of Parliament for Breconshire; 1661	Succeeded by John Jeffreys
Baronetage of England
Preceded by Henry Williams	Baronet (of Old Gwernyfed) c.1652–1666	Succeeded by Walter Williams
