= 1875 Breconshire by-election =

UK Parliamentary by-election

The 1875 Breconshire by-election was fought on 20 May 1875. The by-election was fought due to the succession to a peerage of the incumbent Conservative MP, Godfrey Morgan. It was won by the Liberal candidate William Fuller-Maitland.

1875 Breconshire by-election
Party	Candidate	Votes	%	±%
Liberal	William Fuller-Maitland	1,710	51.6	+12.2
Conservative	Howel Gwyn	1,603	48.4	−12.2
Majority		107	3.2	N/A
Turnout		3,313	77.8	+4.3
Registered electors		4,256		
Liberal gain from Conservative		Swing	+12.2	
