= George Gould Morgan =

British military officer and politician (1794–1845)

Captain George Gould Morgan
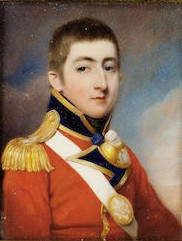
- Portrait c.1813 of Morgan in the uniform of the Coldstream Guards

Member of Parliament for Brecon
- In office 4 August 1818 – 24 July 1830
- Preceded by: Charles Morgan
- Succeeded by: Charles Morgan

Personal details
- Born: 12 July 1794
- Died: 25 August 1845 (aged 51) Brickendonbury Estate, Hertford, England
- Party: Tory
- Spouse: Eliza Beville (m. 1824)
- Children: 3
- Parent(s): Sir Charles Morgan, 2nd Baronet; Mary Margaret Stoney

Captain George Gould Morgan (12 July 1794 – 25 August 1845) was a Welsh politician and army officer who served as the Member of Parliament (MP) for Brecon from 1818 to 1830.

== Early life and family ==
George Gould Morgan was born on 12 July 1794. He was the second son of Lt.-Col. Sir Charles Morgan, 2nd Baronet, and Mary Margaret Stoney. His siblings included Charles Morgan, 1st Baron Tredegar, Charles Augustus Samuel Morgan, Charles Octavius Swinnerton Morgan, Maria (the wife of Francis Miles Milman), Charlotte (the wife of George Rodney, 3rd Baron Rodney), and Angelina (the wife of Sir Hugh Owen, 2nd Baronet).

His paternal grandfather was Sir Charles Morgan, 1st Baronet and his maternal grandfather was Capt. George Stoney of the Royal Navy.

== Career ==
Morgan was commissioned ensign and lieutenant in the Coldstream Guards on 4 July 1811 and promoted to lieutenant and captain on 26 October 1815. He was placed on Half-pay on 25 February 1819.

Morgan was brought in for the constituency of Brecon by his father in 1818, after his brother unsuccessfully stood for Breconshire. He stood down at the 1830 general election to make way for his brother to return to the seat. From 1842 to 1843, he was the High Sheriff of Hertfordshire.

== Personal life ==
On 7 July 1824, Morgan married Eliza Anne Beville, the daughter of Reverend William Beville, and they had three daughters including:

- Eliza Angeline Morgan (d. 1867), who married General George Willis on 11 December 1856.
- Selina Rose Catherine Morgan (d. 1896), who married Reverend W. N. Tilson Marsh-Lucherton-Tilson on 10 April 1858.

== Death ==
Morgan died intestate at Brickendonbury Estate, at the age of 51.

== See also ==
- List of MPs elected in the 1818 United Kingdom general election
