= Herbert Price =

Welsh politician

Sir Herbert Price, 1st Baronet (1605 – 14 January 1678) was a Welsh politician who sat in the House of Commons at various times between 1640 and 1678. He fought on the Royalist side in the English Civil War.

Price was the second son of Thomas Price of The Priory, Brecon and his wife Anne Rudhall and was educated in law at the Middle Temple (1622).

In April 1640, Price was elected member of parliament for Brecon in the Short Parliament and re-elected for the Long Parliament the following November. As an ardent Royalist he was disabled from sitting in Parliament on 8 May 1643. He fought as a Colonel at the Battle of Naseby and accompanied King Charles I in his retreat through Glamorgan and Brecon, entertaining him at the Priory on 6 August 1645. He may have been honoured by the King, but no records survive. He was governor of Brecon Castle and held Hereford until it was captured on 18 December 1645 and he was taken prisoner. His estates were sequestered on 13 May 1651 and his name was excepted out of the general pardon for South Wales. He went into exile, returning, having been created a baronet, in 1658.

In 1661 Price stood for Parliament again in disputed elections for both Brecon and Breconshire, but was allowed to sit for Brecon in what is known as the Cavalier Parliament, holding the seat until his death. He became Master of the Household for King Charles II in 1661 and a justice of the peace for Breconshire in 1666.

He died at the age of 73 and was buried in Westminster Abbey. He had married Goditha Arden, daughter of Sir Henry Arden of Park Hall Warwickshire and Dorothy Feilding and was succeeded by their eldest son Thomas Arden Price, 2nd Baronet. There were no grandsons and the title became extinct on Thomas' death in 1689. Their daughter, the younger Goditha, was the mistress of the future King James II in the 1660s. According to Samuel Pepys, the affair was conducted with great discretion: a later mistress of James, Lady Denham, said scornfully that she would not "go up and down the back stairs like Mistress Price". The Priory passed to Herbert's cousin Colonel John Jeffreys of Abercynrig, whose mother was a Price.

Parliament of England
Vacant Parliament suspended since 1629	Member of Parliament for Brecon; 1640–1643	Succeeded by Ludovic Lewis
Preceded by Sir Henry Williams, Bt	Member of Parliament for Brecon; 1661–1678	Succeeded by Thomas Mansel
Court offices
Vacant in abeyance	Master of the Household; 1661–1665, 1666–1678	Succeeded by Hon. Henry Bulkeley
Baronetage of England
New creation	Baronet (of the Priory); 1657–1678	Succeeded by Thomas Arden Price
