= Charles Rodney Morgan =

British politician

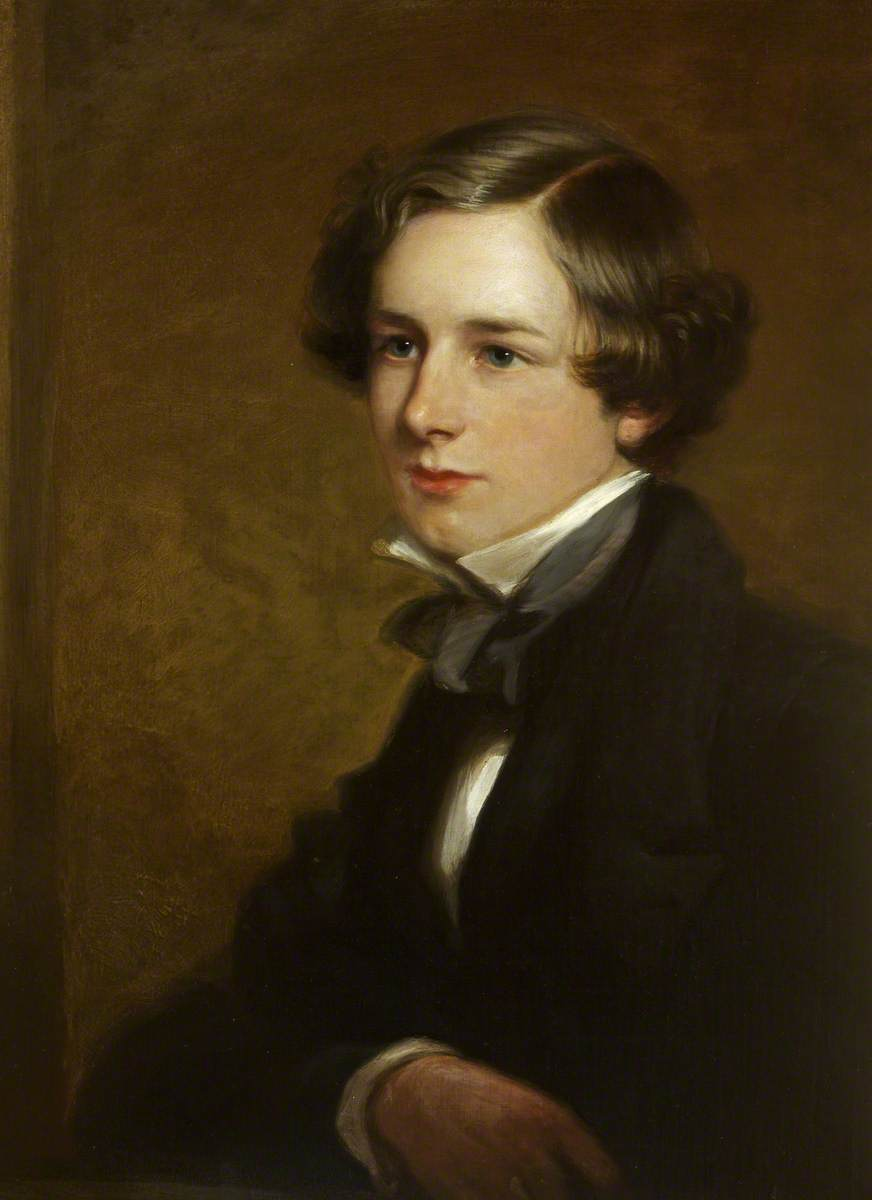

Member of Parliament for Brecon
- In office 1852–1854
- Preceded by: John Lloyd Vaughan Watkins
- Succeeded by: John Lloyd Vaughan Watkins

Personal details
- Born: 2 December 1828
- Died: 14 January 1854 (aged 25) Marseille, France
- Children: Charles Marie Émile Morgan
- Parent: Charles Morgan, 1st Baron Tredegar (father)

Charles Rodney Morgan (2 December 1828 – 14 January 1854) was a Welsh politician. He was the Conservative Member of Parliament for Brecon from 1852 until his death in 1854.

== Early life ==
Morgan was born on 2 December 1828. He was the eldest son of Charles Morgan, 1st Baron Tredegar and Rosamond Mundy (the daughter of Maj.-Gen. Godfrey Basil Meynell Mundy). Among his siblings were Godfrey Morgan, 1st Viscount Tredegar, an MP for Breconshire, and Frederic Courtenay Morgan, MP for Monmouthshire and South Monmouthshire.

== Career ==
Morgan was the Conservative Member of Parliament for Brecon, the seat held by successive generations of his family, from 1852 until his death in 1854, in Marseille

== Personal life ==
Morgan had a relationship with Émilie Renaud. Together, they were the parents of Charles Marie Émile Morgan.

Morgan died on 14 January 1854, before he could accede to his father's titles.

=== Descendants ===
His granddaughter Berthe Loïse Juliette Morgan was married to French Vice Admiral François Darlan.

Parliament of the United Kingdom
Preceded by John Lloyd Vaughan Watkins	Member of Parliament for Brecon; 1852–1854	Succeeded by John Lloyd Vaughan Watkins
