= Roger Jones (MP) =

Welsh politician

Roger Jones (c. 1691–1741) was a Welsh politician who sat in the House of Commons from 1713 to 1722.

Jones was the only surviving son of Edward Jones, M.P., of Buckland, Breconshire. He matriculated at Balliol College, Oxford on 16 May 1707 aged 15 and was also admitted at the Inner Temple in 1707.

Jones was returned as Member of Parliament for the Welsh borough of Brecon at the 1713 general election. He was returned again unopposed at the 1715 general election. In 1722 he resigned his seat at Brecon, and stood unsuccessfully for Breconshire.

He was one of the original backers of the Royal Academy of Music, establishing a London opera company which commissioned numerous works from Handel, Bononcini and others.

Jones married firstly Dorothy Cornish, the daughter of Henry Cornish, a London merchant in about 1714. She died in 1735 and he married, as his second wife, Eleanor. He died without issue from either marriage in 1741.

Parliament of Great Britain
Preceded by Edward Jeffreys	Member of Parliament for Brecon; 1713–1722	Succeeded by William Morgan
