= James Rooke (British Army general) =

English general

General James Rooke
- Born: c.28 November 1742; Gloucestershire
- Died: 4 October 1805 (aged 62); Trellech Hills, Monmouthshire
- Burial place: St Briavels, Gloucestershire
- Spouse: Elizabeth Brown (m. 1777)
- Military career
- Allegiance: United Kingdom
- Branch: British Army
- Service years: 1759–1805
- Rank: General
- Commands: Commandant of Gorée
- Conflicts: American Revolutionary War

Member of Parliament for Monmouthshire
- In office 1785–1805

General James Rooke (c. 28 November 1742 – 4 October 1805) was an English general in the British Army and a politician.

== Early life ==
He was the only son of Major James Rooke and his wife, Jane, daughter and heiress of Tracy Catchmay of Bigsweir House, Monmouthshire. He inherited large estates in Monmouthshire from his mother.

== Career ==
Rooke joined the army in 1759, and by 1779 was a Lieutenant-Colonel of the 14th Foot. He was promoted colonel in 1780, major-general in 1787 and served as colonel commandant of the 4th Battalion, 60th (Royal American) Regiment of Foot from 1788 to 1796.

In 1796 he was given the colonelcy of the 38th (1st Staffordshire) Regiment of Foot for life and promoted to full General in 1802.

He was a Member of Parliament (MP) for Monmouthshire from 1785 until his death.

== Personal life and death ==
Rooke married Elizabeth Brown of St Briavels on 3 September 1776.

Rooke died at age 63 and was buried in St Briavels, Gloucestershire in 1805.

Parliament of Great Britain
Preceded by John Morgan; Viscount Nevill	Member of Parliament for Monmouthshire; 1785 – 1800; With: John Morgan to 1792; Robert Salusbury 1792–96; Charles Gould Morgan from 1796	Succeeded by Parliament of the United Kingdom
Parliament of the United Kingdom
Preceded by Parliament of Great Britain	Member of Parliament for Monmouthshire; 1801 – 1805; With: Charles Gould Morgan	Succeeded by Charles Gould Morgan; Lord Arthur Somerset
Military offices
Preceded by Sir Robert Pigot, 2nd Baronet	Colonel of the 38th (1st Staffordshire) Regiment of Foot; 1796–1805	Succeeded by George Ludlow, 3rd Earl Ludlow
