= Charles Vaughan (of Porthamal) =

Welsh landowner and politician

Sir Charles Vaughan (1584-1630) was a Welsh landowner and politician who sat in the House of Commons in 1614 and 1625.

Vaughan was the eldest son of Sir Walter Vaughan of Dunraven, Glamorgan, Pembrey, Carmarthenshire, and Tealstone, Wiltshire (died 1639) and Anne Hannam. He was educated at The Queen's College, Oxford. Vaughan was knighted on 7 November 1608, soon after his marriage. He had a family tree or pedigree drawn up, which described his descent form the Vaughan family of Bredwardine, Herefordshire.

In 1614, Vaughan was elected Member of Parliament for Breconshire. He was elected MP for Breconshire again in 1625.

Charles Vaughan is sometimes confused with another Member of Parliament and sheriff of Brecknock, Charles Vaughan of Tretower (died 1637).

Vaughan was the owner of Faulston or Falston manor, at Bishopstone. Arbella Stuart stayed at Faulston in 1603, while the royal court was nearby at Wilton House.

Vaughan married firstly Frances Knollys daughter of Sir Robert Knollys and through her acquired the estate of Porthamel (or Porthamal) Breconshire. She died in 1614 aged 24. He married secondly Dorothy Miller (Mellor or Meller) daughter of Sir Robert Miller of Littlebredy, Dorset. His only daughter Bridget married John Ashburnham, 1st Baron Ashburnham and brought him the Porthamal estate.

He was buried at Bristol Cathedral, where there is a monument erected by his widow. She later married Sir Robert Gorges of Wraxall.

Parliament of England
Preceded by Sir Robert Knollys	Member of Parliament for Breconshire; 1614	Succeeded by Sir Henry Williams
Preceded by Sir Henry Williams	Member of Parliament for Breconshire; 1625	Succeeded by John Price
