= Charles Van =

British Member of Parliament (died 1778)

Charles Van (died 1778) was a British politician who sat in the House of Commons from 1772 to 1778.

Van was the eldest son of Charles Van, of Llanwern, and his second wife Elizabeth Samson of Henbury, near Bristol. He married Catherine Morgan, daughter of Thomas Morgan in September 1754. Her father and three brothers were all MPs. He succeeded his father on 6 January 1755. In 1760 he built a new house at Llanwern Park.

Following his marriage into the Morgan family, Van stood for Parliament at Glamorgan in a by-election in 1756, but was heavily defeated. He stood for Monmouthshire at a by-election in 1765, but when the Morgan family gave their interest to his opponent, he withdrew. He was eventually returned unopposed as Member of Parliament for Brecon at a by-election on 31 January 1772. He was also returned unopposed in 1774. He was strongly against the American colonists and was apparently an amusing speaker in Parliament.

Van died on 3 April 1778. His daughter Catherine married Sir Robert Salusbury, 1st Baronet and inherited his estate.

Parliament of Great Britain
Preceded by John Morgan	Member of Parliament for Brecon; 1772–1778	Succeeded by Sir Charles Gould
