= Brecon (UK Parliament constituency) =

UK Parliament constituency (1542–1885)

- Former borough constituency for the House of Commons

1542–1885
- Seats: one
- Replaced by: Breconshire

Brecon was a parliamentary constituency in Wales which returned one Member of Parliament (MP) to the House of Commons of the Parliament of the United Kingdom and its predecessors, from 1542 until it was abolished for the 1885 general election.

== Boundaries ==
From its first election in 1542 until some time before 1715, the constituency consisted of a number of boroughs within the historic county of Brecknockshire or Breconshire in Wales. From then until 1885 the seat represented the parliamentary borough of Brecon alone. The constituency should not be confused with the county constituency of Breconshire, which existed from the sixteenth century until 1918.

On the basis of information from several volumes of the History of Parliament, it is apparent that the history of the borough representation from Wales and Monmouthshire is more complicated than that of the English boroughs.

The Laws in Wales Act 1535 (26 Hen. 8. c. 26) provided for a single borough seat for each of 11 of the 12 Welsh counties and Monmouthshire. The legislation was ambiguous as to which communities were enfranchised. The county towns were awarded a seat, but this in some fashion represented all the ancient boroughs of the county as the others were required to contribute to the member's wages. It was not clear if the burgesses of the contributing boroughs could take part in the election. The only election under the original scheme was for the 1542 parliament. It seems that only burgesses from the county towns actually took part. The Parliament Act 1543 (35 Hen. 8. c. 11) confirmed that the contributing boroughs could send representatives to take part in the election at the county town. As far as can be told from surviving indentures of returns, the degree to which the out boroughs participated varied, but by the end of the sixteenth century all the seats had some participation from them at some elections at least.

The original scheme was modified by later legislation and decisions of the House of Commons (which were sometimes made with no regard to precedent or evidence: for example in 1728 it was decided that only the freemen of the borough of Montgomery could participate in the election for that seat, thus disenfranchising the freemen of Llanidloes, Welshpool and Llanfyllin).

In the case of Breconshire, the county town and principal borough was Brecon. One ward of the principal borough was an exclave; namely Trecastle, in the township of Llywel eleven miles west of the main town. There is no evidence that any other boroughs in Breconshire actually took part in elections before 1597. The out boroughs then participating were Builth (now known as Builth Wells), Crickhowel or Crickhowell, Hay (now Hay-on-Wye) and Telgarth or Talgarth.

At some point between 1603 and 1715 the out boroughs ceased to participate in elections for the constituency. Until 1727 all the freemen of Brecon formed the electorate, but in 1727 the House of Commons ruled that only the resident freemen could vote. There had been about 180 electors in 1723 and 1727, but only 69 in 1744 after the basis of the franchise had been changed. There were about 100 voters between 1754 and 1790.

== Later history ==
When registration of electors and an additional householder franchise were introduced in 1832, the constituency, still based on the town of Brecon, had the smallest electorate in Wales with just 242 registered voters.

Brecon was little affected by the upsurge of radical politics in the 1860s apart from the one occasion in 1866 when Thomas Price, the prominent nonconformist minister, intervened in a by-election contest to compel the Liberal candidate, the Earl of Brecknock, to issue an address more strongly in favour of reform.

Even after the extension of the franchise in 1868, the number of voters only increased to 814. This did, however, result in one of the most tumultuous elections in the history of the borough, which included a torchlight procession and lively meetings at which speakers struggled to make themselves heard. On election day it was generally accepted that supporters of the Conservative candidate, Howel Gwyn, had been caught engaged in bribery. His unseating by petition in April 1869 indicated how Brecon largely remained a closed borough, dominated by the politics of influence.

After 1885 Breconshire was represented in Parliament by the single member county constituency, which included all the boroughs formerly in the Brecon constituency.

== Members of Parliament ==
MPs 1542-1640 — MPs 1640-1660 — MPs 1660-1885 — Elections — References

=== MPs 1542–1640 ===
As there were sometimes significant gaps between Parliaments held in this period, the dates of first assembly and dissolution are given. Where the name of the member has not yet been ascertained or (before 1558) is not recorded in a surviving document, the entry unknown is entered in the table.

The Roman numerals after some names are those used in The House of Commons 1509–1558 to distinguish a member from another politician of the same name.

Elected	Assembled	Dissolved	Member	Note
1542	16 January 1542	28 March 1544	Edward Games	
1545	23 November 1545	31 January 1547	Edward Games	
1547	4 November 1547	15 April 1552	Edward Games	
1553	1 March 1553	31 March 1553	Edward Games	
1553	5 October 1553	5 December 1553	Edward Games	
1554	2 April 1554	3 May 1554	Edward Games	
1554	12 November 1554	16 January 1555	Meredith Games	
1555	21 October 1555	9 December 1555	unknown	
1558	20 January 1558	17 November 1558	William Aubrey	
1559	23 January 1559	8 May 1559	Roland Vaughan	
1562–63	11 January 1563	2 January 1567	Sir Roger Vaughan	
1571	2 April 1571	29 May 1571	Richard Price	
1572	8 May 1572	19 April 1583	Walter Games	
1584	23 November 1584	14 September 1585	David Williams	
1586	13 October 1586	23 March 1587	David Williams	
1588	4 February 1589	29 March 1589	David Williams	
1593	18 February 1593	10 April 1593	Sir Matthew Morgan	
1597	24 October 1597	9 February 1598	David Williams	
1601	27 October 1601	19 December 1601	Henry Williams	
1604	19 March 1604	9 February 1611	Sir Henry Williams	
1614	5 April 1614	7 June 1614	Sir John Crompton	
1620	16 January 1621	8 February 1622	Sir Walter Pye	
12 January 1624	12 February 1624	27 March 1625	Sir Walter Pye	
4 March 1625	17 May 1625	12 August 1625	Sir Walter Pye	
12 January 1626	6 February 1626	15 June 1626	Sir Walter Pye	Elected to sit for Herefordshire
February 1626	6 February 1626	15 June 1626	Sir Humphrey Lynde	
31 March 1628	17 March 1628	10 March 1629	Walter Pye (Royalist)	
1640	13 April 1640	5 May 1640	Herbert Price	

Back to Members of Parliament

=== MPs 1640–1660 ===
This sub-section includes the Long Parliament and the Rump Parliament, together with the Parliaments of the Commonwealth and the Protectorate (before the Convention Parliament of 1660).

Elected	Assembled	Dissolved	Member	Note
1640	3 November 1640		Herbert Price	Long Parliament
...	1647	20 April 1653	Ludovic Lewis	Rump Parliament
...	4 July 1653	12 December 1653	unrepresented	Barebones Parliament
1654	3 September 1654	22 January 1655	unrepresented	First Protectorate Parliament
1656	17 September 1656	4 February 1658	unrepresented	Second Protectorate Parliament
1658–59	27 January 1659	22 April 1659	Samuel Wightwick	Third Protectorate Parliament
...	7 May 1659	20 February 1660	unknown	Rump Parliament restored
...	21 February 1660	16 March 1660	unknown	Long Parliament restored

Back to Members of Parliament

=== MPs 1660–1885 ===
First Election	Member	Party	Note
1660, c. April	Sir Henry Williams, Bt		
1661, 26 April	Sir Herbert Price		
1678, 14 February	Thomas Mansel		
1679, 28 February	John Jeffreys		
1689, 10 January	Thomas Morgan (of Dderw)	Whig	(1664–1700)
1690, 6 March	Jeffrey Jeffreys		
1698, 25 July	Thomas Morgan (of Dderw)	Whig	(1664–1700) Also returned for Monmouthshire
1701, 17 January	Sir Jeffrey Jeffreys		
1709, 28 November	Edward Jeffreys		
1713, 11 September	Roger Jones		
1722, 29 March	William Morgan		(1701–1731) Elected to sit for Monmouthshire
1723, 24 May	Thomas Morgan		(1702–1769)
1734, 1 May	Hon. John Talbot		
1754, 15 April	Thomas Morgan (of Rhiwpera)		(1727–1771) Resigned to contest Monmouthshire
1763, 5 December	Charles Morgan		(1736–1787) Resigned to contest Breconshire
1769, 15 May	John Morgan		(1742–1792) Resigned to contest Monmouthshire
1772, 31 January	Charles Van		Died 3 April 1778
1778, 23 April	Sir Charles Gould		(1726–1806) Resigned to contest Breconshire
1787, 6 December	Sir Charles Morgan		(1760–1846) Elected to sit for Monmouthshire
1796, 2 November	Sir Robert Salusbury, Bt	Tory	
1812, 9 October	Charles Morgan	Whig	(1792–1875)
1818, 20 June	George Gould Morgan	Tory	(1794–1845)
1830, 3 August	Charles Morgan	Whig	(1792–1875)
1832, 12 December	John Lloyd Vaughan Watkins	Whig	
1835, 6 January	Charles Morgan	Conservative	(1792–1875)
1847, 3 August	John Lloyd Vaughan Watkins	Whig	
1852, 9 July	Charles Rodney Morgan	Conservative	(1828–1854) Died 14 January 1854
1854, 6 February	John Lloyd Vaughan Watkins	Whig	Died 28 September 1865
1859, April	John Lloyd Vaughan Watkins	Liberal	Died 28 September 1865
1866, 27 February	John Pratt	Liberal	Became the 3rd Marquess Camden
1866, 3 October	Howel Gwyn	Conservative	Election declared void on petition
1869, 24 April	Edward Villiers	Liberal	Became the 5th Earl of Clarendon
1870, 19 July	James Gwynne-Holford	Conservative	
1880, 7 April	Cyril Flower	Liberal	
1885	Constituency abolished		

Back to Members of Parliament

== Elections ==
Decades:	1840s; 1850s; 1860s; 1870s; 1880s

=== Elections in the 1830s ===
General election 1830: Brecon
Party	Candidate	Votes	%
Whig	Charles Morgan	Unopposed	
Whig gain from Tory			

General election 1831: Brecon
Party	Candidate	Votes	%
Whig	Charles Morgan	Unopposed	
Registered electors		c. 21	
Whig hold			

General election 1832: Brecon
Party	Candidate	Votes	%
Whig	John Lloyd Vaughan Watkins	110	51.4
Tory	Charles Morgan	104	48.6
Majority		6	2.8
Turnout		214	88.4
Registered electors		242	
Whig hold			

General election 1835: Brecon
Party	Candidate	Votes	%
Conservative	Charles Morgan	Unopposed	
Registered electors		309	
Conservative gain from Whig			

General election 1837: Brecon
Party	Candidate	Votes	%
Conservative	Charles Morgan	156	60.5
Whig	John Lloyd	102	39.5
Majority		54	21.0
Turnout		258	76.1
Registered electors		339	
Conservative hold			

=== Elections in the 1840s ===
General election 1841: Brecon
Party	Candidate	Votes	%	±%
Conservative	Charles Rodney Morgan	Unopposed		
Registered electors		331		
Conservative hold				

General election 1847: Brecon
Party	Candidate	Votes	%	±%
Whig	John Lloyd Vaughan Watkins	Unopposed		
Registered electors		304		
Whig gain from Conservative				

=== Elections in the 1850s ===
General election 1852: Brecon
Party	Candidate	Votes	%	±%
Conservative	Charles Rodney Morgan	159	56.6	New
Whig	John Lloyd Vaughan Watkins	122	43.4	N/A
Majority		37	13.2	N/A
Turnout		281	83.6	N/A
Registered electors		336		
Conservative gain from Whig		Swing	N/A	

Morgan's death caused a by-election.

By-election, 6 February 1854: Brecon
Party	Candidate	Votes	%	±%
Whig	John Lloyd Vaughan Watkins	Unopposed		
Whig gain from Conservative				

General election 1857: Brecon
Party	Candidate	Votes	%	±%
Whig	John Lloyd Vaughan Watkins	Unopposed		
Registered electors		323		
Whig gain from Conservative				

General election 1859: Brecon
Party	Candidate	Votes	%	±%
Liberal	John Lloyd Vaughan Watkins	Unopposed		
Registered electors		302		
Liberal hold				

Back to Elections

=== Elections in the 1860s ===
General election 1865: Brecon
Party	Candidate	Votes	%	±%
Liberal	John Lloyd Vaughan Watkins	Unopposed		
Registered electors		281		
Liberal hold				

Watkins' death caused a by-election.

By-election, 27 Feb 1866: Brecon
Party	Candidate	Votes	%	±%
Liberal	John Pratt	Unopposed		
Liberal hold				

Pratt succeeded to the peerage, becoming 3rd Marquess of Camden, causing a by-election.

By-election, 3 Oct 1866: Brecon
Party	Candidate	Votes	%	±%
Conservative	Howel Gwyn	128	55.7	New
Liberal	Alfred Spencer-Churchill	102	44.3	N/A
Majority		26	11.4	N/A
Turnout		230	81.9	N/A
Registered electors		281		
Conservative gain from Liberal		Swing	N/A	

General election 1868: Brecon
Party	Candidate	Votes	%	±%
Conservative	Howel Gwyn	372	51.0	N/A
Liberal	Hugh Powell Price	357	49.0	N/A
Majority		15	2.0	N/A
Turnout		729	89.6	N/A
Registered electors		814		
Conservative gain from Liberal		Swing	N/A	

The election was declared void on petition, causing a by-election.

1869 Brecon by-election
Party	Candidate	Votes	%	±%
Liberal	Edward Villiers	391	54.4	+5.4
Conservative	Claud Hamilton	328	45.6	−5.4
Majority		63	8.8	N/A
Turnout		719	88.3	−1.3
Registered electors		814		
Liberal gain from Conservative		Swing	+5.4	

Back to Elections

=== Elections in the 1870s ===
Villiers succeeded to the peerage, becoming Earl of Clarendon, causing a by-election.

1870 Brecon by-election
Party	Candidate	Votes	%	±%
Conservative	James Gwynne-Holford	372	52.4	+1.4
Liberal	Hugh Powell Price	338	47.6	−1.4
Majority		34	4.8	+2.8
Turnout		710	87.2	−2.4
Registered electors		814		
Conservative hold		Swing	+1.4	

General election 1874: Brecon
Party	Candidate	Votes	%	±%
Conservative	James Gwynne-Holford	374	51.4	+0.4
Liberal	William Vaughan Morgan	353	48.6	−0.4
Majority		21	2.8	+0.8
Turnout		727	86.2	−3.4
Registered electors		843		
Conservative hold		Swing		

Back to Elections

=== Elections in the 1880s ===
General election 1880: Brecon
Party	Candidate	Votes	%	±%
Liberal	Cyril Flower	438	53.6	+5.0
Conservative	James Gwynne-Holford	379	46.4	−5.0
Majority		59	7.2	N/A
Turnout		817	92.8	+6.6
Registered electors		880		
Liberal gain from Conservative		Swing	+5.0	

Back to Elections

== Bibliography ==
- Boundaries of Parliamentary Constituencies 1885–1972, compiled and edited by F.W.S. Craig (Parliamentary Reference Publications 1972)
- British Parliamentary Election Results 1832–1885, compiled and edited by F.W.S. Craig (Macmillan Press 1977)
- The House of Commons 1509–1558, by S.T. Bindoff (Secker & Warburg 1982)
- The House of Commons 1558–1603, by P.W. Hasler (HMSO 1981)
- The House of Commons 1715–1754, by Romney Sedgwick (HMSO 1970)
- The House of Commons 1754–1790, by Sir Lewis Namier and John Brooke (HMSO 1964)
- The Parliaments of England by Henry Stooks Smith (1st edition published in three volumes 1844–50), second edition edited (in one volume) by F.W.S. Craig (Political Reference Publications 1973)
- Leigh Rayment's Historical List of MPs – Constituencies beginning with "B" (part 5)
