= James Gwynne-Holford =

British Conservative politician

James Gwynne-Holford MP

Member of Parliament for Brecon
- In office 19 July 1870 – 7 April 1880
- Preceded by: Edward Villiers
- Succeeded by: Cyril Flower

Personal details
- Born: 25 November 1833
- Died: 6 February 1916 (aged 82)
- Party: Conservative

James Price William Gwynne-Holford (25 November 1833 – 6 February 1916) was a British Conservative politician.

Gwynne-Holford was elected MP for Brecon at a by-election in 1870, and held the seat until 1880.

== Personal life ==
Gwynne-Holford was born in Llansantffraed, Brecon, son of Colonel James Price Gwynne-Holford, Buckland Hall and his wife, Anna Maria Eleanor, daughter of Roderick Gwynne, Glebran. The father died in 1846.

He married Eleanor Gordon-Canning in 1891 at St James's Church, Hanover Square, London. They had one daughter.

He was educated at Eton College and Christ Church, Oxford. After a short military career he retired to his country estates at Cilgwyn and Buckland, and took an active part in the public life of Brecknockshire. He served as High Sheriff of the county in 1857.

== Political career ==
In 1870, Lord Hyde, MP for Brecon, was promoted to the House of Lords. Gwynne-Holford stood in the by-election to elect a successor, capturing the seat to the Conservatives. He succeeded in retaining the seat in the 1874 general election but lost to the Liberal Cyril Flower at the general election of 1880.

Between 1888 and 1896 he served as a member of Breconshire County Council.

Gwynne-Holford died in 1916.

Parliament of the United Kingdom
Preceded by Lord Hyde	Member of Parliament for Brecon; 1870–1880	Succeeded by Cyril Flower
