= Roger Vaughan of Porthamal =

Member of the Parliament of England

Sir Roger Vaughan of Port Hamal was a 16th-century Welsh landowner and Member of Parliament.

He served on a commission to survey church plate in Brecknockshire and Herefordshire in 1543. He was knighted in 1549 and was appointed High Sheriff of Brecknockshire for 1551–52. He was included in Queen Mary's pardon roll of 1553, and received the stewardship of the castles and lordships of Huntingdon and Kington in 1554.

He was elected Member of Parliament for Breconshire in 1553 (to 1554) and again in 1559 (to 1562). He represented the borough of Brecon from 1562 to 1571 before returning again to represent the county in 1571, during which Parliament he died in office.

He had married Catherine, daughter of Sir George Herbert of Swansea, with whom he had several children. Their eldest son, Watkin, died childless and the estate passed to Catherine, daughter of the second son, Rowland, who married Sir Robert Knollys.
