= Charles Morley (Liberal politician) =

British politician

Charles Morley

Charles Morley (27 November 1847 – 27 October 1917), was a British Liberal Party politician.

== Background ==
He was part of a family of Liberal politicians; he was the third son of Samuel Morley MP, and older brother to the Rt Hon. Arnold Morley MP. One of his older brothers was the businessman Baron Hollenden. He was educated at Trinity College, Cambridge (BA 1870; MA 1874).

== Career ==
He was Honorary Secretary to the Royal College of Music. He was a partner in the firm of Messrs I. and R. Morley, of Wood Street, London. He was a justice of the peace for Berkshire and Somerset.

== Political career ==
He was Liberal candidate for the Somerset East Division at the 1892 General Election but was unable to gain the seat from the Liberal Unionist. He was Liberal candidate for the Breconshire Division at the 1895 General Election in succession to the retiring Liberal MP, William Fuller-Maitland. The constituency had returned Liberals at every election since 1875 and Morley had no trouble holding the seat;

At the 1900 General Election he was re-elected at Breconshire, unopposed. He retired from parliament just before the 1906 General Election.

=== Election results ===
General election 1895: Breconshire Electorate 10,849
Party	Candidate	Votes	%	±%
Liberal	Charles Morley	4,594	55.9	
Conservative	Thomas Wood	3,631	44.1	
Majority		963	11.8	
Turnout			75.8	
Liberal hold		Swing		

Parliament of the United Kingdom
Preceded by William Fuller-Maitland	Member of Parliament for Breconshire; 1895–1906	Succeeded by Sidney Robinson
