= Arthur Turner (judge) =

Irish judge

Arthur Turner (c. 1635 - 1684) was a short-lived Irish judge of English birth.

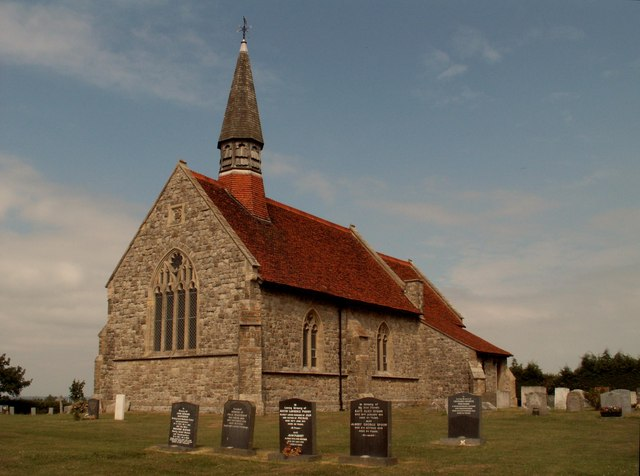
St. Lawrence, Essex, Turner's birthplace

He was born at St. Lawrence, Essex, second son of the Reverend Edward Turner, vicar of the parish. He entered the Middle Temple in 1660 and was called to the Bar in 1666. In 1673 he came to Ireland as attorney for Irish affairs to the future King James II of England. He became King's counsel in 1679, Recorder of Kilkenny in 1680 and Constable of Dublin Castle in 1680-1.

In 1682, despite his chronic ill-health, which forced him to visit England regularly to seek medical advice, he was appointed junior justice of the Court of Common Pleas (Ireland). He managed to act as a judge of assize in 1683, but he was by then a very sick man, and died in 1684.

He married Dorothea Jeffreys of Abercynrig, Brecon, only daughter of Colonel John Jeffreys, first master of the Royal Hospital Kilmainham, and Mary Bassett of Fledborough; Dorothea was the heiress to considerable estates in Wales. After Turner's death, she remarried Captain Thomas Flower of Finglas, in defiance of her father's command that she should never marry an Irishman. She died before 1700, leaving issue. Her Welsh estates passed to her stepson William Flower, 1st Baron Castle Durrow.

== Sources ==
- Ball, F. Elrington The Judges in Ireland 1221-1921 London John Murray 1926
- Burke's Peerage 106th Edition Switzerland 1999
- Falkiner, Caesar Litton His Majesty's Castle of Dublin" Appendix 1: Constables of Dublin Castle
- Henning, D. B. ed. "Jeffreys, John (c.1636-1689) of the Priory, Brecon" The History of Parliament- the House of Commons 1660-1690 (1983)
