= Ludovic Lewis =

Welsh politician

Ludovic (or Lewis) Lewis was a Welsh politician who sat in the House of Commons from 1647 to 1653.

Lewis was the son of Sir William Lewis, 1st Baronet. In 1647, he was elected Member of Parliament for Brecon. He appears to have survived Pride's Purge to sit in the Rump Parliament

Lewis died presumably before his father in 1677 as he did not become baronet.

Lewis married Catherine Bickle, daughter of Sir Christopher Bickle of Banstead, Surrey. One of his daughters married John Lewis (of Coed Mawr), who was MP for Cardiganshire in 1685.

Parliament of England
Preceded by Herbert Price	Member of Parliament for Brecon; 1647–1653	Succeeded by Not represented in Barebones Parliament
