= David Williams (Welsh judge) =

Sixteenth century Welsh judge and member of Parliament

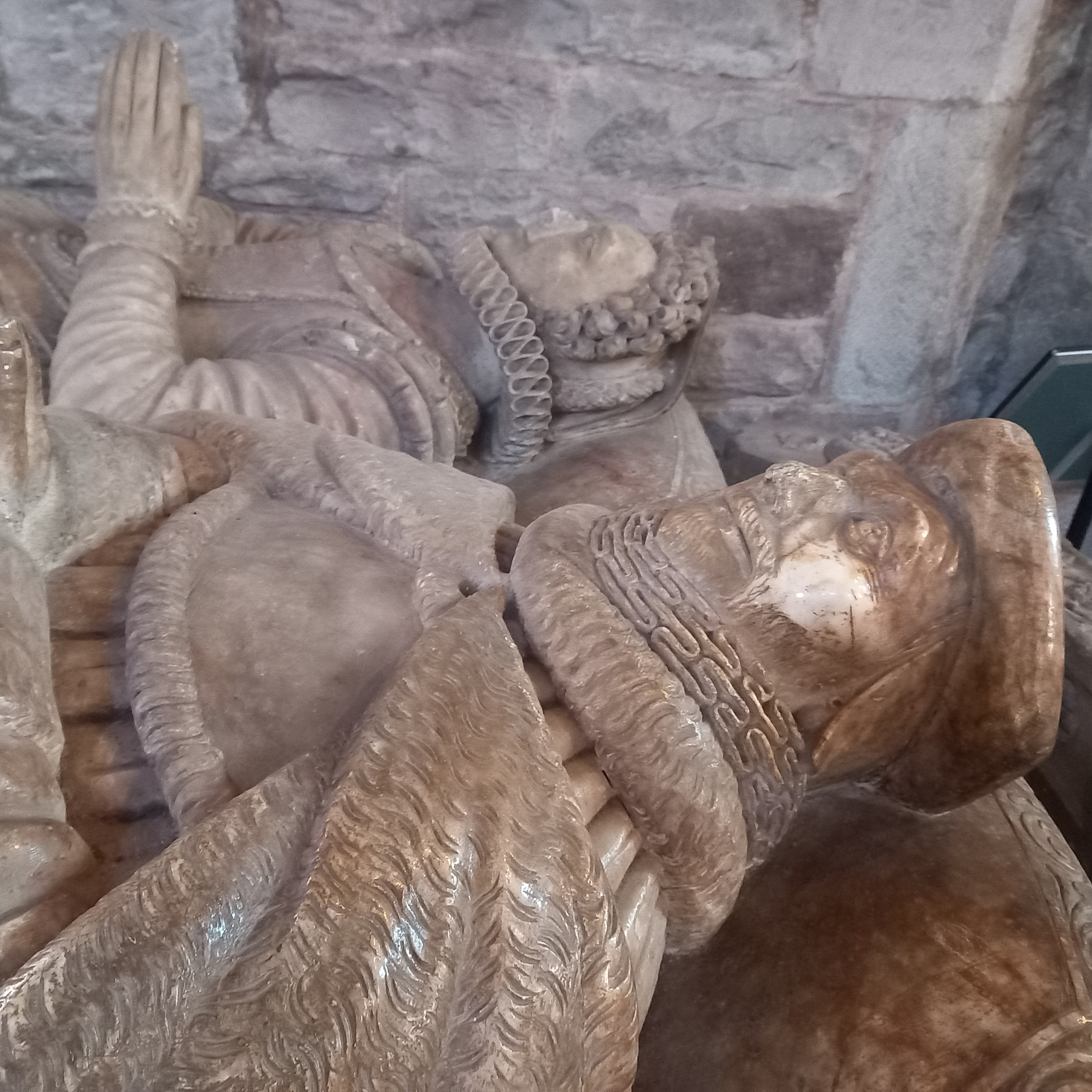
The effigy tomb of Sir David Williams and his first wife, Margaret, in Brecon Cathedral.

Sir David Williams (c. 1536 – 22 January 1613), was a Welsh lawyer, Member of Parliament for Brecon in the late 1500s and Justice of the King's Bench from 1604.

== Early life and career ==
David Williams was born in about 1536, the youngest son of Gwilym ap John Vychan, of Ystradfellte in Brecknockshire (now Powys), a prosperous yeoman who was a cousin of Sir John Prise. In 1576, Willams was called to the bar from the Middle Temple. He became attorney-general for five counties of South Wales from 1581 to 1585, recorder of Brecon and Carmarthen from 1587 to 1604 and Member of Parliament for Brecon from 1584 to 1593 and 1597 to 1604. In 1593, he was made a sergeant-at-law. He was knighted by King James I and appointed a Justice of the King's Bench in 1604.

== Family ==
Williams married twice; firstly Margaret (or Margery), the daughter of John Games of Aberbrân, by whom they had nine sons and two daughters. Secondly in 1597, he married Dorothy, daughter of Oliver Wellesborne of East Hanney and the widow of John Latton of Kingston Bagpuze, by whom they had one son and one daughter. The eldest son, Henry (c. 1579–1636), succeeded his father as Member of Parliament for Brecon in 1603.

== Later life and death ==
Besides his income from legal work, Williams acquired a large portfolio of property, mostly in South Wales and the Welsh Marches. Queen Elizabeth I granted him the manor of Glasbury and in 1600 he purchased Gwernyfed, a mansion at Felindre near Brecon, as his family seat. This was used mainly by his eldest son, since he spent most of his time at Serjeant's Inn in London or at another of his residences, Kingston Hall in Kingston Bagpuize, Berkshire (now Oxfordshire). He died at Kingston on 22 January 1613; his entrails were buried there but his other remains were interred at the Priory Church in Brecon, now Brecon Cathedral. A fine alabaster tomb effigy depicts him lying in his judge's robes alongside his first wife; it was initially sited in the chancel, but was moved twice during restorations in the 19th and 20th centuries and now stands in the south aisle. In his will, Williams left his "best scarlet robes" to his close friend, Peter Warburton, "praying him that as he hath been a good and kind brother unto me, so he will be a good and kind friend to my children". His estates in Wales were bequeathed to his eldest son, Henry.
