= Howel Gwyn =

British politician

Howel Gwyn (24 June 1806 – 25 January 1888) of Dyffryn, Neath, was a British Conservative politician, who represented Penryn and Falmouth (1847–57) and Brecon (1866–68).

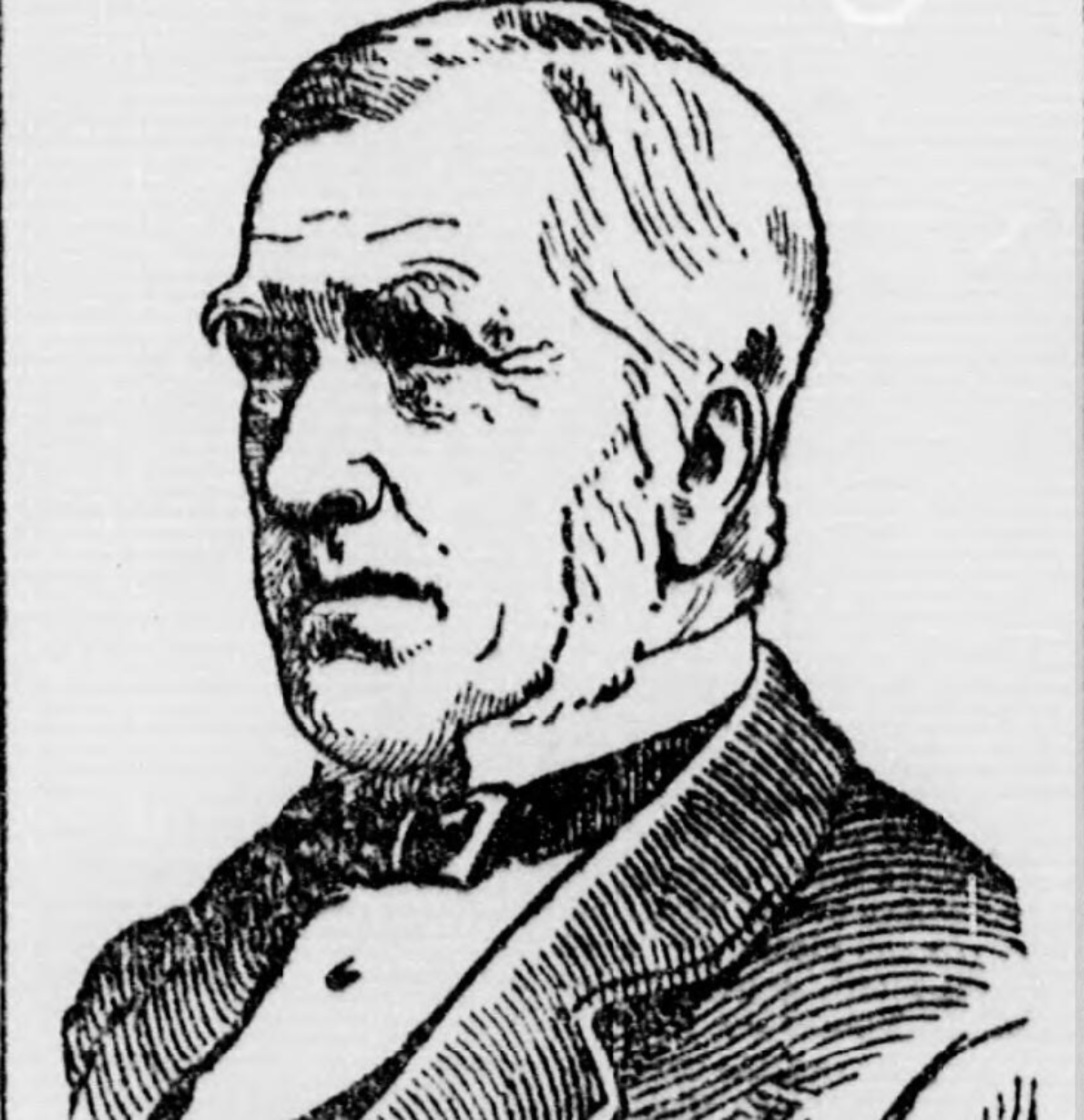
Howel Gwyn MP

== Early life ==
Gwyn was the son of William Gwyn and Mary Anne Roberts. His mother was the daughter of John Roberts of Barnstaple, Devon. He was educated privately at Neath and at Swansea Grammar School.

== Public life ==
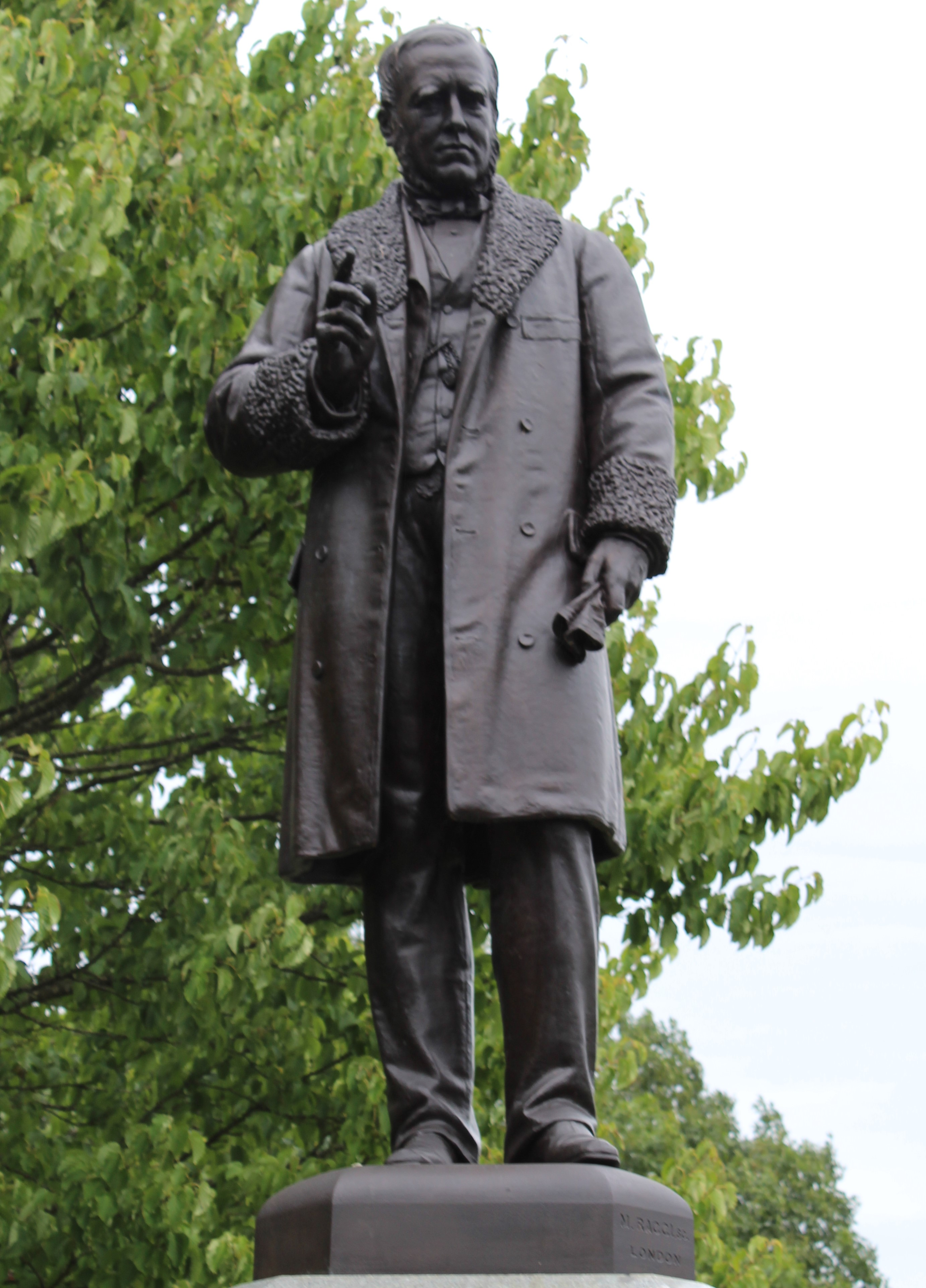
Statue of Gwyn, Victoria Gardens, Neath,1889, by Mario Raggi

Gwyn participated in the public life of several Welsh counties. He was High Sheriff of Glamorgan in 1837, of Carmarthenshire in 1838 and of Breconshire in 1844.

Gwyn successfully contested Penryn and Falmouth at the 1847 General Election and continued to represent the borough until 1857. He represented Brecon from 1866 until 1869 when he was unseated by petition. Having been returned for Brecon in 1868 it was generally accepted that his supporters had been caught engaged in bribery. The following year, a petition was brought forward to unseat him due to allegations of bribery and illegal activities. Gwyn was largely exonerated personally but the charges were upheld and his election annulled in April 1869.

In 1874 he unsuccessfully contested the Brecknock constituency against W Fuller Maitland.

== Later life and death ==
Gwyn played a prominent role in the public life of the Borough of Neath and contributed land towards the building of a hall, known as the Gwyn Hall.

He died at his home in 1888. The radical Welsh language newspaper, Tarian y Gweithiwr, recalled him as an old-fashioned Conservative who was a staunch defender of the Church of England.

Parliament of the United Kingdom
Preceded by John Vivian; James Hanway Plumridge	Member of Parliament for Penryn and Falmouth; 1847–1857; With: Francis Mowatt (1847–52); James Freshfield (1852–57)	Succeeded by Thomas Baring; Samuel Gurney
