= Henry Williams (died 1636) =

17th-century English politician

Sir Henry Williams (c. 1579–1636) was an English politician who sat in the House of Commons at various times between 1601 and 1624.

Williams was the eldest son of David Williams, the judge, of Gwernyfed and his first wife. He was probably educated at Shrewsbury School in 1589 and was admitted at St John's College, Oxford on 16 April 1594, aged 15. He entered Middle Temple in 1594.

In 1601, he was elected Member of Parliament for Brecon. He was knighted on 23 July 1603. In 1604 he was re-elected MP for Brecon. He succeeded to the Welsh estates of his father at Gwernyfed, Aberllyfni in 1613 and was appointed High Sheriff of Breconshire for 1614–15. In 1621 he was elected MP for Breconshire He was re-elected MP for Breconshire in 1624 and served a second term as Sheriff for 1627.

Williams married Elinor Whitney, daughter of Eustace Whitney of Whitney, Herefordshire. They had seven sons including Sir Henry Williams, 1st Baronet, who became a baronet, and four daughters.

Parliament of England
Preceded by David Williams	Member of Parliament for Brecon; 1601–1611	Succeeded by Sir John Crompton
Preceded by Sir Charles Vaughan	Member of Parliament for Breconshire; 1621–1624	Succeeded by Sir Charles Vaughan
