= Lord Arthur John Henry Somerset =

English politician

The Right Honourable Arthur Somerset MP

Member of Parliament for Monmouthshire
- In office 1805–1816
- Preceded by: James Rooke, Sir Charles Gould Morgan
- Succeeded by: Sir Charles Gould Morgan, Lord Granville Somerset

Personal details
- Born: 12 February 1780
- Died: 18 April 1816 (aged 36) Lisbon, Kingdom of Portugal
- Spouse: Elizabeth Boscawen
- Children: 3
- Parent(s): Henry Somerset, 5th Duke of Beaufort; Elizabeth Boscawen
- Education: Eton College
- Occupation: Soldier

Lord Arthur John Henry Somerset (12 February 1780 – 18 April 1816), English politician, was the sixth son of Henry Somerset, 5th Duke of Beaufort.

== Early years ==
He was educated at Oriel College, Oxford, taking a BA in 1799 and an MA in 1803. Later that year he was commissioned as captain (24 June) and then major in the Monmouth and Brecon Militia, commanded by his elder brother the 6th Duke. Somerset was then commissioned as a lieutenant in the 7th Foot of the Regular Army on 19 May 1804.

== Political career ==
He was defeated at Gloucester in August 1805, but in November, was returned as Member of Parliament for Monmouthshire and was appointed a deputy lieutenant of Monmouthshire and Breconshire in December. On 26 June 1806, he was made a captain in the 4th West India Regiment and on 2 October exchanged into the 91st Foot.

== Family ==
Lord Arthur married his first cousin, Hon. Elizabeth Boscawen (bef. 1793 – 2 March 1872), daughter of George Boscawen, 3rd Viscount Falmouth, on 23 June 1808. They had three children:

- Rev. George Somerset (30 March 1809 – 12 October 1882), married Philida Elizabeth Call, daughter of Sir William Call, 2nd Baronet on 9 September 1835 and had issue. He was rector of St Mabyn, Cornwall.
- Elizabeth Anne Somerset (2 August 1810 – 12 April 1835)
- Arthur Edward Somerset (28 August 1813 – 9 September 1853), married his first cousin, Hon. Frances Boscawen, daughter of Rev. Hon. John Evelyn Boscawen, and had issue.

== Death ==
Somerset moved into the 19th Light Dragoons on 12 September 1811, serving until his death in Lisbon in 1816.

== Ancestry ==
Ancestors of Lord Arthur John Henry Somerset

Charles Somerset, Marquess of Worcester
Henry Somerset, 2nd Duke of Beaufort
Rebecca Child
Charles Somerset, 4th Duke of Beaufort
Wriothesley Noel, 2nd Earl of Gainsborough
Rachel Noel
Catherine Greville
Henry Somerset, 5th Duke of Beaufort
Richard Berkeley
John Symes Berkeley
Elizabeth Symes
Elizabeth Berkeley
Walter Norborne
Elizabeth Norborne
Frances Bacon
Lord Arthur John Henry Somerset
Edward Boscawen (MP)
Hugh Boscawen, 1st Viscount Falmouth
Jael Godolphin
Admiral Rt. Hon. Edward Boscawen
Col. Charles Godfrey
Charlotte Godfrey
Arabella Churchill
Elizabeth Boscawen
George Evelyn, MP for Bletchingley
William Evelyn Glanville, High Sheriff of Kent
Frances Broomhall
Frances Evelyn Glanville
William Glanville, Barrister of Middle Temple
Frances Glanville
Frances Hales

Parliament of the United Kingdom
Preceded by James Rooke; Sir Charles Gould Morgan	Member of Parliament for Monmouthshire; 1805–1816; With: Sir Charles Gould Morgan	Succeeded by Sir Charles Gould Morgan; Lord Granville Somerset
