= February 1866 Brecon by-election =

UK parliamentary by-election

The February 1866 Brecon by-election was held on 27 February 1866. The by-election arose following the death of the previous Liberal MP, John Lloyd Vaughan Watkins.

== Candidates ==
Brecon had one of the smallest electorates in Wales and the political life of the borough had long been dominated by the Camden and Tredegar families. The Camden interest, which generally followed a Whig form of Liberalism had generally supported Watkins since 1832 but on two occasions he had been defeated when the Conservative influence of the Tredegar interest was brought to bear. Within days of the former member's death, the Earl of Brecknock, son and heir of the Marquees of Camden had issued an address. Although described as a Liberal-Conservative, it was apparent that Breaknock would take a Liberal view on party questions and the Tredegar interest sought a candidate. They soon settled upon Howel Gwyn of Dyffryn, Neath, a former MP for Penryn and Falmouth.

The initial expectation, as described by one newspaper, was for a closely fought contest, for the two political factions in the town were thought to be fairly evenly matched. At the same time, in the shadow of the debate on parliamentary reform, there was a feeling that the Conservatives might prevail. Brecon, it was argued, 'like most small agricultural towns had a sympathy towards 'those who are averse to great organic changes in the constitution''. Brecknock's initial address was in many ways indistinguishable to that of Gwyn, and was lukewarm on the key issues of parliamentary reform and the rights of nonconformists.

Within the week, Gwyn had officially declared his candidature and it was felt that this would compel Brecknock to ally himself more firmly with the official policies of the Liberal Party. When his father, the 2nd Marquis of Camden, was made Lord Lieutenant of the Brecknockshire in succession to the late Col. Watkins, Brecknock unequivocally declared his support for the Palmerston administration.

== Candidature of Thomas Price ==
The radical wing of the Liberal Party watched these developments with concern. Thomas Savin, the railway contractor, was named at an early stage as a possible contender but would not split the Liberal camp. Breakneck, at one stage, was said to have implied that he would support the abolition of church rates, but no firm commitment was subsequently made. As a result, Thomas Price of Aberdare, a prominent Welsh nonconformist minister and a native of Brecon, offered himself as a Liberal candidate. This was first mooted in December, for example at a meeting of the Gwron Lodge of the Alfredian Order at Aberdare. On 18 December, Price visited Brecon and issued an address the following day. Price had connections with Brecon since his younger days and he stated in his address:

I have waited with considerable interest, but hitherto in vain, hoping that a gentleman of local influence and of advanced liberal principles would come forward to seek your suffrages; neither of the candidates now before the electors is prepared to advocate measures that would have had the hearty support of your late respected Member; and, firmlv believing that neither of the addresses already issued contains & programme suitable to the wishes of the great majority of the Independent Electors of the Borough of Brecon, or the wants of the period in which we live, I beg most respectfully to offer myself as a candidate for the honour of representing my native town in Parliament.

On 8 January, Brecknock issued a revised address, which was subsequently regarded as a response to Price's intervention. He alluded to the death of Palmerston and the formation of a new administration under Lord John Russell pledged to extending the franchise. Breakneck now declared himself in favour of reform as well as the abolition of church rates.

On 24 January 1866, Price addressed a packed meeting held at the Town Hall, with hundreds reportedly failing to gain admittance. The speech he gave on this occasion was regarded as 'a very remarkable performance'.

== Outcome ==
Price eventually withdrew, in view of Brecknock's second address, stating that he had achieved his objective of assisting 'the advanced Liberals in saving the borough from being quietly handed over unto stale Whigism on the one hand, or worn out Toryism on the other'. The failure of the Brecon Liberals to sustain the momentum, at a subsequent by-election some months later when Brecknock was elevated to the Lords upon the death of his father, convinced Price of the necessity of concentrating on the extension of the franchise and the abolition of small boroughs such as Brecon which were so heavily influenced by deference to a landed elite. Two years later, at the General Election of 1868, he played a central role in the contest in the Merthyr Tydfil constituency.

== Bibliography ==
- Jones, Ieuan Gwynedd (1964). "Dr Thomas Price and the election of 1868 in Merthyr Tydfil: a study in nonconformist politics (Part One)" (PDF). Welsh History Review. 2 (2): 147–172.
- Jones, Ieuan Gwynedd (1965). "Dr Thomas Price and the election of 1868 in Merthyr Tydfil: a study in nonconformist politics (Part Two)" (PDF). Welsh History Review. 2 (3): 251–70.
