= Sir Robert Salusbury, 1st Baronet =

British politician

Sir Robert Salusbury, 1st Baronet (10 September 1756 – 17 November 1817) was a British Member of Parliament.

He was the eldest son of Robert Salusbury of Cotton Hall, Denbighshire and educated at Trinity College, Cambridge (1775) before studying law from 1776 at Lincoln's Inn, where he was called to the bar in 1785.

He was a Member of Parliament (MP) for Monmouthshire from 1792 to 1796 and for Brecon from 1796 to 1812. He was made a baronet on 4 May 1795 and was High Sheriff of Monmouthshire for 1786–87.

In 1780, he married Catherine, daughter and eventual heiress of Charles Van of Llanwern. They had three sons and two daughters. In 1816, he was jailed in the King's Bench Prison for bankruptcy and died at Canterbury in 1817.

Parliament of Great Britain
Preceded by James Rooke; John Morgan	Member of Parliament for Monmouthshire; 1792 – 1796; With: James Rooke	Succeeded by James Rooke; Charles Gould Morgan
Preceded by Charles Gould Morgan	Member of Parliament for Brecon; 1796 – 1800	Succeeded by Parliament of the United Kingdom
Parliament of the United Kingdom
Preceded by Parliament of Great Britain	Member of Parliament for Brecon; 1801 – 1812	Succeeded by George Gould Morgan
Baronetage of Great Britain
New creation	Baronet (of Llanwern); 1795 – 1817	Succeeded by Thomas Robert Salusbury
