= Samuel Wightwick =

Samuel Wightwick was an English lawyer and politician who sat in the House of Commons in 1659.

Wightwick was the younger son of Francis Wightwick of Great Bloxham, Staffordshire. He was admitted a student of the Inner Temple in November 1629 (then styled as of Clifford's Inn). In 1638, he was called to be "an Associate of the Bench" but was not chosen a Bencher, though he was so erroneously described in 1652. He was Prothonotary of the Upper Bench under the Commonwealth, and petitioned the Committee for the Advance of Money on 12 January 1646, as follows

" I am joint patentee with Robert Henley (who was assessed at £2000 on 18 October 1643) in the office of Prothonotary of the King's Bench, and I agreed that he should have the profits of the office except 1/12 for me, and I gave a bond for £20,000 to his executors, if he should die, and he did the same as to my 1/12. I have always been forward for Parliament in co. Berks, in the committee for the associated counties, and have had my house and goods plundered, and my eldest son carried from his house prisoner, and most cruelly used, almost to death, and I have 8 children. I beg that if Mr. Henley be adjudged incapable of the office for delinquency, the whole office then being mine by right, you will consider my interest and care, and add something to my 1/12".

He bought from the Treason Trustees some houses in Drury Lane forfeited by William Lord Craven, which were discharged from sequestration on 17 March 1646. On 29 May 1655, he appears to have been acting on some commission for the Council of State when his name is mentioned in Cal. State Papers. In 1659, he was elected Member of Parliament for Brecon. In 1662, he was Joint Chief Clerk with Robert Henley for enrolling pleas in the King's Bench.

Wightwick married Abigail Wright of Brookset, Essex, and his four sons, Samuel, Peter, George and Francis, were all admitted as members of the Inner Temple.

Parliament of England
Preceded by Not represented in Second Protectorate Parliament	Member of Parliament for Brecon; 1659	Succeeded by Not represented in Restored Rump
