= John Morgan (of Dderw) =

Welsh politician

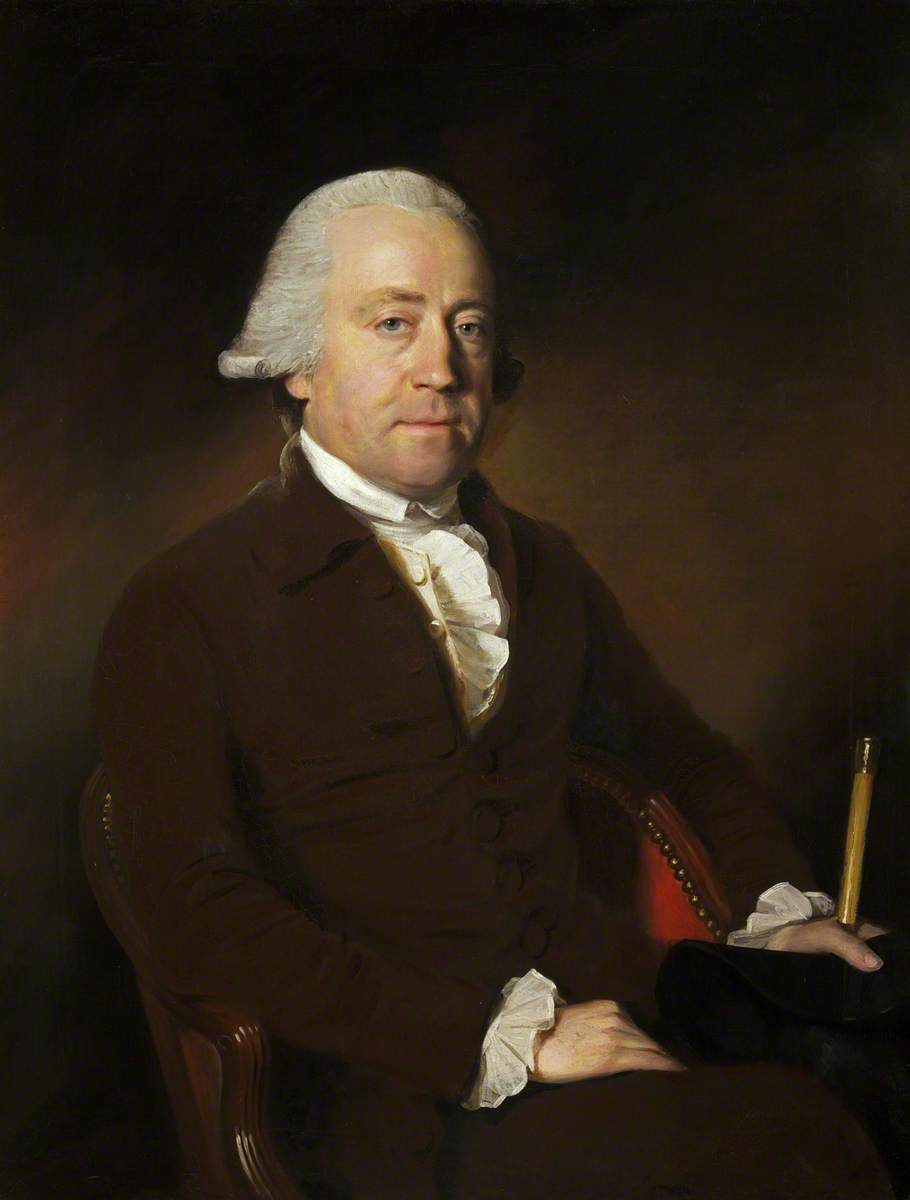
- Born: 18 February 1742
- Died: 27 June 1792 (aged 50)
- Spouse: Louisa Pym Burt
- Father: Thomas Morgan

John Morgan (18 February 1742 – 27 June 1792) was a Welsh politician who sat in the House of Commons from 1769 to 1792.

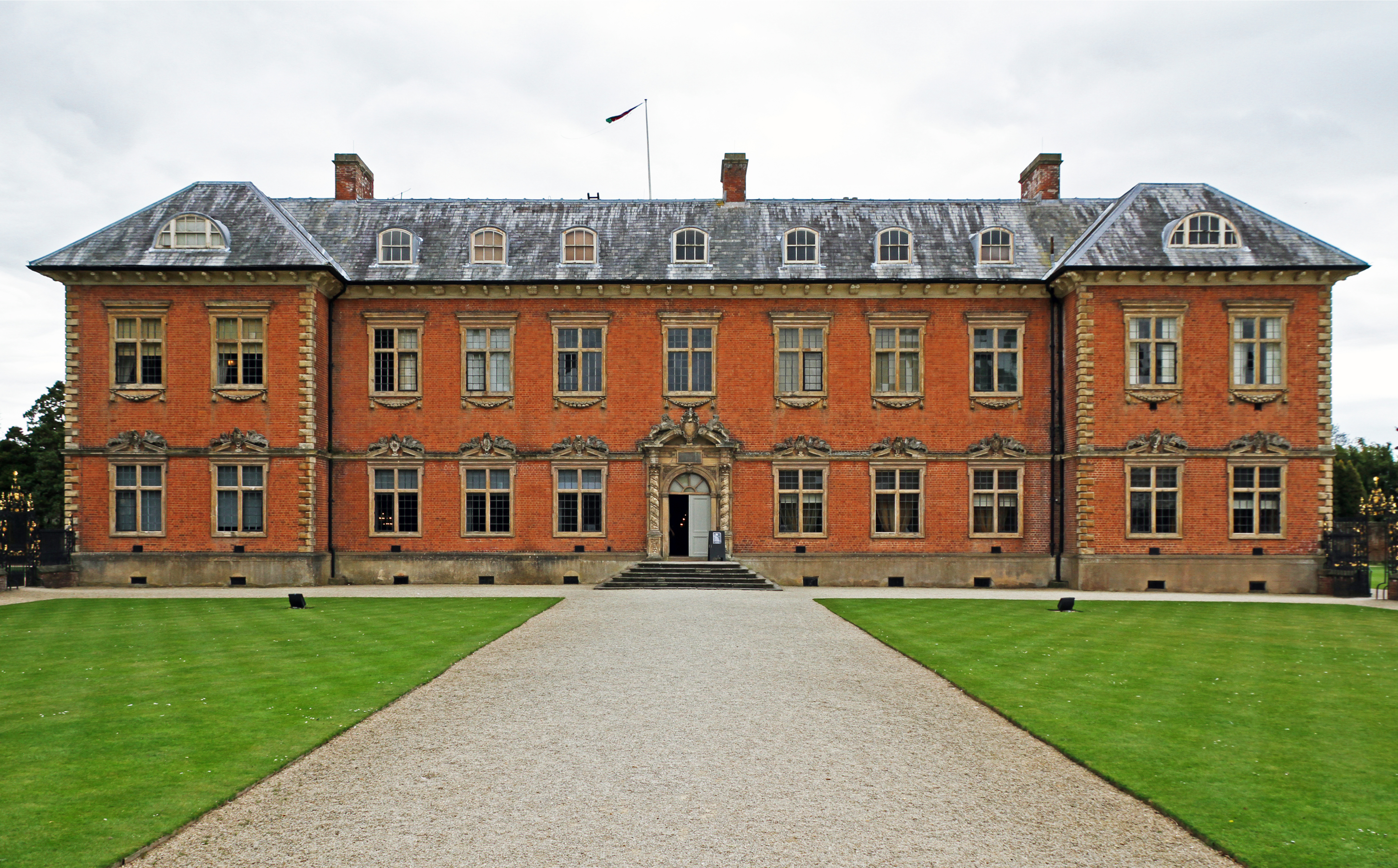
Tredegar House

Morgan was the youngest son of Thomas Morgan and his wife, Jane Colchester.

He entered the House of Commons in 1769 as Member of Parliament for Brecon, succeeding his brother Charles Morgan. In 1771, he accepted the Stewardship of the Manor of East Hendred in order to enter the by-election at Monmouthshire, replacing his late brother Thomas Morgan. Unusually, given the immense Morgan influence in Brecknockshire and Monmouthshire, the election was contested, albeit unsuccessfully, by Valentine Morris.

His elder brothers having died without issue, John Morgan inherited the Tredegar Estate in 1787. Finding himself in urgent need of an heir, he married Louisa Pym Burt, a woman who was more than twenty-five years his junior. Unfortunately, the marriage did not result in any children, and when John Morgan died in 1792, the Tredegar Estate passed by arrangement to his sister Jane and her husband Sir Charles Gould, on condition they changed their name to Morgan.

Parliament of Great Britain
Preceded by Charles Morgan	Member of Parliament for Brecon; 1769–1771	Succeeded by Charles Van
Preceded by Thomas Morgan; John Hanbury	Member of Parliament for Monmouthshire; 1771–1792; With: John Hanbury 1771–84; Viscount Nevill 1784–85; James Rooke 1785–92	Succeeded by James Rooke; Robert Salusbury
