= John Jeffreys (died 1689) =

Welsh soldier, landowner and politician

John Jeffreys (c.1623-1689) was a Welsh soldier, landowner and politician, much of whose career was spent in Ireland. He fought in the English Civil War on the Royalist side, and later sat in the Houses of Commons of both England and Ireland. He is best remembered as the first Master of the Royal Hospital Kilmainham.

== Background and early career ==
He was born at Abercynrig, Brecon, eldest son of Jeffrey Jeffreys and Margaret Price, daughter of Thomas Price (d. 1654) of the Priory, also in Brecon. His father and grandfather were prosperous mercers, and by 1620 his father was wealthy enough to buy Abercynrig, and to marry the eventual heiress of The Priory, which became his son's favourite home in later life. John had succeeded to his father's estates by 1647. He entered the Inner Temple in 1640 and proceeded to Gray's Inn in 1641, but was apparently not called to the Bar. His legal knowledge was useful to him in his career, when he served as a Court registrar in Ireland.

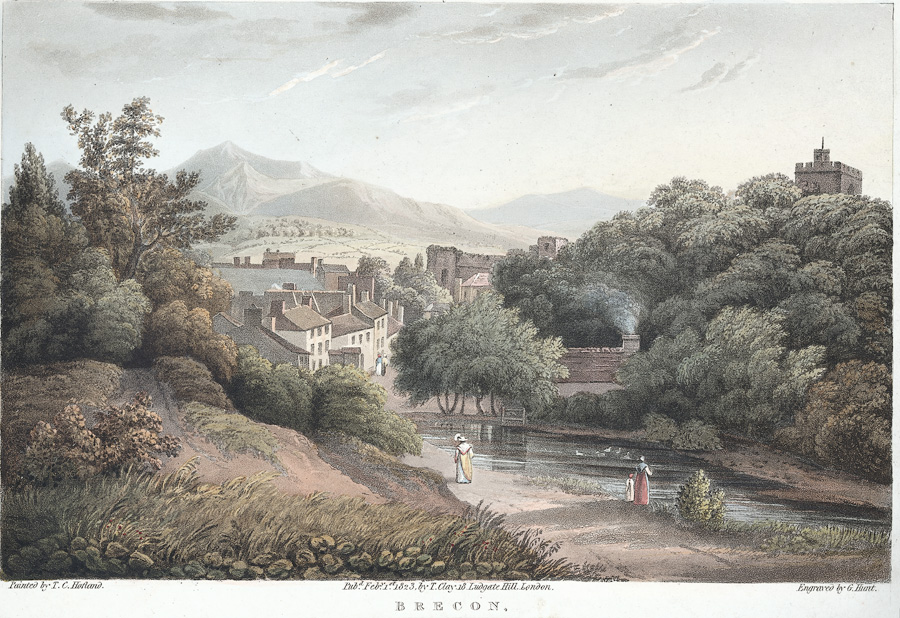
Brecon, 1823

During the English Civil War he was Lieutenant Colonel of a brigade of infantry fighting on the Royalist side, and gave valiant service to the Royalist cause, as shown by the various rewards which were proposed for him at the Restoration of Charles II. These rewards never materialised; and though he entered the Cavalier Parliament as MP for Breconshire in 1661 he was unseated a few months later.

== In Ireland ==
By his own account, his services to the King during the Civil War had left his fortune so depleted that he was obliged to move to Ireland to save what was left of his estates. He made the move in about 1664. He acquired an invaluable Irish patron in James Butler, 1st Duke of Ormonde, who found a commission for him in the Irish Army, and probably arranged for him to enter the Irish House of Commons as member for Antrim (a newly created seat) in 1666. He became joint registrar to the Court of Claims which was up set under the Act of Settlement 1662 to adjudicate on disputed claims to lands forfeited under the Cromwellian regime. His post was said to be worth £8000 per annum. He was Constable of Dublin Castle from 1673 to 1680. His fortunes improved, although he was still in debt in 1672; he sold Abercynrig in 1664, but was later able to repurchase it, and also bought property in Carmarthen.

=== MP for Brecon ===
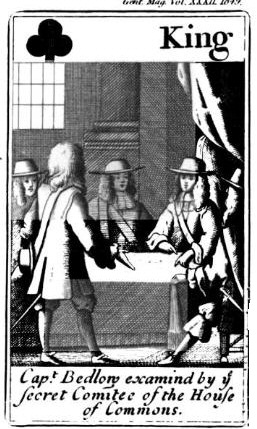
Popular playing card: an episode in the Popish Plot featuring the informer William Bedloe, whom Jeffreys knew and distrusted

He continued to take a keen interest in home politics. In 1679 he finally succeeded in entering the English House of Commons as member for Brecon, and sat for Brecon in every Parliament until 1689. He was a fairly conscientious member, especially during the second Exclusion Parliament of 1680–81, in which he sat on six committees. He was a firm opponent of Exclusion, and was praised for unspecified "services" in rallying opposition to it. He was a complete sceptic about the Popish Plot, due to his personal knowledge of one of the principal informers, the notorious confidence trickster William Bedloe, "infamous Bedloe". He was also a burgess of Brecon.

=== Master of Kilmainham Hospital ===
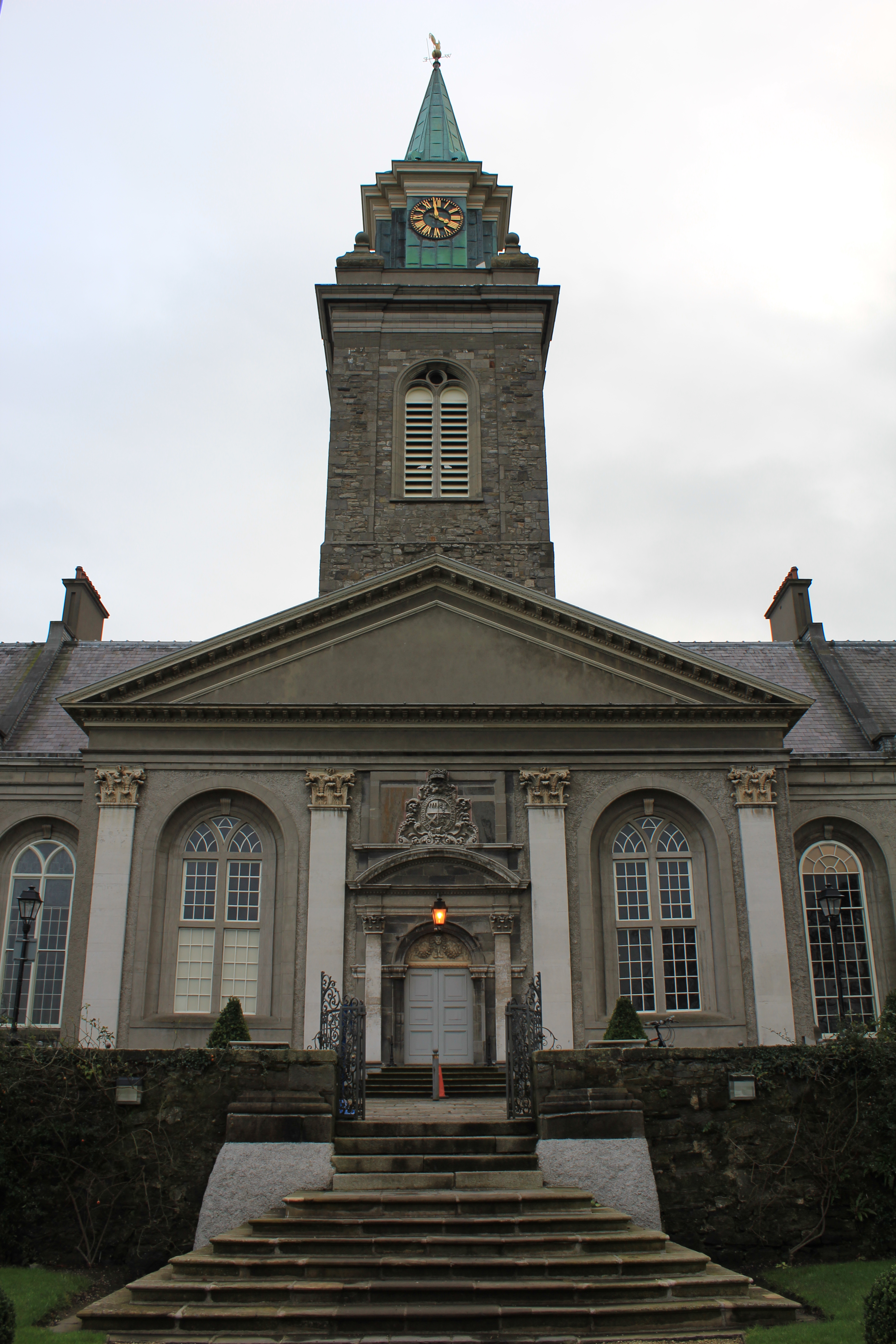
Royal Hospital Kilmainham, of which Jeffreys was appointed the first Master in 1684

In 1684 when the Royal Hospital Kilmainham for old soldiers was founded, Sir Leoline Jenkins, the Secretary of State, a fellow Welshman and lifelong friend of Jeffreys, persuaded Ormonde, the founder, to accept Jeffreys as the first Master. Ormonde would have preferred a serving soldier, but Jenkins urged that Jeffreys "hath spent all his time and almost all his estate in the King's service, and hath done so with a very clear reputation". The salary of £300 a year was no doubt welcome to Jeffreys, even though, despite Jenkins' reference to his poverty, he was probably clear of debt by this time. James II, who succeeded to the throne the following year, continued him in office, despite his rumoured opposition to repeal the Test Act, on account of his "long service and sufferings". James also took seriously Jeffreys' petition of 1686 pleading for more resources: it seems that within two years of the hospital's foundation most of the original sources of funding had dried up.

== Death and family ==
He died in the spring of 1689 and was buried in Carmarthen, where he owned substantial property. This was against his own expressed wishes, as he had quarrelled with the municipal authorities in Carmarthen.

He married Mary Bassett, daughter of Edward Bassett of Fledborough, Nottinghamshire and Elizabeth Pigott of Aston, Oxfordshire, and had one surviving daughter and heiress, Dorothea. She married firstly the English-born judge Arthur Turner, justice of the Court of Common Pleas (Ireland), who died prematurely in 1684. She remarried Thomas Flower of Durrow, County Laois and Finglas, eldest son of Sir William Flower, MP and member of the Privy Council, thus disobeying her father's command never to marry an Irishman. They had a son Jeffreys and a daughter Catherine (who died young); Dorothea died before Flower, sometime before 1700. Having disregarded her father's instructions over his burial and her own marriage, she defied him a third time by selling his beloved home, the Priory, which he had inherited from his cousin Sir Herbert Price, to an unrelated family called Jeffreys from Llywel. The Flowers, who acquired the titles Viscount Ashbrook and Baron Castle Durrow, held on to Abercynrig, which had passed from Dorothea to her stepson, and it remained one of their principal estates until William Flower, 3rd Viscount Ashbrook sold it in 1800.

== Sources ==
- Arni, Eric von "Hospital Care and the British Standing Army 1660-1714" Routledge 2017
- Ball, F. Elrington "History of Dublin" Vol.6 University Press 1920
- Ball, F. Elrington The Judges in Ireland 1221-1921 London John Murray 1926
- Henning, B.D. editor The History of Parliament: the House of Commons 1660-1690 Boydell and Brewer 1983
- Jones, Theophilus "History of the County of Brecknock" William and George North 2 Volumes 1805-9
- Kenyon, J.P "The Popish Plot" Phoenix Press reissue 2000
- Lodge, John "Peerage of Ireland" Dublin 1754
- Marshall, George "Visitations of the County of Nottinghamshire 1559-1614" London 1871
- Siddons, Michael Powell (2002). The Visitation of Herefordshire, 1634. Publications of the Harleian Society, new series. Vol. 15. London: Harleian Society. pp. 102–103. ISBN 9780954044312. OCLC 50646822.
