= 1869 Brecon by-election =

UK parliamentary by-election

The 1869 Brecon by-election was fought on 24 April 1869. The by-election was fought due to the voiding of the election of the incumbent MP of the Conservative Party, Howel Gwyn. It was won by the Liberal candidate Edward Villiers.

1869 Brecon by-election
Party	Candidate	Votes	%	±%
Liberal	Edward Villiers	391	54.4	+5.4
Conservative	Claud Hamilton	328	45.6	−5.4
Majority		63	8.8	N/A
Turnout		719	88.3	−1.3
Registered electors		814		
Liberal gain from Conservative		Swing	+5.4	
