= 1870 Brecon by-election =

UK Parliamentary by-election

The 1870 Brecon by-election was fought on 13 June 1870. The by-election was fought due to the Succession to a peerage of the incumbent MP of the Liberal Party, Lord Hyde. It was won by the Conservative candidate James Gwynne-Holford.

1870 Brecon by-election
Party	Candidate	Votes	%	±%
Conservative	James Gwynne-Holford	372	52.4	+1.4
Liberal	Hugh Powell Price	338	47.6	−1.4
Majority		34	4.8	+2.7
Turnout		710	87.2	−2.4
Registered electors		814		
Conservative gain from Liberal		Swing	+1.4	
