= William Fuller-Maitland =

English art collector, politician, and cricketer

William Fuller-Maitland (6 May 1844 – 15 November 1932) was an English art collector and Liberal politician who sat in the House of Commons from 1875 to 1895. A cricketer, he played first-class cricket for Oxford University between 1864 and 1867, and for Marylebone Cricket Club (MCC) between 1866 and 1870.

== Early life ==
Fuller-Maitland was born at Stansted Hall, Essex, the eldest son of William Fuller Maitland, of Stansted, and of Garth, Brecon, and his wife Lydia Prescott. His father was an art collector and had rebuilt Stansted Hall to house his collection, but died before he could enjoy it. Fuller Maitland was educated at Brighton College and Harrow School where he was in the cricket XI for four years and at Christ Church, Oxford.

== Cricketing career ==
While at Oxford he played cricket for Oxford University where he was a devastating bowler. In 1864 he took 8 for 58 against MCC, 8 for 48 against Surrey and in the University match took four wickets in each innings for an Oxford victory. In 1865 he again took 4 wickets in each innings of the University match, and against Surrey took 6 for 100 and 6 for 35. He played the same matches in 1866 but his wicket tally was not so high. In 1867 he took 5 for 117 against Surrey. He subsequently played for Marylebone Cricket Club and for various other first-class sides including "Gentlemen" v Players, North of the Thames and I Zingari. Other teams he played for included South Wales, Bishops Stortford and Essex.

Fuller-Maitland was a right-arm slow bowler and took 123 first-class wickets at an average of 15.72 and with a best performance of 8 for 48. He was a right-hand batsman and played 62 innings in 38 first-class matches with an average of 13.85 and a top score of 61.

== Public offices ==
Fuller-Maitland was a J.P. and a Deputy Lieutenant of Breconshire, and a J.P. for Essex. He was elected as the Member of Parliament (MP) for Breconshire at a by-election in May 1875, and held the seat until his retirement from the House of Commons at the 1895 election.

== Private life ==
Fuller-Maitland sold Stansted Hall in 1921.

He died at Kemp Town, Brighton, Sussex at the age of 88. Fuller-Maitland had married the Hon. Evelyn Coulstoun Gardner, daughter of the 3rd Baron Gardner in 1881. His grandson Arthur Byng played cricket for Hampshire.

Parliament of the United Kingdom
Preceded by Godfrey Morgan	Member of Parliament for Breconshire; 1875–1895	Succeeded by Charles Morley
