= Sir Charles Morgan, 1st Baronet =

British judge and politician

Sir Charles Gould Morgan 1st Baronet
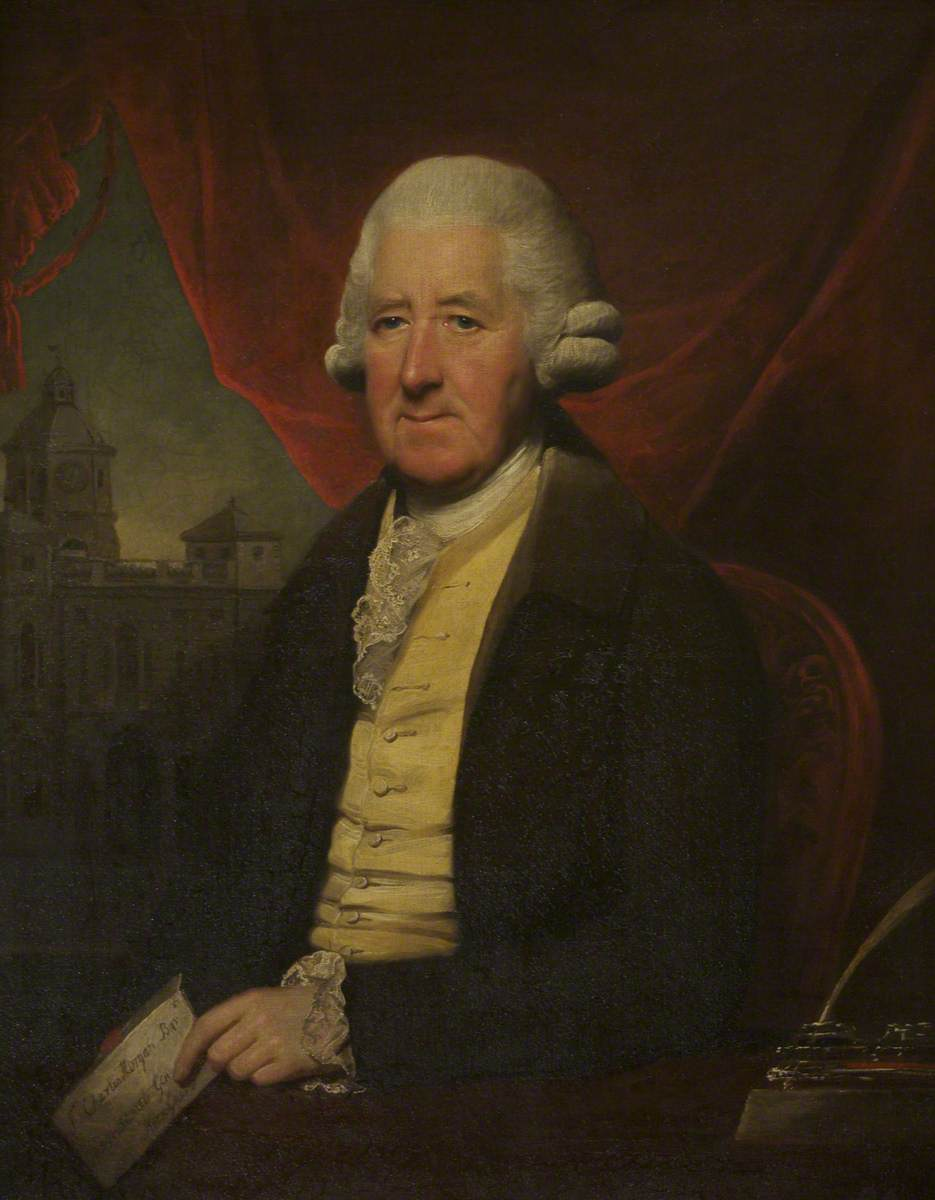
- Born: 25 April 1726
- Died: 7 December 1806 (aged 80)
- Spouse: Jane Morgan
- Children: Sir Charles Morgan, 2nd Baronet

Sir Charles Gould Morgan, 1st Baronet (25 April 1726 – 7 December 1806) was an English Judge Advocate-General. From his birth until 1792 he was known as Charles Gould.

== Life ==
The elder son of King Gould of Westminster, who died deputy judge advocate in 1756, he was a scholar of Westminster School in 1739. He was elected to Christ Church, Oxford, 1743, where he attained a B.A. in 1747 and a M.A. in 1750. He was made an honorary D.C.L. in 1773.

Gould was called to the bar at the Middle Temple in 1750, and in 1771 was appointed judge advocate-general. He came into the favour of George III, was made chancellor of Salisbury in 1772, and became chamberlain of Brecon, Radnor, and Glamorgan. He sat as Member of Parliament for Brecon 1778–87, and for the Breconshire 1787–1806. He was knighted on 5 May 1779, and made a baronet on 30 October 1792, That same year he changed surname to Morgan on inheriting the Rhiwperra and Tredegar estates from the Morgan family. In 1802 he was made a privy counsellor.

He was elected as a bailiff to the board of the Bedford Level Corporation in 1781, a position he held until his death.

Morgan died at Tredegar on 7 December 1806.

== Works ==
In 1751 Gould was one of the authors of the Oxford poem on the occasion of the death of Frederick, Prince of Wales.

== Family ==
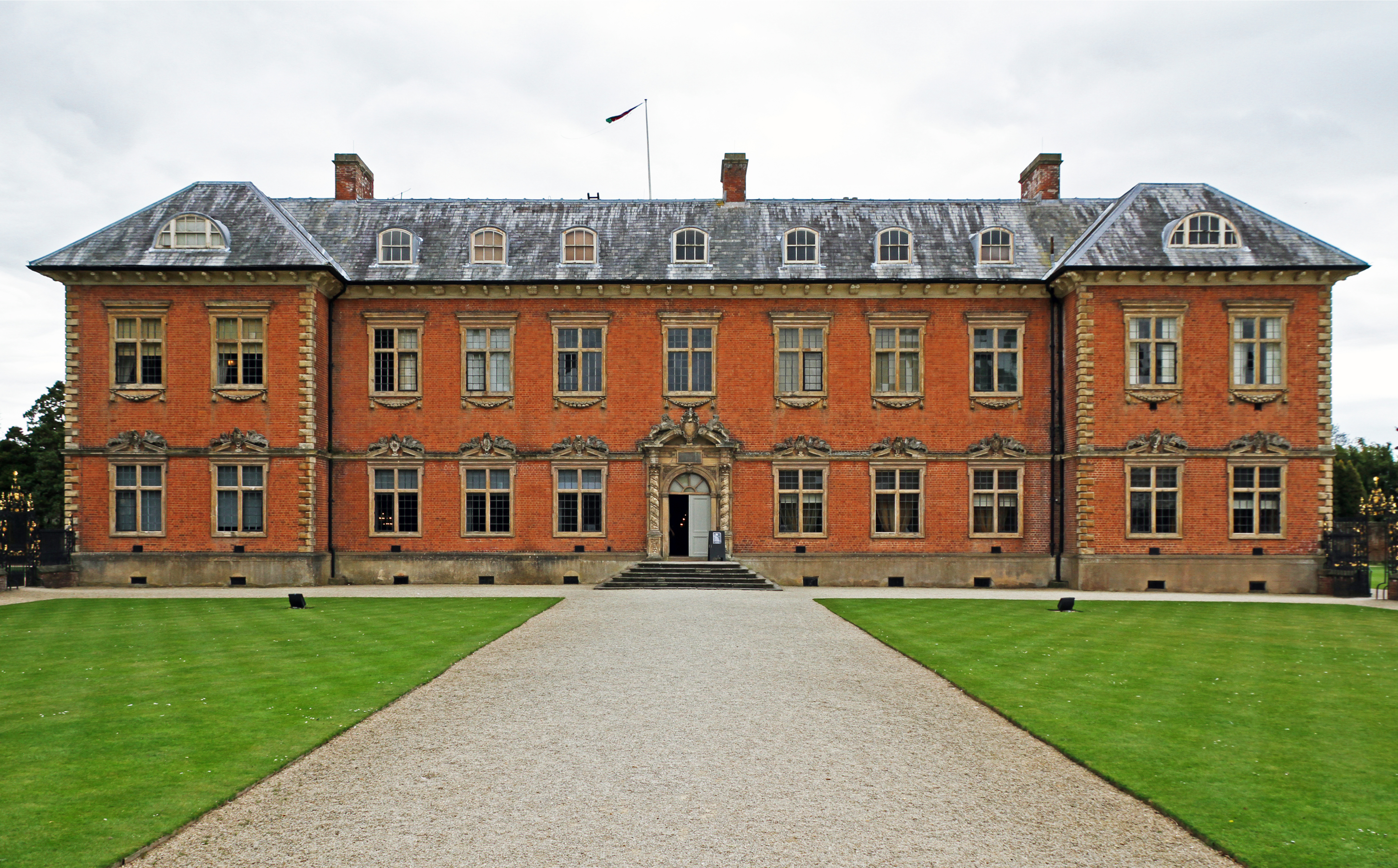
Tredegar House

In 1758 Gould married Jane, eldest daughter of Thomas Morgan. On the death of his wife's brother John Morgan without issue in 1792, he inherited the Tredegar Estate. He then took by royal licence the surname and arms of Morgan (20 November 1792). He was succeeded in his title and estates by his eldest son Charles. The other children were:

- John, a midshipman killed in action at the Battle of the Saintes, 1782.
- Jane (died 1846) who married (1) Captain Henry Ball R.N.(died 1792) and (2) industrialist Samuel Homfray. Homfray and his associates leased mineral land from Sir Charles in the Sirhowy Valley twenty-two miles north of Newport, where they established the Tredegar Ironworks and the associated town of Tredegar.
- Elizabeth (died 1836), who married Rowley Lascelles, second illegitimate son of General Francis Lascelles and Ann Catley; their son Charles Francis Rowley Lascelles fought at the Battle of Waterloo.
- Thomas, who died young.

== Notes ==
Attribution

This article incorporates text from a publication now in the public domain: Stephen, Leslie; Lee, Sidney, eds. (1890). "Gould, Charles". Dictionary of National Biography. Vol. 22. London: Smith, Elder & Co.

Parliament of Great Britain
Preceded by Charles Van	Member of Parliament for Brecon; 1778–1787	Succeeded by Charles Gould
Preceded by Charles Morgan	Member of Parliament for Breconshire; 1787–1806	Succeeded by Thomas Wood
Baronetage of Great Britain
New title	Baronet (of Tredegar); 1792–1806	Succeeded by Charles Gould Morgan
