= Breconshire (UK Parliament constituency) =

UK Parliament constituency (1801–1918)

- Former county constituency for the House of Commons

1542–1918
- Seats: one
- Replaced by: Brecon and Radnor

Breconshire or Brecknockshire was a constituency in Wales which returned one Member of Parliament (MP) to the House of Commons of the English Parliament, and later to the Parliament of Great Britain and of the United Kingdom, between 1542 and 1918. (Historically, the "-shire" suffix was often omitted, leading to potential confusion with the Brecon borough constituency, which existed until 1885.)

== History ==
Like the rest of Wales, Breconshire was given the right to representation by the Laws in Wales Acts 1535 and 1542, and first returned an MP to the Parliament of 1542. The constituency consisted of the historic county of Brecknockshire. (Although the county town, Brecon, was a borough which elected an MP in its own right, it was not excluded from the county constituency, and owning property within the borough could confer a vote at the county election.) The county elected one MP, who was chosen by the first past the post electoral system — when there was a contest at all, which was rare.

As in other county constituencies, the franchise until 1832 was defined by the Forty Shilling Freeholder Act, which gave the right to vote to every man who possessed freehold property within the county valued at £2 or more per year for the purposes of land tax; it was not necessary for the freeholder to occupy his land, nor even in later years to be resident in the county at all. At the time of the Great Reform Act in 1832, Breconshire had a population of approximately 47,800, but the rarity of contested elections makes it difficult to make a reliable estimate of the number qualified to vote; the greatest number ever recorded as voting before the Reform Act was 1,641 at the general election of 1818.

For centuries before 1832, Breconshire politics was dominated by the Morgan family of Tredegar, who were usually able to nominate the county's MP without opposition (as was also the case in Brecon borough). The changes introduced by the Reform Act did little to shake this hold, and a Morgan was still sitting unopposed in the 1860s. The Reform Act extended the county franchise slightly, allowing tenants-at-will, copyholders and leaseholders to vote, but Breconshire's electorate was still only 1,668 at the first post-Reform election, though it grew in the subsequent half-century.

Breconshire was always an almost entirely rural constituency, mountainous and offering poor resources for its agricultural population. The Industrial Revolution, however, brought coal-mining to the south of the county, and by the late 19th century this was much the most important economic activity and was probably the most important factor in its developing a political mind of its own. By the 1890s it had abandoned its loyalty to the (Conservative) Morgans, and like other industrial constituencies in Wales was a safe Liberal seat.

By the time of the 1911 census, the population of Breconshire was 63,036, and there were around 13,000 voters on the register around the outbreak of the First World War, a respectable size, but neighbouring Radnorshire with barely 6,000 voters was too small to survive. With effect from the 1918 general election, the two constituencies were merged, to form a new Brecon and Radnor constituency.

== Members of Parliament ==
MPs 1542-1640 — MPs 1640-1918 — Elections — References — Notes

=== MPs 1542–1640 ===
Parliament	Member
1545	John Games (or ap Morgan)
1547	Sir John Price
1553 (Mar)	Sir Roger Vaughan
1553 (Oct)	Sir Roger Vaughan
1554 (Apr)	Sir Roger Vaughan
1554 (Nov)	Rhys Vaughan
1558	Watkin (or Walter) Herbert
1559 (Jan)	Sir Roger Vaughan
1562 (Dec)	Rowland Vaughan, died and replaced 1566 by Matthew Arundell
1571	Sir Roger Vaughan
1572	Thomas Games
1584 (Nov)	Thomas Games
1586	Thomas Games
1588–1589	Sir Robert Knollys
1593	Sir Robert Knollys
1597 (Sep)	Sir Robert Knollys
1601 (Oct)	Sir Robert Knollys
1614	Sir Charles Vaughan
1621	Sir Henry Williams
1625	Sir Charles Vaughan
1626	John Price
1628	Henry Williams
1629–1640	No Parliaments summoned

Back to Members of Parliament

=== MPs 1640–1918 ===
Year	Member	Party
Apr 1640	William Morgan	Parliamentarian
Nov 1640	William Morgan	Parliamentarian
1650	Colonel Philip Jones	
1653	Breconshire was not separately represented in the Barebones Parliament	
Representation increased to two members, 1654
1654	Lord Herbert and Edmund Jones	
1656	Colonel Philip Jones and Evan Lewis	
Representation reverted to one member, 1659
Jan 1659	Edmund Jones	
May 1659	Colonel Philip Jones	
Apr 1660	Sir William Lewis	
Apr 1661	Sir Henry Williams	
Nov 1661	John Jeffreys	
1662	Edward Proger	
1679	Richard Williams	
1685	Edward Jones	
1690	Rowland Gwynne	Whig
1695	Edward Jones	Tory
1697	Sir Edward Williams	Tory
1698	Sir Rowland Gwynne	Whig
1702	John Jeffreys	Tory
1705	Sir Edward Williams	Tory
1721	William Gwyn Vaughan	
1734	John Jeffreys	
1747	Thomas Morgan	
1769	Charles Morgan	
1787	Sir Charles Gould (later Sir Charles Gould Morgan)	
1806	Thomas Wood	Tory
1834	Thomas Wood	Conservative
1847	Sir Joseph Bailey	Conservative
1858	Hon. Godfrey Morgan	Conservative
1875 by-election	William Fuller-Maitland	Liberal
1895	Charles Morley	Liberal
1906	Sidney Robinson	Liberal
1916	Sidney Robinson	Coalition Liberal
1918	Constituency abolished: see Brecon and Radnorshire	

Back to Members of Parliament

== Elections ==
Decades:	1840s; 1850s; 1860s; 1870s; 1880s; 1890s; 1900s; 1910s

=== Elections in the 1830s ===
General election 1830: Breconshire
Party	Candidate	Votes	%
Tory	Thomas Wood	Unopposed	
Registered electors		c. 2,000	
Tory hold			

General election 1831: Breconshire
Party	Candidate	Votes	%
Tory	Thomas Wood	282	67.1
Whig	John Lloyd Vaughan Watkins	138	32.9
Majority		144	34.2
Turnout		420	c. 21.0
Registered electors		c. 2,000	
Tory hold			

General election 1832: Breconshire
Party	Candidate	Votes	%
Tory	Thomas Wood	Unopposed	
Registered electors		1,668	
Tory hold			

General election 1835: Breconshire
Party	Candidate	Votes	%
Conservative	Thomas Wood	Unopposed	
Registered electors		1,897	
Conservative hold			

General election 1837: Breconshire
Party	Candidate	Votes	%
Conservative	Thomas Wood	1,222	68.2
Whig	James Price Gwynne-Holford	570	31.8
Majority		652	36.4
Turnout		1,792	78.1
Registered electors		2,295	
Conservative hold			

=== Elections in the 1840s ===
General election 1841: Breconshire
Party	Candidate	Votes	%	±%
Conservative	Thomas Wood	Unopposed		
Registered electors		2,830		
Conservative hold				

General election 1847: Breconshire
Party	Candidate	Votes	%	±%
Conservative	Joseph Bailey	Unopposed		
Registered electors		2,548		
Conservative hold				

=== Elections in the 1850s ===
General election 1852: Breconshire
Party	Candidate	Votes	%	±%
Conservative	Joseph Bailey	Unopposed		
Registered electors		2,779		
Conservative hold				

General election 1857: Breconshire
Party	Candidate	Votes	%	±%
Conservative	Joseph Bailey	Unopposed		
Registered electors		2,609		
Conservative hold				

Bailey's death caused a by-election.

By-election, 28 December 1858: Breconshire
Party	Candidate	Votes	%	±%
Conservative	Godfrey Morgan	Unopposed		
Conservative hold				

General election 1859: Breconshire
Party	Candidate	Votes	%	±%
Conservative	Godfrey Morgan	Unopposed		
Registered electors		2,688		
Conservative hold				

Back to Elections

=== Elections in the 1860s ===
General election 1865: Breconshire
Party	Candidate	Votes	%	±%
Conservative	Godfrey Morgan	Unopposed		
Registered electors		2,409		
Conservative hold				

General election 1868: Breconshire
Party	Candidate	Votes	%	±%
Conservative	Godfrey Morgan	Unopposed		
Registered electors		3,644		
Conservative hold				

Back to Elections

=== Elections in the 1870s ===
General election 1874: Breconshire
Party	Candidate	Votes	%	±%
Conservative	Godfrey Morgan	1,594	60.6	N/A
Liberal	William Fuller-Maitland	1,036	39.4	New
Majority		558	21.2	N/A
Turnout		2,630	73.6	N/A
Registered electors		3,574		
Conservative hold		Swing	N/A	

Morgan succeeded to the peerage, becoming Lord Tredegar.

By-election, 22 May 1875: Breconshire
Party	Candidate	Votes	%	±%
Liberal	William Fuller-Maitland	1,710	51.6	+12.2
Conservative	Howel Gwyn	1,607	48.4	−12.2
Majority		103	3.2	N/A
Turnout		3,317	77.9	+4.3
Registered electors		4,256		
Liberal gain from Conservative		Swing	+12.2	

Back to Elections

=== Elections in the 1880s ===
General election 1880: Breconshire
Party	Candidate	Votes	%	±%
Liberal	William Fuller-Maitland	1,810	53.9	+14.5
Conservative	Arthur John Morgan	1,550	46.1	−14.5
Majority		260	7.8	N/A
Turnout		3,360	80.1	+6.5
Registered electors		4,195		
Liberal gain from Conservative		Swing	+14.5	

General election 1885: Breconshire
Party	Candidate	Votes	%	±%
Liberal	William Fuller-Maitland	4,784	59.3	+5.4
Conservative	Arthur John Morgan	3,282	40.7	−5.4
Majority		1,502	18.6	+10.8
Turnout		8,066	84.7	+4.6
Registered electors		9,520		
Liberal hold		Swing	+5.4	

General election 1886: Breconshire
Party	Candidate	Votes	%	±%
Liberal	William Fuller-Maitland	Unopposed		
Liberal hold				

Back to Elections

=== Elections in the 1890s ===
General election 1892: Breconshire
Party	Candidate	Votes	%	±%
Liberal	William Fuller-Maitland	4,676	57.8	N/A
Conservative	Thomas Wood (soldier)	3,418	42.2	New
Majority		1,258	15.6	N/A
Turnout		8,094	76.7	N/A
Registered electors		10,551		
Liberal hold				

Morley

General election 1895: Breconshire
Party	Candidate	Votes	%	±%
Liberal	Charles Morley	4,594	55.9	−1.9
Conservative	Thomas Wood (soldier)	3,631	44.1	+1.9
Majority		963	11.8	−3.8
Turnout		8,225	75.8	−0.9
Registered electors		10,849		
Liberal hold		Swing	-1.9	

Back to Elections

=== Elections in the 1900s ===
General election 1900: Breconshire
Party	Candidate	Votes	%	±%
Liberal	Charles Morley	Unopposed		
Liberal hold				

Robinson

General election 1906: Breconshire
Party	Candidate	Votes	%	±%
Liberal	Sidney Robinson	5,776	62.3	N/A
Conservative	Robert Devereux	3,499	37.7	New
Majority		2,277	24.6	N/A
Turnout		9,275	75.8	N/A
Registered electors		12,235		
Liberal hold				

Back to Elections

=== Elections in the 1910s ===
General election January 1910: Breconshire
Party	Candidate	Votes	%	±%
Liberal	Sidney Robinson	6,335	62.1	−0.2
Conservative	Robert Devereux	3,865	37.9	+0.2
Majority		2,470	24.2	−0.4
Turnout		10,200	75.9	+0.1
Liberal hold		Swing	-0.2	

General election December 1910: Breconshire
Party	Candidate	Votes	%	±%
Liberal	Sidney Robinson	5,511	60.3	−1.8
Conservative	John Conway Lloyd	3,631	39.7	+1.8
Majority		1,880	20.6	−3.6
Turnout		9,142	68.1	−7.8
Liberal hold		Swing	-1.8	

Back to Elections

== Notes ==
- D Brunton & D H Pennington, Members of the Long Parliament (London: George Allen & Unwin, 1954)
- Cobbett's Parliamentary history of England, from the Norman Conquest in 1066 to the year 1803 (London: Thomas Hansard, 1808)
- The Constitutional Year Book for 1913 (London: National Union of Conservative and Unionist Associations, 1913)
- F W S Craig, British Parliamentary Election Results 1832-1885 (2nd edition, Aldershot: Parliamentary Research Services, 1989)
- Henry Pelling, Social Geography of British Elections 1885-1910 (London: Macmillan, 1967)
- J Holladay Philbin, Parliamentary Representation 1832 - England and Wales (New Haven: Yale University Press, 1965)
- Leigh Rayment's Historical List of MPs – Constituencies beginning with "B" (part 5)
