= Church of St Basil, Bassaleg =

Coordinates: 51.5783°N 3.0442°W

St Basil's Church, Bassaleg
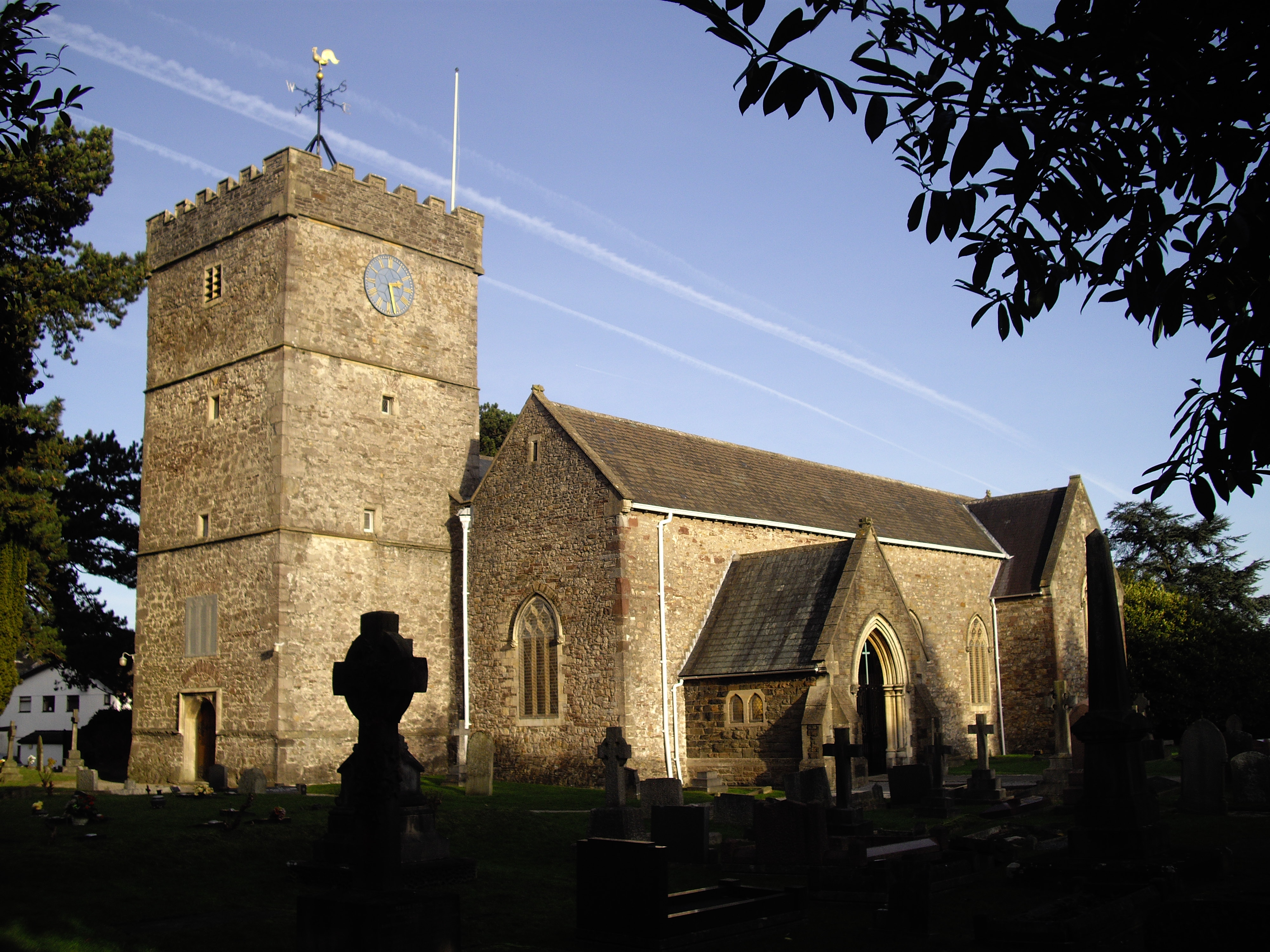

- Location in Newport
- OS grid reference: ST 277 871
- Location: Bassaleg, Newport
- Country: Wales
- Denomination: Church in Wales
- Website: St Basil, Bassaleg

History
- Status: Active

Architecture
- Functional status: Active
- Heritage designation: Grade II*
- Designated: 1 March 1963
- Architectural type: Church

Specifications
- Materials: Stone, slate roof

St Basil's Church stands in the village of Bassaleg, to the west of the city of Newport, Wales. It is an active parish church and a Grade II* listed building. St Basil's sits within the Tredegar Park Ministry Area which covers an area at the west of the city of Newport. It also hosts a community choir.

== History ==
Cadw dates the church to the 14th century, although it stands on the site of an earlier priory. The church was restored between 1878 and 1879 by Habershon and Fawckner and renovated in 1902–03 by Charles Busteed Fowler.

Since the very early 19th century a chapel within the church has been used as mausoleum for the Morgan family, prominent local landowners whose Tredegar House estate lies just to the south; this chapel was rebuilt in 1916 by W. D. Caröe for Courtenay Morgan. There is also a Morgan family burial plot in the church graveyard, which was renovated in the 21st century by the Lord Tredegar Memorial Trust.

A memorial in the churchyard commemorates Gwyneth Ericka Morgan (1895–c.1924), the daughter of Courtenay Morgan, who is also buried in the plot. Her disappearance in 1924, and the recovery of her body from the River Thames in 1925 was the subject of much speculation. Gwyneth was originally buried in London, but was re-interred at St Basil's after her brother, Evan Morgan, succeeded their father as head of the Morgan family in 1934. Gwyneth Morgan was the last member of the family to be buried at St Basil's, as her brother and subsequent heads of the family were catholics and buried elsewhere, the last dying in 1962.

== Architecture and description ==
St Basil's is constructed of stone with a slate roof. The church comprises a nave, chancel, porch, an "unusually large" west tower, and the Morgan family chapel to the northeast. The Royal Commission on the Ancient and Historical Monuments of Wales notes the "particularly fine" Morgan monuments dating from 1806 onwards. Works include memorials to Maria Morgan by Richard Westmacott, to Sir Charles Morgan, 1st Baronet by Coade & Sealy in their patented Coade stone, and to Sir Charles Morgan, 2nd Baronet by John Evan Thomas. The church also has stained glass by Kempe & Co. St Basil's is a Grade II* listed building. The lychgate has its own Grade II listing. (Note: Immediately to the left of the lychgate is the Tredegar Arms public house. This inn was the venue for an annual Balaclava dinner, hosted by Godfrey Morgan, 1st Viscount Tredegar, who participated in the Charge of the Light Brigade atop his horse, 'Sir Briggs'.) A church hall was constructed in the early 21st century.

== Gallery ==
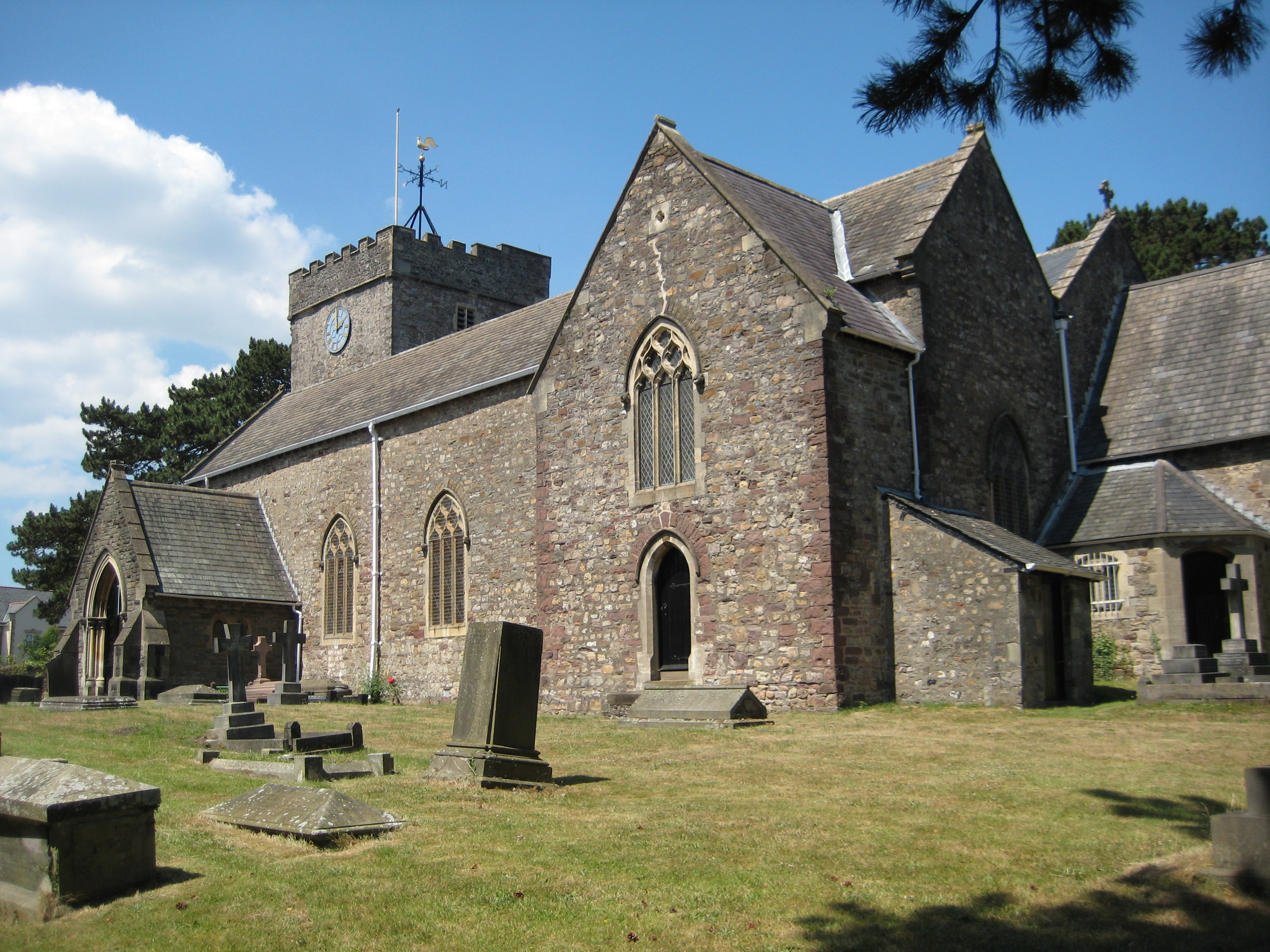
St Basil's from the south

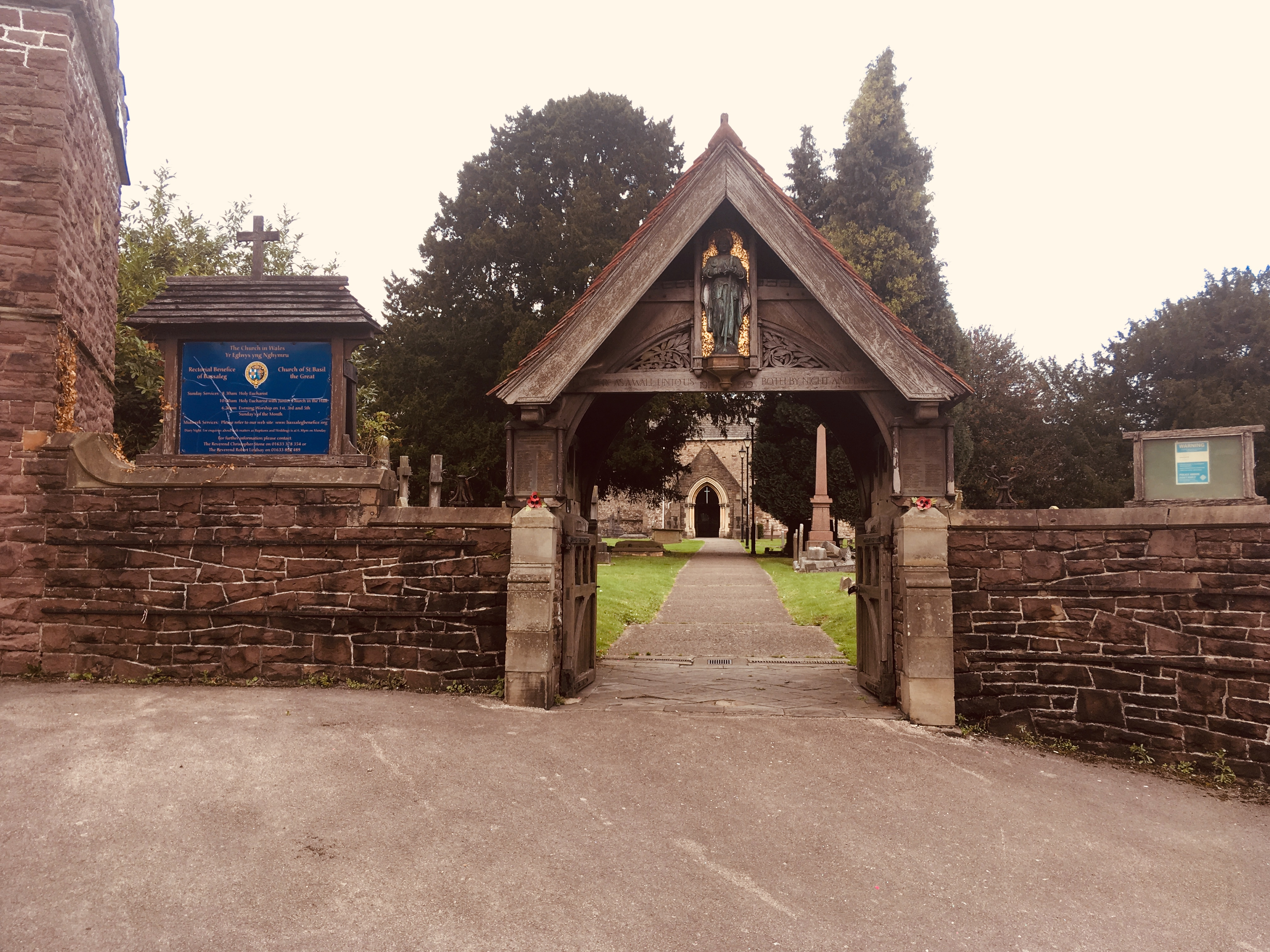
Lychgate

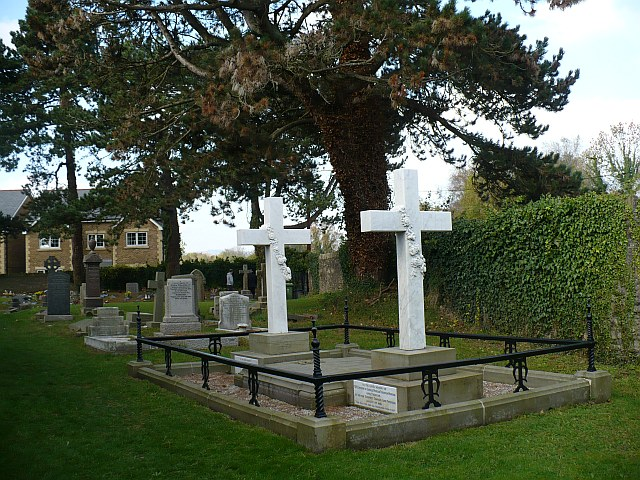
Morgan family burial plot

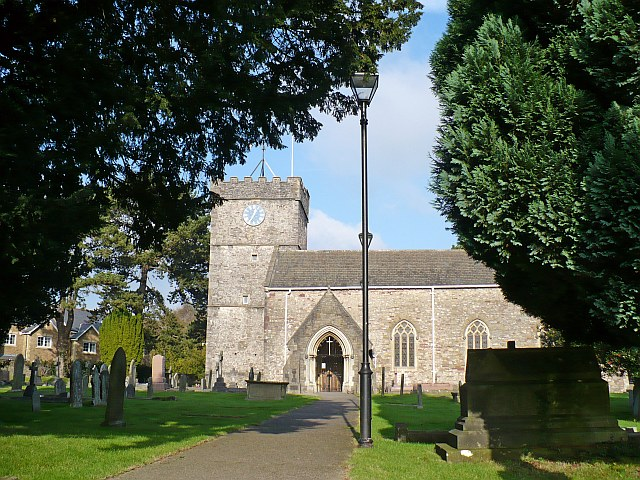
Church entrance
