= Godfrey Morgan, 1st Viscount Tredegar =

Welsh officer, a General in the British Army, and a peer

The Right Honourable The Viscount Tredegar
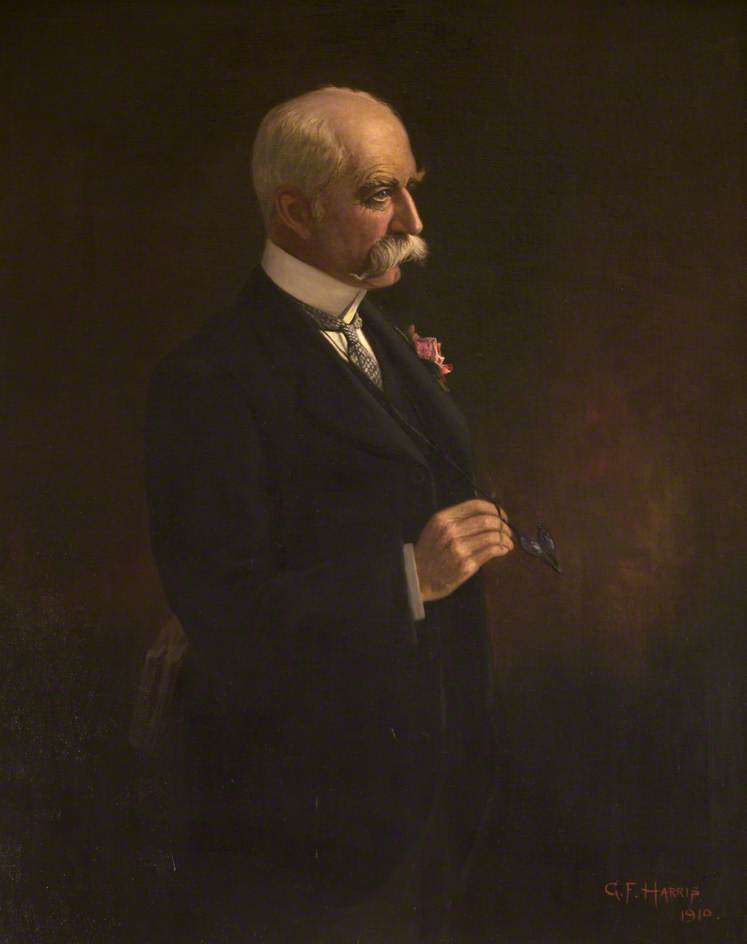
- Portrait of Lord Tredegar by George Frederick Harris, 1910

Member of Parliament for Breconshire
- In office 1858–1875
- Preceded by: Sir Joseph Bailey, Bt
- Succeeded by: William Fuller-Maitland

Personal details
- Born: Godfrey Charles Morgan; 28 April 1831
- Died: 11 March 1913 (aged 81)
- Parent(s): Charles Morgan, 1st Baron Tredegar; Rosamund Mundy
- Education: Eton College

Godfrey Charles Morgan, 1st Viscount Tredegar (28 April 1831 – 11 March 1913) was a Welsh officer, a General in the British Army, and a peer in the House of Lords.

== Early life ==
Tredegar was born on 28 April 1831 in Ruperra Castle, Glamorganshire, the son of Charles Morgan, 1st Baron Tredegar and his wife Rosamund Morgan (née Mundy), Baroness Tredegar. He was educated at Eton and joined the British Army in 1853.

== Career ==
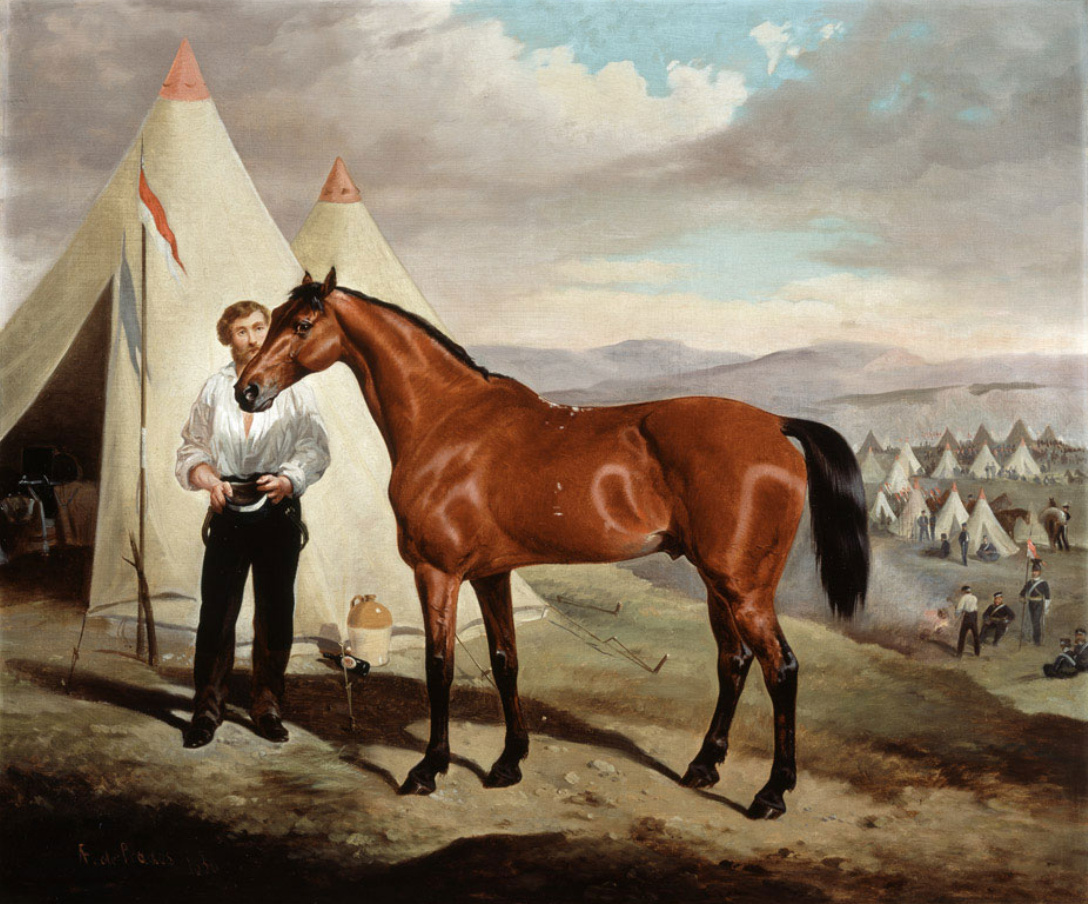
Painting of his horse, Sir Briggs, by Alfred Frank de Prades, 1854

When the Crimean War broke out in 1854, Tredegar, aged 22, held the rank of captain in the 17th Lancers and accompanied his famous regiment to the scene of the great struggle. He was in action at the Battle of Alma and later on 25 October 1854 was in command of a section of the Light Brigade that rode into the 'Valley of Death' at the Battle of Balaclava, which he survived. Godfrey's horse, 'Sir Briggs', also survived, and lived at Tredegar's home, Tredegar House, Newport, Wales, until his death at the age of 28. He was buried in the Cedar Garden at Tredegar House (though not with full military honours as is frequently believed). The Monument to Sir Briggs still stands there today.

In later years, as other members of the Morgan family had been in the past, he became a benefactor to the people of Newport. Large tracts of land were donated to the Newport Corporation for the benefit of the public, including Belle Vue Park, the Royal Gwent Hospital and Newport Athletics Grounds. This earned him the nickname of "Godfrey the Good" among local people. He served as High Sheriff of Monmouthshire for 1858. Tredegar succeeded his father as 2nd Baron Tredegar in 1875.

=== Later life ===
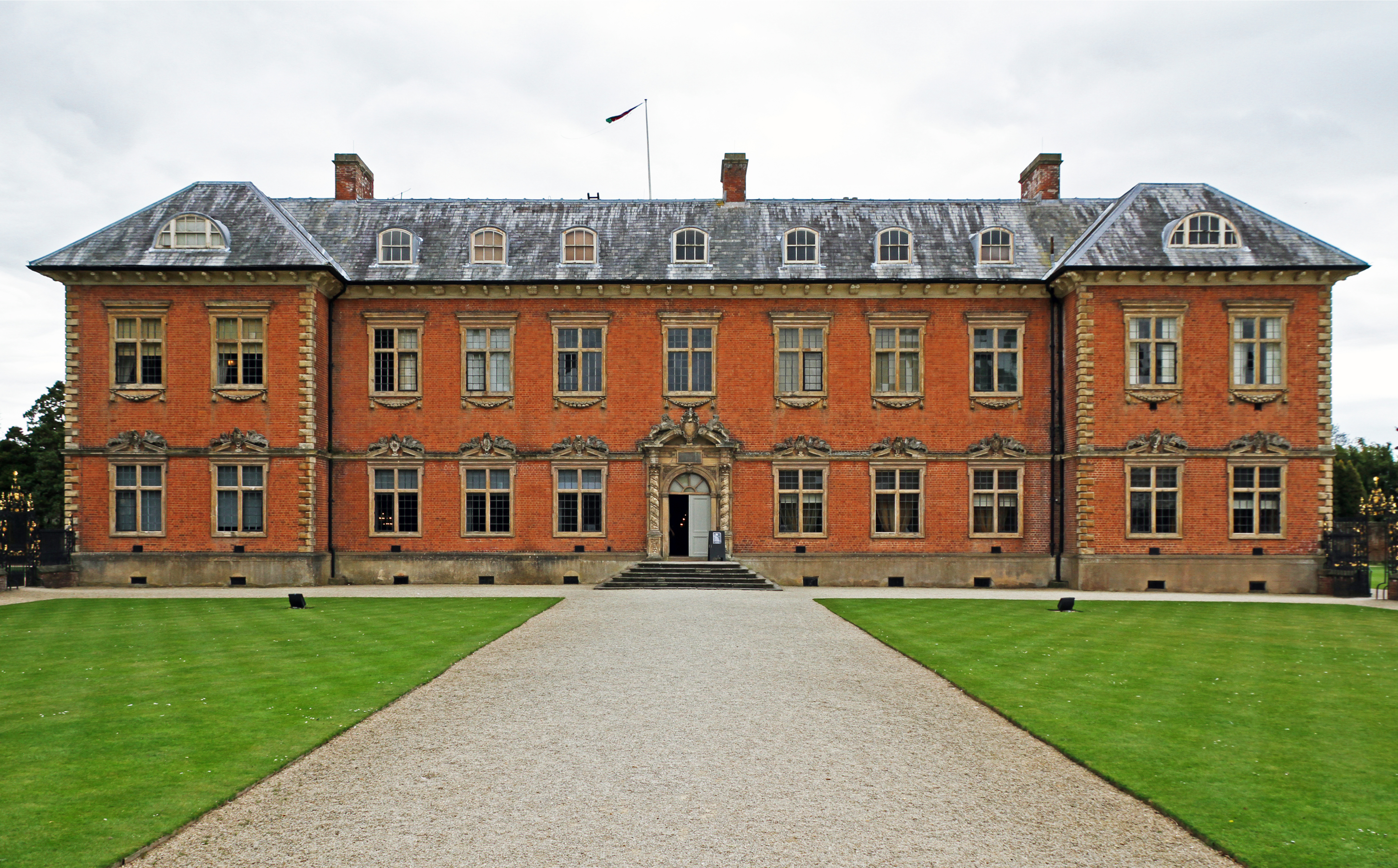
Tredegar House

In May 1902 he bought the lordships of the manor of Newport and Caerleon from the Duke of Beaufort, including the right to appoint a member of the Newport Harbour Commission.

He was created Viscount Tredegar, of Tredegar in the County of Monmouth on 28 December 1905, and became the first Freeman of Newport in 1909.

In addition to his Newport and Monmouthshire lands, Tredegar was a major landowner in the east of Cardiff and was the freeholder responsible for developing houses in Roath and Penylan, and the parks at Waterloo Gardens, Roath Mill Gardens and Roath Brook Gardens. He was awarded the Freedom of the City of Cardiff on 25 October 1909.

== Personal life ==
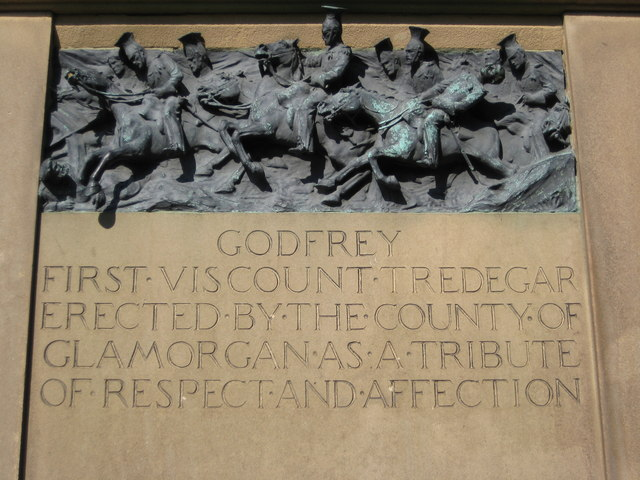
Inscription to Godfrey Morgan, the 1st Viscount Tredegar

Tredegar died on 11 March 1913 aged 81 and is buried at St Basil's Church, Bassaleg. He never married and on his death the viscountcy became extinct and his barony and baronetcy and the Tredegar estate passed to his nephew Courtenay Morgan, who spent little time in Wales.

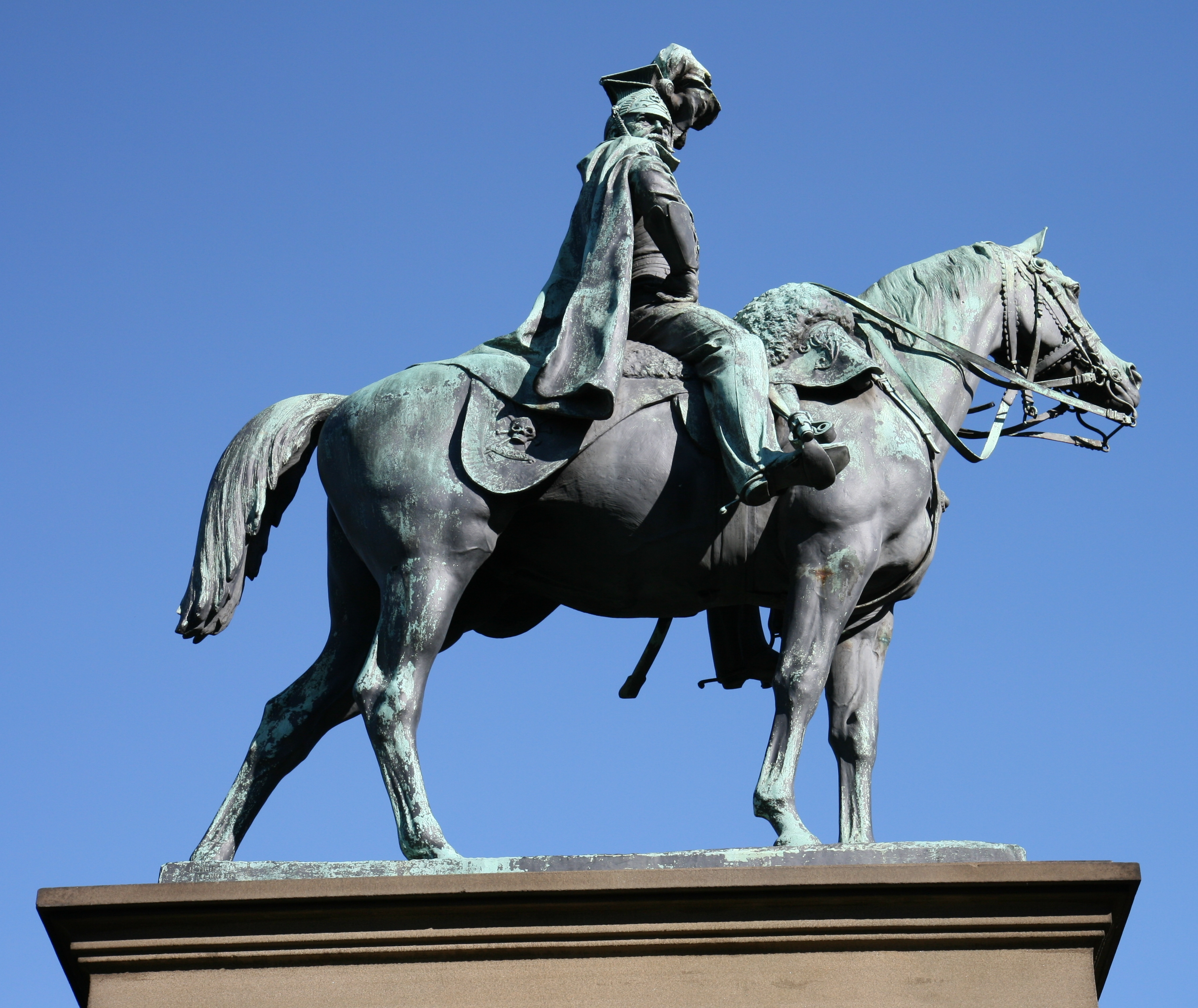
Sculpture in Cardiff by Sir William Goscombe John

A statue of Viscount Tredegar riding Sir Briggs was unveiled in 1909 in Gorsedd Gardens, Cathays Park, Cardiff. The sculptor was Sir William Goscombe John.

Parliament of the United Kingdom
Preceded by Sir Joseph Bailey, Bt	Member of Parliament for Breconshire; 1858–1875	Succeeded by William Fuller-Maitland
Honorary titles
Preceded by The Duke of Beaufort	Lord Lieutenant of Monmouthshire; 1899–1913	Succeeded by Sir Ivor Herbert, Bt
Peerage of the United Kingdom
New creation	Viscount Tredegar; 1905–1913	Extinct (revived 1926)
Preceded by Charles Morgan	Baron Tredegar; 1875–1913	Succeeded by Courtenay Morgan
