= Monument to Sir Briggs =

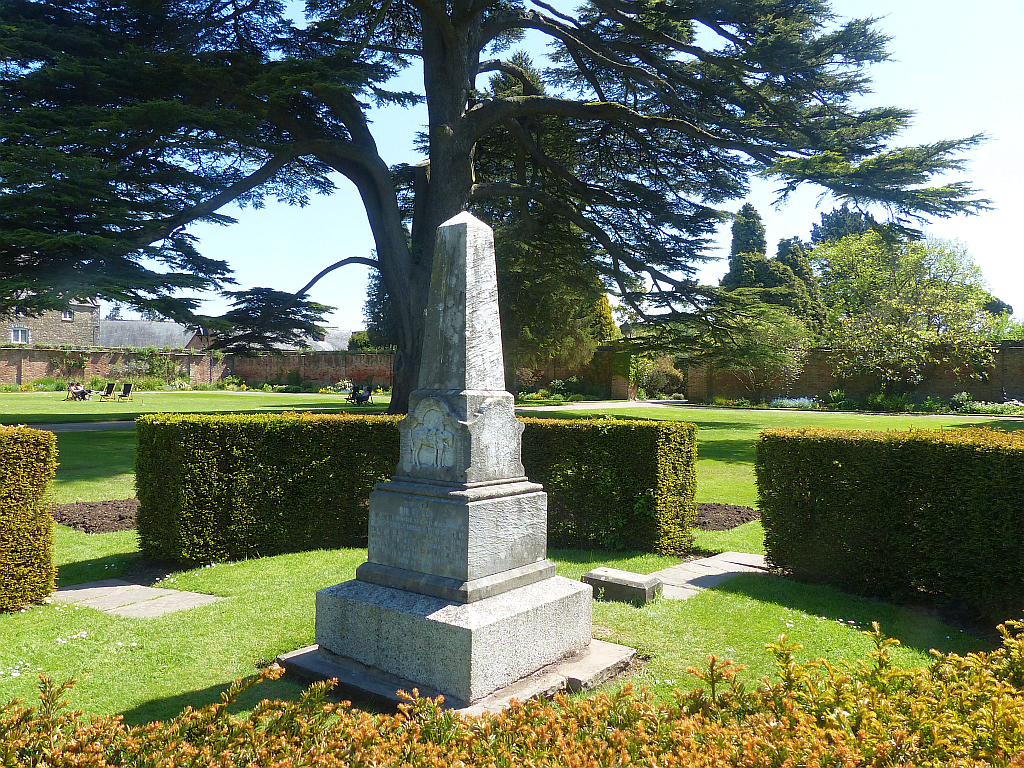

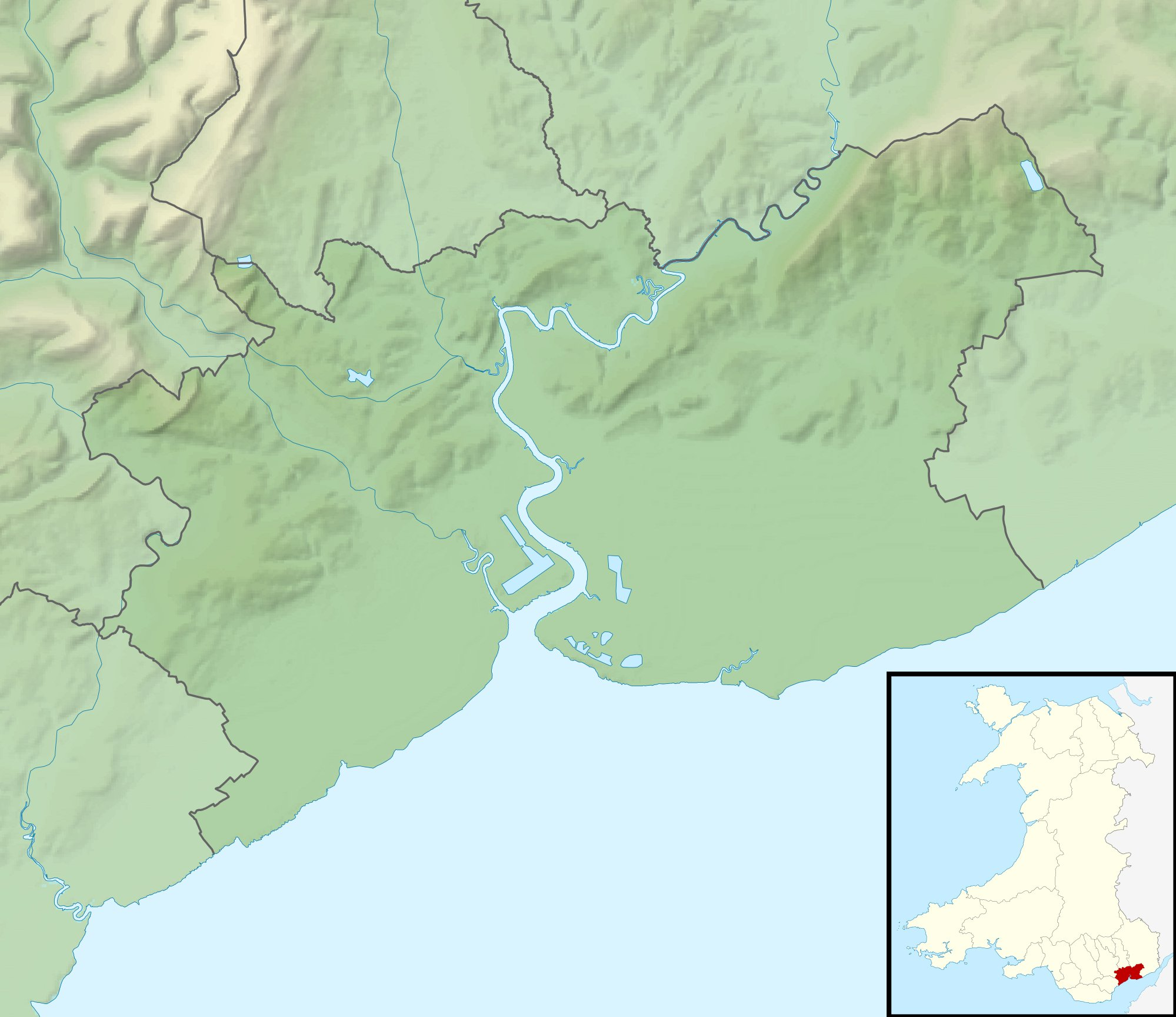
- Location within Newport
- 51.561°N 3.029°W
- Type: Memorial
- Location: Tredegar House, Newport, Wales

History
- Built: c.1874

Site notes
- Governing body: National Trust

Listed Building – Grade II
- Official name: Monument to Sir Briggs
- Designated: 31 July 1996
- Reference no.: 17099

The Monument to Sir Briggs is a memorial, dating from c.1874, to "Sir Briggs", a horse that carried Captain Godfrey Morgan at the Charge of the Light Brigade. It stands in the grounds of Tredegar House, Morgan's ancestral home, on the western edge of the city of Newport, Wales. It is a Grade II listed structure.

== History and description ==
IN MEMORY OF
SIR BRIGGS
A FAVOURITE CHARGER; HE CARRIED HIS MASTER
THE HON GODFREY MORGAN, CAPTAIN 17TH LANCERS
BOLDLY AND WELL AT THE BATTLE OF ALMA,
IN THE FIRST LINE OF THE LIGHT CAVALRY CHARGE OF
BALACLAVA AND AT THE BATTLE OF INKERMAN, 1854.
HE DIED AT TREDEGAR PARK FEBRUARY 9TH 1874
AGED 28 YEARS.

— Memorial inscription

Sir Briggs was a bay horse bought as a racehorse by Charles Morgan, 1st Baron Tredegar in 1851. Originally named Briggs, after a family servant, he competed successfully in race meetings across South Wales. In 1853, Charles' second son, Godfrey, aged 22, sailed for the Crimea at the start of hostilities between Russia, and Britain and France. He was accompanied by Briggs, part of a personal contingent of four horses. The other three horses died during transit. Godfrey Morgan, then a captain in the 17th Lancers, rode Briggs at the battles of Alma and Inkerman and most famously at the Charge of the Light Brigade during the Battle of Balaclava.

The horse was wounded during the battle, receiving a sabre cut to the eye. (Note: 375 horses of the Light Brigade were killed in the action, with a further 42, including Sir Briggs, being injured.) In recognition, Morgan dubbed him, 'Sir Briggs'. Morgan resigned his commission after the Battle of Inkerman and returned to England, leaving Sir Briggs in the care of his brother, Frederick. Sir Briggs went on to win the Military Steeplechase at Balaclava, before being returned to Wales.

After a twenty-year retirement, Sir Briggs died, aged 28, in 1874. The horse was buried in the Cedar Garden at Tredegar House, and Morgan raised a monument over the grave. An obelisk of granite, with a sculptural carving showing Morgan standing by Sir Briggs, it carries an inscription, [see box], and is surrounded by a circular yew hedge.

=== Depictions in art ===
Sir Briggs was painted by Alfred Frank de Prades in the Crimea in 1854. (Note: The de Prades portrait was donated by John Morgan, 6th Baron Tredegar to the National Army Museum in 1961 and is held in their study collection.) A later depiction, of 1905 by John Charlton, depicts Sir Briggs and Morgan in the midst of the Charge of the Light Brigade and is held at Tredegar House. An equestrian statue of Sir Briggs and Morgan, by Goscombe John and sculpted in 1909, stands in Cathays Park in Cardiff. In 2024, a model of Sir Briggs in willow, decorated with 4000 poppies, was unveiled at Tredegar House to commemorate the 170th anniversary of the battle.

== Gallery ==
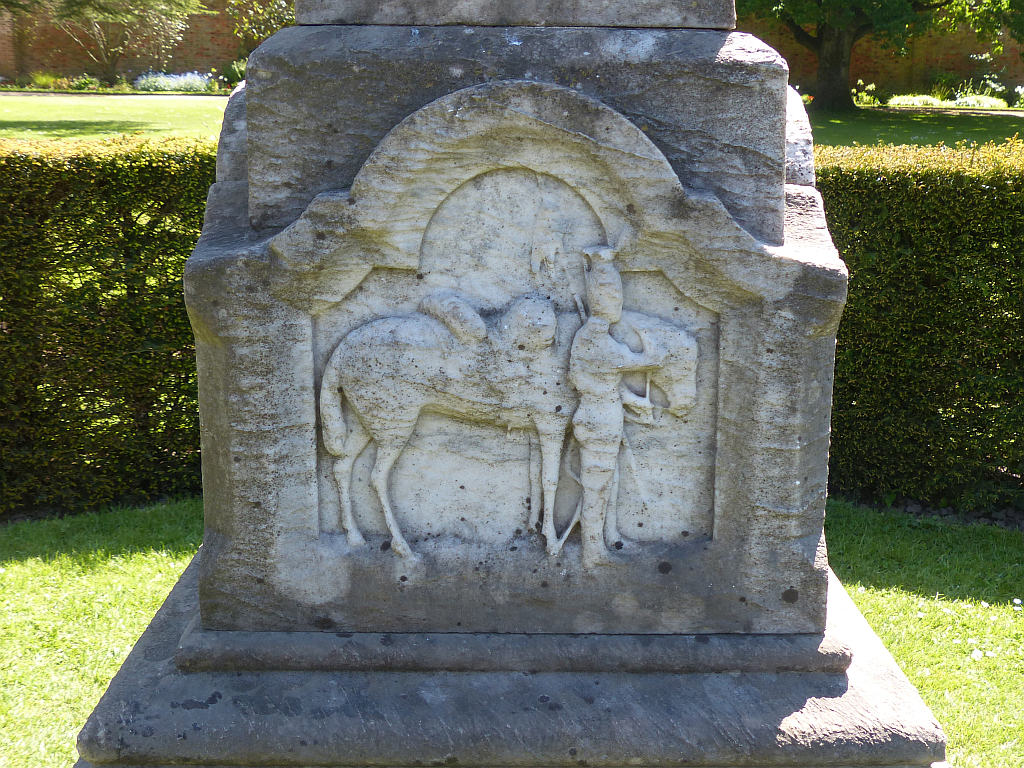
Detail of the monument

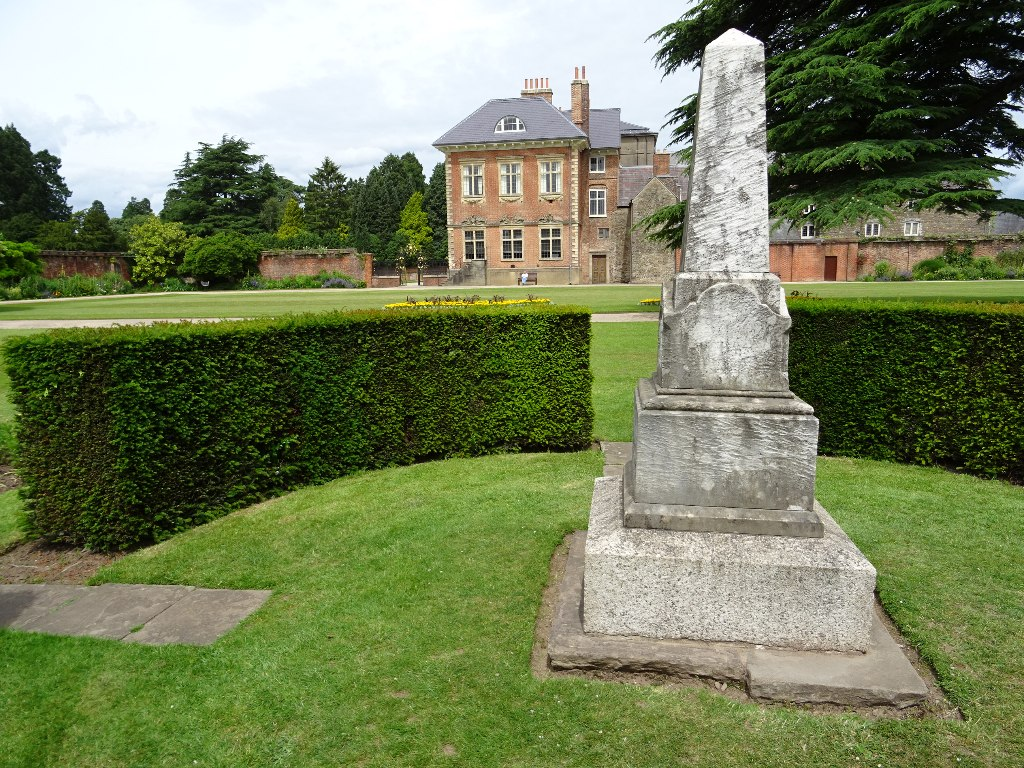
The monument in the Cedar Garden

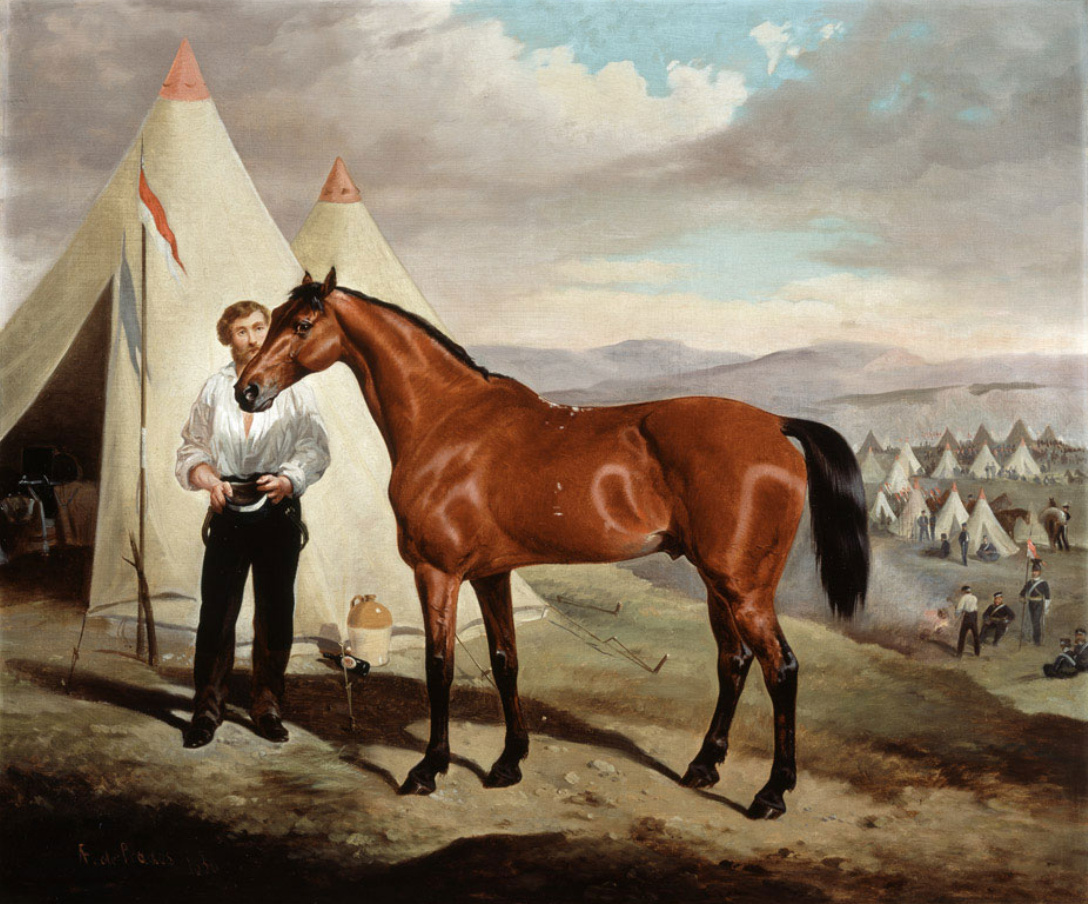
Sir Briggs by Alfred Frank de Prades

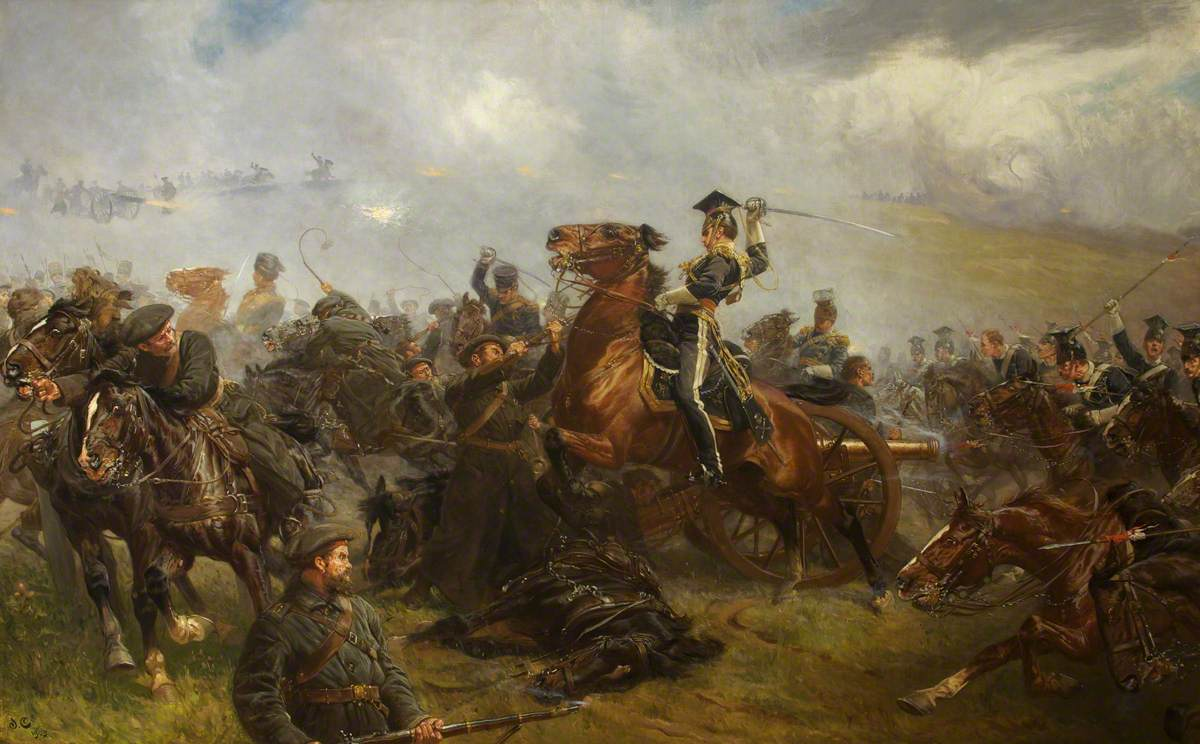
Painting of Sir Briggs carrying Captain Godfrey Morgan at the Charge of the Light Brigade, by John Charlton

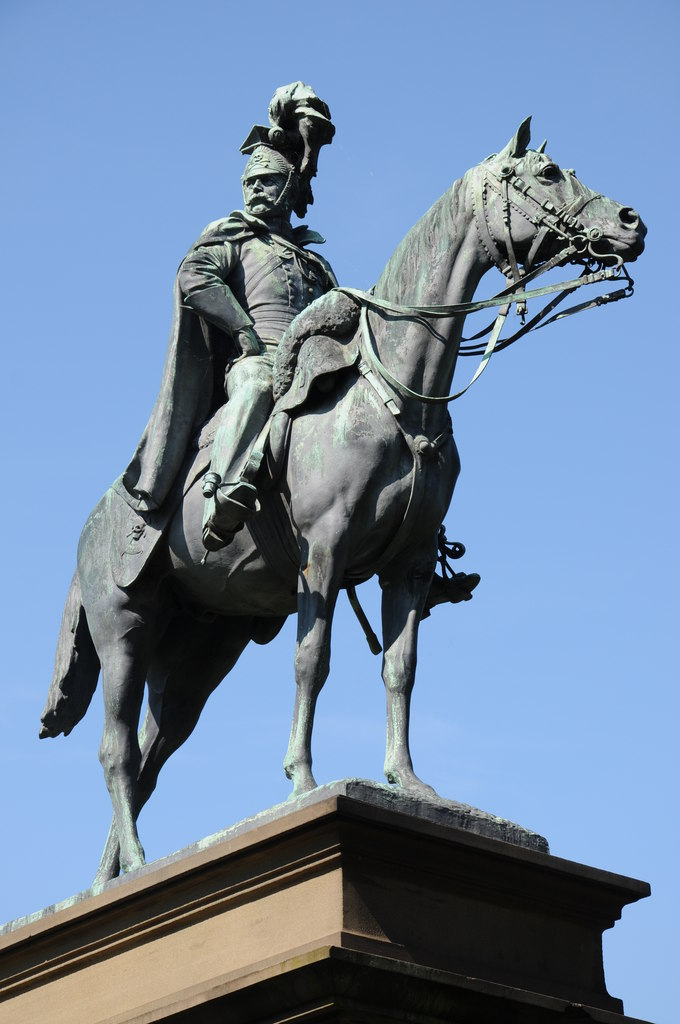
Statue of Sir Briggs, with Viscount Tredegar, by Goscombe John
