= Tredegar House =

17th-century house in Newport, Wales

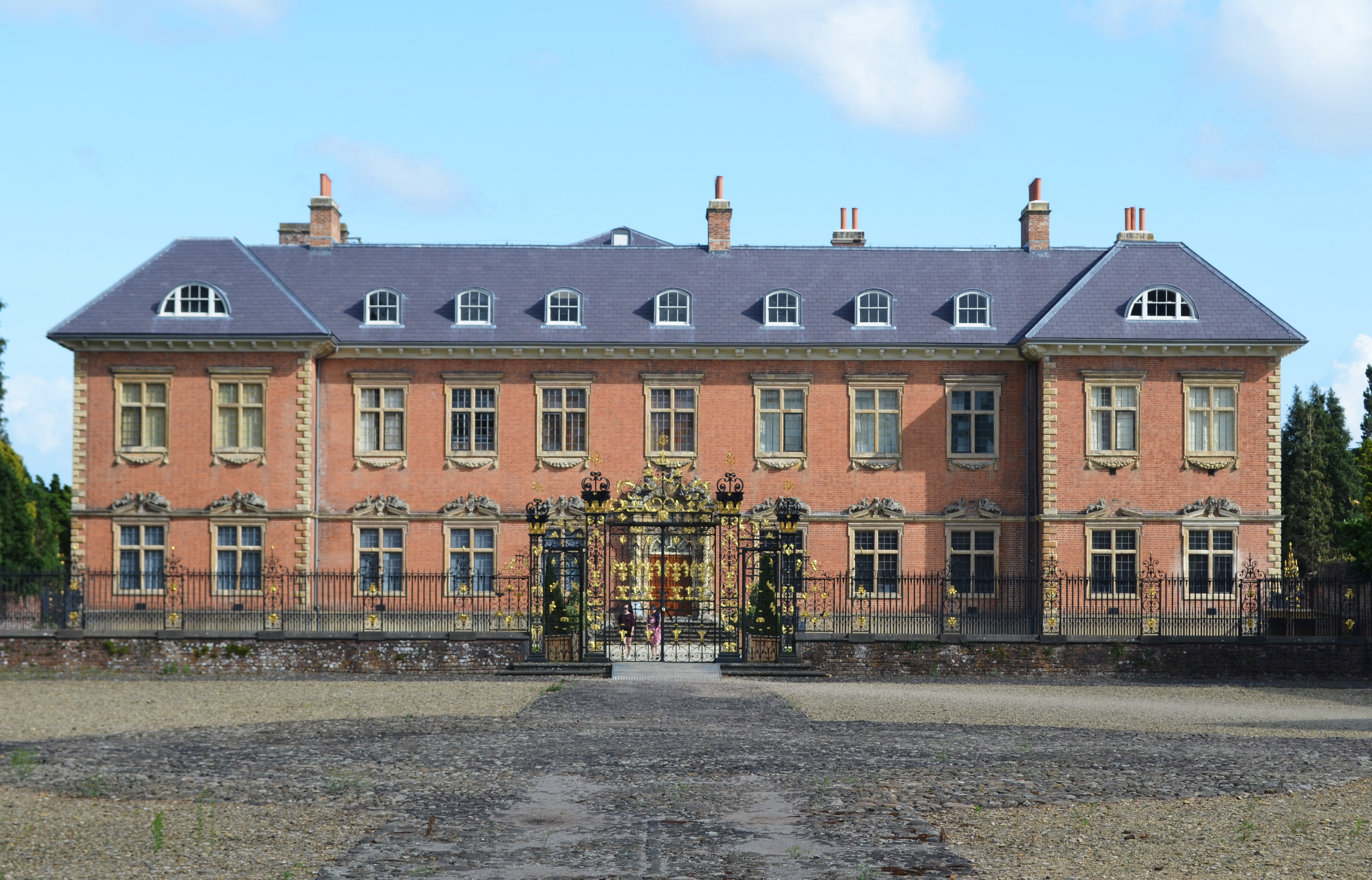
- "The most splendid brick house of the 17th century in Wales."

- Location within Newport

General information
- Type: Country house and gardens (32 hectares)
- Architectural style: Carolean
- Location: Newport, Monmouthshire, Wales
- Coordinates: 51°33′41.66″N 3°1′45″W
- Construction started: 1664
- Completed: 1672
- Client: William Morgan (of Machen and Tredegar)
- Operator: National Trust

Website
- National Trust: Tredegar House

Listed Building – Grade I
- Official name: Tredegar House
- Designated: 3 March 1952; 74 years ago
- Reference no.: 2902

Cadw/ICOMOS Register of Parks and Gardens of Special Historic Interest in Wales
- Official name: Tredegar Park
- Designated: 1 February 2022; 4 years ago
- Reference no.: PGW(Gt)48(NPT)
- Listing: Grade II*

Tredegar House (Welsh: Tŷ Tredegar) is a 17th-century Charles II-era country house in Coedkernew, on the southwestern edge of Newport, Wales. For over five hundred years it was home to the Morgan family, later Lords Tredegar, one of the most powerful and influential families in the area. Described as "the grandest and most exuberant country house in Monmouthshire" and one of the "outstanding houses of the Restoration period in the whole of Britain", the mansion stands in a reduced landscaped garden of 90 acres (0.36 km^{2}). The property became a Grade I listed building on 3 March 1952 and has been under the care of the National Trust since March 2012. The park surrounding the house is designated Grade II* on the Cadw/ICOMOS Register of Parks and Gardens of Special Historic Interest in Wales.

== Etymology ==
The name is first attested in the fourteenth century in the form Tredegyr. This may be explained as a compound of Welsh tre(f) 'a farmstead' and the personal name Tegyr (the same name is found in the Denbighshire name Botegyr < bod 'dwelling place, residence' + Tegyr). The name Tegyr itself may be derived from the Brittonic *Teco-rīx ('fair king').

The form Tredeger is found in the sixteenth century as are variants with -a- in the final syllable. Over time, the form Tredegar established itself as the usual spelling, as in the name of the Tredegar Iron Company of 1800. It was this that gave its name to the village and later town of Tredegar.

The current Welsh name of the house is 'Tŷ Tredegar', but this is somewhat unauthentic and is obviously a translation of 'Tredegar House'.

== Architecture ==
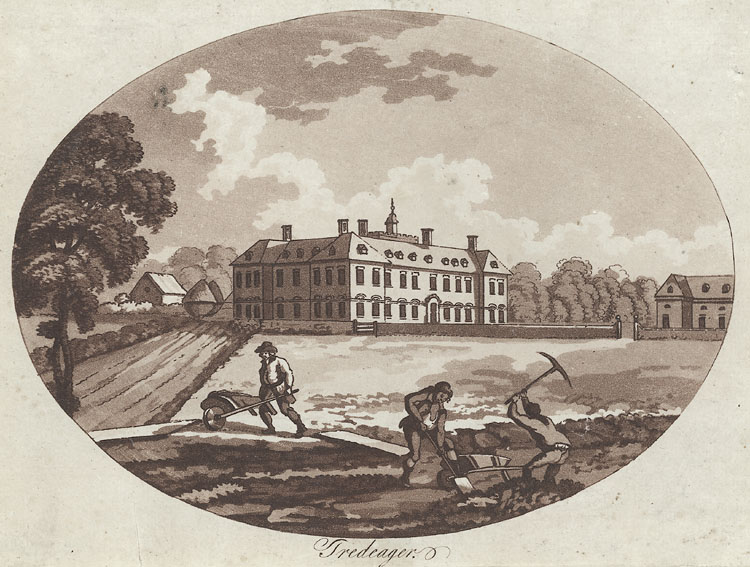
Workmen on the grounds of Tredegar House, 1795

The earliest surviving part of the building dates back to the late 15th century. The house was originally built of stone and had sufficient status to host Charles I. Between 1664 and 1672, however, William Morgan decided to rebuild the house on a larger scale from red brick, at that time a rare building material in Wales. The architect of the enlarged house is not known for certain, but John Newman follows Howard Colvin's suggestion that the design was by Roger and William Hurlbutt, who had worked in a similar style at Ragley Hall and Warwick Castle. The architectural historian Peter Smith, writing in his work Houses of the Welsh Countryside, called Tredegar, "the most splendid brick house of the seventeenth century in Wales". In his 1882 publication, local historian, and brother of the first Lord Tredegar, Octavius Morgan, provides a plan of an intricate garden maze which was in place prior to the 1660s improvements and which probably dated from the time of Queen Elizabeth I.

== The Morgans of Tredegar (1402–1951) ==
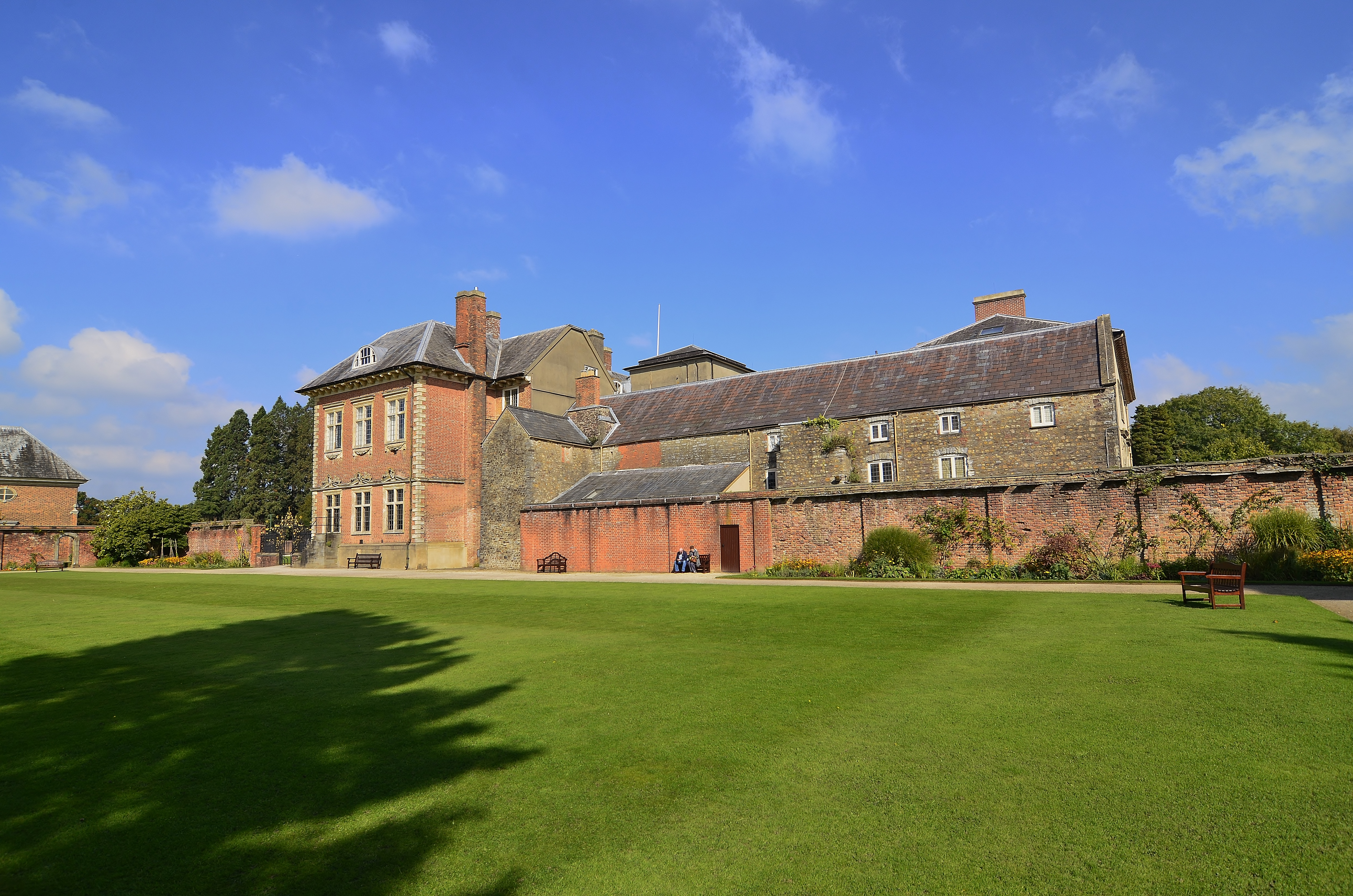
A view of the remaining wing of Sir John Morgan's Tudor Manor House (right) from the Cedar Garden.

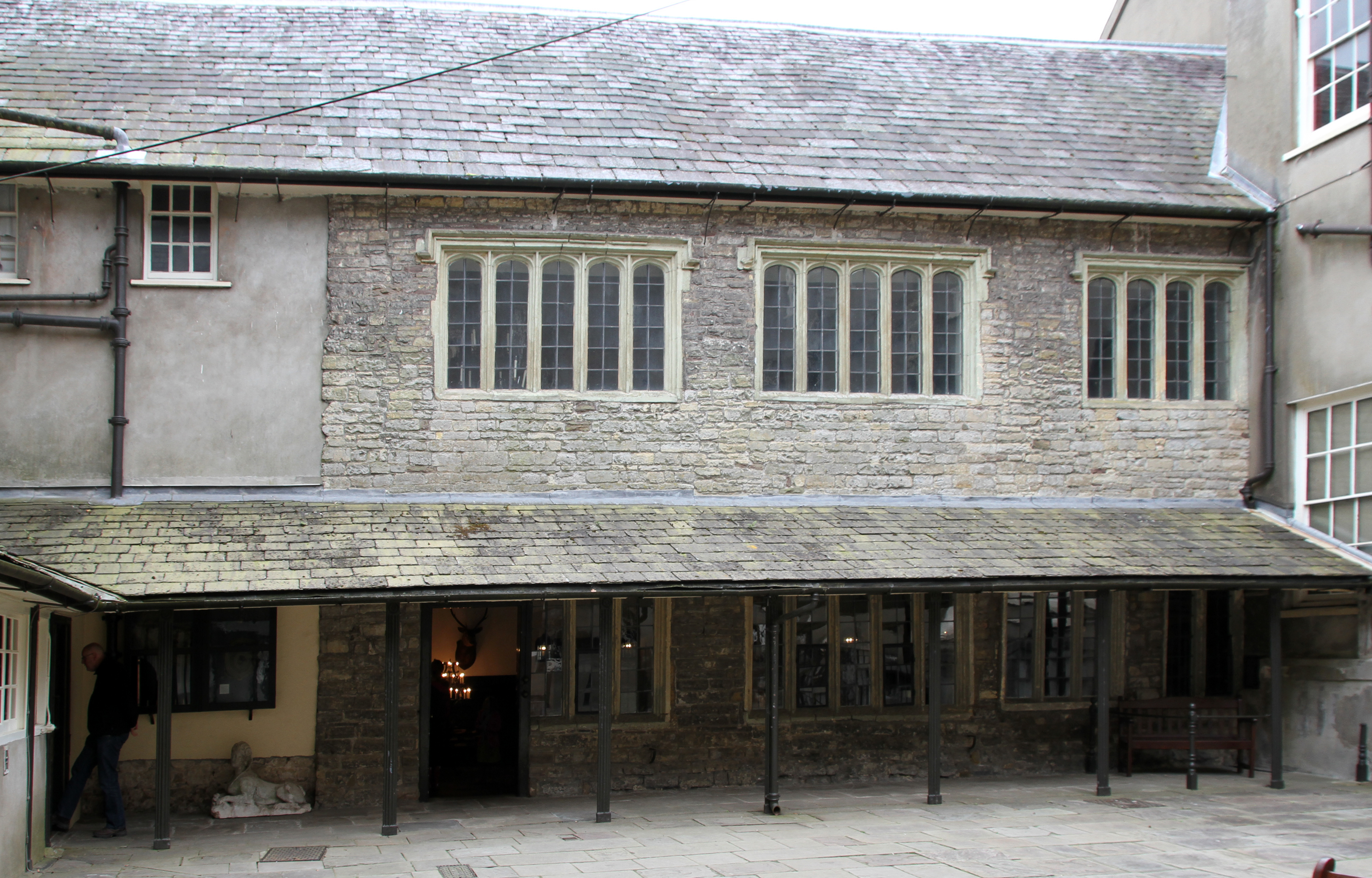
A view of the inward-facing side of the Tudor wing from the courtyard.

Tredegar's name came from Tredegar Fawr, the name of the mansion or seat of the old Morgans, who were descended from Cadifor the Great the son of Collwyn, and holders of the land upon which Tredegar stands. The earliest record of someone with the name Morgan living at Tredegar is 1402: a Llewellyn Ap Morgan. Tredegar House, set in 90 acres which remains landscaped for ornamental purposes, with less agriculture than in previous centuries, is the finest Restoration house in Wales and for over five hundred years the estate (including Ruperra Castle) was home to the Morgan family, later Lords Tredegar. John Morgan was created a Knight of the Holy Sepulchre (possibly c.1448). Later, when Henry Tudor was crowned King Henry VII it was of great benefit to the Morgans of Tredegar who were supporters of Henry. Sir John received reward for his early support, and on 7 November 1485 he was appointed by the new king to the office of Sheriff of Wentloog and Newport and made Steward of the Machen Commote. His elevation to officer of the Tudor crown placed Sir John Morgan's influence and power at new heights. At around 1490, he commissioned the building of a new house at Tredegar. A wing of Sir John's stone manor house still exists. It is now the oldest part of the present day Tredegar House.

A cadet branch of the ‘Tredegar Morgans’, probably nephews of Sir Thomas Morgan, included three brothers, Thomas, Robert and Edward. Thomas became Major-General Sir Thomas Morgan, 1st Baronet (1604–79), served in the Parliamentarian forces during the English Civil War 1642–9, was made Governor of Gloucester in 1645, fought in Flanders, was wounded, and in 1661 retired to his estate at Kinnersley, Herefordshire. Recalled in 1665 to become Governor of Jersey, he died at St Helier in April 1679. Married on 10 September 1632, he had nine sons, of whom the eldest, Sir John Morgan followed in his father's profession. Robert Morgan, (born circa 1615) became a farmer in Llanrumney, and was father of Henry Morgan (born in Llanrumney Hall, and pursued a successful career in the Caribbean as a privateer). Edward Morgan became Colonel Edward Morgan (born circa 1616 – Colonel after 1665), a Royalist during the English Civil War 1642–49, and Captain General of the King's forces in South Wales. After the King's arrest and execution, he fled to the continent and married Anna Petronilla the daughter of Baron von Pöllnitz from Westphalia (Governor of Lippstadt, 20 miles (32 km) east of Dortmund in Germany). They had six children, two sons and four daughters (including Anna Petronilla and Johanna). He was appointed Lieutenant Governor of Jamaica 1664–65.

During the civil war and after the Battle of Naseby, Charles I visited Tredegar House in 1645. In 1661 William Morgan (d.1680) rebuilt the house on a very grand scale, with the help of the huge dowry of his wife, Blanche Morgan. Their fortunes continued to flourish down the generations, tremendously enhanced by the foresight and business enterprises of Sir Charles Morgan, 1st Baronet throughout the 18th century. Following his father's financial successes, his son Sir Charles Morgan, 2nd Baronet further expanded several commercial and industrial projects, and virtually established Newport as an important trade centre. Whilst consolidating their influence on the political and economic issues of the country, they secured a baronetcy in 1792, and a barony in 1859.

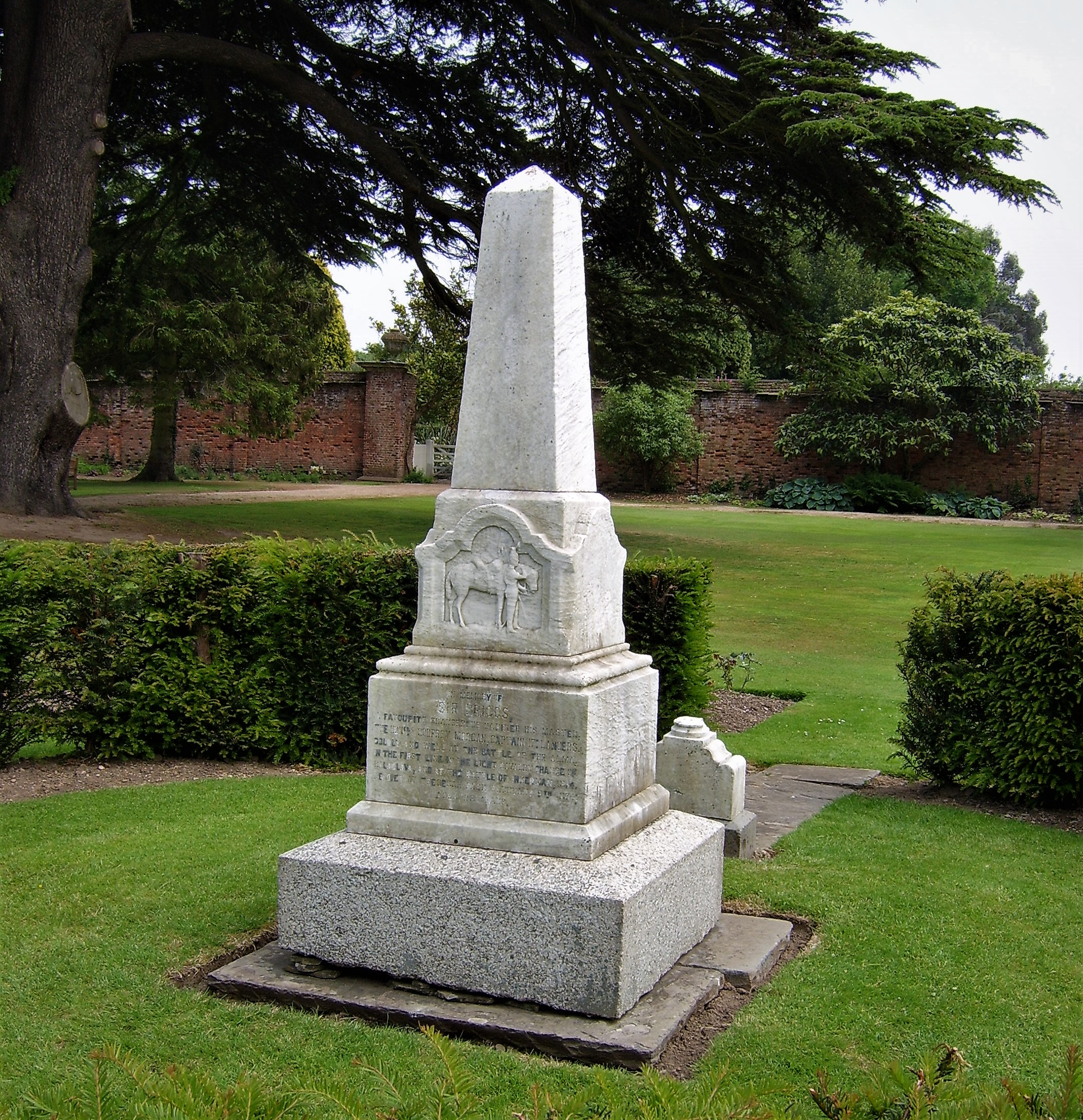
Monument to Sir Briggs in the Cedar Garden at Tredegar House

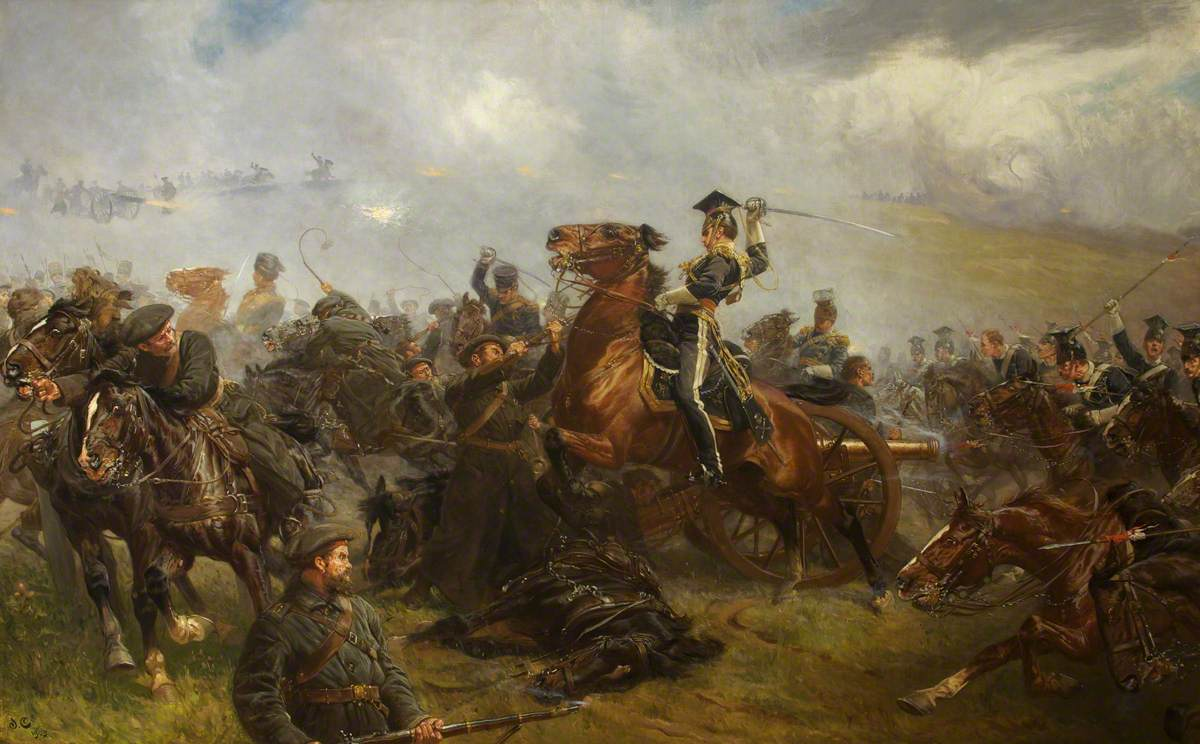
Godfrey Morgan riding Sir Briggs at the Charge of the Light Brigade, painted by John Charlton.

Godfrey Morgan, the second son of the first Baron Tredegar, served in the Crimean War as a captain in the 17th Lancers. He led men at the Charge of the Light Brigade on his horse, Sir Briggs, and was one of the few soldiers to survive the charge. When Sir Briggs died in 1874 aged 28, Godfrey had him buried in the Cedar Garden at Tredegar House, with a stone memorial erected above his grave. While serving in the Crimea, Godfrey's elder brother and heir to their father's title and estates, Charles Rodney Morgan, died in France aged 25, leaving no legitimate children. Subsequently, Godfrey became the new heir, succeeding his father as the second Baron Tredegar in 1875. As Lord Tredegar, Godfrey quickly became a much-loved benefactor of Monmouthshire, devoting his time as the head of the Morgan family to serving the county, donating land for hospitals, libraries, schools and parks. He was appointed Lord-Lieutenant of Monmouthshire in 1899, and was elevated to the rank of viscount in 1905. It was under Godfrey's tenure of Tredegar House that the Bath stone porch was added to the north-easterly wing, the Side Hall it opened onto was remodelled, and electricity was installed. Godfrey Morgan died in 1913, aged 81. As he died childless, his viscountcy became extinct. However, the barony and estates passed to his nephew, Courtenay Morgan, who became the third Baron Tredegar.

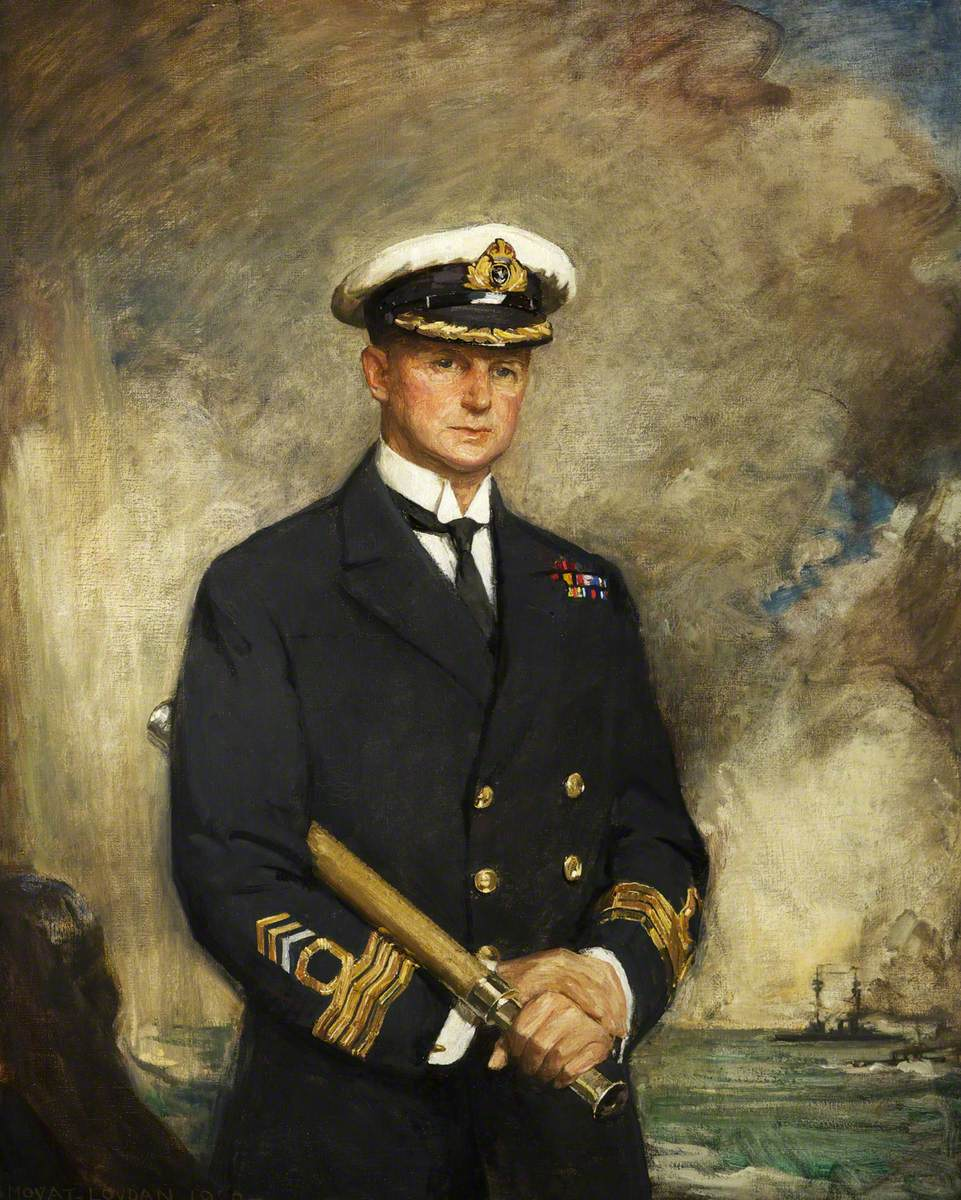
Courtenay Morgan in his RNVR uniform, painted in 1920.

Throughout his time as Lord Tredegar, Courtenay Morgan led an extravagant lifestyle, a contrast to his uncle and predecessor who lived a very modest life alone at Tredegar House. On succeeding to his uncle's estates, he bought Liberty, one of the largest steam-yachts in the world. Shortly after purchasing her, Liberty was requisitioned by the Royal Navy for use as a hospital ship during the First World War, and was voluntarily captained by Courtenay between 1914 and 1915 as lieutenant, and latterly as a temporary commander, in the Royal Naval Volunteer Reserve. When Liberty was returned to him following the war, he embarked on a world cruise, eventually circumnavigating the globe twice, visiting every colony in the British Empire and every state in the Commonwealth of Australia. In 1925, Courtenay became Naval aide-de-camp to George V, and was elevated to the rank of viscount in 1926. As a young man, his eyesight had begun to deteriorate, and by the late 1920s, he was completely blind. It was around this time that he built the stone staircase which extended from a window of the Gilt Room into the Cedar Garden at Tredegar House, enabling him to move more easily between the house and gardens. In 1933, Courtenay was appointed Lord-Lieutenant of Monmouthshire, however died the following year at The Ritz Hotel, aged 67. Courtenay was succeeded by his son from an otherwise unsuccessful marriage to Lady Katherine Carnegie, Evan Morgan, who became the second Viscount Tredegar.

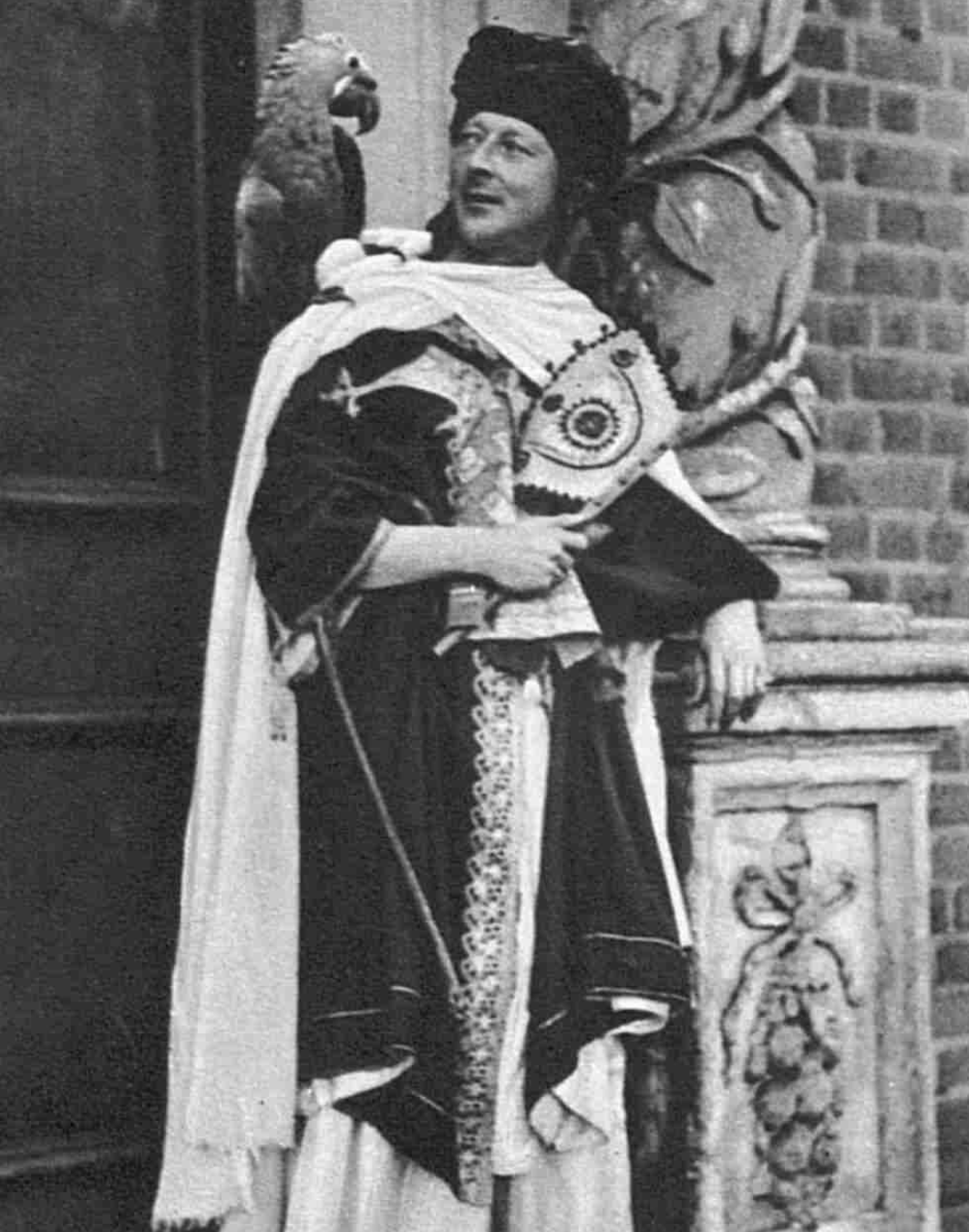
Evan Morgan, wearing Tunisian robes, with Blue Boy on his shoulder, outside Tredegar House in 1937.

The new viscount was an infamous eccentric and copious spender, who spent his youth as an amateur poet and painter, as well as a member of the Bright Young Things, a group of socialites from aristocratic families. In 1919, he converted to Roman Catholicism, and later became Papal Chamberlain to Popes Benedict XV and Pius XI. Despite his devout Catholicism, Evan also had a fascination with the occult, and had a "magik room" at Tredegar House, where he practised occult ritual. He also enjoyed friendship with Aleister Crowley, who was a frequent visitor to Tredegar House, hailed Evan as the "Adept of Adepts" with regard to his occult expertise, and described his magik room as "the best equipped [he had] ever seen." Guests at Evan's weekend house parties at Tredegar included a wide selection of society figures: among them, Aldous Huxley, H. G. Wells, G. K. Chesterton, and the Marchesa Casati. Evan also had a love for animals, birds in particular, and following his father's death amassed a menagerie at the family home, including bears, kangaroos, and birds, including Blue Boy, a formidable macaw. Alan Pryce-Jones, a friend of Evan's and frequent visitor to Tredegar, recalled in his autobiography, "When [Evan] called 'Rosa, Rosa' across the lake at Tredegar, Rosa, a duck, came skimming out of the reeds."

Although Evan was a known homosexual, he married twice, firstly in 1928 to his friend and fellow socialite, Lois Sturt. The marriage was one of convenience, providing cover for Evan's scandalous and illegal affairs, and Lois' own with the Earl of Pembroke. Lois died in 1937 aged just 37, by which point the couple had already been separated for some months. Evan married secondly in 1939 to Princess Olga Dolgorouky, an exiled Russian aristocrat who had fled Russia as a child following the 1917 Revolution. This union was another of convenience, and ended in annulment in 1943. By the late 1940s, Evan's extravagant spending had significantly depleted the family's finances, and his ever-fragile health was failing. Between 1946 and 1947, several meetings took place between Evan and the trustees of the Tredegar Estates. Evan suggested that parts of the estate could be sold to recover some of the lost capital, but this was blocked by his uncle and heir, Frederic. Another proposal was that Evan transfer part of the estate to Frederic's son, John, to reduce the burden of inheritance tax on his death, but this was rejected by Evan; he and John shared a mutual loathing of each other. Evan Morgan died in April 1949, aged 55, and – having converted to Catholicism – was buried at Buckfast Abbey. As he died childless, the viscountcy became extinct. However, the barony and estates passed to his uncle, Frederic, who became the fifth Baron Tredegar.

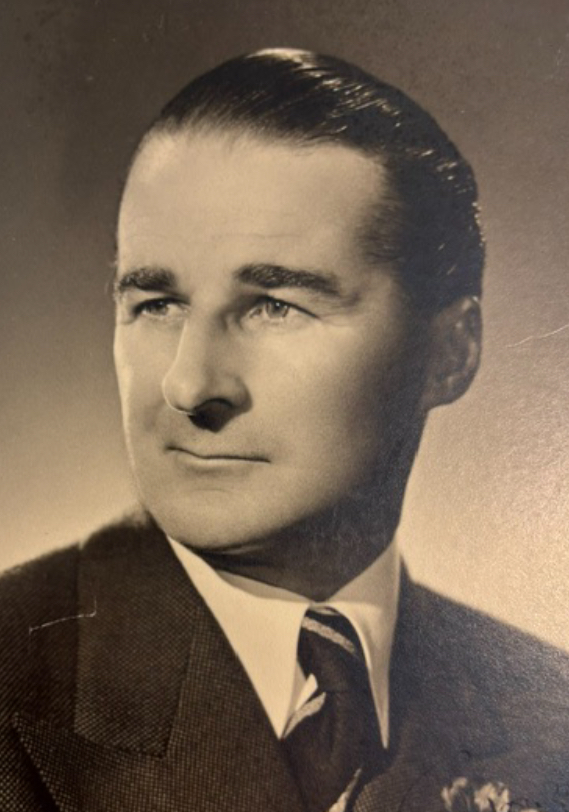
John Morgan, later the sixth and final Baron Tredegar, 1949.

Frederic was 75 years old, confessed to being "nearly crippled with osteoarthritis", and – with no agreement regarding estate planning having been reached prior to Evan's death – was now faced with a £1,000,000 inheritance tax bill on his nephew's estates. (Note: £1,000,000 in 1949 equates to approximately £30,553,000 in 2025, according to calculations based on the Consumer Price Index measure of inflation.) Concerned about his own mortality, Frederic had arranged prior to Evan's death for Tredegar House and the estates to immediately pass to his son, John, meaning they would not be liable to further tax on his own demise. Officially, Frederic renounced his inheritance in early May 1949, meaning John succeeded to a £1,150,000 tax-free fortune. (Note: £1,150,000 in 1949 equates to approximately £35,135,000 in 2025, according to calculations based on the Consumer Price Index measure of inflation.) In an interview at the time of his renunciation, Frederic stated that John was in Lourdes, where – being a Catholic convert – he was seeking religious guidance as for what to do with Tredegar House and the estates. On his return in late May, John Morgan made his first visit to Tredegar House since succeeding to the estates, and told the press that he was prepared to live there "on a very modest scale in view of the prevailing conditions." In the months following, John periodically stayed at Tredegar House for days at a time, although never made it his permanent residence. In August 1950, he announced "with great regret that death duties, taxation and rising costs" had made it necessary for him to close Tredegar House.

== Sale of the property ==
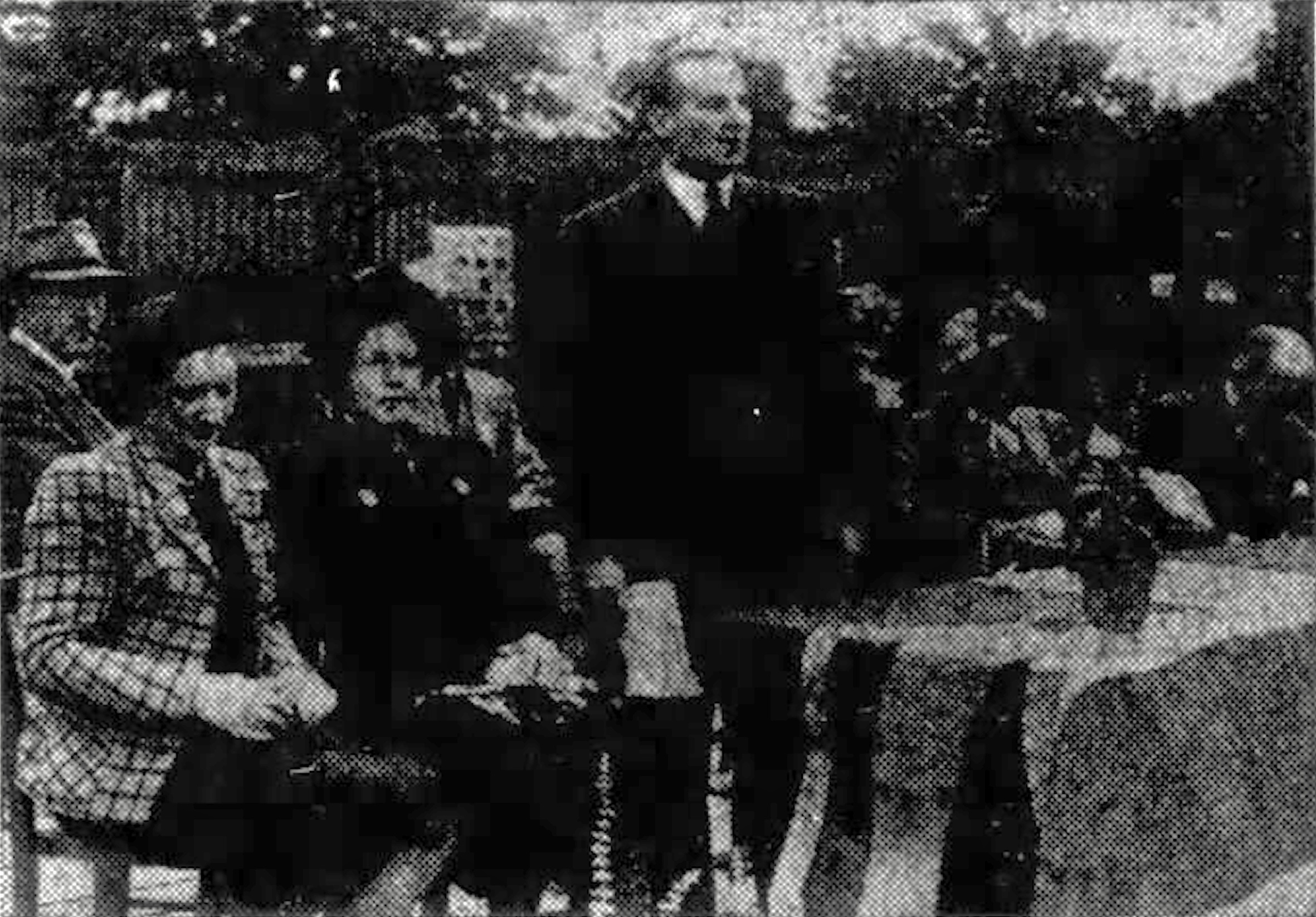
John Morgan speaking at a fete held in the grounds of Tredegar House in 1949.

During his brief tenure of Tredegar House, John Morgan was sparingly in residence, and never for more than a few days at a time. As Assistant Almoner and later a Brother of the Priory for Wales, he occasionally lent the grounds for events hosted by the Priory, as well as by the local Conservative Association, of which he was president. John, often accompanied by his sister, Avis, used Tredegar House itself for a small number of gatherings as well as to host individual guests, including Compton Mackenzie, a friend of Avis, for whom a luncheon was held in August 1950.

On John Morgan's succession to the estate, there was a possibility that Tredegar House may be given to the National Trust in lieu of death-duties which he was still due to pay. As such, James Lees-Milne, secretary of the Country Houses Committee of the National Trust, visited Tredegar House in November 1949 to assess the property on behalf of the trust. An account of his tour of the house, accompanied by John Morgan, is documented in his book of diaries, Midway on the Waves. He ultimately concluded that the house was "probably the best in Wales", and notes that he was particularly impressed by the French furnishings. However, he also writes, "I was a trifle disappointed by the coarse, unrefined quality of the craftsmanship", specifically citing, "the famous wainscot is very rough indeed." (Note: A fuller extract from Lees-Milne's diary reads; "I left early this morning for Newport, Monmouthshire. Was met at the station by John Morgan flying his personal flag on the radiator of his motor, and driven to Tredegar. He is absurdly pompous and puffed up with self-importance. Ridiculous as this may be he has a sense of duty, genuine, and his religion means everything to him. We spent the afternoon going round the house. Now it is important, and probably the best in Wales. Nevertheless I was a trifle disappointed by the coarse, unrefined quality of the craftsmanship. The red brick exterior is attractive, and so are the heraldic supporters of lion and unicorn in porous over the window pediments. It is a great pity that the cupola and roof balustrade of this Restoration house are missing. The iron railing put round the roof during the war to prevent fire-watchers falling off is unsightly. Some of the contents are superb, notably the French furniture and in particular the Adam bureau-cum-harpsichord all in one, with a clock in the pediment.") In late May 1950, the Chief District Valuer for Newport visited Tredegar House to assess it on behalf of the Inland Revenue. In a report following his visit, the valuer concluded "the main structure appears to be sound, but some repairs are required, principally to the ornamental stone work", continuing, "the roof timbers are affected by dry rot" and that "the ornamental gardens are somewhat neglected." The following month, he valued the property (house with contents, outbuildings, and the parkland) at £74,000. (Note: £74,000 in 1950 equates to approximately £2,190,000 in 2025, according to calculations based on the Consumer Price Index measure of inflation.) In late August 1950, the National Trust ended negotiations over Tredegar House, citing "the cost of carrying out the necessary work upon the property", by which time John Morgan had closed the house owing to the high cost of its upkeep.

In December 1950, it was revealed that Tredegar House was to be bought by the Catholic Church, and run as a convent school by the Sisters of St. Joseph. The property (minus the contents of the house) was sold for £40,000. (Note: £40,000 in 1950 equates to approximately £1,184,000 in 2025, according to calculations based on the Consumer Price Index measure of inflation.) As a Catholic convert, John Morgan asserted that the sale was "good for [his] bank balance and [his] soul." In January 1951, John Morgan allowed Iorwerth Peate, keeper-in-charge for St Fagans Castle, to choose thirty pieces of furniture from Tredegar House for exhibition in the period rooms of the castle, many of which remain in the collection of the St Fagans National Museum of History today. Permission was also granted for the National Library of Wales to select around 200 volumes from the library at Tredegar House for their collection; this was the library's "second selection of printed books, manuscripts and prints", which suggests that further volumes were selected at an earlier date. In July of the same year, Stephenson and Alexander, a local firm of auctioneers, disposed of the remaining of the contents of Tredegar House by auctions over two days. Following the removal of the contents from the house, the Sisters of St. Joseph gradually prepared the property for its new use, before it opened as St. Joseph's Convent School in September 1952. (Note: In his book, Tredegar: The History of an Agricultural Estate 1300–1956, Roger Phillips states that Major Harry Ware, land agent to both Evan and John Morgan, "... occupied a suite of rooms in the house until [the Sisters] took it over in 1951.")

== Subsequent ownership ==
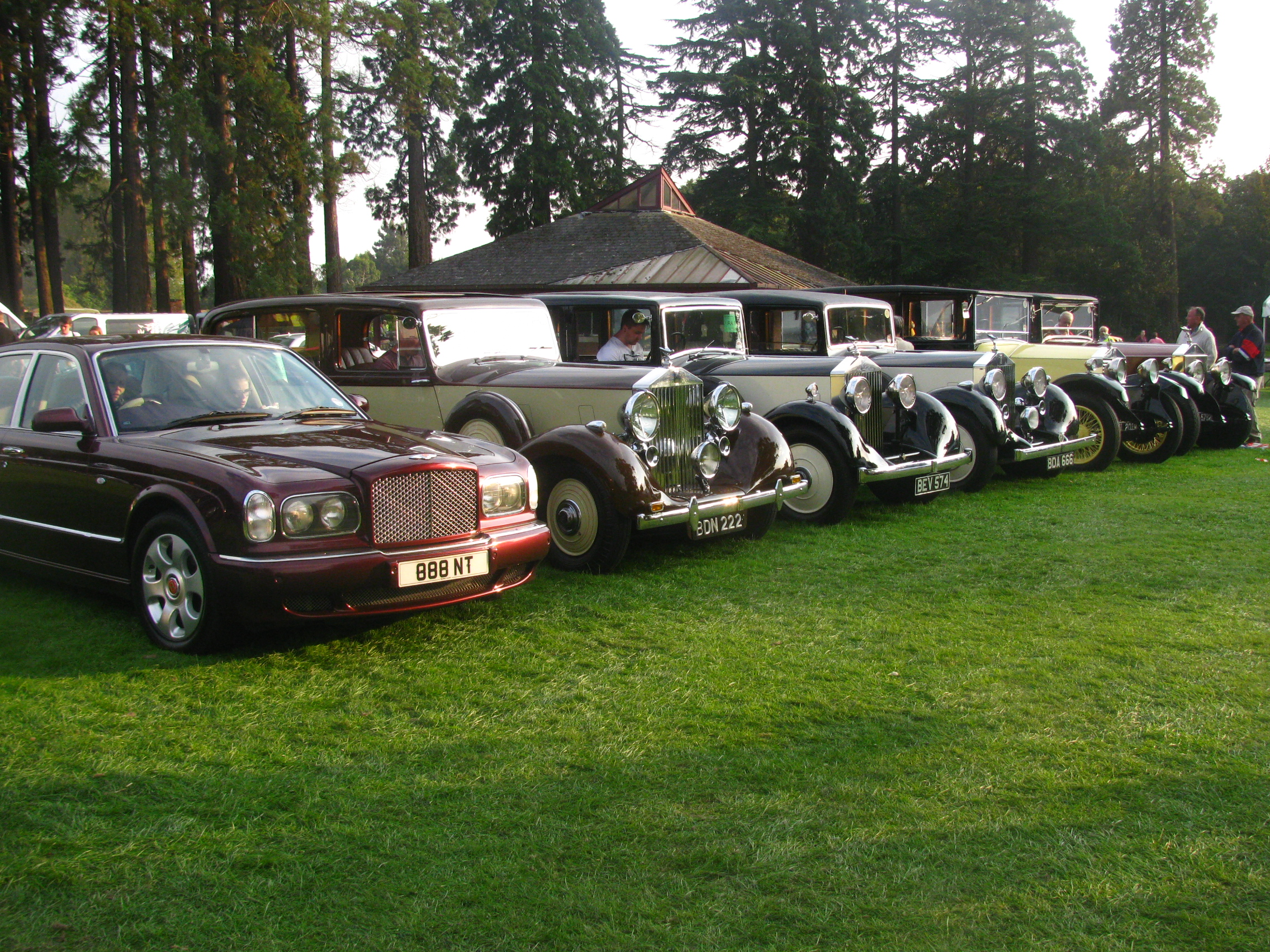
Cars on display at the final Tredegar House car show in 2014.

Tredegar House remained a school until 1974, when it was bought by Newport County Council, who set about returning the property to a stately home and ran it as a museum. The process of restoration was aided by Evan Morgan's second wife, Princess Olga Dolgorouky, who corresponded with the curators of the museum, providing accounts of the appearances of various rooms and information about the Morgan family. (Note: In an interview, Olga Dolgorouky confessed, "l wish I knew more of the historical facts about the family, but I was very young at the time and not, I must confess, terribly interested.") Under the council's tenure and beginning in 1980, a classic car show was held in the grounds of Tredegar House on an annual basis to raise funds for Leukaemia Research. The last show was held in 2014, at which point the event had raised £868,000 since 1980. The Prince and Princess of Wales visited Tredegar House in 1981. The council continued overseeing the running of the property until 2012, when it was acquired by the National Trust via a 50-year lease; the National Trust continue to open the house and gardens for visitors.

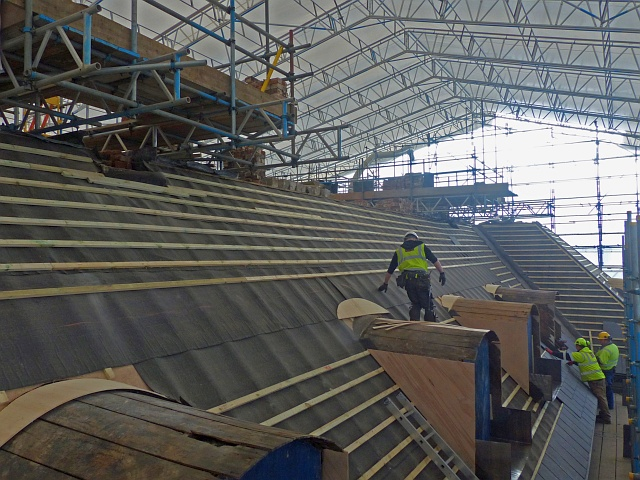
Restoration work being carried out on the roof of Tredegar House in 2017.

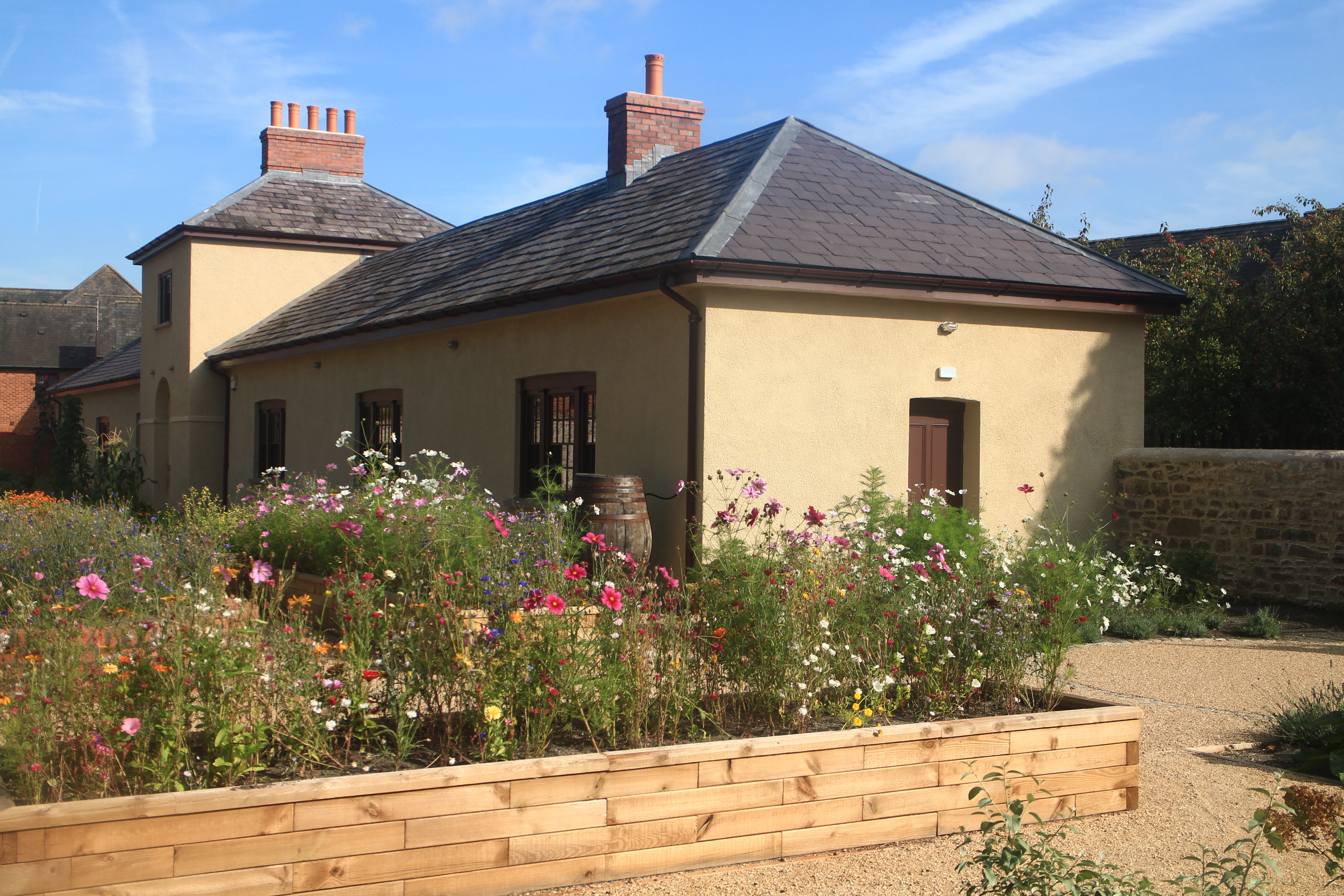
The renovated laundry building at Tredegar House.

A survey was carried out on the property at the time of the transfer, concluding that "the house and other buildings on site still needed around £4,500,000 of major work." In 2016, repairs were carried out to the roof of the north-westerly wing after rainwater had leaked into a number of attic rooms. The work consisted of rebuilding chimneys, replacing rotting roof timbers, and relaying the roof with new slates which came from Penrhyn Quarry, and was completed in 2017. In 2019, restoration work was carried out on the laundry building, which had sustained fire damage six years earlier.

During the tenure of both Newport Council and the National Trust, Tredegar House has frequently been used for filming. In 2014 an episode of the Antiques Roadshow was filmed at the property and the house's red brick exterior now features in the programme's opening sequence. Numerous episodes of Doctor Who have been filmed at and in the house, as well as the television series Being Human, Da Vinci's Demons and The Hairy Bikers.

== See also ==
- Ruperra Castle
- Tredegar Square

== Sources ==
=== Books ===
- Newman, John (2000). Gwent/Monmouthshire. The Buildings of Wales. Penguin. ISBN 0140710531.
- Smith, Peter (1975). Houses of the Welsh Countryside. London: Her Majesty's Stationery Office. ISBN 0-11-700475-8. OCLC 868639211.
- Pryce-Jones, Alan (1987). The Bonus of Laughter. London: Hamish Hamilton Ltd. ISBN 0-241-11903-0.
- Lees-Milne, James (1985). Midway on the Waves. London: Faber & Faber. ISBN 0-571-14712-7.
- Cross, William (2016). Evan, Lord Tredegar, Final Affairs: The Aftermath. Newport: Book Midden Publishing. ISBN 978-1-905914-32-6.
- Phillips, Roger (1990). Tredegar: The History of an Agricultural Estate 1300–1956. Worcestershire: The Self Publishing Association Limited. ISBN 978-1-854210-96-8.

=== Website ===
- Clark, Gregory (2023). "The Annual RPI and Average Earnings for Britain, 1209 to Present (New Series)". MeasuringWorth.
