= Alfred Frank de Prades =

French painter

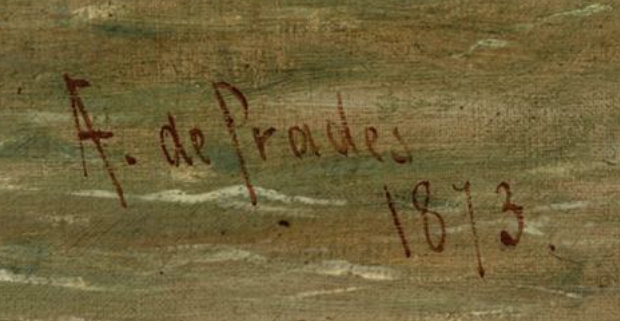
- A F de Prades' professional signature
- Born: 24 March 1825; Lunel, France
- Died: 7 July 1885 (aged 60); London, England
- Known for: Oil Paintings, watercolours
- Movement: Animalier

Alfred Frank de Prades (signed works as A F de Prades; 24 March 1825 – 7 July 1885) was a French painter working in Victorian England. An animalier best known for his paintings of horses and military subjects, de Prades’ works follow very closely the tradition of George Stubbs (1724–1806), a style which popularized him among the noble British sporting set, who heavily patronized the artist from about 1850 until his death in 1885.

== Life ==
Alfred Frank de Prades (birth name: Anacharsis François Prestreau.) was born in Lunel, Hérault, France, the son of a Huguenot shipping magnate, Emile Jacob Pierre Marie Simon Alexandre Prades-Prestreau, (Genoa 1794-St Helier after 1879) and his wife Pascale Victoire Garnier. (Lunel, Hérault, 1806—Meulan-en-Yvelines, 1875) Information on his life until the age of 25 or so is sparse, though it is clear that he was raised in England from the age of 16 when his father, Emile Prades-Prestreau, abandoned his wife in Paris and reestablished himself in London, changing his name from Prestreau to Prades.

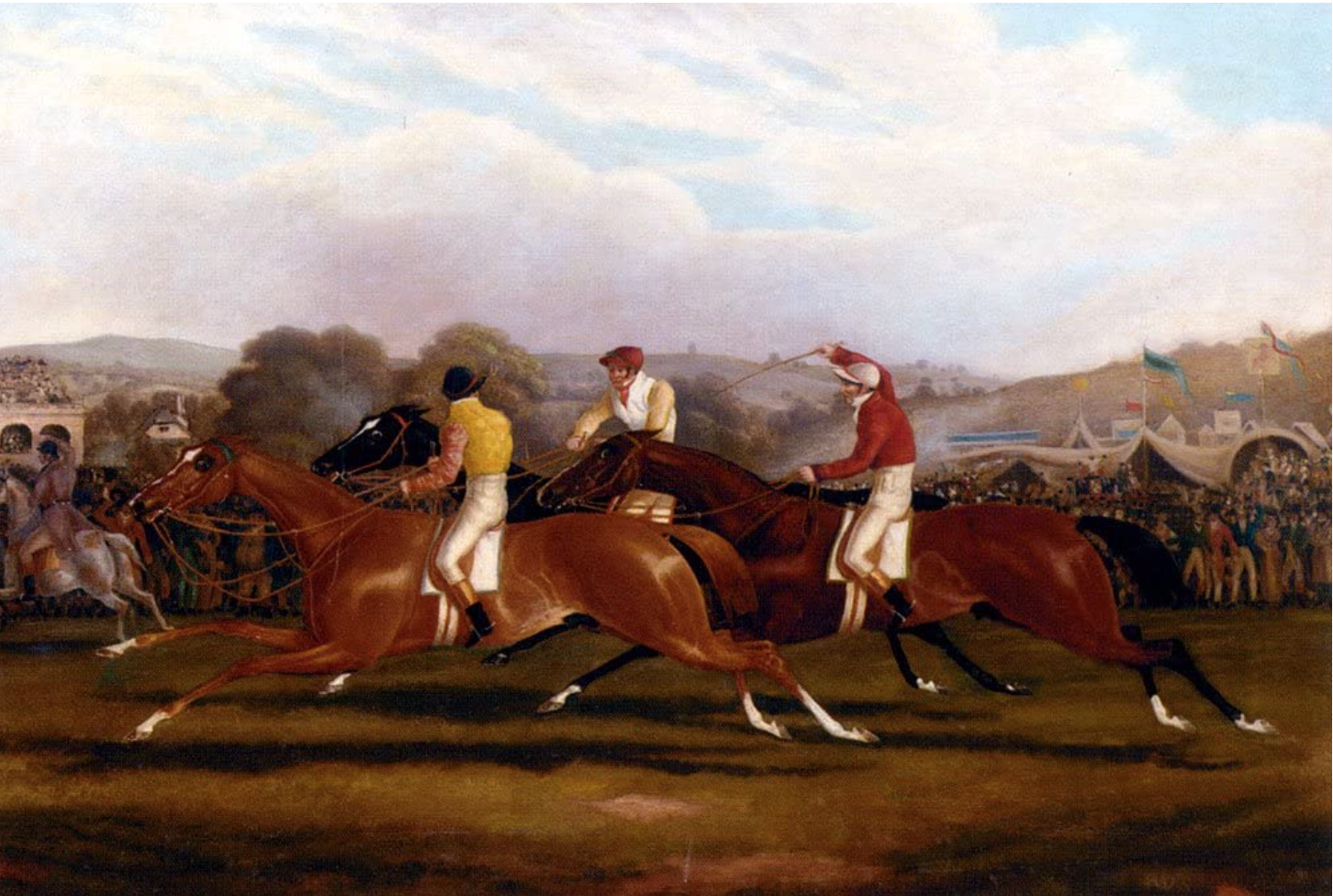
"Down the Stretch"(1838) painted at the age of 13

It is not currently known where and with whom Frank trained as an artist, but he was painting equine subjects as young as the age of 13. A surviving canvas painted at this age, "Down the Stretch", is an early, naïf study executed in 1838 showing early interest in horses, racing and his instinctual command of equine anatomy.

A F de Prades was a regular participant in shows at the British Institution, a group of artists rebelling against the formalism of the Royal Academy of Arts. However de Prades was accepted to show in at least three major exhibitions with the Royal Academy of Arts beginning with a monumental scale painting in 1857 (Exhibit. No. 1122) ”On the Heights near Boulogne, 8th September 1854: Present: HM the Emperor Louis-Napoléon; HRH Prince Albert, KG; the Duke of Newcastle, Marshal Vaillant, General Lord Seaton, General Weatherall, Colonel Fleury, Colonel Daniell, the Baron de Bourgoing, Marquis de Soulongeon, General Gray, Colonel Biddulph, etc, etc...” and quite a few other notables on horseback—an engraving of which had also been reproduced in the Illustrated London News the year before). He continued to exhibit at the Royal Academy in 1861 and 1879, as well as at the Royal Society of British Artists and the Walker Art Gallery (Liverpool) . His publicly accessible work is held by the National Army Museum,(10 associated works) Walker Art Gallery, Bristol Museum and Art Gallery, and the Royal Collection, among others. King Edward VII commissioned a de Prades’ painting of his racehorse “Fairplay”, winner of the 1882 Household Brigade Cup at Sandown, further cementing his patronage by the bon ton of the United Kingdom. “Fairplay” is recorded as hanging in Buckingham Palace in 1909 and is still part of the Royal Collection.

Unmarried, Frank de Prades moved his lodgings around the Covent Garden area of London, but traveled a considerable amount as most of his paintings were commissions from the nobility to paint themselves and their horses, as well as military men who wanted to be painted on the field of their glory. Frank died suddenly as a result of a fall from a hansom cab, fracturing his skull, 7 July 1885 at the age of 60 outside his home in London at 8 Southampton Street, and is buried with his younger brother Henri and sister in law, Annie Boles de Prades in Kensal Green Cemetery, London.

== Artistic and political influences ==
A F de Prades family’s political and revolutionary history may explain why his birth name differs from his professional name, and why the art world has been unable to verify even the most basic information about this prolific and well recognized artist. In the mid 1780s two Occitan aventuriers and shipping magnates named Pierre and Jean Jacques Prades-Prestreau from Lunel, (Hérault, Languedoc-Roussillon) formed an international trading company representing nine French manufacturers in ports around the Mediterranean. At the French revolution Pierre espoused the Jacobin cause to such an extent that when he married Marie Anne Claire Françoise Piccinni, the daughter of the Neapolitan inventor of Opera Buffa, Niccolò Piccinni, the popular composer was placed under house arrest in Naples by Marie Antoinette’s sister, Maria Carolina of Austria, Queen of Naples for 4 years as a result of the marriage.

Pierre Prades-Prestreau worked to pave the way for Napoléon Bonaparte’s invasion of Naples and Genoa, later working as a Foraging Inspector for the French Army in the Kingdom of the Two Sicilies Pierre’s son, A. F. De Prades’ rentier father, Emile Pierre Prestreau was also a progressive, supporting the Republican leftists in France against the Monarchy, and at this time he disappeared from his home in Paris with his two oldest sons, Anacharsis François (the subject of this article) and Emile Henri and moved to London in 1838 about the same time that the future Napoleon III found refuge in the English capital. Living in Southwark, near his musically talented Piccinni relatives, Emile dropped their legal name, Prestreau, and revived the older de Prades family soubriquet, while young Anacharsis François, later anglicised his first names from "Anacharsis François" to "Alfred Frank" to better fit into the Fitzrovia milieu of London and the British upper class in which he lived the rest of his life.

Frank de Prades was also embroiled in the Nottingham Election Riots in April 1865 when he stopped with Sir Robert Juckes Clifton, at Clifton Hall, Nottingham for a house party and to paint Lady Clifton and her horse. Sir Robert, who was standing for parliamentary election at the time, was accused of fomenting the riots to get back at his rival for the seat. De Prades, who was questioned as to his participation gave evidence in the hearings that he and Sir Robert were of virtually identical appearance and the similarity may have led to the confusion amongst witnesses. Sir Robert was cleared of the charges, and de Prades was not formally implicated or charged.

== Gallery of representative works ==
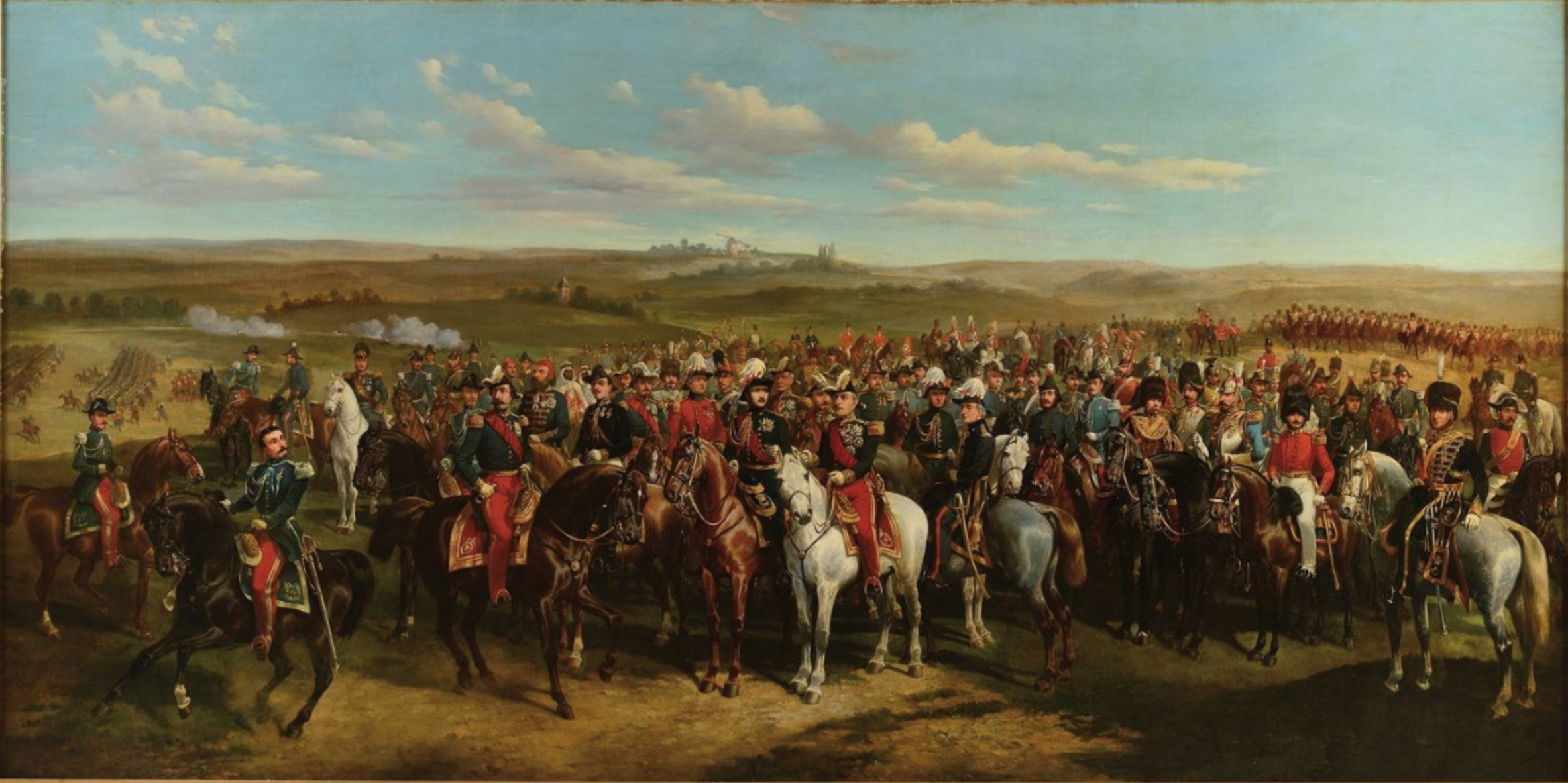
His painting of "The meeting of Prince Albert and Emperor Napoleon III on the Heights of Boulogne, 8 September 1854", formerly in the collection of billionaire Christopher Forbes, was sold in France in 2016 for €33,000.

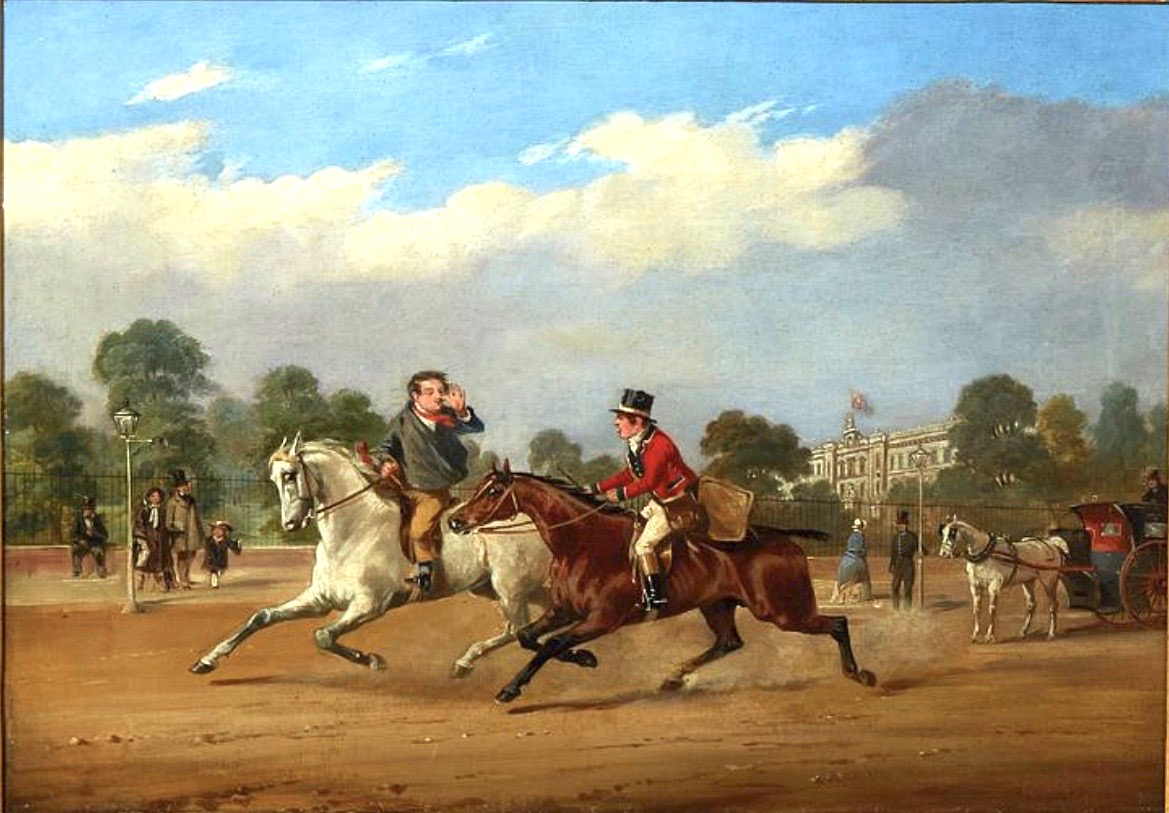
“Contempt for the Post Boy” (1851), private collection in South Carolina. The rider on the gray mare is thought to be de Prades himself in artist's smock and kerchief

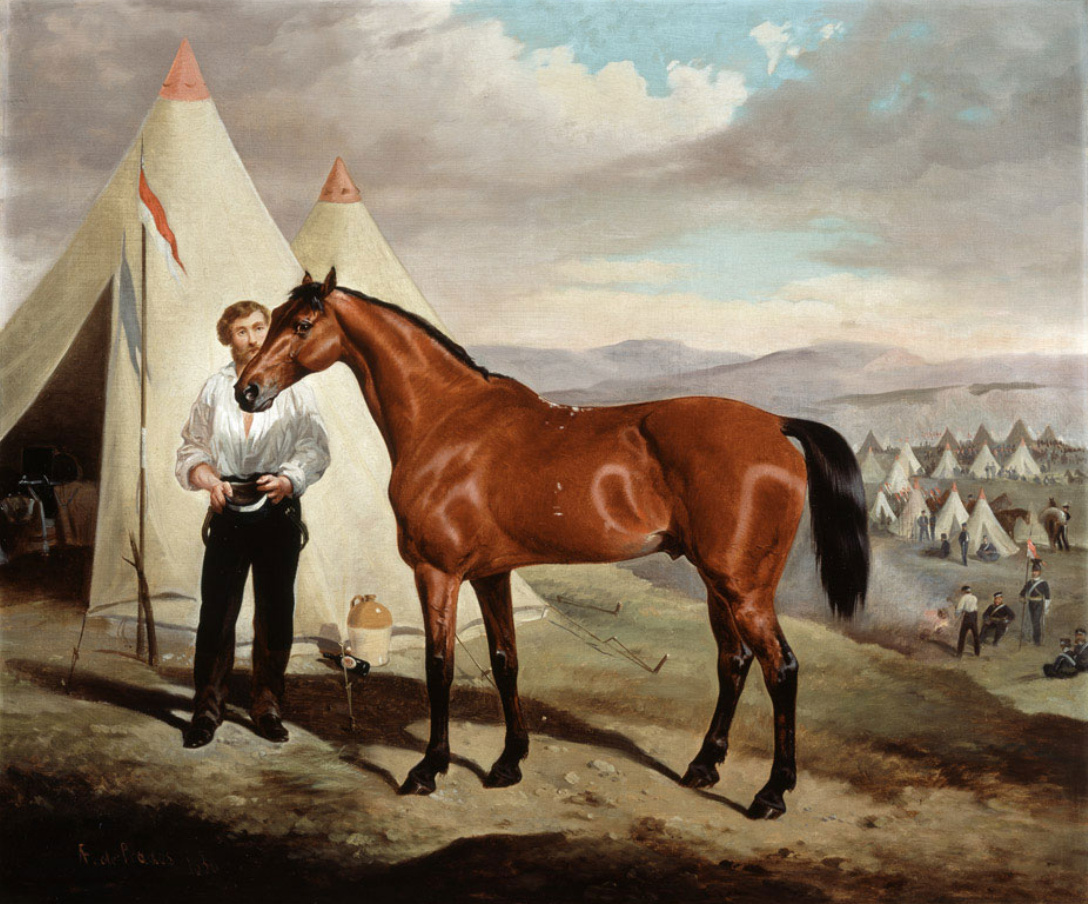
“Sir Briggs” (after 1854) the famous warhorse of Charles Morgan, Baron Tredegar(later Viscount Tredegar) ridden during the Charge of the Light Brigade now in the collection of the Royal Army Museum

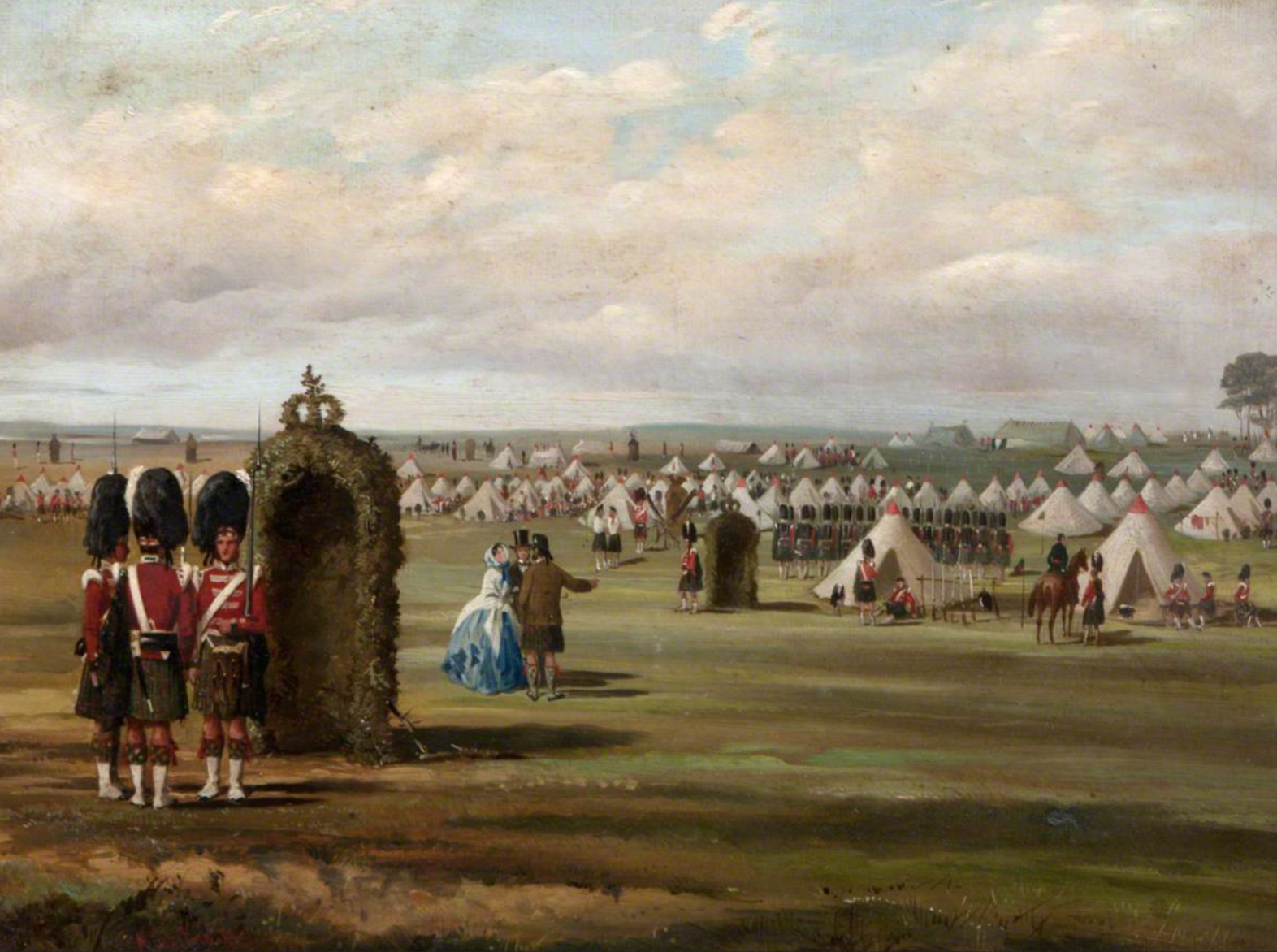
"79th Regiment at Chobham Camp,1853" Chobham Camp (Surry) was the first major army manoeuvres in the Crimean war in 1853. De Prades joined thousands of visitors, including Queen Victoria, to depict this event through several sketches and watercolours that were made into engravings. Currently in the collection of the Highlanders Museum (Ardersier, Inverness, Scotland)

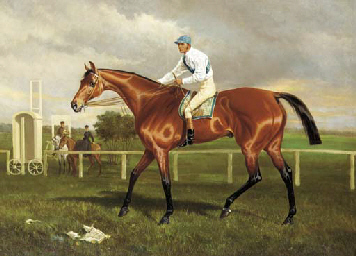
"Robert the Devil (horse)" (1881), one of the greatest racehorses of the 19th century, winner of the Grand Prix de Paris, the St-Leger and the 1881 Ascot Gold Cup
