= Louis Mosley =

British businessman and politician (born 1983)

Member of Kensington and Chelsea Council
- In office 2011–2014
- Preceded by: Iain Hanham
- Succeeded by: Charles Williams
- Ward: Brompton

Personal details
- Born: c. February 1983 (age 43)
- Citizenship: United Kingdom
- Party: Conservative
- Spouse: Nura Khan (m. 2014)
- Children: 4
- Relatives: Oswald Mosley (paternal grandfather); Diana Mosley (paternal grandmother); Mary Anna Marten (maternal grandmother); Max Mosley (paternal uncle); Jonathan Guinness, 3rd Baron Moyne (paternal half-uncle); Desmond Guinness (paternal half-uncle); Nicholas Mosley, 3rd Baron Ravensdale (paternal half-uncle); Napier Marten (maternal uncle)
- Education: Worcester College, Oxford
- Occupation: Businessman; politician
- Known for: CEO, Palantir Technologies UK

Louis Mosley (born c. February 1983) is a British businessman and politician who is currently CEO of Palantir UK. A member of the Mosley family, Mosley is also a former Conservative Party councillor.

== Family background and early life ==
Louis Mosley was born in February 1983 to Oswald Alexander Mosley and Charlotte Marten. His paternal grandparents were Sir Oswald Mosley, leader of the British Union of Fascists (BUF), and Diana Mitford, one of the Mitford sisters. His maternal grandparents were British Museum trustee, Mary Anna Marten (née Sturt), and Lieutenant Commander Toby Marten, son of Francis Arthur Marten. His maternal great-grandparents were Napier Sturt, 3rd Baron Alington and Lady Mary Sibell Ashley-Cooper, daughter of Anthony Ashley-Cooper, 9th Earl of Shaftesbury and Lady Constance Sibell Grosvenor. His maternal uncle is Napier Marten and his first cousin was Constance Marten. His paternal uncle was Max Mosley (1940–2021), former President of the Fédération Internationale de l'Automobile (FIA), while his paternal half-uncles were merchant banker Jonathan Guinness, 3rd Baron Moyne (1930–2026), the Irish preservationist Desmond Guinness (1931–2020), and novelist Nicholas Mosley, 3rd Baron Ravensdale (1923–2017). His paternal half-first cousins were writer Ivo Mosley, the Hon. Catherine Ingrid Guinness, Daphne Guinness, Patrick Guinness and his paternal half first cousins once removed are Daniel Mosley, 4th Baron Ravensdale, Lady Mary Charteris, and Jasmine Guinness.

Mosley stated in 2026 that he had "made [his] peace" with people making assumptions about him based on his surname, but said "I don't think people should be judged on the basis of beliefs their grandparents may have held."

Mosley was educated at Westminster School and later went up to Worcester College, Oxford, graduating in 2006.

== Career ==
=== Early career ===
Mosley's first job after university was at the Centre for Global Studies under Robert Skidelsky, who had previously authored a biography of Mosley's grandfather Oswald. After working at a failed technology start-up, Mosley entered politics as a research assistant in the office of Conservative MP for Penrith and The Border, Rory Stewart, supporting with constituent projects. He ran as a Conservative councillor in the 2011 Brompton ward by-election in Kensington and Chelsea following the death of sitting councillor Iain Hanham; he won by over 600 votes, serving until 2014. He was later reportedly selected as a Conservative prospective parliamentary candidate (PPC) for the 2017 United Kingdom general election, only to be removed by the CCHQ after a tabloid discovered his familial connections. That year, he delivered a speech at the Conservative Party Conference as chairman of the Hackney Conservative Association, arguing favour of mental health provision and warning against the stigmatising nature of everyday language. He subsequently ran again as a councillor in the Hoxton East & Shoreditch ward in the 2018 Hackney London Borough Council election, placing 12th of 13 candidates.

=== Palantir ===
Mosley worked in finance for a number of years, including at Santander UK, before moving to American technology firm Palantir in 2016. He is currently the CEO of Palantir's UK division, which employs about 25% of its total global workforce. In May 2025, Mosley was appointed to the Ministry of Defence’s Industrial Joint Council, formed of industry and government officials supporting innovation, financing, and partnership in the UK's defence sector.

Mosley has had several high-profile public moments with respect to Palantir's business in the UK. In May 2025, he publicly stated the UK's request for digital identification cards did not have the proper privacy safeguards, and Palantir would not assist the government with this project. On the other hand, as a result of public scepticism of the firm, in July 2025 he provided testimony to the Science, Innovation and Technology Committee in the House of Commons with respect to Palantir's bidding strategy for data management projects at the NHS during the COVID-19 crisis and subsequent contracts. This testimony came after years of debate about the UK government's relationship with the firm, beginning with the uncovering of exchanges between the Conservative government in 2019 with Mosley, discussing the potential for contracting with the NHS. He has also publicly spoken strongly in favour of his firm selling defence technology to Israel during the on-going Gaza war, stating that the West is allied with the state of Israel.

In December 2025, Palantir won a three year government contract with the Ministry of Defence worth £240 million, after hiring four ex-Ministry of Defence workers to the company's UK division in the same year.

Mosley continues to lead the company's growing share of work in the defence sector, supporting the deployment of AI and other advanced technologies across government functions.

== Personal life ==
In 2025, Mosley gave a speech at a rally hosted by the Alliance for Responsible Citizenship, alongside Jordan Peterson, Peter Thiel and Nigel Farage. Mosley met his wife Nura Khan while studying at Oxford, and they married in May 2014. Together they have four children.
