= Mary Anna Marten =

English aristocrat (1929–2010)

The Honourable Mary Anna Marten OBE
- Born: Mary Anna Sibell Elizabeth Sturt; 12 September 1929; Dorset, England
- Died: 20 January 2010 (aged 80)
- Burial place: Witchampton, East Dorset, England
- Education: Cheltenham Ladies' College; Somerville College, Oxford
- Occupation: Archaeologist
- Spouse: George Gosselin Marten (m. 1949; died 1997)
- Children: 6, including Napier Marten
- Parents: Napier Sturt, 3rd Baron Alington; Mary Sibell Ashley-Cooper

Mary Anna Sibell Elizabeth Marten (née Sturt, 12 September 1929 – 20 January 2010) was an English aristocrat and landowner who made legal history in the Crichel Down affair.

== Early life ==
Mary Anna Sibell Elizabeth Sturt was born on 12 September 1929 at Moor Crichel, the daughter of Napier Sturt, 3rd Baron Alington and Lady Mary Sibell Ashley-Cooper, daughter of the 9th Earl of Shaftesbury, sometime Lord Steward to the household of King George V and Queen Mary, by his wife Lady Constance Sibell Grosvenor who died in 1957, who was a friend of Queen Mary, daughter of Earl Grosvenor, and sister of Hugh Grosvenor, 2nd Duke of Westminster.

She was god-daughter to Queen Elizabeth (later The Queen Mother), and her only son, Napier Anthony Sturt Marten, was a page to Queen Elizabeth II.

She enlisted in Buckingham Palace Brownies unit, alongside Princess Margaret, and went to school in Lancaster Gate, later attending Cheltenham Ladies' College. Upon the death of her father, Baron Alington in active service in the RAF in 1940, Mary Anna inherited the Crichel House Estate in Dorset as a Minor. In 1948 she went up to Somerville College, Oxford, to read agriculture, where she met her future husband on her first day. She did not complete her degree.

Mary Anna and her husband, Lt.-Cdr. George (Toby) Gosselin Marten, (1918–1997), son of Francis Arthur Marten, were married on 25 November 1949 at Holy Trinity Brompton.

The Martens had six children.

== Crichel Down affair ==
Seven hundred and twenty-five acres (293 ha), part of the Alington family's Crichel Down estate in Dorset had been compulsorily purchased by the Government in 1938 for Royal Air Force bomb training use. The price they paid was £12,000 and Prime Minister Winston Churchill's binding undertaking in 1942 stated that should the Government no longer require the land for the designated acquisition purpose, the land would be offered back to the original owners at the same price. After the War was over, the land was no longer needed for that purpose, was transferred from the military department to the agriculture department and became a "model farm" - so the promise was not honoured. Mary Anna and her husband took on the various Government departments under successive Governments, and following a public inquiry report, in 1954 they won back the title to their original land. This resulted in the resignation of Sir Thomas Dugdale, the Agricultural Minister deemed responsible for the mishandling of the matter. The episode set a legal precedent and became known as The Crichel Down affair, a term still used in British legislation.

Mary Anna died on 18 January 2010 and following her death the entire Crichel Down estate was offered for sale but the asking price was not met. Instead, in 2013 the family sold the Grade I listed Crichel House with 400 acres (160 ha) of parkland to Richard Chilton for a reported £34 million, retaining the remaining estate.

== Archaeology ==
In 1988, Marten established The Ancient Persia Fund at the British Academy in memory of the distinguished Russian scholar Vladimir G. Lukonin. The aim of the fund was and is to encourage and support the study of Ancient Persia and related areas including Central Asia, in the period before the coming of Islam.

Marten was appointed a trustee of the British Museum.

Marten was also a trustee of the Charles Sturt Museum in Grange, South Australia. Marten was also a collector of Chinese works of art, many inherited. She was a collector of jade and of rare books

She was appointed an Officer of the Most Excellent Order of the British Empire (OBE) in the 1980 New Year Honours "for political service in Wessex".

In 2008, Marten published (privately) her memoirs entitled As it Was.

== Later life ==
Marten was High Sheriff of Dorset from 1989 to 1990.

Marten died on 18 January 2010. The funeral was held at St Giles's Church, Wimborne St Giles, Dorset, on 29 January 2010. She was buried with her husband in Witchampton Churchyard, Dorset; the grave is to the north east of the church.

== See also ==
- Disappearance of Constance Marten and Mark Gordon
