= Lukonin =

Russian surname

Lukonin is a Russian surname; its feminine counterpart is Lukonina. Notable people with the surname include:

- Mikhail Lukonin (1918–1976), Soviet Russian poet
- Nicolai Lukonin (fl. 1980s), Soviet Union Minister of Atomic Energy from 1986 to 1989
- Saratovite Sergey Lukonin, central character in 1942 Soviet drama film Lad from Our Town
- Vladimir G. Lukonin (1932–1984), Russian archaeologist and historian
- Yana Lukonina
- Anna Antonenko-Lukonina
