= Lois Sturt =

English socialite (1900–1937)

The Right Honourable The Viscountess Tredegar
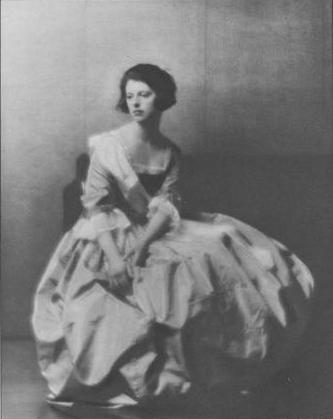
- Born: Lois Ina Sturt; 25 August 1900; United Kingdom
- Died: 18 September 1937 (aged 37); Budapest, Hungary
- Burial place: Crichel House, Dorset, England
- Known for: One of the Bright Young Things
- Spouse: Evan Morgan, 2nd Viscount Tredegar (m. 1928; sep. 1936)
- Parents: Humphrey Sturt, 2nd Baron Alington; Feodorowna Yorke

Lois Ina Morgan, Viscountess Tredegar (née Sturt, 25 August 1900 – 18 September 1937) was one of the Bright Young Things of the 1920s. Later the lover of the Earl of Pembroke and the Duke of Kent, she married Evan Morgan, 2nd Viscount Tredegar.

== Biography ==
Lois Ina Sturt was born on 25 August 1900. She was the daughter of Humphrey Sturt, 2nd Baron Alington, and Lady Feodorowna Yorke. Her maternal grandfather was Charles Yorke, 5th Earl of Hardwicke, and her brother was Napier Sturt, 3rd Baron Alington.

She became famous as the most painted woman of England: at 20 years old, she already had seven portraits taken, including 4 sketches by Etienne Drian, studies in oil by Ambrose McEvoy, Olive Snell and Gerald Kelly and a self-portrait. All seven were exhibited in 1921 at the annual show of the National Portrait Gallery. She attended the Slade School of Art and scandalizing society, she opened her own art studio in Chelsea. Wyndham Lewis said she was "the most beautiful debutante of her day" and Barbara Cartland said she was "fiery, impetuous, and with dark, flashing eyes."

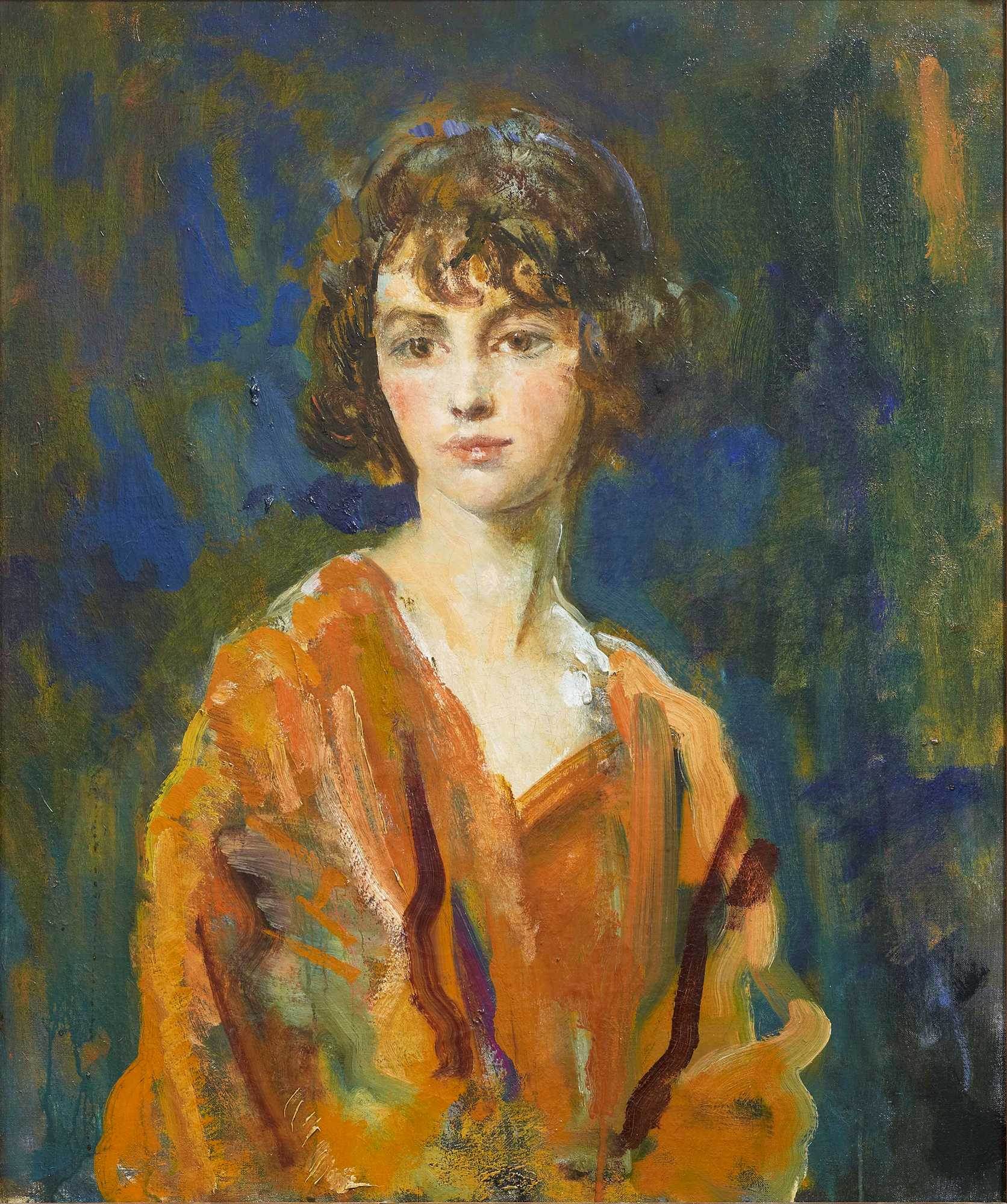
1920 – "Portrait of the Hon. Lois Sturt" by Ambrose McEvoy (Crudwell, Wilts, 1878–1927, London). Oil on canvas

She was one of the Bright Young Things of the 1920s. She was among the founders of the notorious all-night treasure hunts. She was fined for having driven her car at 51 miles an hour through Regent's Park at 2 o'clock in the morning. She had told the arresting officer, "But I must get there, I must get there before someone else finds the next clue." Her close friends were: Tallulah Bankhead, Poppy Baring, Lady Victoria Bullock, Barbara Cartland, Madame Louis Cartier, Gladys Cooper, Nancy Cunard, Mona Dunn, Hon. Diamond Hardinge, Sonia Keppel, later Hon. Mrs Roland Cubitt, Anita Leslie, Eleanor Smith, Viola Tree. Dubbed as "bacchante", she drank a lot and partied even more. She was one of the few female racehorse owners of her day. Moreover, she was an accomplished dancer and a fully trained pilot. Even if she was a trained artist, she became an actress, one of the first of the Bright Young Things to make it. In 1921, she played a court lady in The Virgin Queen (Lady Diana Cooper played Queen Elizabeth I) and in 1922 she was Nell Gwyn in The Glorious Adventure, the first British colour film.

She became the lover of Reginald Herbert, 15th Earl of Pembroke, 20 years older than her, and then of Prince George, Duke of Kent, 2 years younger than her. Other lovers include: Edward Boulenger, Duff Cooper, Tim Freeland, Augustus John, Luffy Loughborough.

Other than engagement diaries, her papers include love letters and an album of sexually explicit verses and jokes.

On 21 April 1928, she married Evan Morgan, 2nd Viscount Tredegar. They separated in 1936.

She died of a heart attack on 18 September 1937 while in Budapest. A subsequent enquiry confirmed the death was a consequence of an extreme diet that exacerbated an undiagnosed heart condition. Her ashes were brought back to England and buried in the rose garden of Crichel House.

The Hon. Lois Sturt Papers are preserved at the National Library of Wales.

== Gallery ==
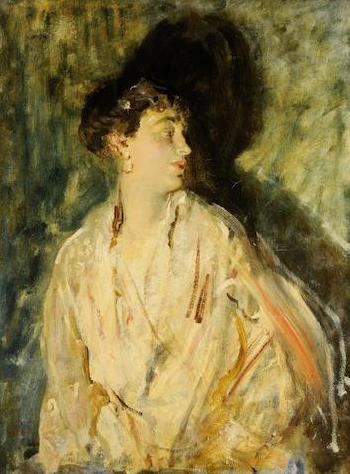
by Ambrose McEvoy, 1920

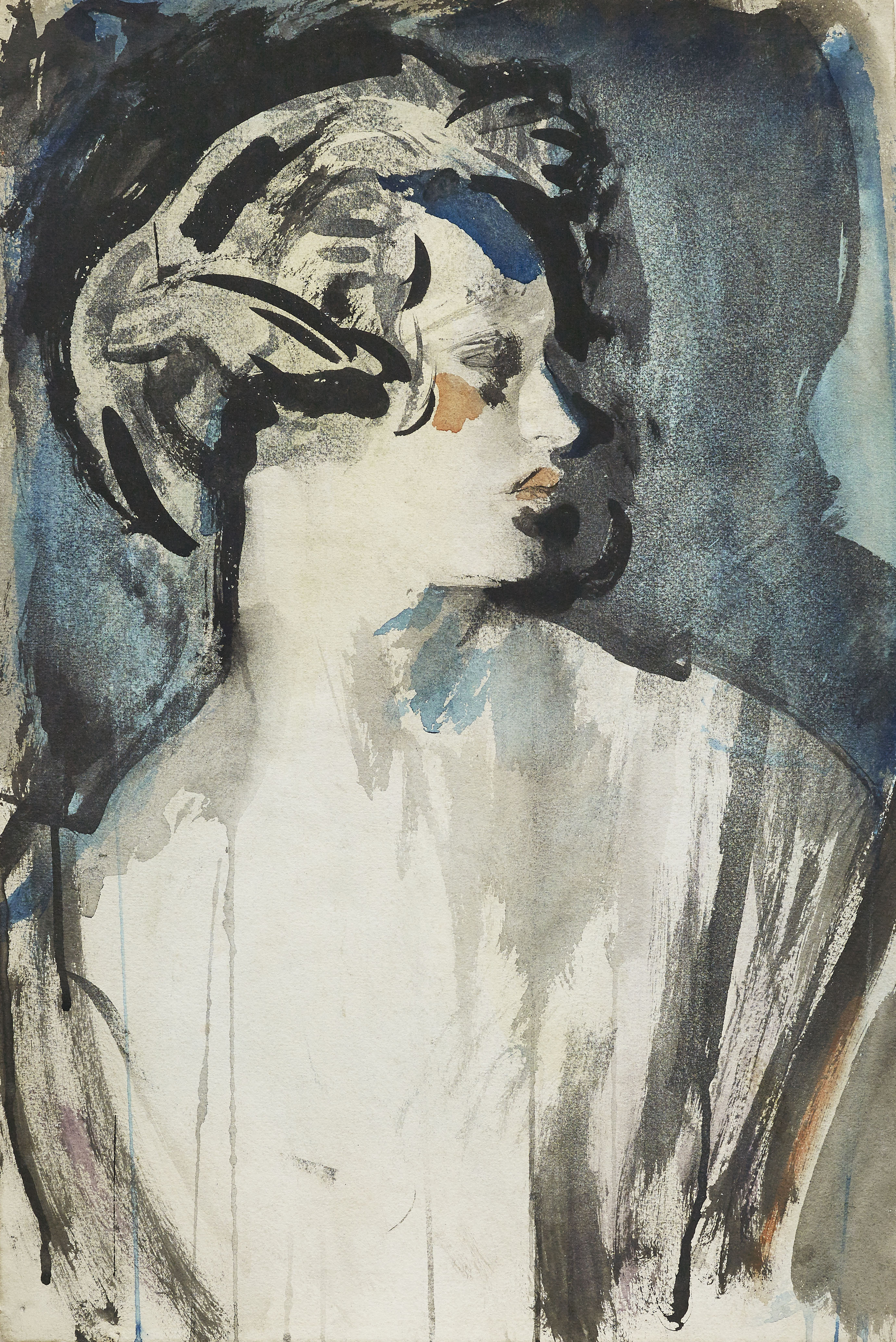
by Ambrose McEvoy, 1920
