= Poppy Baring =

British socialite & heiress (1901-1979)

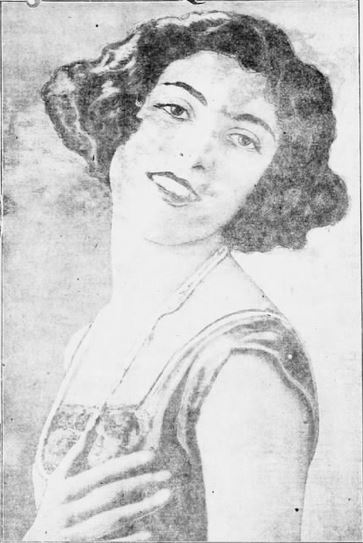
Poppy Baring

Helen Azalea "Poppy" Baring (8 November 1901 – 15 October 1979) was one of the Bright Young Things of the 1920s. She had been the prospective bride of two princes, both times judged not suitable to the match.

== Biography ==
Baring was born on 8 November 1901, the daughter of Sir Godfrey Baring, 1st Baronet of Nubia House, Cowes, Isle of Wight and Eva Hermione Mackintosh. She was the sixth generation in direct descent from United States Senator William Bingham, once America's richest man, and his wife Anne Willing Bingham. Their daughter married Baring in the first great international social match between an American bride and an English groom.

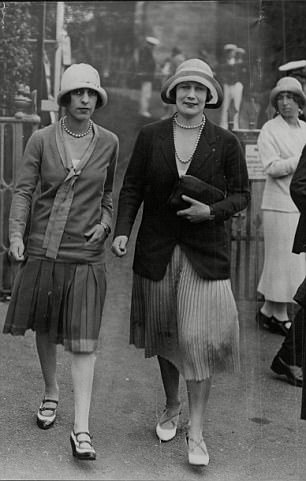
Miss Poppy Baring (left)

In 1921 Albert, Duke of York (the future king George VI), fell in love with Baring, but she had the reputation of being "fast" and fun-loving. He proposed marriage, she accepted, but Queen Mary made it clear that the match was impossible. Six years later, Baring had an affair with Prince George, Duke of Kent, but this time it was the King, George V, who objected to their romance because Poppy was not "suitable". Nevertheless, Poppy Baring was Prince George's mistress for many years.

Her close friend was Lois Sturt. In October 1925, Baring assisted at the small, and apparently secret, wedding ceremony of Francis Hastings, 16th Earl of Huntingdon, to Christina Casati, daughter of Luisa Casati. After the marriage, Baring and Napier Sturt, 3rd Baron Alington (Lois' brother) accompanied the grooms to Dover.

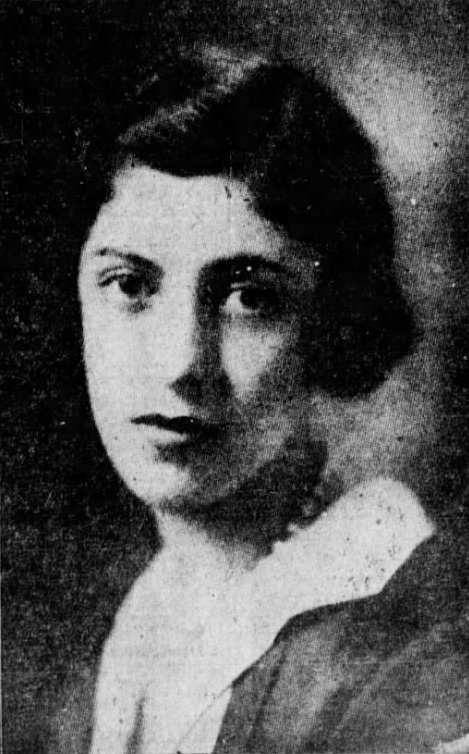
Poppy Baring, 1925

In 1927 Baring established a dress shop named "Poppy's" in Down Street where she sold the latest fashions.

On 17 December 1928 she married William Piers "Peter" Thursby, an Eton cricketer, son of Reverend Harvey William Gustavus Thursby and Margaret Emily Mount.

Raymund de Trafford was also a close friend of Baring, and went to stay with her soon after his release from prison in 1942.

She died in 1979 at her home in Sandwich, Kent.
