= Evan Morgan, 2nd Viscount Tredegar =

Welsh poet and author

The Right Honourable The Viscount Tredegar FRHortS, FRSL, FRSA, FZS, FAGS, FIL
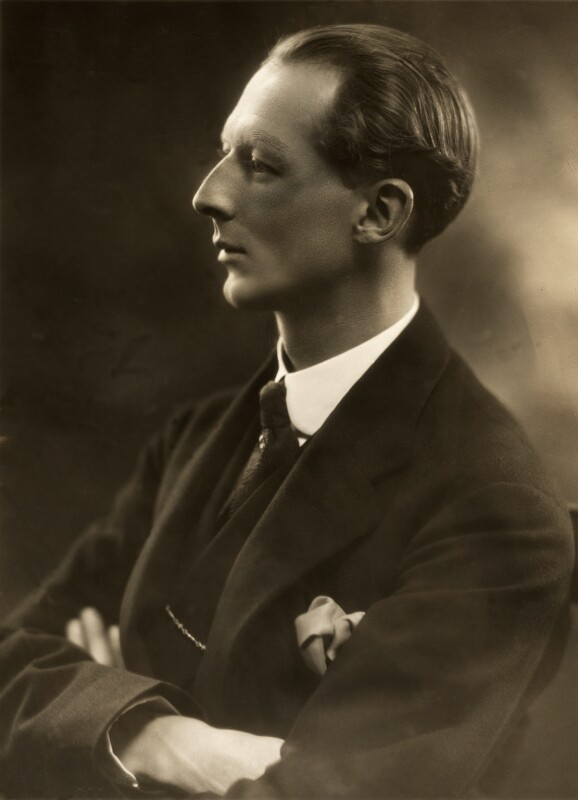
- Viscount Tredegar, 1923
- Born: 13 July 1893; 33 Cadogan Terrace, London
- Died: 27 April 1949 (aged 55); Honeywood House, Dorking
- Notable work: Fragments
- Title: 2nd Viscount Tredegar, 4th Baron Tredegar, 6th Baronet Morgan
- Spouse: Lois Sturt (m. 1928; sep. 1937) Princess Olga Dolgorouky (m. 1939: ann. 1943)
- Parents: Courtenay Morgan, 1st Viscount Tredegar (father); Lady Katharine Carnegie (mother)

Evan Frederic Morgan, 2nd Viscount Tredegar (13 July 1893 – 27 April 1949) was a Welsh peer, poet and eccentric. Following the death of his father on 3 May 1934, Morgan became the 2nd Viscount and 4th Baron Tredegar, and the 6th Morgan Baronet. Morgan was also known to his friends as Evan Tredegar.

== Life ==
He was the son of Courtenay Morgan, 1st Viscount Tredegar, and Lady Katharine Carnegie, daughter of the 9th Earl of Southesk.

Morgan was educated at Eton College and Christ Church, Oxford University. While working as private secretary to a government minister, W. C. Bridgeman, in 1917, he became friendly with another Oxford man, the poet Robert Graves, who had been a school friend of Evan's cousin, Raymond Rodakowski. They shared an interest in both poetry and the supernatural.

A Roman Catholic convert, Morgan was a chamberlain of the sword and cape to Popes Benedict XV and Pius XI. An accomplished occultist, he was hailed by Aleister Crowley as the 'Adept of Adepts'.

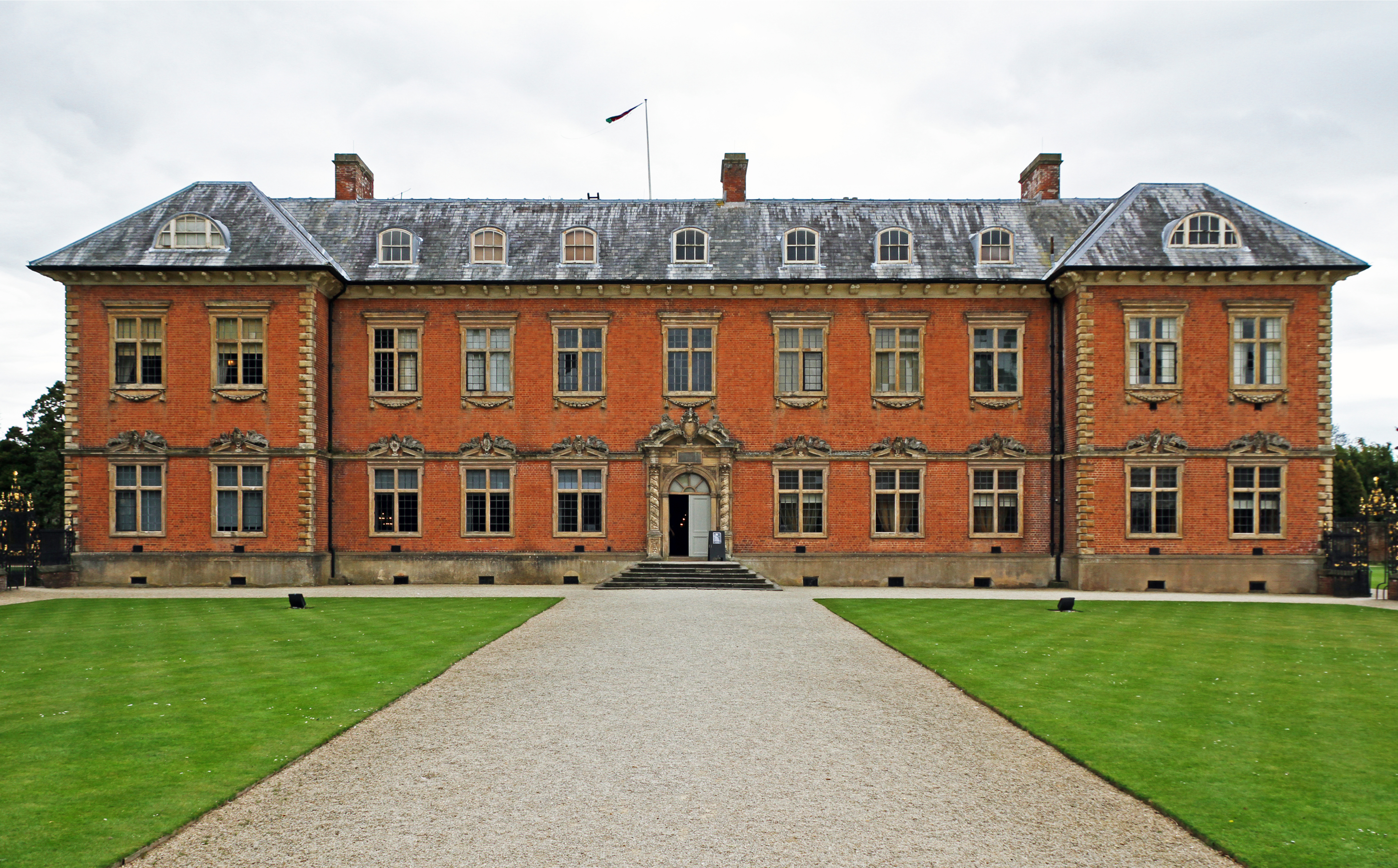
Tredegar House

In 1929, he unsuccessfully stood as the Conservative candidate for Limehouse. After the death of his father, in 1934, he took possession of the family seat of Tredegar House, near Newport, where he had a menagerie of animals and birds. He dedicated one room, his 'magik room', to his study of the occult.

He fought in the First World War, gaining the rank of Lieutenant in the service of the Welsh Guards, and in 1930 was appointed an honorary Colonel. During the Second World War with MI8, his responsibility was to monitor carrier pigeons. He carelessly let slip on occasion departmental secrets to two girl guides and was court martialed but not sent to jail or worse.

Morgan provided inspiration for the character "Ivor Lombard" in Aldous Huxley's 1921 Crome Yellow, and for Eddie Monteith in Ronald Firbank's The Flower Beneath the Foot.

He was decorated with the following awards:

- Knight of Honour and Devotion, Sovereign and Military Order of Malta
- Knight of Justice, Constantinian Order of St. George
- Knight of Justice, Order of St. John of Jerusalem (KJStJ)
- Commander, Order of the Holy Sepulchre (with star)

In 1937 or 1938 Edith Mary Hinchley painted him. This painting is in the National Trust collection.

== Marriages ==
Despite his known homosexuality, he married twice.

- Lois Ina Sturt (1900–1937), an actress and daughter of Humphrey Napier Sturt, 2nd Baron Alington of Crichel House and Lady Feodorowna Yorke, on 1 April 1928. She died in 1937.
- Princess Olga Sergeivna Dolgorouky (1915–1998), daughter of General Prince Serge Alexandrovitch Dolgorouky and Irina Vassilievna Narishkina, on 13 March 1939; this union was annulled in 1943.

During a luncheon with Marie Belloc Lowndes in 1946, Morgan stated that he was "toying with the idea of proposing to Lady Illingworth", a wealthy widower, in an attempt to secure the finances of the depleted Tredegar estates. Belloc noted "[Morgan] has an enormous number of acquaintances – I fear no friends."

== Death ==
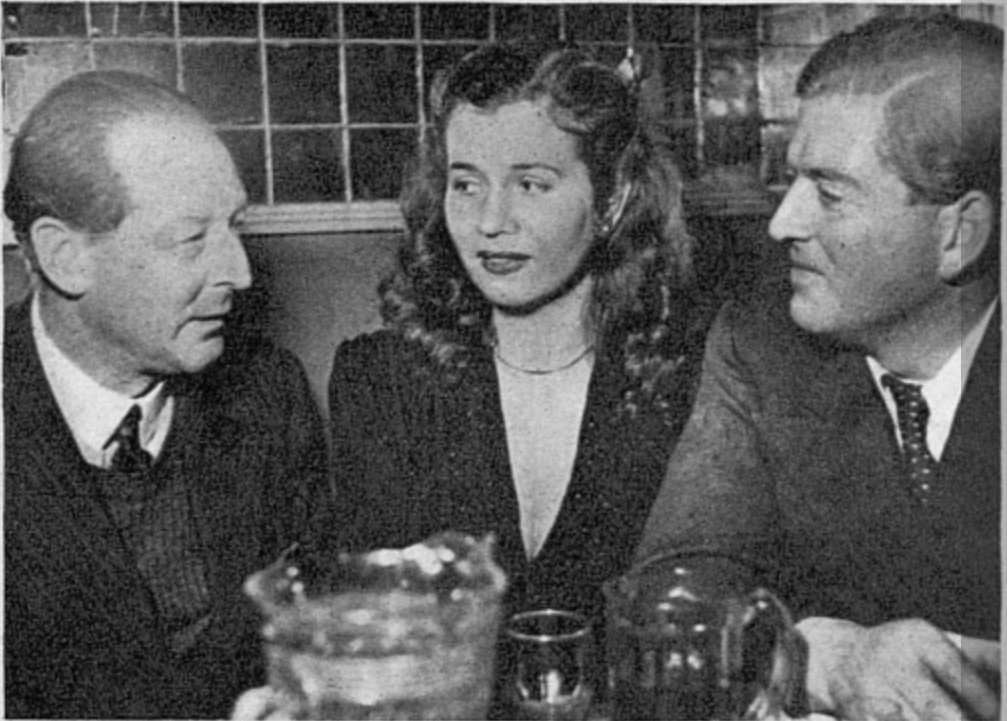
(left to right) Morgan in his final years with Russian actress, Valentine Murck, and Giles Romilly, nephew of Winston Churchill, photographed at the Gargoyle Club in 1947.

Evan Morgan died on 27 April 1949, aged 55. As he died childless, the viscountcy became extinct. However, the barony and estates passed to his uncle, Frederic, who became the fifth Baron Tredegar. To avoid further death-duties on his own demise, Frederic had arranged for Tredegar House and the estates to be passed immediately to his son, John (latterly the sixth and final Baron Tredegar), who eventually disposed of both the house and estates due to taxation.

== Works ==
- Fragments
- Gold and Ochre
- At Dawn
- The Eel
- The City of Canals

Peerage of the United Kingdom
Preceded by Courtenay Morgan	Viscount Tredegar; 1934–1949	Extinct
Preceded by Courtenay Morgan	Baron Tredegar; 1934–1949	Succeeded by Frederic Morgan
