= Mary Sturt, Baroness Alington =

English socialite and member of the Bright Young Things

The Right Honourable The Lady Alington
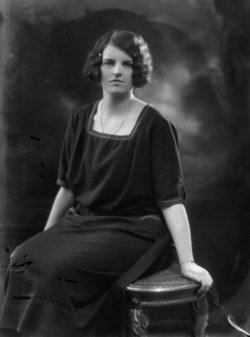
- Lady Mary Ashley-Cooper, 1922
- Born: 3 October 1902; London, England
- Died: 2 August 1936 (aged 33); London, England
- Burial place: Witchampton, East Dorset, England
- Occupation: Socialite
- Spouse: Napier Sturt, 3rd Baron Alington (m. 1928)
- Children: Mary Anna Marten
- Parents: Anthony Ashley-Cooper, 9th Earl of Shaftesbury; Lady Constance Sibell Grosvenor

Mary Sibell Sturt, Baroness Alington (born Lady Mary Sibell Ashley-Cooper; 3 October 1902 – 2 August 1936) was an English socialite and member of the Bright Young Things.

== Biography ==
Lady Mary Ashley-Cooper was born in 1902 in London, the eldest daughter of Anthony Ashley-Cooper, 9th Earl of Shaftesbury and Lady Constance Sibell Grosvenor. Queen Mary was her godmother.

On 27 November 1928, Lady Mary Sibell Ashley-Cooper married Napier Sturt, 3rd Baron Alington (1896–1940) at St Margaret's, Westminster. They had one daughter, Hon. Mary Anna Sibell Elizabeth Sturt (1929–2010).

Tall and athletic, Lady Alington was a champion swimmer. She was a member of the Bath Club and in 1934 won the club's swimming title.

In 1936, she died after an operation for acute appendicitis, aged 33 years old. She is buried at All Saints Churchyard, Witchampton. Her husband died of pneumonia while on active service during World War II in Cairo and is buried there.
