= Napier Marten =

British former landowner and former page to Queen Elizabeth II

- Born: Napier Anthony Sturt Marten; 1959 (age 66–67)
- Education: Eton College
- Occupations: Landowner, Crichel House
- Spouse: Virginie de Selliers (divorced)
- Children: 4, including Constance Marten
- Parent(s): Toby Marten; Mary Anna Marten
- Relatives: Napier Sturt, 3rd Baron Alington (grandfather)

Napier Anthony Sturt Marten (born in 1959) is a member of what was historically the British landowning upper class, and a former page to Queen Elizabeth II from 1973 to 1975. He is known for his connection to the Sturt/Marten family, a lineage of wealthy landowners with historical ties to the British royal family, and for his mother's friendship with Queen Elizabeth II.

== Early life ==
Napier Anthony Sturt Marten (born 1959) was born into the Sturt/Marten family. His mother was a British Museum trustee, Mary Anna Marten (née Sturt), and his father was Lieutenant Commander Toby Marten. Napier's maternal grandfather was Napier Sturt, 3rd Baron Alington. Marten's sister is the writer Charlotte Mosley. Marten grew up in Crichel House (which he subsequently inherited), an 18th-century Georgian country house in Dorset, England, with his five sisters. He was educated at Eton College.

== Personal life ==
Napier's familial ties extended to the royal family through his mother, Mary Anna Marten, a childhood friend of royal sisters Princess Margaret and Queen Elizabeth II. She was the god-daughter of Queen Elizabeth the Queen Mother.

Marten and his ex-wife, French counsellor Virginie de Selliers, had four children together, including Constance. The Independent newspaper reported that in or around 1996 Marten disappeared and emerged in Australia. He subsequently handed control of the Crichel Estate to his son Max in 2013. Max reportedly sold the house, with part of the farming acreage, for £34 million. On his return to the UK from Australia Marten worked as a tree surgeon and is now a film and music producer.

== Honours ==
From 1973 to 1975 Napier served as a Page of Honour to Queen Elizabeth II.

== See also ==
- Disappearance of Constance Marten and Mark Gordon
