= Lady Lettice Ashley-Cooper =

British aristocrat, socialite, and airwoman (1911–1990)

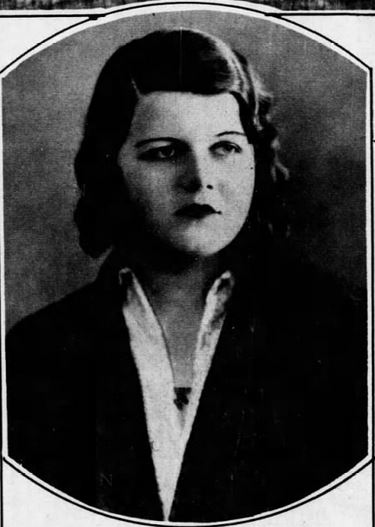
- Lady Lettice Mildred Mary Ashley-Cooper
- Born: Lettice Mildred Mary Ashley-Cooper; 12 February 1911; Wimbledon, London
- Died: 24 November 1990 (aged 79)
- Noble family: Ashley-Cooper
- Father: Anthony Ashley-Cooper, 9th Earl of Shaftesbury
- Mother: Constance Sibell Grosvenor

Lady Lettice Mildred Mary Ashley-Cooper OStJ (12 February 1911 – 24 November 1990) was a British aristocrat, socialite, and airwoman. One of the Bright Young Things of the 1920s, she served in the Women's Auxiliary Air Force during World War II.

== Biography ==
Lady Lettice Mildred Mary Ashley-Cooper was born in Wimbledon, London in 1911, the daughter of Anthony Ashley-Cooper, 9th Earl of Shaftesbury and Constance Sibell Grosvenor.

In 1936, her name was linked with the name of Edward VIII as a possible future wife; the King had declared that the future queen had to be "English, good, beautiful and a sportswoman", and the newspaper identified four names: Lady Anne Hope, daughter of the viceroy of India; Lady Mary Grosvenor, daughter of the Duke of Westminster; Lady Angela Montagu-Douglas-Scott, sister of the Duchess of Gloucester; and Lady Lettice Ashley-Cooper.

In the World War II, she joined the Women's Auxiliary Air Force, promoted Corporal in charge of the Orderly Room in October 1939 and commissioned as an Assistant Section Officer in June 1941.

She was appointed Officer of the Most Venerable Order of the Hospital of St. John of Jerusalem (O.St.J.).

In 1974, she wrote Two 17th Century Dorset Inventories and in 1986 Unusual Behaviour, published by Gollancz.
