= The New Year's Rate Plan =

- Russian: Тариф «Новогодний»
- Directed by: Yevgeny Bedarev
- Written by: Elena Laskareva; Anastasiya Volkova
- Produced by: Elena Glikman; Igor Tolstunov
- Starring: Valeriya Lanskaya; Maksim Matveyev
- Cinematography: Maksim Shinkorenko
- Music by: Roman Arkhipov; Andrey Zuev
- Release date: 2008
- Country: Russia
- Language: Russian

The New Year's Rate Plan (Russian: Тариф «Новогодний», romanized: Tarif Novogodniy) is a 2008 Russian comedy film directed by Yevgeny Bedarev. and written by Elena Laskareva and Anastasiya Volkova.

== Plot ==
In the film, a peculiar phone service plan called the "New Year’s Tariff" comes into play when a young man named Andrey receives it as a gift from an unusual woman while purchasing a replacement phone. On New Year's Eve in 2009, Andrey and his friends gather in Red Square and, following a local custom, he dials a random number to wish a stranger a happy new year. This call connects him to Alyona, a woman heartbroken after a recent breakup. When they attempt to meet, Andrey and Alyona are shocked to discover they are living one year apart: Andrey in 2009, and Alyona in 2008.

Determined to meet her, Andrey visits Alyona’s address but learns she was tragically killed in a car accident just 15 minutes before New Year’s 2009. To save her, he investigates the accident, uncovering every detail, and relays this information to Alyona through a video message in her timeline. Alyona, now aware of the impending disaster, assembles a team to prevent it. On New Year's Eve 2009, they plan to delay the chain of events that caused the crash. However, their efforts fail, and in a twist, Andrey—recently back from a work trip—ends up on the bus that Alyona was meant to avoid. Despite the team’s intervention, the collision occurs, but the bus miraculously avoids an explosion. Andrey, stepping off the bus, is nearly struck by a tanker truck but is saved when Alena calls his name at the last second, reuniting them safely at the end of 2008.

The film concludes with a café waitress visiting the same phone store, where the mysterious salesperson offers her the "New Year’s Tariff" along with her new phone, hinting at future magical connections.

== Cast ==
- Valeriya Lanskaya as Alyona
- Maksim Matveyev as Andrey
- Svetlana Sukhanova as Rita
- Yegeny Slavsky as Vadim
- Boris Korchevnikov as Pashka
- Miroslava Karpovich as Olechka
- Ekaterina Malikova as Masha
- Mark Bogatyryov as Maks
- Stanislav Belyaev as Danilov (as Stas Belyaev)
- Tatyana Vasilyeva as strange woman
- Mariya Aronova as bus driver
- Mikhail Porechenkov as Vitaly Barinov
- Dmitry Dyuzhev as fuel truck driver
- Valery Meladze as colorful Georgian
- Nonna Grishayeva as flower girl
- Fyodor Dobronravov as driver in the car park
- Anna Antonenko-Lukonina as elderly passenger
