= 2010 Kensington and Chelsea London Borough Council election =

2010 Kensington and Chelsea Borough Council election
- 6 May 2010

All 54 seats to Kensington and Chelsea London Borough Council

	First party	Second party	Third party
Party	Conservative	Labour	Liberal Democrats
Leader's seat	0
Last election	45 seats, 60.4%	9 seats, 18.9%	1 seat, 0%
Seats won	43	12	1
Seat change	▼6	▲3	Steady
Popular vote	80,516	32,894	30,154
Percentage	%	%	%
Swing	▼0	▲0%	▲0%
- Results of the 2010 Kensington and Chelsea London Borough council election. Conservatives in blue and Labour in red.
Council control before election
Conservative
Council control after election
Conservative

Elections for the Royal Borough of Kensington and Chelsea were held on 6 May 2010. The 2010 General Election and other local elections took place on the same day.

In London borough council elections the entire council is elected every four years, unlike some other English councils, where a third of the councillors are elected for a four-year term in three successive years, with no elections in the fourth.

Map of the results of the 2010 Kensington and Chelsea council election. Conservatives in blue, Labour in red and Liberal Democrats in yellow.

== Results ==
Royal Borough of Kensington and Chelsea election result 2010
Party	Seats	Gains	Losses	Net gain/loss	Seats %	Votes %	Votes	+/−
Conservative	43	0	2	-2				
Labour	9	0	0	0				
Liberal Democrats	2	2	0	+2				

== Ward results ==
=== Abingdon ===
Abingdon (3)
Party	Candidate	Votes	%	±%
Conservative	Victoria Borwick	1,853	61.4	
Conservative	James Husband	1,821	60.4	
Conservative	Joanna Gardner	1,786	59.2	
Liberal Democrats	Jeremy Good	883	29.3	
Liberal Democrats	John Faulder	865	28.7	
Liberal Democrats	Susan Pritchard	774	25.7	
Labour	David Lewis	365	12.1	
Labour	Christina Alkaff	363	12.0	
Labour	Margaret Pringle	347	11.5	
Turnout		3,017	48.8	
Conservative hold		Swing		
Conservative hold		Swing		
Conservative hold		Swing		

=== Brompton ===
Brompton (3)
Party	Candidate	Votes	%	±%
Conservative	Shireen Ritchie	1,567	66.6	
Conservative	Iain Hanham	1,548	65.8	
Conservative	Quentin Marshall	1,523	64.7	
Liberal Democrats	Mary Harris	452	19.2	
Liberal Democrats	Ann Coxon	410	17.4	
Labour	Martin Green	307	13.0	
Labour	Susie Parsons	282	12.0	
Labour	Daver Perry	214	9.1	
Turnout		2,353	39.9	
Conservative hold		Swing		
Conservative hold		Swing		
Conservative hold		Swing		

=== Campden ===
Campden (3)
Party	Candidate	Votes	%	±%
Conservative	Tim Ahern	1,786	66.4	
Conservative	Christopher Buckmaster	1,774	66.0	
Conservative	Robert Freeman	1,682	62.6	
Liberal Democrats	Lucy Elliot	592	22.0	
Liberal Democrats	Priscilla Congreve	524	19.5	
Liberal Democrats	James Crichton-Miller	484	18.0	
Labour	Mark Sautter	285	10.6	
Labour	Ghulam Lasharie	273	10.2	
Labour	John Parsons	261	9.7	
Turnout		2,689	48.1	
Conservative hold		Swing		
Conservative hold		Swing		
Conservative hold		Swing		

=== Colville ===
Colville (3)
Party	Candidate	Votes	%	±%
Liberal Democrats	Carol Caruana	1,459	45.8	
Liberal Democrats	Timothy Jones	1,244	39.1	
Labour	Dez O'Neill	1,096	34.4	
Labour	Amir Akhrif	1,082	34.0	
Liberal Democrats	Peter Kosta	1,061	33.3	
Labour	Beinazir Lasharie	913	28.7	
Conservative	Alexander Bond	735	23.1	
Conservative	Samia Bentayeb	730	22.9	
Conservative	Lloyd North	696	21.9	
UKIP	David Coburn	115	3.6	
Turnout		3,183	54.7	
Liberal Democrats gain from Labour		Swing		
Liberal Democrats gain from Labour		Swing		
Labour hold		Swing		

=== Courtfield ===
Courtfield (3)
Party	Candidate	Votes	%	±%
Conservative	Tony Holt	1,525	64.0	
Conservative	Elizabeth Rutherford	1,519	63.8	
Conservative	Anthony Coates	1,472	61.8	
Liberal Democrats	Carl Michel	486	20.4	
Liberal Democrats	William Somers	477	20.0	
Liberal Democrats	Michael Young	434	18.2	
Labour	Brian Dodgeon	374	15.7	
Labour	Susan Warren	279	11.7	
Labour	Damian Williams	239	10.0	
Turnout		2,381	37.5	
Conservative hold		Swing		
Conservative hold		Swing		
Conservative hold		Swing		

=== Cremorne ===
Cremorne (3)
Party	Candidate	Votes	%	±%
Conservative	Maighread Condon-Simmonds	1,588	52.9	
Conservative	Mark Daley	1,542	51.4	
Conservative	Matthew Neal	1,327	44.2	
Labour	Richard Briggs	730	24.3	
Labour	Lesley-Anne Arnold	728	24.3	
Liberal Democrats	Julian England	693	23.1	
Labour	Richard Chute	636	21.2	
Liberal Democrats	Elizabeth Ford	620	20.7	
Liberal Democrats	Ann Lawrence	578	19.3	
UKIP	Alasdair Seton-Marsden	155	5.2	
Turnout		3,001	51.7	
Conservative hold		Swing		
Conservative hold		Swing		
Conservative hold		Swing		

=== Earl's Court ===
Earl's Court (3)
Party	Candidate	Votes	%	±%
Conservative	Barry Phelps	1,358	50.3	
Conservative	Terence Buxton	1,262	46.7	
Conservative	Jonathon Read	1,150	42.6	
Liberal Democrats	Norma Peacock	621	23.0	
Liberal Democrats	Rosemary Somers	578	21.4	
Labour	Joel Bishop	569	21.1	
Liberal Democrats	Linda Wade	560	20.7	
Labour	Mabel McKeown	487	18.0	
Green	William Ridley	302	11.2	
Labour	Oliver Dearie	179	6.6	
Independent	Malcolm Spalding	174	6.4	
Turnout		2,702	41.8	
Conservative hold		Swing		
Conservative hold		Swing		
Conservative hold		Swing		

=== Golborne ===
Golborne (3)
Party	Candidate	Votes	%	±%
Labour	Emma Dent Coad	1,653	53.4	
Labour	Pat Mason	1,637	52.9	
Labour	Bridget Hoier	1,564	50.5	
Liberal Democrats	Frances Owen	568	18.4	
Conservative	Dougal Steward	544	17.6	
Conservative	Yasin Sliti	533	17.2	
Liberal Democrats	James Whelan	506	16.4	
Conservative	Nicholas Beyts	484	15.6	
Liberal Democrats	Manal Yusuf	427	13.8	
Green	Benjamin Parker	344	11.1	
Turnout		50.6	3,094	
Labour hold		Swing		
Labour hold		Swing		
Labour hold		Swing		

=== Hans Town ===
Hans Town (3)
Party	Candidate	Votes	%	±%
Conservative	Timothy Coleridge	1,930	71.6	
Conservative	Nicholas Paget-Brown	1,782	66.1	
Conservative	Mary Weale	1,650	61.2	
Liberal Democrats	Josie Mayers	399	14.8	
Labour	Isabel Atkinson	356	13.2	
Labour	Paulina Emanuel	352	13.1	
Green	Julia Stephenson	334	12.4	
Liberal Democrats	Francois-Joseph-Rene Turmel	321	11.9	
Labour	St John Adlard	296	11.0	
Turnout		2,696	40.1	
Conservative hold		Swing		
Conservative hold		Swing		
Conservative hold		Swing		

=== Holland ===
Holland (3)
Party	Candidate	Votes	%	±%
Conservative	Deborah Collinson	1,832	60.4	
Conservative	Warwick Lightfoot	1,771	58.4	
Conservative	Joan Hanham	1,760	58.0	
Liberal Democrats	Simon Beard	659	21.7	
Liberal Democrats	William Keeling	544	17.9	
Liberal Democrats	James Shortt	466	15.4	
Labour	Michael Costello	453	14.9	
Labour	Marian Kearney	439	14.5	
Labour	Stuart Shapro	354	11.7	
Green	Zahra-Melan Ebrahimi-Fardouee	344	11.3	
Turnout		3,032	49.6	
Conservative hold		Swing		
Conservative hold		Swing		
Conservative hold		Swing		

=== Norland ===
Norland (3)
Party	Candidate	Votes	%	±%
Conservative	Andrew Lamont	1,864	54.7	
Conservative	David Lindsay	1,804	52.9	
Conservative	Julie Mills	1,654	48.5	
Labour	Simon Blanchflower	787	23.1	
Labour	Roger Bowerman	722	21.2	
Liberal Democrats	Guy Mayers	714	21.0	
Liberal Democrats	Christopher Horner	693	20.3	
Labour	Mohammed Elshimi	681	20.0	
Liberal Democrats	Angele Vidal-Hall	534	15.7	
Turnout		3,407	55.0	
Conservative hold		Swing		
Conservative hold		Swing		
Conservative hold		Swing		

=== Notting Barns ===
Notting Barns (3)
Party	Candidate	Votes	%	±%
Labour	Judith Blakeman	1,923	53.6	
Labour	John Atkinson	1,684	47.0	
Labour	Todd Foreman	1,639	45.7	
Conservative	Gerard Hargreaves	1,106	30.8	
Conservative	Max Chauhan	932	26.0	
Conservative	Sam Mackover	924	25.8	
Liberal Democrats	Alexandra Tatton-Brown	756	21.1	
Liberal Democrats	Robin Tuck	633	17.7	
Liberal Democrats	Mohamed Yusuf	572	16.0	
Turnout		3,586	55.2	
Labour hold		Swing		
Labour hold		Swing		
Labour hold		Swing		

=== Pembridge ===
Pembridge (3)
Party	Candidate	Votes	%	±%
Conservative	Barbara Campbell	1,521	58.1	
Conservative	David Campion	1,411	53.9	
Conservative	Doreen Weatherhead	1,348	51.5	
Liberal Democrats	John Campbell	736	28.1	
Liberal Democrats	Rosamund Pease	546	20.8	
Liberal Democrats	Martin Wilson	536	20.5	
Green	Michael Enright	460	17.6	
Labour	Adolphe Bukasa	339	12.9	
Labour	Margaret Delahey	318	12.1	
Labour	Christabel Gurney	316	12.1	
Turnout		2,620	48.6	
Conservative hold		Swing		
Conservative hold		Swing		
Conservative hold		Swing		

=== Queen's Gate ===
Queen’s Gate (3)
Party	Candidate	Votes	%	±%
Conservative	Fiona Buxton	1,763	69.4	
Conservative	Andrew Dalton	1,677	66.0	
Conservative	Daniel Moylan	1,658	65.2	
Liberal Democrats	Barry Brown	488	19.2	
Liberal Democrats	Sheila McGurk	476	18.7	
Liberal Democrats	John Blamey	431	17.0	
Labour	Angus McNeice	275	10.8	
Labour	Caroline Tod	252	9.9	
Labour	William Stirling	230	9.1	
Turnout		2,541	41.0	
Conservative hold		Swing		
Conservative hold		Swing		
Conservative hold		Swing		

=== Redcliffe ===
Redcliffe (3)
Party	Candidate	Votes	%	±%
Conservative	Frances Taylor	1,922	66.5	
Conservative	Marie-Therese Rossi	1,921	66.4	
Conservative	Charles Williams	1,775	61.4	
Liberal Democrats	Katerina Porter	541	18.7	
Liberal Democrats	John Drake	476	16.5	
Liberal Democrats	Patrick Leavey	464	16.0	
Labour	Thomas Brown	362	12.5	
Labour	John Atkinson	349	12.1	
Labour	Marwan Elnaghi	290	10.0	
Turnout		2,892	43.7	
Conservative hold		Swing		
Conservative hold		Swing		
Conservative hold		Swing		

=== Royal Hospital ===
Royal Hospital (3)
Party	Candidate	Votes	%	±%
Conservative	Elizabeth Campbell	2,029	72.3	
Conservative	Ian Donaldson	1,994	71.1	
Conservative	Emma Will	1,879	67.0	
Liberal Democrats	Penelope Pocock	491	17.5	
Liberal Democrats	Giso van Loon	383	13.6	
Green	Ev Hesketh	321	11.4	
Labour	Catherine Atkinson	297	10.6	
Labour	Norma Morris	206	7.3	
Labour	Janet Williams	200	7.1	
Turnout		2,806	50.3	
Conservative hold		Swing		
Conservative hold		Swing		
Conservative hold		Swing		

=== St Charles ===
St Charles (3)
Party	Candidate	Votes	%	±%
Labour	Pat Healy	1,407	43.3	
Labour	Bob Mingay	1,305	40.2	
Conservative	Matthew Palmer	1,292	39.8	
Labour	Christine Robson	1,243	38.2	
Conservative	Dominic Johnson	1,163	35.8	
Conservative	Rock Feilding-Mellen	1,148	35.3	
Liberal Democrats	Robert Larkins	671	20.6	
Liberal Democrats	Joe Tatton-Brown	627	19.3	
Liberal Democrats	Brian Orrell	544	16.7	
Turnout		3,250	52.7	
Labour gain from Conservative		Swing		
Labour gain from Conservative		Swing		
Conservative hold		Swing		

=== Stanley ===
Stanley (3)
Party	Candidate	Votes	%	±%
Conservative	Merrick Cockell	1,828	70.2	
Conservative	Paul Warrick	1,704	65.5	
Conservative	Will Pascall	1,669	64.1	
Liberal Democrats	Moya Denman	480	18.4	
Labour	Annabelle Giles Louvros	376	14.4	
Liberal Democrats	Owen Etoe	373	14.3	
Labour	Margaret Corbett	322	12.4	
Labour	Peter Koumi	258	9.9	
Liberal Democrats	George Herford	256	9.8	
Turnout		2,603	49.1	
Conservative hold		Swing		
Conservative hold		Swing		
Conservative hold		Swing		

== Changes 2010–2014 ==
The Conservatives lost the Earl's Court Ward by-election in September 2010 to the Liberal Democrats and narrowly won the Cremorne Ward by-election by only 19 votes. Many commentators blamed the Conservative councillors led by Merrick Cockell for these poor results, stating that the council did not adequately take into account residents' views on projects such as the proposed Thames Tideway Tunnel and the Earl's Court building works.

Holland by-election, 22 July 2010
Party	Candidate	Votes	%	±%
Conservative	Rock Feilding-Mellen	649	75.0	+17.0
Liberal Democrats	Martin Wilson	146	16.9	−4.8
UKIP	Bruce Machan	70	8.1	N/A
Majority		503	58.2	
Turnout		865	14.0	
Conservative hold		Swing		

The by-election was called following the resignation of Cllr Joan Hanham.

Cremorne by-election, 16 September 2010
Party	Candidate	Votes	%	±%
Conservative	Gerard Hargreaves	602	41.2	−10.2
Labour	Mabel McKeown	583	39.9	+15.6
Liberal Democrats	Peter Kosta	180	12.3	−10.8
Green	Julia Stephenson	51	3.5	N/A
UKIP	David Coburn	49	3.1	−2.1
Majority		19	1.3	
Turnout		1,462	24.9	
Conservative hold		Swing		

The by-election was called following the resignation of Cllr Mark Daley.

Earls Court by-election, 16 September 2010
Party	Candidate	Votes	%	±%
Liberal Democrats	Linda Wade	703	44.8	+24.1
Conservative	Malcolm Spalding	594	37.8	−12.5
Labour	Joel Bishop	151	9.6	−11.5
Independent	Elizabeth Arbuthnot	49	3.1	N/A
Independent	Jack Bovill	29	1.8	N/A
Green	Michael Enright	26	1.7	−8.5
UKIP	Richard Bridgeman	20	1.1	N/A
Majority		109	6.9	
Turnout		1,570	24.0	
Liberal Democrats gain from Conservative		Swing		

The by-election was called following the resignation of Cllr Barry Phelps.

Brompton by-election, 9 June 2011
Party	Candidate	Votes	%	±%
Conservative	Louis Mosley	1,975	91.9	+26.1
Labour	Mark D. Sautter	89	4.1	−8.9
Liberal Democrats	Mary T. L. Harris	86	4.0	−15.2
Majority		1,886	87.8	
Turnout		2,150		
Conservative hold		Swing		

The by-election was called following the death of Cllr Iain Hanham.

Queen's Gate by-election, 9 June 2011
Party	Candidate	Votes	%	±%
Conservative	Sam Mackover	663	71.7	+5.7
Liberal Democrats	John Blamey	100	10.8	−6.2
Labour	Keith Stirling	82	8.9	−1.9
UKIP	David Coburn	80	8.6	N/A
Majority		563	60.9	
Turnout		925		
Conservative hold		Swing		

The by-election was called following the death of Cllr Andrew Dalton.

Norland by-election, 6 October 2011
Party	Candidate	Votes	%	±%
Conservative	Catherine Faulks	675	43.8	−10.9
Labour	Beinazir Lasharie	438	28.4	+5.3
Liberal Democrats	Peter Kosta	358	23.2	+2.2
UKIP	Peter Stringfellow	70	4.5	N/A
Majority		237	15.4	
Turnout		1,540	24	
Conservative hold		Swing		

The by-election was called following the resignation of Cllr Andrew Lamont.

Brompton by-election, 28 June 2012
Party	Candidate	Votes	%	±%
Conservative	Abbas Barkhordar	650	70.3	+3.7
Labour	Mark Sautter	103	11.1	−1.9
Liberal Democrats	Moya Denman	101	10.9	−8.3
UKIP	Raheem Kassam	71	7.7	N/A
Majority		547	59.2	
Turnout		925		
Conservative hold		Swing		

The by-election was called following the death of Cllr Shireen Ritchie.
