= Richard Chilton =

American businessman and investor (born 1958)

Richard Chilton Jr.
- Born: June 10, 1958 (age 68); Ho-Ho-Kus, New Jersey, US
- Education: Alfred University (B.A.)
- Occupation: Hedge fund manager
- Title: Chairman, CEO, CIO and founder, Chilton Investment Company
- Board member of: Metropolitan Museum of Art
- Spouse: Maureen Chilton
- Children: 4

Richard Lockwood Chilton Jr. (born June 10, 1958) is an American businessman. He is the founder, chairman, CEO and chief investment officer (CIO) of Chilton Investment Company, a global investment management firm, which as of June 2014 had roughly $4 billion of assets under management. Chilton is also the founder, chairman, and CIO of Chilton Trust Company, a private wealth management company.

== Early life ==
Chilton grew up in Ho-Ho-Kus, New Jersey. Raised with three siblings, he is the oldest son of Richard Chilton Sr. and Elizabeth Chilton. His father was an advertising executive in New York City and his mother a historic preservationist, artist and horticulturalist.

Chilton earned a bachelor's degree in finance and economics from Alfred University.

== Career ==
Chilton began his career at Merrill Lynch in mergers and acquisitions. In 1983, he became an analyst for Alliance Capital, and in 1990 he worked at Allen & Company, a private bank.

In 1992, Chilton left Allen & Company to form Chilton Investment Company with $5 million. The company is headquartered in Connecticut with offices in New York City, Palm Beach, London, and Hong Kong.

In 2012, Chilton made the Forbes 400 list and in 2015, ranked #1533 on Forbes' list of wealthiest people. In 2015, his net worth was estimated at US$1.2 billion.

== Philanthropy ==
Chilton stated that his two main priorities are the environment and culture. Chilton and his wife serve as directors of the Chilton Family Foundation, which prior to 2012, gave $2–5 million annually. The Chilton Family Foundation has donated at least $30 million.

Chilton sits on the board of trustees of the Metropolitan Museum of Art. In 2010, he donated approximately $200,000 to the museum and in 2011 donated over $2 million. In 2006, he gave $1.2 million to the land trust in Darien, Connecticut. Chilton is also Chairman Emeritus of the Darien Foundation for Technology and Community, which funds projects for technology and education, where he donated $300,000 in 2011.

Chilton is a former board member of the Robin Hood Foundation, a charitable organization which attempts to alleviate problems caused by poverty in New York City, to which he gave nearly $6 million. He is also Chairman Emeritus of Greenwich Academy, a girls' school in Greenwich, Connecticut. Chilton and his wife also run scholarship programs for students at universities in Chengdu, China.

== Personal life ==
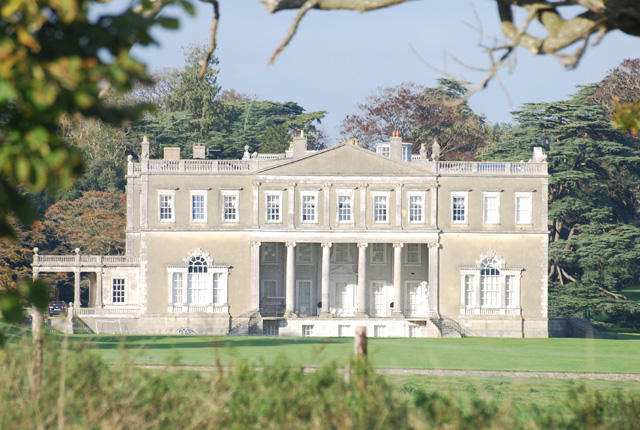
Crichel House

In 2006, Chilton co-founded Hourglass Wine Company in Napa Valley, and in 2017 authored Adventures with Old Vines: A Beginner’s Guide to Being a Wine Connoisseur.

Chilton is married to Maureen: they have four children and reside in Darien, Connecticut.

Chilton is owner of two plantations in South Carolina: White Hall Plantation in Colleton County and Buckfield Plantation in Hampton County. He also owns the Crichel Down, Dorset, estate including Crichel House which he bought for £34 million in 2013.
