= Mikhail Lukonin =

Soviet poet (1918–1976)

- Михаил Луконин
- Born: 29 October 1918; Kilinchi, Astrakhan Governorate, RSFSR
- Died: 4 August 1976 (aged 57); Moscow, Soviet Union
- Education: Maxim Gorky Literature Institute
- Occupations: Poet, writer
- Writing career
- Genre: Poetry
- Notable awards: USSR State Prize, Order of Lenin, Order of the Red Banner of Labour, Medal "For Battle Merit", Medal "For the Defence of Moscow", Medal "For the Victory over Germany in the Great Patriotic War 1941–1945", Jubilee Medal "In Commemoration of the 100th Anniversary of the Birth of Vladimir Ilyich Lenin"

Mikhail Kuzmich Lukonin (Russian: Михаил Кузьмич Луконин; October 29, 1918 – August 4, 1976) was a Soviet and Russian poet, writer and war correspondent. He was born in Kilinchi and in his youth worked in the Stalingrad Tractor Plant. He started publishing poetry in his teens. He attended the Maxim Gorky Literature Institute from 1937 to 1941. He was a veteran of the Winter War and also worked as a war correspondent in the Great Patriotic War. In October 1941, he was wounded in the village of Negino. The following year, he joined the Communist Party.

Initially influenced by the work of Vladimir Mayakovsky, Lukonin forged his own style later on. Much of his poetry about the front was compiled in a volume titled Heartbeat (1948). He was known for longer poems on the theme of postwar reconstruction. He won a Stalin Prize in 1949 for a poem titled “The Working Day,” and a State Prize in 1973 for the collection “Necessity”. He was elected first secretary of the Moscow branch of the Union of Writers, but died soon after his appointment to this post.

His selected poetry was translated into English by Dorian Rottenberg and published by Progress Publishers.

He was married to a Russian actress Anna Antonenko-Lukonina.
