= Princess Olga Dolgorouky =

Russian princess and aristocrat (1915–1998)

The Right Honourable The Viscountess Tredegar
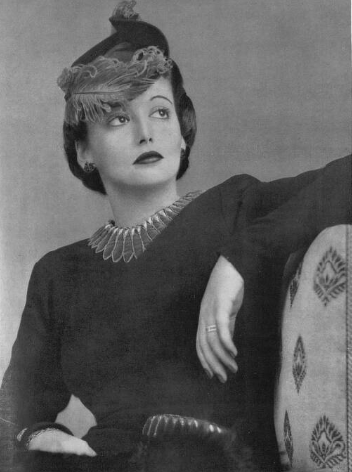
- Featured in Tatler, 1939.
- Born: Olga Sergeivna Dolgorouky; 13 May 1915; Petrograd, Russian Empire
- Died: 19 January 1998 (aged 82); Guernsey
- Spouse(s): George Trotsky-Seniutovich (m. 1934, divorced) Evan Morgan, 2nd Viscount Tredegar (m. 1939; ann. 1943)
- Parent(s): Sergey Dolgorouky; Irina Naryshkina

Olga Sergeivna Morgan, Viscountess Tredegar (Russian: Ольга Сергеевна Морган; née Dolgoruky [Долгорукова]; 13 May 1915 – 19 January 1998) was a Russian exile and socialite. She was a member of the Russian nobility from birth, and British nobility through her marriage to Evan Morgan, 2nd Viscount Tredegar while retaining her adherence to the Russian Orthodox Church. She was among those saved in 1919 when King George V sent the battleship HMS Marlborough to Crimea to rescue what was left of the nobility and Imperial Family after the Russian Revolution.

== Early life ==
She was born Princess Olga Sergeivna Dolgorouky on 13 May 1915 to Major General Prince Sergey Aleksandrovich Dolgoruky (Russian: Сергей Александрович Долгорукий, 1872–1933) and Irina Vassilievna Naryshkina (Ирина Васильевна Нарышкина, 1879–1917). Following the death of her mother in 1917, Dolgorouky and her father moved to Paris, where they lived alongside other Russian exiles, and Frogmore.

After the death of her father in 1933, "she was often seen in London in the company of White Russians, and frequented the various Russian tea rooms as well as the wider social scene. Olga was photographed in Tatler and was a lover of fun, high society parties and dancing." In an interview, Morgan said of her youth, "In those days we did not have television and the art of conversation, wit, and interesting and intelligent friends were in much demand."

== Marriages ==
She married firstly in 1934, to George Trotsky-Seniutovich, the son of a noted businessman. The marriage was unsuccessful, and they divorced in Paris.

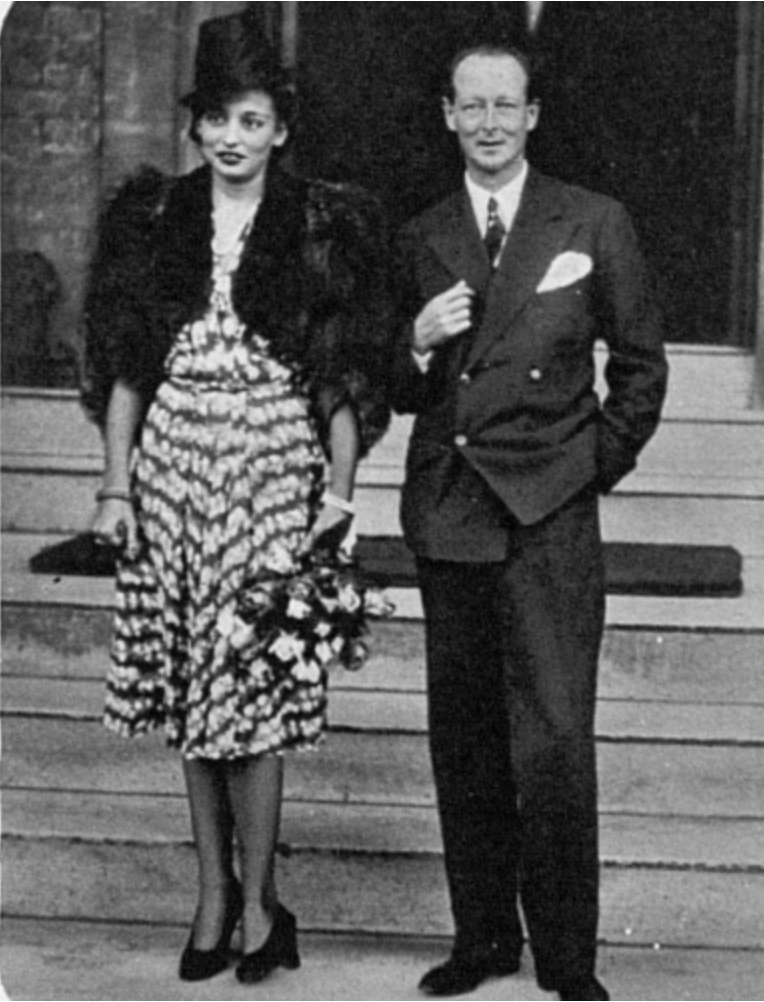
The newly wed Viscount and Viscountess Tredegar, arriving at Tredegar House in 1939.

On 13 March 1939, she, married Evan Morgan, 2nd Viscount Tredegar, the head of the Morgan family of Tredegar, a dynasty which had existed in Wales for over 500 years. The union was one of convinience, providing Evan with a social cover-up for his homosexuality and Olga a more secure lifestyle, being an exiled noble. The marriage took place at a registry office in Singapore and took no more than ten minutes. Until July, Evan and Olga stayed in Java, Indonesia, where Evan was reported to have had a native-style home.

When Viscount and the new Viscountess Tredegar returned from their honeymoon to Tredegar House (Evan's ancestral home in Newport, Wales) in July 1939, they were presented a telegram box as a gift from the staff. At Tredegar House, Morgan was a hostess for her husband's extravagant weekend house parties, as well as charitable concerts and events hosted there throughout the Second World War. During the War, Morgan trained in nursing with St. John's Ambulance, practising in the local Royal Gwent Hospital, and engaged in various societies and charitable organisations, earning her much local popularity.

In 1943, Morgan petitioned for the marriage to be annulled on the grounds of her husband's "incapacity". In 1949, Evan became ill following a trip to Rome. Olga nursed him at his mother's residence, Honeywood House in West Sussex, in his final days. Following the annulment, Morgan received a yearly allowance from the Tredegar Estate. On Evan's death, Morgan claimed that she was owed a remaining life balance of £20,000 from the estate. (Note: £20,000 in 1949 equates to approximately £611,000 in 2025, according to calculations based on the Consumer Price Index measure of inflation.) The estate executors made an offer of a £6,000 (Note: £6000 in 1949 equates to approximately £183,000 in 2025, according to calculations based on the Consumer Price Index measure of inflation.) payment and discharge of the £534 (Note: £534 in 1949 equates to approximately £16,000 in 2025, according to calculations based on the Consumer Price Index measure of inflation.) which she owed to the estate, which she accepted.

== Later life and death ==
Following her annulment, Morgan never remarried, retaining the style Viscountess Tredegar until her death. She lived in London and finally Guernsey, where she joined a small group of aristocratic British expatriates. As of 1950, she was appointed Director of Keystone Tourist Association, which arranged shopping and business appointments abroad. She was the only female on the board.

Morgan visited Tredegar House when it was a Catholic convent school, having been sold by Evan Morgan's cousin, John Morgan, in lieu of death-duties in 1951. During one of the school's annual fetes in the 1960s, Morgan was found walking around the lake by headmistress, Sister Pauline, who invited her to tea in the house. When Tredegar House was bought by Newport Council in 1973, Morgan helped curators David Beevers and David Freeman in the restoration of the property by corresponding with them regarding the layout of the rooms during her residence. She also provided information on her ex-husband. In correspondence regarding Evan Morgan, she stated "My husband – who was an eccentric – used to have great flights of fancy at times, and I never knew what was fact or fiction."

Morgan died of heart failure on 19 January 1998 at her home in Guernsey, aged 82. An obituary in the South Wales Echo included a message from the staff at Tredegar House, stating that even after her annulment, "she remained in contact by writing to staff. Everyone at the house is saddened by her death." Her funeral took place on 27 January 1998 at Folum Chapel and Crematorium.
