= Constance Ashley-Cooper, Countess of Shaftesbury =

English noblewoman

The Right Honourable The Countess of Shaftesbury
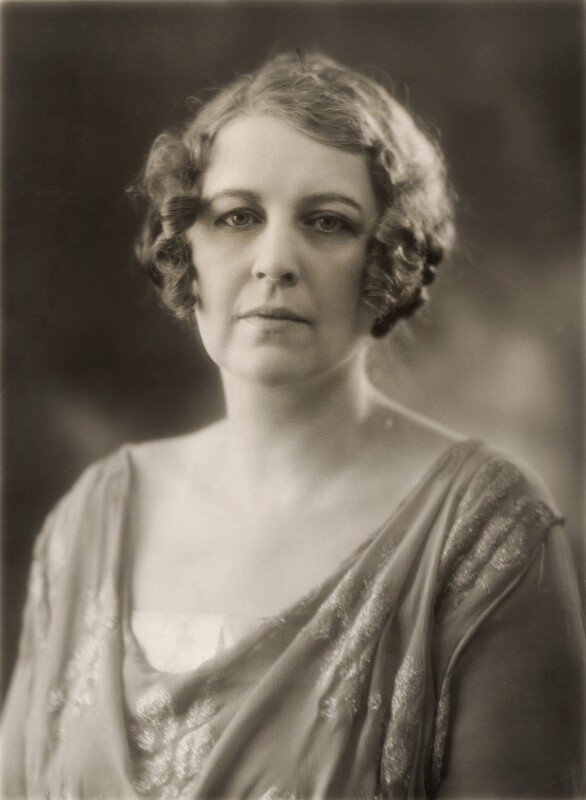
- Shaftesbury in 1923
- Born: 22 August 1875
- Died: 8 July 1957 (aged 81)
- Spouse: Anthony Ashley-Cooper, 9th Earl of Shaftesbury
- Issue: 5
- Father: Victor, Earl Grosvenor
- Mother: Lady Sibell Mary Lumley

Constance Ashley-Cooper, Countess of Shaftesbury DStJ (22 August 1875 – 8 July 1957), formerly Lady Constance Sibell Grosvenor, was the wife of the 9th Earl of Shaftesbury. She was the daughter of Victor, Earl Grosvenor, and his wife, the former Lady Sibell Mary Lumley, daughter of the 9th Earl of Scarbrough. Her paternal grandfather was The 1st Duke of Westminster.

She married the earl on 15 July 1899. She was invested as a Dame of Justice of the Order St. John of Jerusalem (DJStJ) and served as a Lady and Extra Lady of the Bedchamber to Queen Mary, wife of King George V, between 1906 and 1953.

The earl and countess had five children:

- Major Anthony Ashley-Cooper, Lord Ashley (4 October 1900 – 8 March 1947).
- Lady Mary Sibell Ashley-Cooper (3 October 1902 – 2 August 1936), who married The 3rd Baron Alington.
- Lady Dorothea Louise Harriet Ashley-Cooper (29 April 1907 – 1987), who married The 1st Viscount Head.
- Lady Lettice Mildred Ashley-Cooper (12 February 1911 – 1990), Flight Officer, W.A.A.F.; European War 1939–45 (despatches)
- Major Hon. Anthony John Percy Hugh Michael Ashley-Cooper (5 October 1915 – 1986), who married Julian Petherick and had four daughters.

One of the homes of the earl and countess was Belfast Castle, which had been built in the 1860s for the 3rd Marquess of Donegall, the earl's maternal grandfather. However, the couple mainly lived on their English estate and spent no time in Belfast after the Partition of Ireland. In 1934, they presented the castle to the city of Belfast. The Chapel of the Resurrection, originally intended as a family mausoleum, was presented to the Church of Ireland, and the remainder of the grounds were sold for housing.

Photographs of the countess by Bassano Ltd are held by the National Portrait Gallery.
