= Constance Marten and Mark Gordon =

2023 police search for British couple

Disappearance of Constance Marten and Mark Gordon
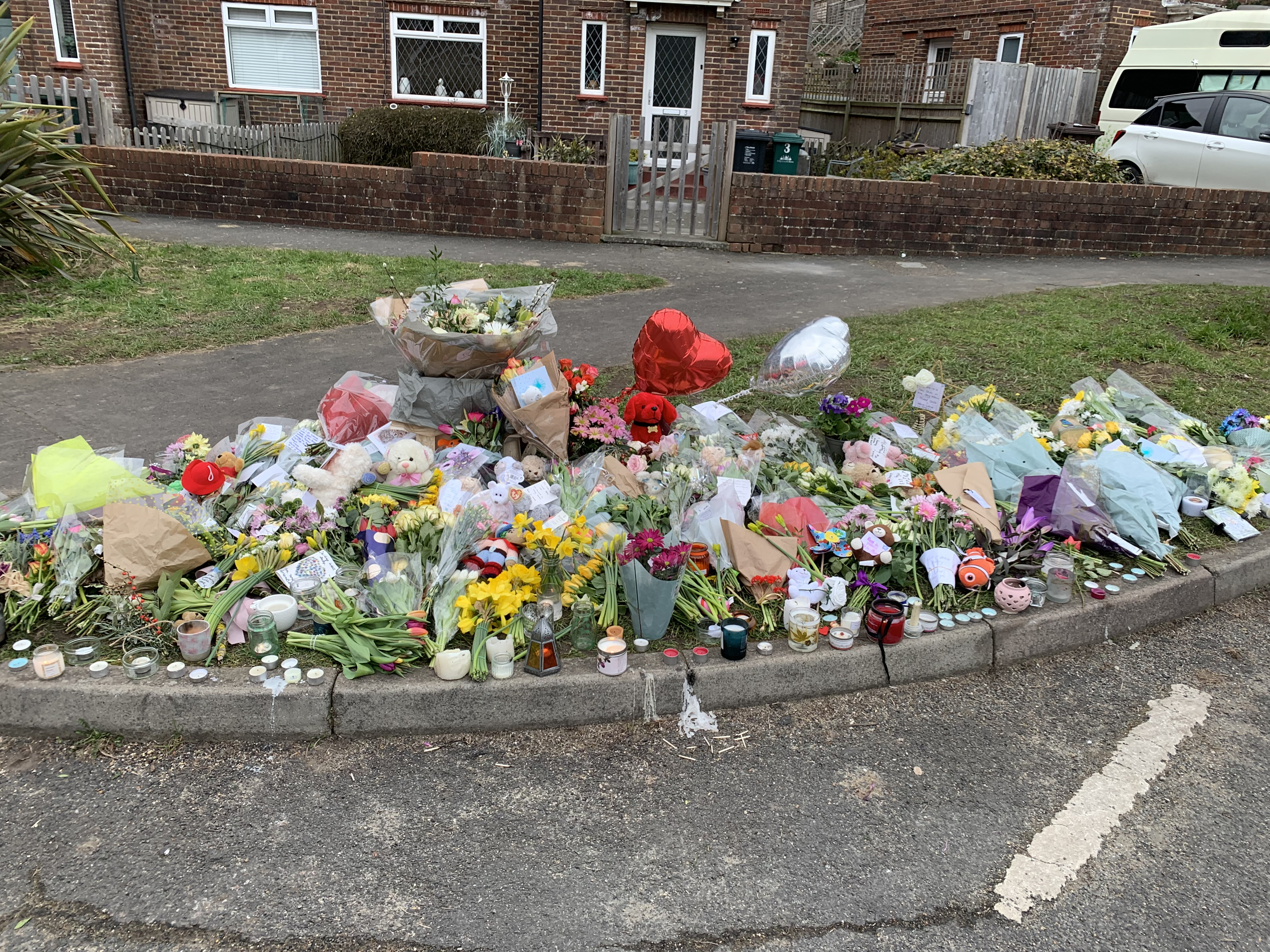
- The memorial made by locals in tribute to the deceased baby.
- Date: 5 January – 1 March 2023
- Duration: 55 days
- Location: Bolton and Brighton, England
- Deaths: 1
- Arrests: 2
- Suspects: Constance Marten; Mark Gordon
- Charges: Manslaughter by gross negligence, child cruelty, concealing the birth of a child, perverting the course of justice
- Trial: 26 January – 19 June 2024; 10 March – 14 July 2025 (retrial)
- Verdict: Guilty
- Convictions: 14 years (Marten); 14 years plus 4 years on extended licence (Gordon)
- Sentence: Imprisonment

Constance Marten and Mark Gordon are a couple who disappeared between 5 January 2023, when their burning car was found abandoned near Bolton, and the day of their arrest on 27 February 2023, in Brighton. Their disappearance coincided with the birth of their daughter. When the couple were subsequently arrested, they were not with their baby, triggering a police search involving over 200 officers across an area of around 90 sq mi (230 km^{2}) extending from Brighton to Newhaven.

On 1 March 2023, the child's body was discovered in a shopping bag inside an allotment shed, near to where the couple had been apprehended. After two trials, Marten and Gordon were convicted of causing the child's death through gross negligence.

== Background ==
Constance Marten was born into a wealthy family in 1987, and was privately educated at St Mary's School, Shaftesbury. She studied Arabic at the University of Leeds and then worked for Al Jazeera. Her parents are Napier Marten and Virginie de Selliers, and she has three brothers. She grew up in Crichel House in Dorset, and when she was about nine years old, her father abandoned his family and assets, and later resurfaced in Australia. She became estranged from her family around 2012. She had met Gordon in a London incense shop around 2014, and they became friends while she attended East 15 Acting School. In 2016, while travelling in Peru, Marten and Gordon were married in a ceremony that is not legally recognised in the UK. She became a beneficiary of her grandmother's will, receiving payments from the Sturt Family trust fund, which were paid into her account from private bank Hoares. However, funds to her were often paid sporadically into her private bank account, until she reminded the trustees that "they had a duty of care" towards her and to maintain her in a comparable manner to her siblings. Marten made claims that the trust had failed to provide her with a home.

Mark Gordon was born in Birmingham, West Midlands in 1974, and moved to Florida, United States, with his mother when he was young. In 1989, at the age of 14, he broke into a neighbour's property and raped her at knifepoint. Less than a month later, Gordon broke into another nearby home to attempt a robbery and when he found an occupant there, he beat the man with a shovel that he had brought with him.

He confessed to the police without legal advice or adult supervision. Despite being a minor, he was tried as an adult. He was advised to plead guilty to "one count of armed kidnapping, four separate counts of armed sexual battery and one count of burglary with a deadly weapon". He served 20 years of his 40-year sentence in prison before being deported back to the UK in 2010, still protesting his innocence.

Clair Wills, writing for the London Review of Books, describes the likely causes of Marten and Gordon's distrust of the authorities and of Marten's family: They had had four children taken into foster care, where one was physically abused. Gordon himself had been sexually abused at a public nursery in Birmingham when four years old. Marten's father had started the process by which social services took her children away. Her mother had offered to look after the two older children, before changing her mind. Private investigators had followed Marten for both sides of her family.

== Search ==
The couple were sought by police from 5 January 2023, onwards, when their Peugeot 206 car was found abandoned and on fire next to the M61 motorway in Bolton, Greater Manchester. Evidence was discovered that Marten had given birth several days before. The couple asked a passing motorist to take them, and their baby, to the nearest services. They then travelled by taxis to Liverpool, then Harwich in Essex, then London and finally to Brighton on 8 January. More than 100 officers of the Metropolitan Police were involved in the initial search, assisted by the National Crime Agency.

After the couple were found without their baby on 27 February, an extensive search encompassing around 90 sq mi (230 km^{2}) of land from Brighton to Newhaven involving over 200 officers, helicopters, sniffer dogs, drones and thermal cameras took place. A baby's remains were found about 48 hours after the search began, having been wrapped in a plastic bag and hidden inside a shed on an allotment.

== Arrest ==
The couple were found and arrested in Hollingdean, Brighton, on 27 February 2023. They refused to respond to repeated questioning concerning the location of their missing child.

On 1 March, remains of the baby (referred to legally as 'Baby A'), were discovered. It is believed she died weeks earlier on 9 January but the cause of death could not be ascertained. It was disclosed on 3 March that the child's body, still wearing a dirty nappy had been wrapped in a Lidl plastic bag, mixed with soil and empty beer can, and hidden inside a shed on an allotment near to where the couple were arrested.

On 3 March, the couple appeared before Crawley Magistrates' Court, charged with gross negligence manslaughter, concealing the birth of a child and perverting the course of justice. During the court appearance the baby's name was revealed to be Victoria, but was subsequently referred to only as "Baby A". The couple were remanded in custody, pending their further appearance at Central London's Old Bailey on 31 March 2023.

== Old Bailey trial ==
The accused couple appeared in the Old Bailey dock in early January 2024. They denied all charges relating to the death of Baby A contained within the charges presented to the court by the prosecution. The judge, Mark Lucraft KC, ordered the selection and swearing in of the jury. The trial commenced on 26 January 2024.

The Telegraph reported that "The couple are accused of concealing the birth of a child, cruelty to a person under 16, causing or allowing the death of a child, manslaughter by gross negligence and perverting the course of justice."

The jury were shown photographs of partly destroyed baby clothes and belongings on 31 January. On 27 February, the court heard evidence from social services about the sleep dangers that Marten was informed of twice, in relation to her new born baby.

Giving evidence in her defence, on 7 March, Marten was asked if she had ever been cruel. She replied that she "did nothing but show her love" to her daughter, adding that she had given her daughter "the best that any mother would". She said she felt "intense grief" after she awoke to find the lifeless child tucked inside her jacket. Her partner and co-defendant, Mark Gordon had earlier "changed his mind" about giving evidence and was not called by his barrister John Femi-Ola KC to defend himself under oath.

Giving further evidence on 8 March, Marten said she felt responsible for falling asleep on the baby, "If that is what happened" she explained to the court, "I had to escape my family as my family are extremely oppressive and bigoted and they would not allow me to have children with my husband and they would do anything to erase that child from the family line." Marten concluded her defence evidence on 25 March, by explaining that initially she and Gordon had lied to the police about the circumstance of their daughter's death, scared that they would be blamed and that the charges would "pile up on them".

The defence team called Professor Peter Fleming, an expert in infant health and developmental physiology at the University of Bristol. In his testimony to the jury, he stated, "I have seen no evidence of hypothermia as a cause of death." Questioned on the age of the child at death, which the prosecution had placed at eight weeks, and having assessed the child's foot size, Fleming responded: "All the pointers suggest to me that she was much younger. The best fit is that she was two or three weeks [old]." After 73 hours of deliberations, the jury failed to reach a verdict and were discharged on 19 June 2024.

On 26 June 2024, following the lifting of legal restrictions, it was reported that Marten and Gordon had been found guilty of concealing the birth of a child and perverting the course of justice. The jury had been unable to reach a verdict on the other charges. The prosecution said it would seek a retrial, and Judge Mark Lucraft KC said it would probably be scheduled for March 2025, and that the defendants should remain in custody.

The retrial began on 10 March 2025, where it was revealed that Marten and Gordon had four previous children who had been put into care. On 14 July, both Marten and Gordon were found guilty of manslaughter by gross negligence. It was later revealed that the defendants went to extraordinary lengths to try and sabotage their retrial, including refusing to turn up to court, talking to each other during proceedings, and replacing multiple barristers. Marten had a total of 14 barristers who represented her at some point during the process. Gordon ultimately represented himself in the court proceedings and used his opportunity to cross-question Marten on their joint-parenting history.

On 15 September 2025, Marten and Gordon were both sentenced by Judge Mark Lucraft KC to 14 years imprisonment, ruling that they would serve two-thirds of their sentence in custody. Gordon was further ordered to serve an additional four years on extended licence, due to his violent past.

== Reactions ==
On 2 March 2023 at 6 pm, a candlelight vigil was held for Baby A at St Mary Magdalene's Church in Coldean, Brighton.

A spontaneous memorial was made on the corner between Stanmer Villas and Golf Drive, near to where the deceased baby was found.

== See also ==
- List of solved missing person cases (2020s)
