= Crichel Down affair =

1954 British political scandal

The Crichel Down affair was a British political scandal of 1954, with a subsequent effect and notoriety. The Crichel Down Rules are guidelines applying to compulsory purchase drawn up in the light of the affair.

== Crichel Down land ==
The case concerned 725 acres (293 ha) of agricultural land at Crichel Down, near Long Crichel, Dorset, 328 acres of the land was part of the estate of Crichel House, owned by the 3rd Baron Alington. The land was purchased compulsorily in 1938 by the Air Ministry for use for bombing practice by the Royal Air Force. The purchase price when it was requisitioned was £12,006.

In 1940, Lord Alington died on active service in the RAF, and the Crichel estate passed in trust to his only child, Mary Anna Sturt (then aged 11), who married Commander Toby Marten in 1949.

In 1950 the land (then valued at £21,000) was handed over to the Ministry of Agriculture who vastly increased the price of the land beyond the amount the original owners could afford (£32,000) and leased it.

== Aftermath ==
In 1949, Toby and Mary Marten (daughter of the third Lord Alington), the owners of the Crichel estate, began a campaign for the government's promise to be kept, by a return sale of the land. They gained a public inquiry conducted by Sir Andrew Clark QC whose report was damning about actions in the case taken by those acting for the government. Archive material later released caused some shift in interpretation. In 1954, the minister responsible, Thomas Dugdale, announced that Marten could buy the Crichel estate part of the land back, and told the House of Commons he was resigning.

The resignation of Dugdale has been taken as a precedent on ministerial responsibility, even though the doctrine supposed to arise from the affair is only partially supported by the details; it was later suggested that he resigned because he supported the civil servants' actions and disagreed with the government accepting the inquiry's conclusions. Lord Carrington, Dugdale's junior minister, offered his resignation but was told to stay on. Carrington later resigned as Foreign Secretary in the aftermath of the 1982 Argentine invasion of the Falkland Islands, an example of the principle of ministerial responsibility. In 1959, Dugdale was raised to the peerage as Baron Crathorne.

Crichel had another fight against authorities in the 1990s when Commander Marten objected to plans to redevelop a former paper mill the estate had sold to the local council in the mid-1950s. A fictional version of the affair was used in an episode of Foyle's War broadcast on ITV on 7 April 2013, which examined the conflict between "the greater good of the State" and natural justice as it affects government and the security services. The Crichel Down affair is also mentioned in The Late Scholar, a detective novel by Jill Paton Walsh.

== Analysis ==
In 2002 Roger Gibbard wrote,

In the history of modern parliament, the Crichel Down affair takes on momentous significance, and has been described as a 'political bombshell'. The public inquiry into the Crichel Down events revealed a catalogue of ineptitude and maladministration and resulted directly in the resignation of the Secretary of State for Agriculture (Sir Thomas Dugdale), then a senior cabinet position, and was the first case of Ministerial resignation since 1917. Whilst the underlying case was, in the scale of things, trivial, involving the transfer of some seven hundred acres of mediocre agricultural land in Dorset, the ramifications for subsequent government procedure have been enormous, and it is regarded as one of the key events leading to the creation of the post of Ombudsman. Crichel Down was probably the first instance of close and very public scrutiny being directed at a Minister of the Crown in the execution of his duties.

== See also ==
- Crichel Down Rules

== Bibliography ==
- Brown, R. Douglas (1955), The Battle of Crichel Down: An Account of the Public Enquiry and Parliamentary Debate held as a Result of the Refusal of the Ministry of Agriculture to Return to Private Ownership land Compulsorily Acquired. With portraits (1st ed.), London: Bodley Head, OCLC 316104091
- Gibbard, R. (2002). Whose Land was it Anyway?: The Crichel Down Rules and the Sale of Public Land (PDF) (Report). Working Papers in Land Management and Development No. 2002-01. Reading: University of Reading: Department of Land Management and Development. OCLC 1114822377.
- Nicholson, I. (1986), The Mystery of Crichel Down (1st ed.), Oxford: Oxford University Press, ISBN 978-0-19-827492-6
