= Kilinchi =

Kilinchi Килинчи
- Selo
- Location within Astrakhan Oblast Location within Russia
- Coordinates: 46°17′N 48°14′E
- Country: Russia
- Region: Astrakhan Oblast
- District: Privolzhsky District
- Time zone: UTC+4:00

Kilinchi (Russian: Килинчи, Nogai: Келеши) is a rural locality (a selo) and the administrative center of Kilinchinsky Selsoviet, Privolzhsky District, Astrakhan Oblast, Russia. The population was 3,137 as of 2010. There are 90 streets.

== Geography ==
Kilinchi is located 19 km southeast of Nachalovo (the district's administrative centre) by road. Nachalo is the nearest rural locality.
