= Anna Antonenko-Lukonina =

Russian actress

Anna Vasilyevna Antonenko-Lukonina (Russian: Анна Васильевна Антоненко-Луконина; born January 6, 1937) is a Soviet and Russian actress, People's Artist of Russia (2007).

== Biography ==
Anna Antonenko-Lukonina was born on January 6, 1937. In 1959, she completed GITIS (Iosif Raevski's course).

In 1959–1960, she worked in the Gorky District Drama Theater (Arzamas-16), later known as the Sarov Drama Theater.

She was married to a Russian poet Mikhail Lukonin (1918–1976).

In 1960, she played in the Malaya Bronnaya Theater in Moscow.

== Selected filmography ==
- Investigation Held by ZnaToKi, as Irina Sergeevna Maslova (TV Series, 1971)
- Long Farewell, as Anna Vasilievna (2004)
- The New Year's Rate Plan, as elderly passenger (2008)
