= Vladimir G. Lukonin =

Russian archaeologist and historian (1932–1984)

Vladimir Grigoryevich Lukonin (Russian: Владимир Григорьевич Луконин; 21 January 1932 - 10 September 1984) was a Russian historian and archaeologist, specialising in the history and archaeology of ancient Iran.

== Early life and education ==
Lukonin was born in Leningrad on 21 January 1932; his mother was a physician and his father an army general. From 1941 to 1944 he was evacuated to Samarkand with his mother and younger brother. He studied at the Oriental faculty of the Leningrad State University, and did postgraduate work at the Hermitage Museum. His doctoral thesis (1961) was "Iran in the 3rd-4th Centuries. Formation of the Sasanian State and Artifacts of the Official Art" and he was awarded a D.Litt. in 1972 for a thesis on "Early Sasanian Iran. Some Problems of History and Culture".

== Career ==
Lukonin worked on archaeological excavations in Central Asia each year from 1951 to 1963, and in 1957 took up a post in the Oriental department of the Hermitage Museum. He became head of that department in 1965 and remained in post until his death on 10 September 1984.

== Recognitions ==
In 1988, Mary Anna Marten established the Ancient Persia Fund at the British Museum in his honour.

The British Museum held two seminars in his memory: Early Mesopotamia and Iran: contact and conflict, 3500-1600 BC and Later Mesopotamia and Iran: tribes and empires, 1600-539 BC .

== Selected publications ==
- Dandamaev, M. A.; Lukonin, Vladimir G. (1989). The culture and social institutions of ancient Iran (English edition by Philip L. Kohl ed.). Cambridge: Cambridge University Press. ISBN 0521321077.
- Lukonin, Vladimir Grigorévich (1971). Persia II : from the Seleucids to the Sassanids. London: Barrie & Jenkins. ISBN 021465320X.
