= Anthony Ashley-Cooper, 9th Earl of Shaftesbury =

English peer, soldier and public servant

Brigadier-General The Right Honourable The Earl of Shaftesbury KP GCVO CBE PC
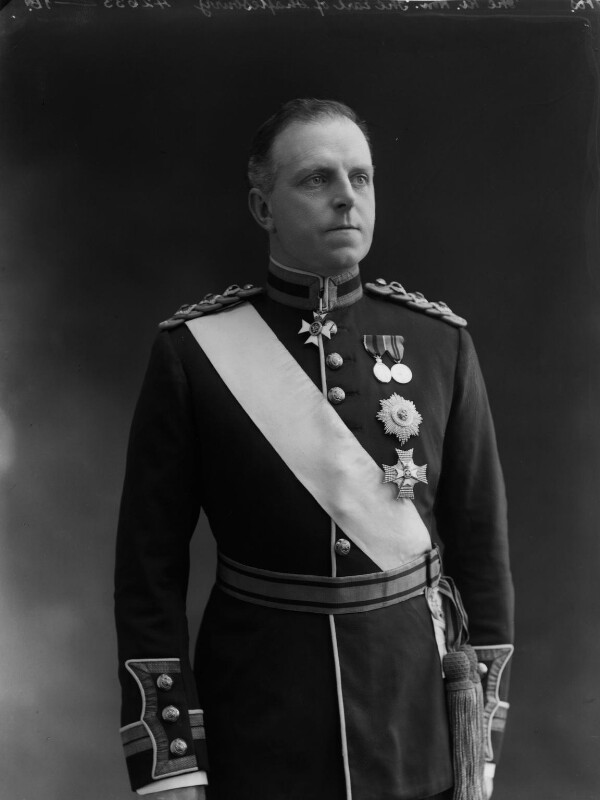
- Tenure: 13 April 1886 – 25 March 1961
- Predecessor: Anthony Ashley-Cooper, 8th Earl of Shaftesbury
- Successor: Anthony Ashley-Cooper, 10th Earl of Shaftesbury
- Other titles: Baron Ashley of Wimborne St Giles, Baron Cooper of Pawlett
- Known for: Philanthropy
- Years active: 1886–1961
- Born: Anthony Ashley-Cooper; 31 August 1869; England
- Died: 25 March 1961 (aged 91); England
- Buried: Parish Church at Wimborne St Giles
- Residence: Nice, France; St Giles House in Wimborne St Giles
- Locality: Nice, France; Dorset, England; Northern Ireland
- Wars and battles: First World War 1914–18
- Offices: Lord Steward; Lord Chamberlain; Lord Mayor of Belfast
- Spouse: Lady Constance Sibell Grosvenor (1899–1957)
- Issue: Anthony Ashley-Cooper, Lord Ashley; Mary Sturt, Baroness Alington; Dorothea Head, Viscountess Head. Lady Lettice Ashley-Cooper; Major Hon Anthony John Percy Hugh Michael Ashley-Cooper
- Parents: Anthony Ashley-Cooper, 8th Earl of Shaftesbury; Lady Harriet Augusta Anna Seymourina Chichester

Anthony Ashley-Cooper, 9th Earl of Shaftesbury KP GCVO CBE PC (31 August 1869 – 25 March 1961) was an English peer, soldier, and public servant. He was the son of the 8th Earl of Shaftesbury and Lady Harriet Augusta Anna Seymourina Chichester (1836 – 14 April 1898), the daughter of the 3rd Marquess of Donegall and Lady Harriet Anne Butler. He inherited the earldom at age 15.

== Military career ==
Lord Shaftesbury was commissioned a second lieutenant in the 10th Hussars in 1890, promoted to lieutenant in 1891, and to captain in 1898. From 1895–1899 he served as an Aide-de-camp to the Governor of Victoria. He retired from the regular army in 1899, but continued as a captain of the reserve in the Dorset Imperial Yeomanry. On 12 March 1902 he was promoted to lieutenant-colonel commanding the North of Ireland Imperial Yeomanry. On 1 January 1913 he was promoted colonel in the Territorial Force and appointed to command the 1st South Western Mounted Brigade; he was granted the temporary rank of brigadier-general on the outbreak of war in 1914. Shaftesbury served through the First World War from 1914 to 1918, and relinquished his appointment as a brigade commander on 1 March 1919, when he was granted the honorary rank of brigadier-general.

== Political, civic and court offices ==
Lord Shaftesbury was Lord Lieutenant of Belfast from 1904 to 1911, Lord Lieutenant of Antrim from 1911 to 1916, and Lord Lieutenant of Dorset from 1916 to 1952. He was Lord Mayor of Belfast 1907, and Chancellor of Queen's University, Belfast 1909–1923.

At the Court, Lord Shaftesbury served as Chamberlain to Mary of Teck as Princess of Wales 1901–1910 and as Lord Chamberlain to her as Queen of the United Kingdom 1910–1922. That year he was appointed Lord Steward of the Household, serving until 1936.

Lord Shaftesbury served as President of the Salisbury Diocesan Guild of Ringers from 1919–1960, the year before his death.

== Family life ==
On 15 July 1899, the 9th Earl of Shaftesbury married Lady Constance Sibell Grosvenor (22 August 1875 – 8 July 1957), the daughter of Victor Alexander Grosvenor, styled Earl Grosvenor (son and heir of Hugh Lupus Grosvenor, 1st Duke of Westminster) and his wife, Lady Sibell Mary Lumley, daughter of Richard George Lumley, 9th Earl of Scarbrough. Lady Constance was invested as a Dame of Justice of Order of St. John of Jerusalem (DJStJ) and served as a Lady and Extra Lady of the Bedchamber to Queen Mary.

The 9th Earl of Shaftesbury and his wife, Lady Constance had five children:

- Major Anthony Ashley-Cooper, Lord Ashley (4 October 1900 – 8 March 1947).
- Lady Mary Sibell Ashley-Cooper (3 October 1902 – 2 August 1936), married Napier Sturt, 3rd Baron Alington of Crichel.
- Lady Dorothea Louise Ashley-Cooper (29 April 1907 – 1987), married Antony Head, 1st Viscount Head.
- Lady Lettice Mildred Ashley-Cooper (12 February 1911 – 1990).
- Major Anthony John Percy Hugh Michael Ashley-Cooper (5 October 1915 – 1986), married Julian Petherick, by whom he had four daughters. He was regarded by many to be one of the greatest salmon anglers of the 20th century and wrote four books on the subject.

Lord Ashley was heir apparent to the earldom, scheduled to inherit upon the death of his father. However, at age 46, Ashley died unexpectedly of heart disease before succession. At that time, his son, Anthony Ashley-Cooper, became heir apparent, inheriting the earldom in 1961 upon the death of his grandfather.

== Philanthropy and community service ==
=== Bryanston School ===
In 1928, Lord Shaftesbury provided a financial grant to help establish Bryanston School a co-educational independent boarding school in Blandford, Dorset, England, near the village of Bryanston.

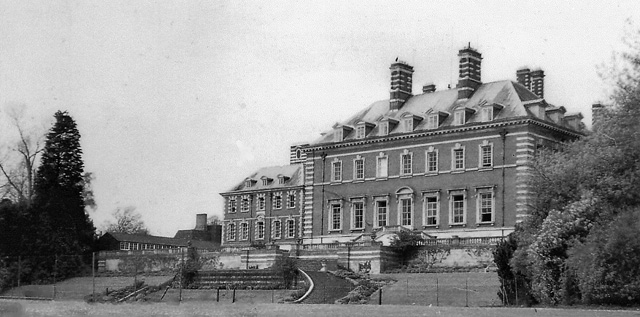
Bryanston School in Dorset

It was founded by J. G. Jeffreys who, with financial backing from the earl, paid £35,000 for Bryanston House and its 450 acres (1.8 km^{2}) of immediate grounds. The Earl served as the school's first Chairman of the Governors.

=== Belfast Castle ===
The 9th Earl of Shaftesbury presented Belfast Castle to the City of Belfast in 1934. In 1978, Belfast City Council began a major refurbishment over a period of ten years at a cost of over two million pounds. The architect was the Hewitt and Haslam Partnership. The building officially re-opened to the public on 11 November 1988.

== Honours ==
- 1901: Provincial Grand Master of the Provincial Grand Lodge of Antrim (1901–1921)
- 1902: Provincial Grand Master of Freemasons in Dorset
- 1906: Knight Commander of the Royal Victorian Order (KCVO)
- 1911: Knight of the Order of St Patrick (KP) (At his death, he was the last living non-royal member of the Order of St. Patrick.)
- 1919: Commander of the Order of the British Empire (CBE)
- 1920: Younger Brother of the Trinity House
- 1922: Privy Counsellor
- 1924: Knight Grand Cross of the Royal Victorian Order (GCVO)

== Death and burial ==
The 9th Earl of Shaftesbury died in 1961 aged 91. He was buried in the Parish Church at Wimborne St Giles near the family estate. The earl's titles passed to his 22-year-old grandson, Anthony Ashley-Cooper.

The 9th Earl had carefully arranged financial matters on the Shaftesbury Estate so that his heirs would avoid death duties. When the earl died in 1961, his grandson inherited the family's 17th-century home and large estate in Dorset, several other properties and a collection of art, antiques, and other valuables. By the 1990s the 10th Earl's wealth was said to be in the "low millions".

Civic offices
Preceded by Daniel Dixon	Lord Mayor of Belfast; 1907–1908	Succeeded by Robert Anderson
Political offices
Preceded by The Viscount Farquhar	Lord Steward; 1922–1936	Succeeded by The Duke of Sutherland
Court offices
New title	Lord Chamberlain to The Princess of Wales, later Queen Mary; 1901–1922	Succeeded by The Marquess of Anglesey
Honorary titles
Preceded by The Marquess of Londonderry	Lord Lieutenant of Belfast; 1904–1911	Succeeded by The Lord Pirrie
Preceded by Sir Francis Workman-Macnaghten, Bt	Lord Lieutenant of Antrim; 1911–1916	Succeeded by The Viscount Massereene
Preceded by John Mount Batten	Lord Lieutenant of Dorset; 1916–1952	Succeeded by The Lord Digby
Peerage of England
Preceded by Anthony Ashley-Cooper	Earl of Shaftesbury; 1886–1961	Succeeded by Anthony Ashley-Cooper
