= Francis Arthur Marten =

Royal Navy Vice-Admiral (1879–1950)

Vice-Admiral Sir Francis Arthur Marten, KBE, CB, CMG, CVO (7 January, 1879 – 14 March, 1950) was a Royal Navy officer who saw action in both world wars.

== Biography ==
The son of G. N. Marten, of Marshals Wick, St Albans, Francis Marten entered the Britannia as a cadet in July 1892, and went to sea as a midshipman two years later. He was promoted to lieutenant in 1900, appointed to the royal yacht HMY Victoria and Albert in 1909, and was promoted to commander in 1911. From 1912 to 1914, he was the executive officer of the battleship HMS St Vincent.

He was appointed a Companion of the Order of the Bath (CB) in the 1923 Birthday Honours.

During the Second World War, Martin returned to active service as convoy commodore from 1940 to 1944. For his service, he was mentioned in despatches and appointed an additional Knight Commander of the Order of the British Empire in 1944.
