= Crichel House =

Grade I listed building in Dorset, England

Coordinates: 50.8744°N 2.0095°W

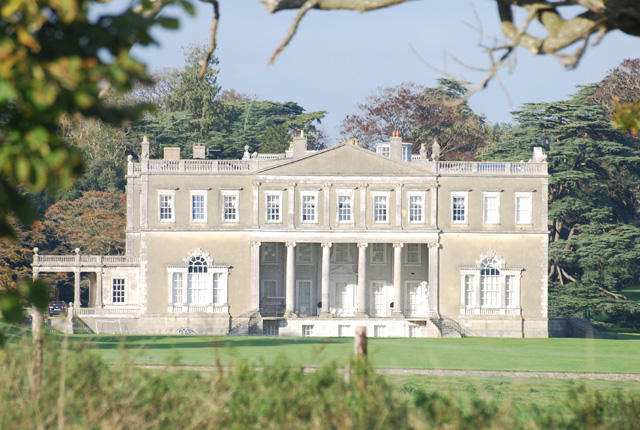
Crichel House

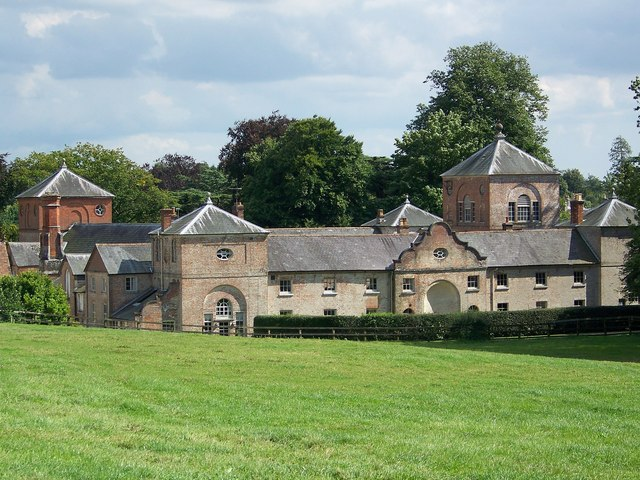
Crichel House Farm

Crichel House is a Grade I listed Classical Revival country house near the village of Moor Crichel in Dorset, England. Originally built in the 16th century, it was rebuilt following a fire in the 18th century, then remodelled in both the 19th and 20th centuries. The house has an entrance designed by Thomas Hopper and interiors by James Wyatt. It is surrounded by 400 acres (160 hectares) of parkland, which includes a crescent-shaped lake covering 50 acres (20 hectares). The parkland is Grade II listed in the National Register of Historic Parks and Gardens.

== History ==
The original Tudor house, owned by the Napier family, was largely destroyed in an accidental fire in 1742 and was rebuilt in English Baroque style for Sir William Napier by John Bastard of Blandford and Francis Cartwright, probably the contractor. Humphrey Sturt, of Horton, acquired the estate in 1765 on his marriage with Diana, the aunt and heir of Sir Gerard Napier, the 6th and last baronet, and with the collaboration of the Bastard family extensively remodelled the house in 1771–73, extending it and adding an Ionic portico on the south front. The new interiors, including a new double-height entrance hall with an expanded staircase, were designed by James Wyatt (1772–80), with painted decor by Biagio Rebecca, chimneypieces by John Devall, and furniture by John Linnell (1778–79) and Ince and Mayhew (1768–78). The park was landscaped in the style introduced by Capability Brown, with a crescent-shaped lake and belts of trees.

On Humphrey Sturt's death in 1786, his second son, Charles, inherited Crichel and let it. His son Henry Charles Sturt commissioned a new entrance hall on the west side of the house designed by Thomas Hopper in 1831. Thomas Evans of Wimborne had exhibited designs for Crichel at the Royal Academy in 1824, but there is no indication these were used. Major alterations were then made to the house by Henry Charles' son Henry Gerard Sturt, who in 1876 became 1st Baron Alington; to designs by William Burn, the exterior was made neoclassical and a porte-cochère in Roman Doric style added to the entrance on the west façade. New wings for family and servant accommodations were added on the north side.

Beginning in 1905, Crichel was further remodelled by Henry Sturt's son Humphrey Napier Sturt, the second Baron, and his wife Lady Féodorovna, and again in the late 1920s by their son Napier Sturt, 3rd Baron Alington. The facades were returned to a more Georgian appearance, including the restoration of glazing bars in the plate glass windows, and Harold Peto designed an Italian garden.

in 1938, the Crichel estate was requisitioned by the Air Ministry for training, and the furnishings were removed from the house. In 1946 the house was let to Cranborne Chase School, a boarding independent school for girls. On the death of the 3rd Baron during active service in the Second World War, his daughter Mary Anna inherited at the age of 11; following her marriage to Toby Marten, in the Crichel Down Affair, the couple took on the Government and in 1954 won the right to buy back land bought by compulsory purchase.

Mary Anna Marten ended the lease with Cranborne Chase School in 1961 in order to make Crichel House her residence; the school relocated to New Wardour Castle, near Tisbury in Wiltshire. The house was restored under architect E.F. Tew of Bath, with demolition of the Victorian north wings. The family accommodations were placed on the top floor, and almost all the main rooms were redecorated under the supervision of the firm of Mallets. Architectural features from the Italian garden, removed shortly after the war, were used to create a sunken courtyard with balustrades. Further internal modifications were carried out in 1979–80, including the recreation of a long gallery that had been subdivided.

Mary Anna Marten died in 2010; in 2013 her son, Napier Marten, sold Crichel House and a portion of the land to the American billionaire Richard Chilton. Chilton has extensively restored the house, reinstating many elements of James Wyatt's interiors and adding furnishings.

== Crichel Down estate ==
The landscaping of the parkland for Humphrey Sturt involved moving the village of Moor Crichel a mile to the north to create the lake. Many of the villagers were moved to Witchampton. The 1850 former parish church of St Mary's, a Grade II* listed building, remains in place near the lake.

At the death of Mary Anna Marten in 2010, the Crichel Down estate comprised 7,932 acres (3,210 hectares), including four villages, St Mary's Church, a school and a cricket club, and was bequeathed to Napier Marten and his five sisters. As of January 2020 the remainder is divided between multiple holding companies, one of which appears to be an agency of the Phillimore family. The gardens have been occasionally opened to the public under the National Garden Scheme.

== Notable visitors ==
George IV stayed at Crichel House while Prince Regent. Princess Charlotte Augusta of Wales, the only child of his loveless marriage with Caroline of Brunswick, spent time at Crichel House under the care of Lady Rosslyn and Lady Ilchester.
