= Witchampton =

Village and civil parish in Dorset, England

Coordinates: 50.857°N 2.018°W

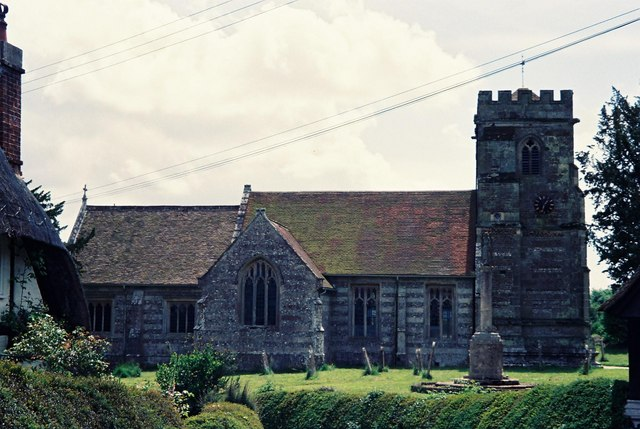
- Parish church of St Mary, St Cuthburga & All Saints

- Location within Dorset
- Population: 398
- OS grid reference: ST988064
- Civil parish: Witchampton
- Unitary authority: Dorset
- Ceremonial county: Dorset
- Region: South West
- Country: England
- Sovereign state: United Kingdom
- Post town: WIMBORNE
- Postcode district: BH21
- Dialling code: 01258
- Police: Dorset
- Fire: Dorset and Wiltshire
- Ambulance: South Western
- UK Parliament: North Dorset

Witchampton is a village and civil parish in Dorset, England, situated on the River Allen 5 miles (8 km) north of Wimborne Minster. The 2011 census recorded a population of 398.

Witchampton lies close to where the dip slope of the chalk hills of Cranborne Chase is overlain by newer deposits of London Clay. Although Witchampton is sited within the area of the chalk, where cob and thatch are the traditional building materials, the nearness of the clay has resulted in many of the older houses in the village being built from brick. The early 16th-century Abbey House contains some of the earliest brickwork in the county.

To the northeast of the village there used to be a paper mill by the river. In 1980 it was described by writer Roland Gant as a "discreet industrial oasis in an agricultural plain". It had been in operation since the early 18th century, but has now been converted to residential accommodation.

11th-century whalebone chess pieces have been found within the parish, and are some of the best surviving early English chess pieces.

== Events ==
The Witchampton Village Fete is an annual community event held in the fields adjacent to the historic Witchampton ruins. The fete serves as a local gathering, featuring a variety of activities and competitive games.

Notable attractions typically include:

A dog show open to local entrants, featuring various categories for pedigree and companion pets

An exhibition of vehicles provided by residents of the surrounding area.

A range of local vendor booths, craft displays and recreational activities typical of English rural festivals such as "Splat The Rat".
