= Napier Sturt, 3rd Baron Alington =

British peer (1896–1940)

The Right Honourable The Lord Alington
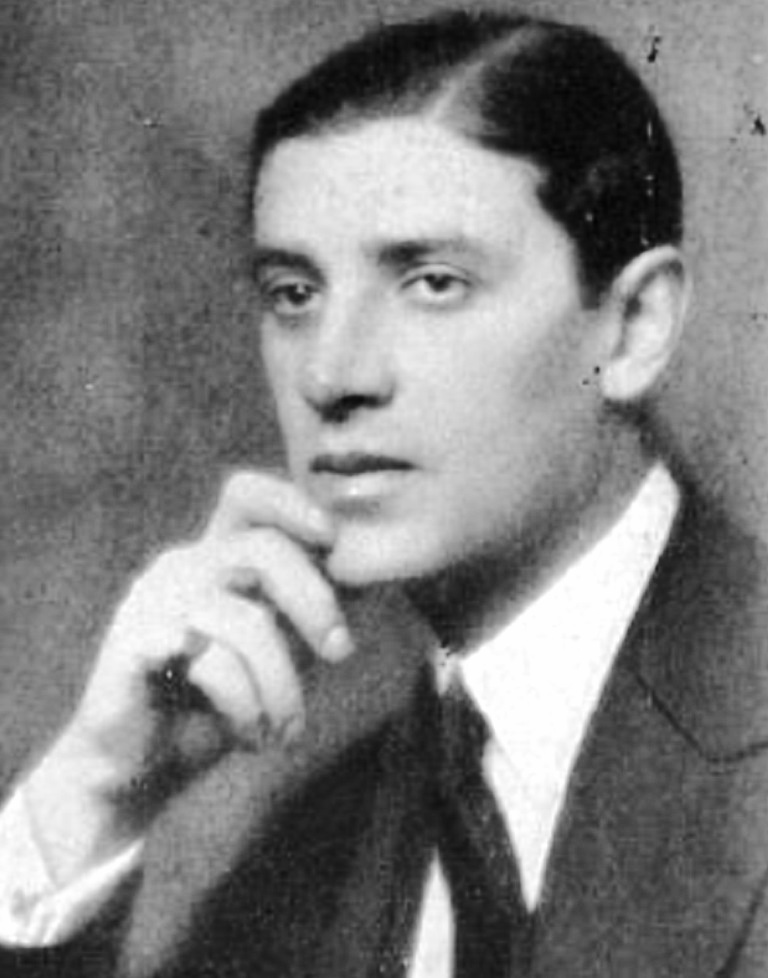
- Born: Napier George Henry Sturt; 1 November 1896; Marylebone, London, England
- Died: 17 September 1940 (aged 43); Cairo, Egypt
- Burial place: Cairo, Egypt
- Known for: Lover of Tallulah Bankhead
- Spouse: Mary Sibell Ashley-Cooper (m. 1928; died 1936)
- Children: Mary Anna Sibell Elizabeth Sturt
- Parents: Humphrey Sturt; Feodorowna Yorke
- Military career
- Allegiance: United Kingdom
- Branch: Royal Air Force
- Rank: Group captain
- Conflicts: World War I; World War II

Captain Napier George Henry Sturt, 3rd Baron Alington (1 November 1896, St. Marylebone England – 17 September 1940, Cairo Egypt ), was a British peer who succeeded to the barony on 30 July 1919, on the death of his father, Humphrey Sturt, 2nd Baron Alington. He owned Crichel House estate in Dorset. He may have been most notable for having been involved with Tallulah Bankhead in the 1920s.

He married Lady Mary Sibell Ashley-Cooper, daughter of Anthony Ashley-Cooper, 9th Earl of Shaftesbury, on 27 November 1928. They had one child, Mary Anna Sibell Elizabeth Sturt (b. 1929, d. 2010).

He was a friend of the Polish composer Karol Szymanowski, who dedicated his Songs of an infatuated Muezzin Op.42 to Alington, on their publication in 1922. Over sixty-four years after his death, two writers claimed he was bisexual.

Upon his death, having no male heir, had no male heir upon his death,the title became extinct. Crichel estate passed to his 11-year-old daughter Mary, who later married Commander George (known as Toby) Marten. They fought the government in the Crichel Down Affair and won, leading to the resignation of a minister..

== War service ==
In World War I he was a captain in the Royal Air Force. In World War II he served in the Royal Air Force Volunteer Reserve. He was commissioned on 2 July 1940 as an officer in the Administrative and Special Duties Branch and was posted to Cairo, possibly serving as a staff officer at HQ Middle East. He died on 16 September 1940, aged 43, in Cairo on active service, of a short illness after pneumonia, and was buried in the New British Protestant Cemetery, Cairo, Egypt, plot E.221-222

Peerage of the United Kingdom
Preceded by Humphrey Sturt	Baron Alington; 1919–1940	Extinct
