= Llandaff Cathedral =

Cathedral in Cardiff, Wales

- The Cathedral Church of Saints Peter and Paul with Saints Dyfrig, Teilo, and Euddogwy
- Eglwys Gadeiriol Llandaf
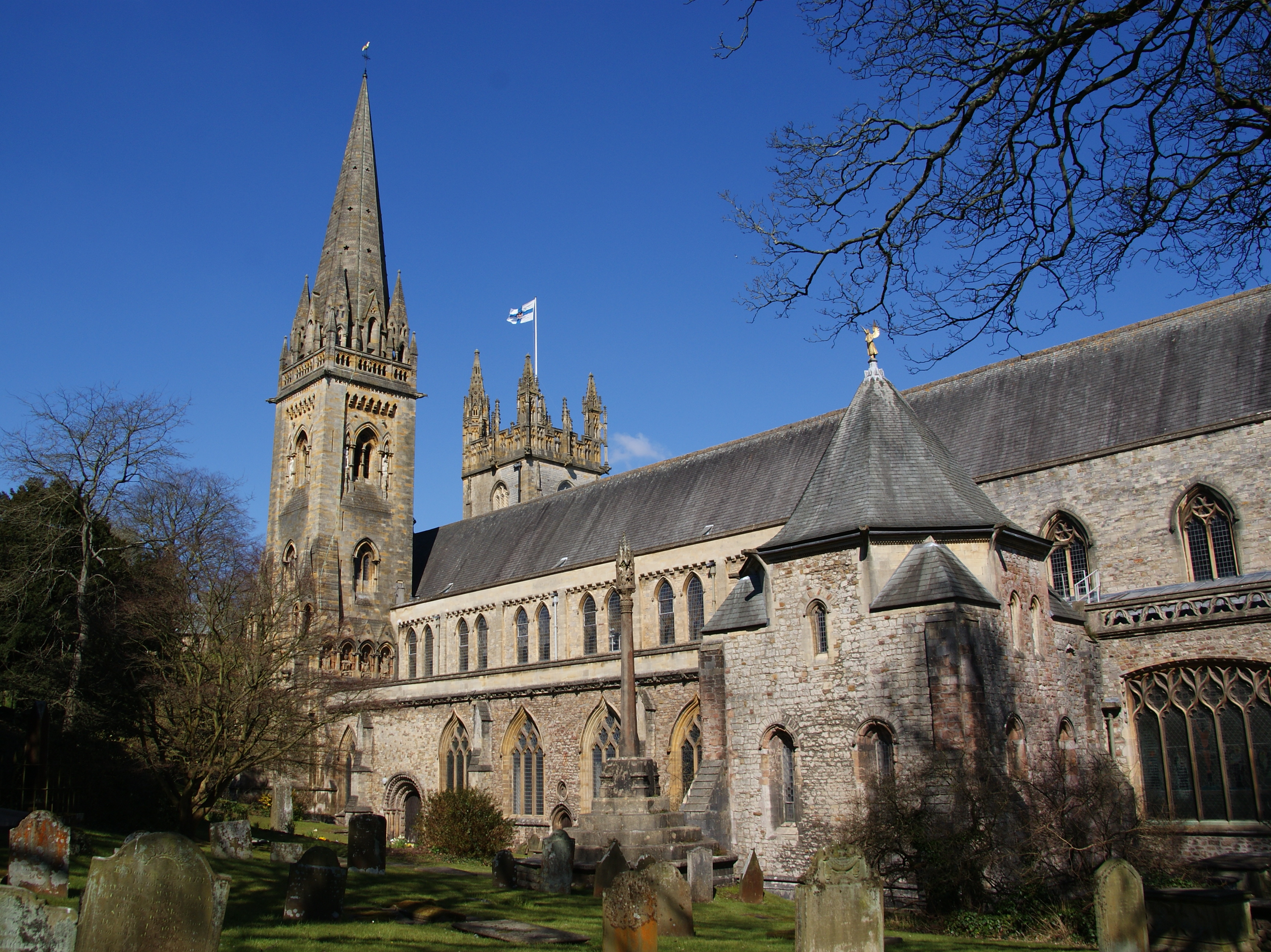

- Location within Cardiff
- 51°29′45″N 3°13′04″W
- Location: Cardiff
- Country: Wales
- Denomination: Church in Wales
- Previous denomination: Roman Catholic
- Website: www.llandaffcathedral.org.uk

History
- Status: Cathedral
- Founded: 2nd century refounded in the 5th century
- Founder(s): Lucius refounded by Saint Dyfrig

Architecture
- Functional status: Active
- Style: Medieval, Gothic

Administration
- Diocese: Llandaff

Clergy
- Bishop: Mary Stallard
- Dean: Jason Bray

Llandaff Cathedral (Welsh: Eglwys Gadeiriol Llandaf) is a Church in Wales cathedral and parish church in Llandaff, Cardiff, Wales. It is the seat of the Bishop of Llandaff, head of the Church in Wales Diocese of Llandaff. It is dedicated to Saint Peter and Saint Paul, and three Welsh saints: Dubricius (Welsh: Dyfrig), Teilo and Oudoceus (Welsh: Euddogwy). It is one of two cathedrals in Cardiff, the other being the Roman Catholic Cardiff Metropolitan Cathedral in the city centre.

The current building was constructed in the 12th century on the site of an earlier church. Severe damage was done to the church in 1400 during the rebellion of Owain Glyndŵr, during the English Civil War when it was overrun by Parliamentarian troops, and during the Great Storm of 1703. By 1717, the damage to the cathedral was so extensive that the church seriously considered the removal of the see. Following further storms in the early 1720s, work was begun in 1734 on a new cathedral designed by John Wood, the Elder, but this was never completed, and instead a major restoration by John Prichard was carried out in the 1840s and 1850s. In January 1941, during the Cardiff Blitz of the Second World War, the cathedral was severely damaged by a parachute mine that blew the roof off the nave, south aisle and chapter house. The stonework which remains from the medieval period is primarily Dundry stone from Somerset, though local blue lias constitutes most of the stonework dating from the post-Reformation period. The work done on the church since World War II is primarily of concrete and Pennant sandstone, and the roofs, of Welsh slate and lead, were added during the post-war rebuilding. In February 2007, the organ was damaged during a severe lightning strike, following which there was a successful appeal for £1.5 million for an entirely new organ.

For many years, the cathedral had the traditional Anglican choir of boys and men, and more recently a girls' choir, with the only dedicated choir school in the Church in Wales, the Cathedral School, Llandaff. The cathedral contains a number of notable tombs, including Dubricius, a 6th-century British saint who evangelised Ergyng (now Archenfield) and much of South-East Wales; Meurig ap Tewdrig, King of Gwent; Teilo, a 6th-century Welsh clergyman, church founder and saint; and many Bishops of Llandaff, from the 7th-century Oudoceus to the 19th-century Alfred Ollivant, who was bishop from 1849 to 1882.

== History ==
=== Legendary origins ===
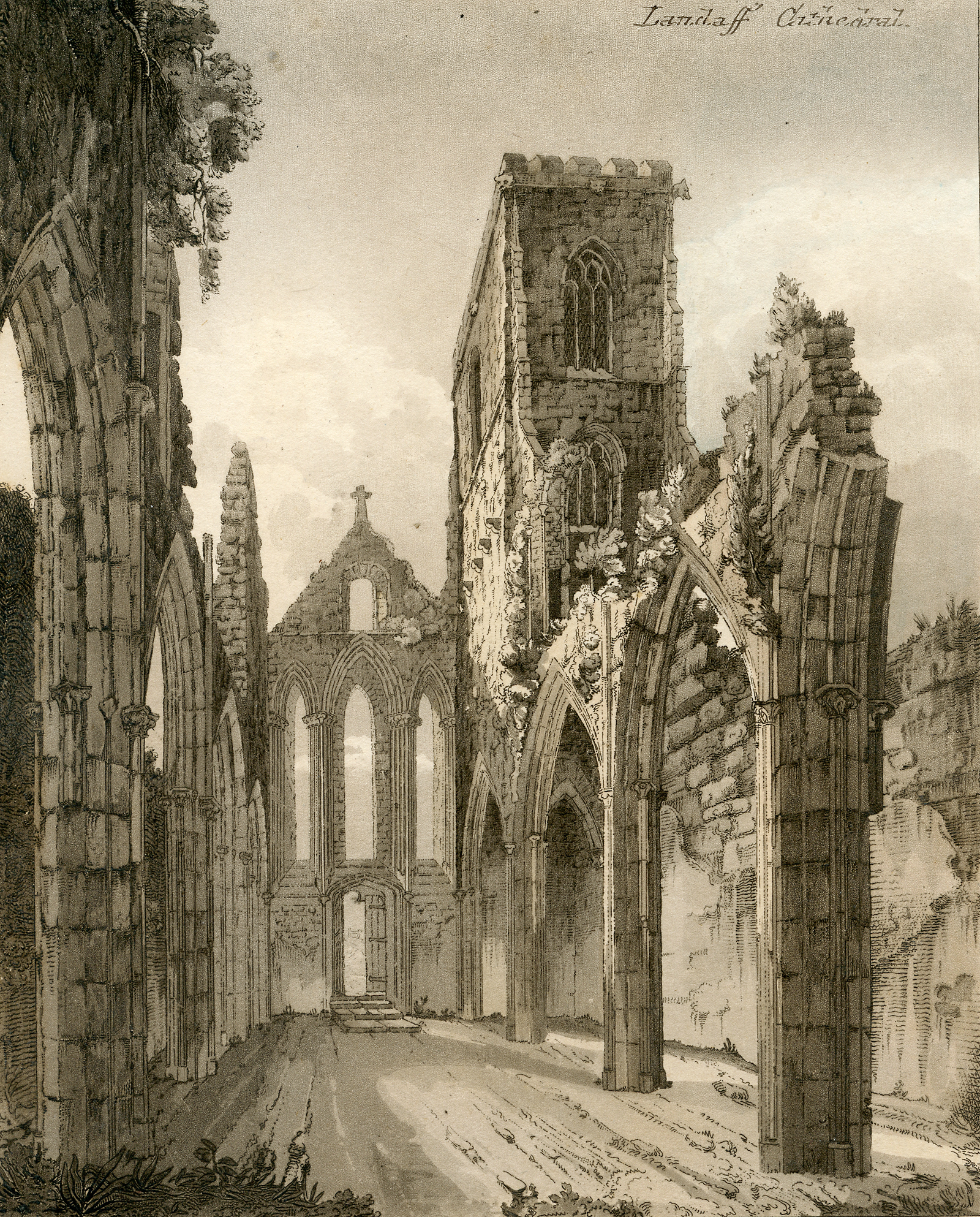
The nave after the 1723 collapse

There is common consensus that the Norman cathedral was constructed on the site of an ancient Celtic church, but there is little consensus on the original church's age, importance or size.

==== Lucius of Britain ====
Welsh tradition associates the church's founding with Lucius, the legendary 2nd-century King of the Britons and the first Christian convert in Britain. Lucius was believed to have beseeched Pope (Eleutherius) to convert him to Christianity. The Pope's response was to send a Christian mission to Britain, which would include the building of Britain's first church. The Welsh Triads relate this tradition to Llandaff, stating that Lucius "made the first Church at Llandaf, which was the first in the Isle of Britain." another triad lists "the three archbishoprics of the Isle of Britain" and states that "the first was Llandaf, of the gift of Lleirwg (Lucius), the son of Coel, the son of Cyllin, who first gave lands and civil privileges to such as first embraced the faith in Christ." Although the Lucius legend is now considered to be pseudo-history, it was recounted by Nennius, Bede and Geoffrey of Monmouth, and seems to have been widely accepted in the medieval period.

Four names are associated with the task of executing the Pope's wishes; these include the early Welsh saints Fagan, Deruvian and Elvan. Fagan is sometimes named as "the first Bishop of Llandaff" while all three became patrons of churches and villages throughout the diocese. Iolo Morgannwg also linked these early figures to Llandaff, writing extensively on this supposed early foundation. In the Iolo Manuscripts, he credits Fagan as the second Bishop of Llandaff (succeeding Dyfan, a figure Iolo conflates with Deruvian). (Note: An account in the Book of Llandaff is that in 156AD, King Lucius sent two ambassadors, Elfan and Medwy, to Pope Eleutherius asking that he be made a Christian and that his subjects might also become Christians. Both ambassadors were baptised and ordained, with Elfan being made a bishop. Both men returned to Britain where they taught and converted many in the court of King Lucius. Elfan is said to have become the first Bishop of Llandaff.)

==== Saint Dubricius ====
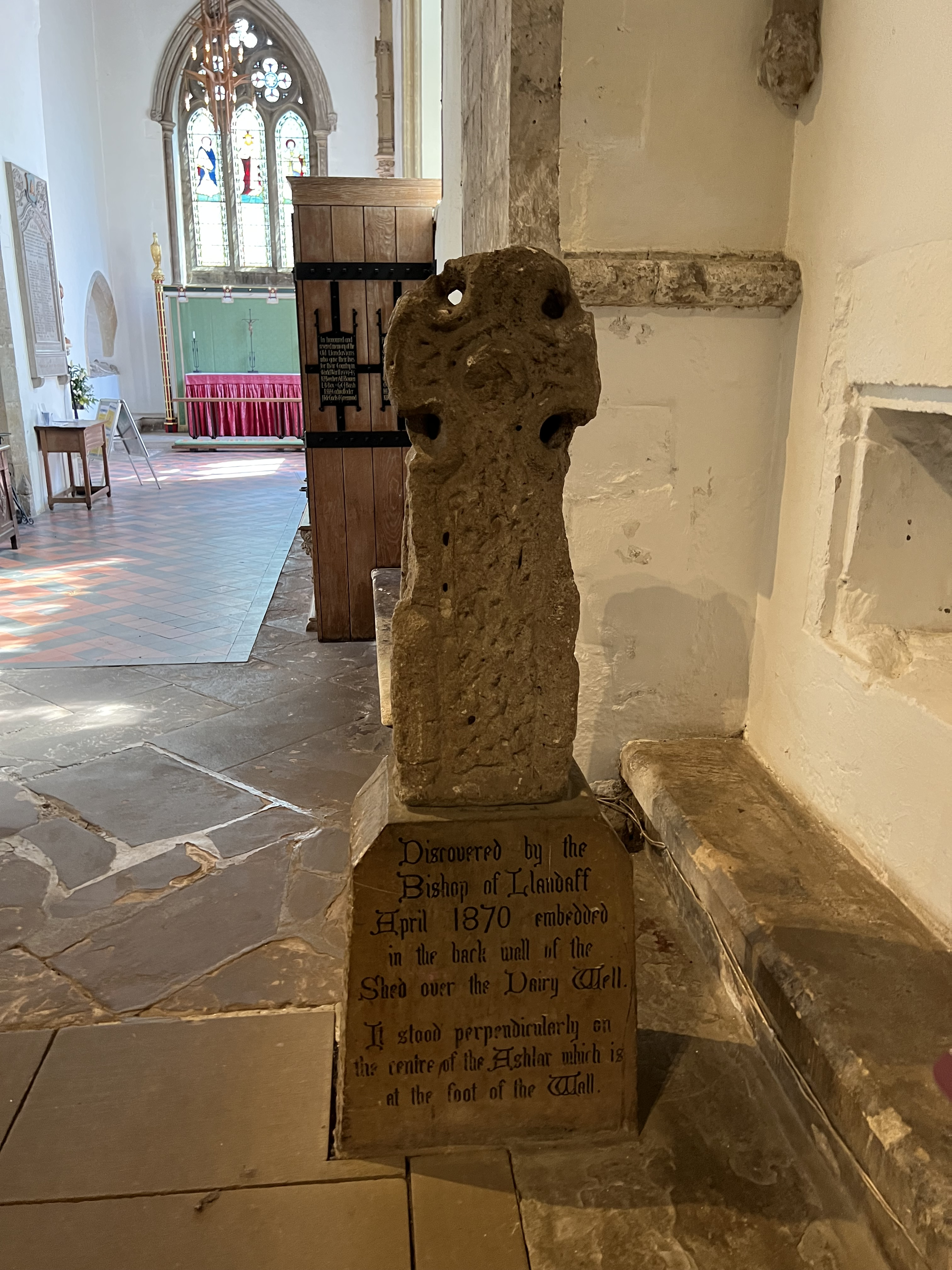
The Celtic Cross is one of the few surviving artifacts of the pre-Norman Cathedral

In their writings on Lucius of Britain, both Geoffrey of Monmouth and Iolo Morganwg state that the original Christian community at Llandaff was re-established by Saint Dyfrig (Dubricius) and his successor, Saint Teilo. The most notable legends surrounding these two state that Saint Dyfrig was made Archbishop by Saint Germanus of Auxerre while he travelled through Britain to oppose the Pelagian heresy, and link both saints with King Arthur.

The Normans considered Dyfrig and Teilo as the cathedral's founders and they, along with their successor Oudoceus, are the modern cathedral's patron saints. The continuation of a Post-Roman church is supported by the high number of ancient remains at the site (most notably an ancient Celtic cross at the Bishop's Court's well) and both secular and ecclesiastical writings.

=== Norman cathedral ===
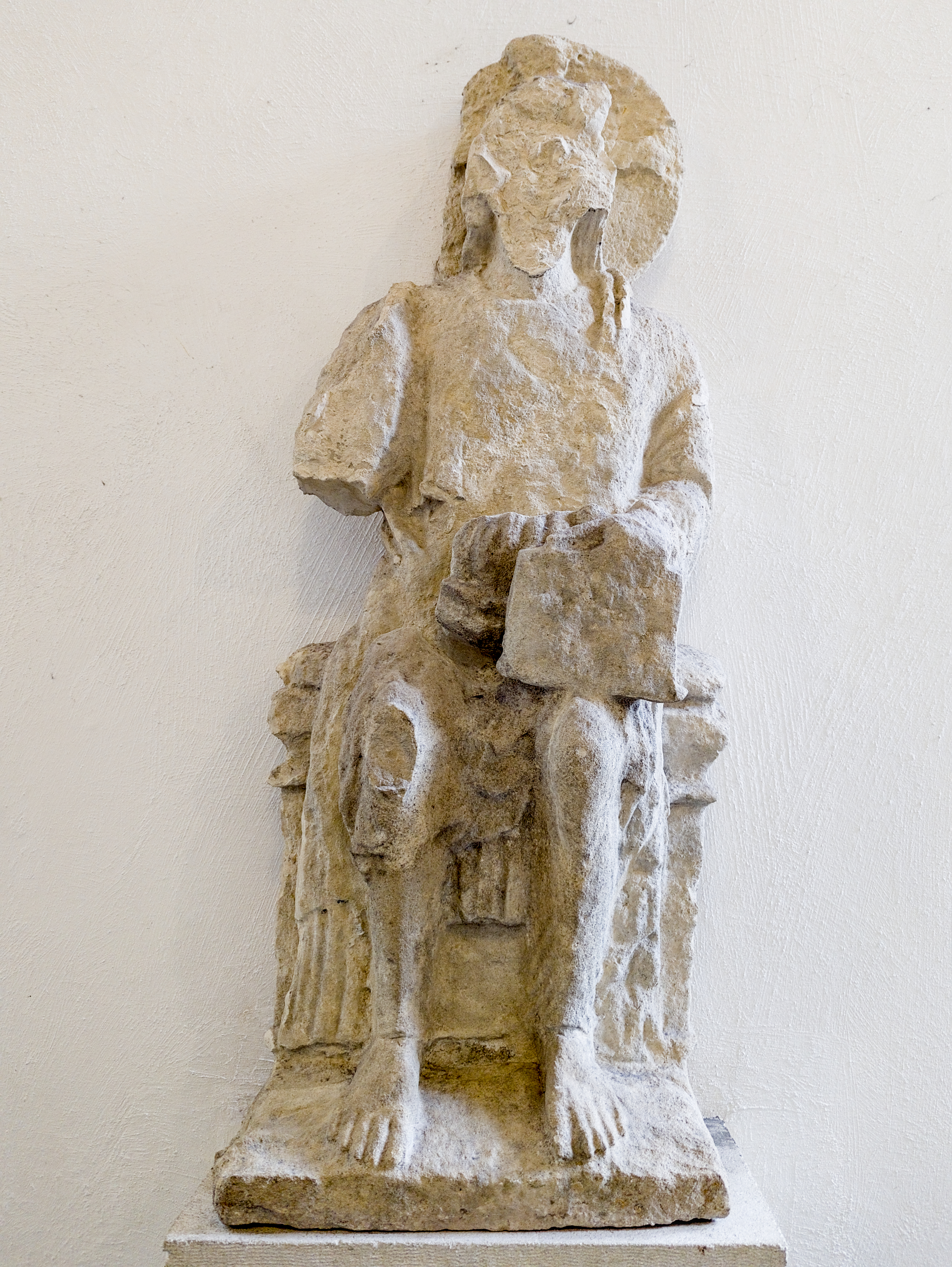
The heavily eroded medieval statue of Christ in majesty, relocated to St David's Chapel in 1984

The Normans occupied Glamorgan early in the Norman conquest, appointing Urban their first bishop in 1107. (Note: When Urban became bishop, he found the present cathedral in a half ruined state. He also felt that the size of the existing cathedral was not large enough to house the remains of Saint Dubricius. Urban described a structure which was about the size of a chapel, with the total length of the building being about 40 feet. He appealed to the Holy See for funds to construct a new cathedral in 1119.) He began construction of the cathedral in 1120 and had the remains of Saint Dyfrig transferred from Bardsey. (Note: A description of the church built by Urban is recorded in the Archaeologica Cambrensis. It was a small church consisting of a nave and chancel with possibly one polygonal tower. The nave of Urban's church eventually became the presbytery and his chancel the Lady Chapel.) After the death of Urban, it is believed the work was completed some time in the last years of Bishop Nicholas ap Gwrgant, who died in 1183. The cathedral was dedicated to Saints Peter and Paul, Dubricius, Teilo and Oudoceus.

Bishop Henry de Abergavenny organised the Llandaff Cathedral chapter circa 1214. He appointed fourteen prebends, eight priests, four deacons and two sub-deacons. De Abergavenny also made changes to Llandaff's episcopal seal, giving more detail to the figure of the bishop depicted on it and adding the phrase "by the grace of God" to its inscription. The west front dates from 1220 and contains a statue of St Teilo. By 1266, the structure that Urban began had been altered; the cathedral was dedicated again in 1266.

The Lady Chapel was built by William de Braose, bishop from 1266 to 1287. (Note: De Braose is buried in the chapel he built.) It was built at the rear of the church constructed by Urban and the old choir area was removed in order to build the chapel. From this time on, it seemed as if the cathedral was in a constant state of repair or alterations at a slow pace. After the Lady Chapel had been completed, the two bays of the north choir aisle were rebuilt.

Severe damage was done to the church in 1400 during the rebellion of Owain Glyndŵr; his forces also destroyed the Bishop's Palace at Llandaff. (Note: The 1719 Browne Willis account described the Bishop's Palace as being southeast of the cathedral and as a very stately building, judged from the gate house, which was still standing in its entirety in 1719. The site of the Bishop's Palace itself was a garden in 1719. There was also an Archdeaconal Castle for the Archdeacon of Llandaff on the cathedral property; it was destroyed at the same time as the Bishop's Palace. Another account says the Bishop's Palace and the Archdeacon's Castle were both burned to the ground.) The damage was extensive enough to cause Bishop Blethyn to notify his fellow clergymen in 1575 that he believed the cathedral to possibly be damaged beyond repair. (Note: Later a family named Mathews was granted the right of burial in the north aisle, provided the family would maintain the north aisle and provide any needed repairs. Sir David Mathew is part of this family group. The privilege granted in 1594, was revoked in 1686, when the family failed to maintain the cathedral's north aisle.) Most of the other damage was repaired, most notably by Bishop Marshall, whose reredos partly survives. The northwest tower, the one without a spire, was added by Jasper Tudor and is now named after him. (Note: There is an account of this tower as unsafe at the end of the 15th century and being re-built, not built, by Jasper Tudor.) He assumed the lordship of Cardiff after the accession to the throne of his nephew, King Henry VII of England.

Late medieval tombs include that of Sir David Mathew of Llandaff (1400–1484). Sir David ap Mathew was appointed "Grand Standard Bearer of England", by King Edward IV, for saving his life at the Battle of Towton 1461 during the Wars of the Roses.

=== Post-medieval to Victorian period ===
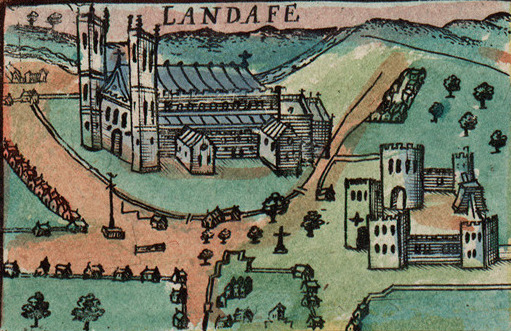
A depiction of the cathedral from John Speed's 1610 map of Wales

During the English Civil War, the cathedral was overrun by Parliamentarian troops. Along with other destruction, the troops seized the books of the cathedral library, taking them to Cardiff Castle, where they were burned along with many copies of the Book of Common Prayer. Among those invited to the castle to warm themselves by the fire on that cold winter day, were the wives of some sequestered clergymen. (Note: The library was later reestablished by Bishop Francis Davies.) Also during this time of unrest, a man named Milles, who claimed to be a practising Puritan, appropriated portions of the cathedral for his own gain. Milles set up a tavern in the cathedral, used part of it as a stable, turned the choir area into a pen for his calves and used the font as a trough for his pigs. (Note: Diagram shows the choir area was on the ground floor.)

The southwest tower suffered major damage in the Great Storm of 1703 and by 1720, was in a state of collapse. (Note: An account of the cathedral by Browne Willis in 1719 describes this tower as looking ruinous. Willis went on to say that the tower once had coarse battlements at the top and four small pinacles at the corners; most of the battlements had fallen down. Willis described the Jasper tower as being in good repair in 1719, but said that the Great Storm of 1703 removed many of this tower's battlements at its top and also two of its corner pinacles. The strong south wind blew these stones into the church yard.) The damage to the cathedral was so extensive that the church seriously considered removal of the see to Cardiff in 1717. (Note: Llandaff was not part of Cardiff until 1922.) Thomas Hancorne, a jacobite prominent in High Church circles, was prebendary of Llandaff from 1718 to 1731. Between 1720 and 1723 a series of storms damaged the cathedral further, bringing down sections of the roof. The collapse of 1723 forced worship services to be confined to the Lady Chapel and closed the western entrance of the cathedral entirely. (Note: The see began seeking funds to repair the cathedral in 1721, requesting them from William Wake, the Archbishop of Canterbury. The Archbishop was able to get the promise of £1,000 from George I and hoped to be able to get a £500 donation from the Prince of Wales (later George II). He indicated this was all he was able to do for the see and that further funds would need to come from those in the diocese and their friends.)

John Wood's plan to complete his work at Llandaff Cathedral. The eastern portion of the building, seen at right, is where Wood actually did work. The western portion, at left, is the porch and tower Wood proposed but never constructed.

Thirty years after the cathedral roof collapsed, the chapter asked an architect, John Wood, the Elder, to prepare estimates and plans to restore the cathedral. In 1734 work began on a new cathedral, designed by Wood. Wood produced an Italian temple style edifice, working only on the eastern portion of the building, while leaving the remaining western half in ruins. What Wood was trying to build at Llandaff was not Italian, but a recreation of Solomon's Temple. Another sixteen years passed before the chapter solicited funds to repair the western half of the building. (Note: Bishop Ollivant wrote in 1860 that he could find no record of what monies, if any, were received by the chapter to continue Wood's work on the western portion of the cathedral.) Wood's plans were to replace the western entrance of the cathedral with a tower and rustic porch. No changes were made to the western entrance until Wyatt and Prichard began their work in 1841, when the damage to the western portion of the structure was repaired and all traces of the Italian temple work by Wood had been removed from the cathedral. (Note: The columns, pilasters and cornices of the Italian temple were removed and installed on the library at Bishop's Court. Two urns which stood on the roof were moved to the Bishop's garden. Regarding the retention of some of the Italian temple's fittings, Bishop Ollivant wrote "The columns, pilasters and cornice, which now adorn the Library at the Bishop's Court, then of a dingy brown colour, will shew those who come after me what were the fittings of the ritual choir." As to the present day, one of the urns is now at the cathedral's prebendial house)

During the 19th century the bishop began to reside in Llandaff for the first time in centuries; no bishops of the see resided in Llandaff for almost 300 years. In 1836 there was another unsuccessful attempt to transfer the see—this time to Bristol. After the attempt at transferring the see, the office of Dean was restored to Llandaff; the position had not been filled in 700 years. The office of Dean was separated from that of the Archdeacon of Llandaff in November 1843. (Note: The office of Dean had been vacant since 1120, when the Archdeacon also became known as the Vice-Dean.) The restoration of the Dean's office was the beginning of better times for the cathedral. The new Dean, William Bruce Knight, was instrumental in bringing about the much-needed restorations.

Enough restoration had been completed to allow the cathedral to be reopened for worship on 16 April 1857. The see of Gloucester lent their cathedral choir for this service, making it possible to hear choral music in Llandaff Cathedral for the first time since 1691. The restoration done up to this point was to remove all traces of the Italian temple and to repair damages caused by the attempt to transform the cathedral by Wood. Arches with beautiful moulding were hidden by walls, Sedilia were removed from their original positions and reredos had been covered with plaster or hidden with walls.

A meeting was held after the service and a detailed restoration plan was announced at the meeting along with a list for those wishing to donate to the work. The Prince of Wales (later Edward VII) and John Crichton-Stuart, 3rd Marquess of Bute were among those who pledged donations sufficient to allow the restoration work to continue immediately. (Note: A list of those who made donations or made pledges to donate.) The cathedral was extensively restored, the tower rebuilt and a spire added. Much of the restoration work was completed by local architect John Prichard between 1843 and 1869. (Note: The post-Italian temple restoration was begun in 1841 by T. H. Wyatt. Prichard redesigned the window for the Lady Chapel in 1843. By 1845, Prichard was in charge of the cathedral project; Wyatt remained as "honorary architect" until 1853, with his plans being set aside in favour of Prichard's. The Llandaff Cathedral project launched Prichard's architectural career.) A triptych by Dante Gabriel Rossetti was designed for use as a reredos, (Note: The reredos, The Seed of David, was begun in 1860 and completed at a later date. It is described as one of the finest works of Rossetti.) and a new stained glass window, Shipwreck of St Paul, was designed by Ford Madox Brown. Sir Edward Burne-Jones designed the porcelain panels Six Days of Creation in St Dyfrig's Chapel.

From 1691 until around 1860 there had been no choir at the cathedral. (Note: The choral service was initially suspended due to the death of the cathedral organist. Financial considerations likely prompted the Archdeacon and chapter to discontinue the paid choir. It was decided to pay the schoolmaster a small sum to provide music; he did so by playing his bass violin while the cathedral's school pupils sang.) There was also no organ for some time. Browne Willis' 1719 account describes the ruins of an organ given to the cathedral by Lady Kemysh of Cefn Mably found in the organ loft at that time. In 1860, Alfred Ollivant, who was then Bishop of Landaff, published a book, Some Account of the Condition of the Fabric of Llandaff Cathedral, from 1575 to the present time, intended to raise funds to restore the cathedral's choir and to purchase a new organ. (Note: Enough money was raised to install a new organ in the cathedral 18 September 1861.) A cathedral school of some type has existed since the 9th century. Dean Vaughan reorganised the school in 1888. Since 1978 the cathedral school has accepted female pupils.

=== 20th and 21st centuries ===
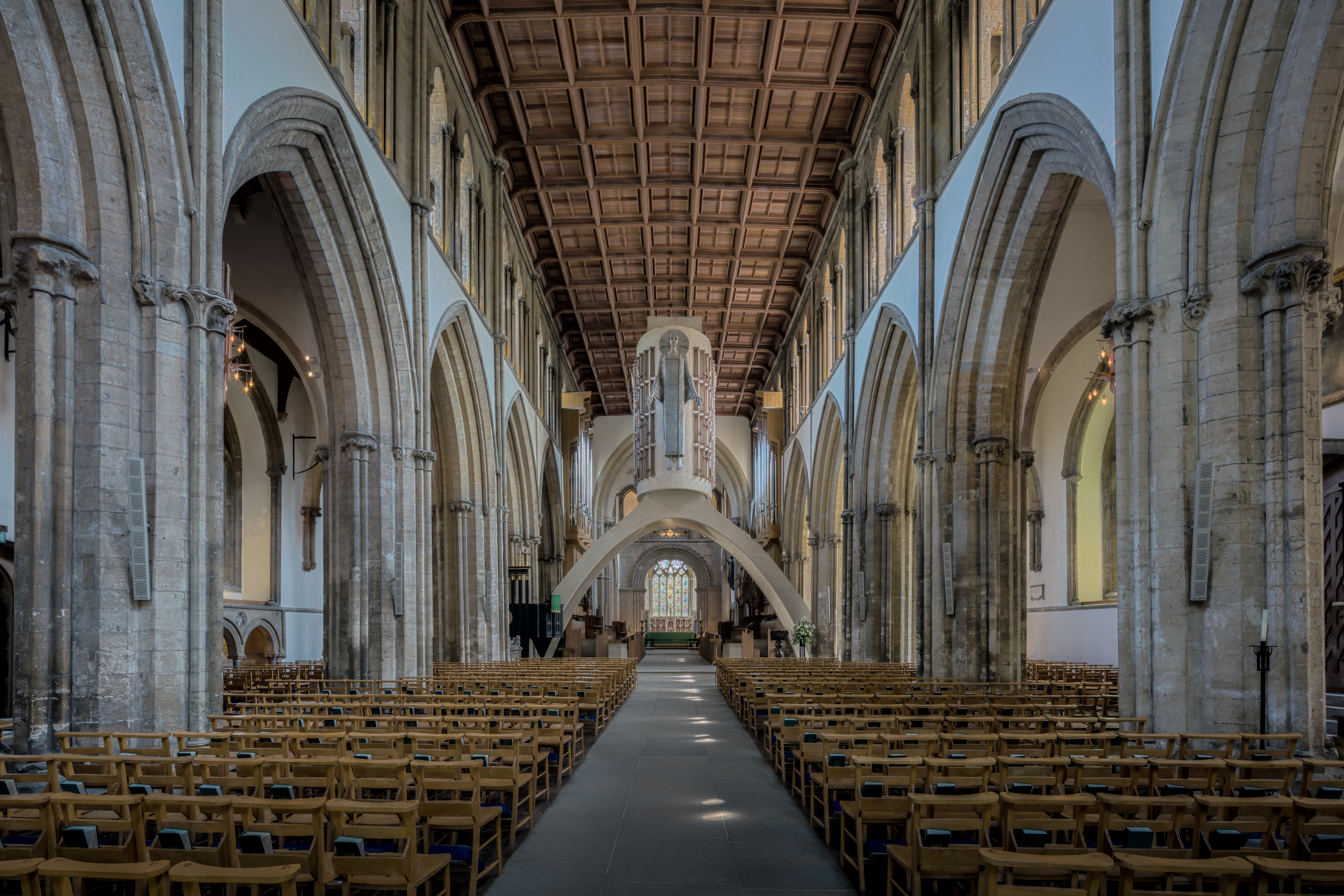
The nave of Llandaff Cathedral showing Jacob Epstein's Christ in Majesty

On the evening of 2 January 1941, during the Cardiff Blitz in the Second World War, a parachute mine was dropped nearby. When it exploded, it blew the roof off the nave, south aisle and chapter house. (Note: The mine did not explode until some days after the bombing of Cardiff.) The top of the spire also had to be reconstructed and there was also some damage to the organ. The Sunday after the bombing, worship took place in the Deanery. Work soon began to clear the Lady Chapel and the Sanctuary and to repair the roof in these areas. This was not completed until April 1942. Further work was not possible until the end of the war, and the repaired areas served as a place of worship until 1957. Of British cathedrals, only Coventry Cathedral was damaged more, during the infamous Coventry Blitz. (Note: The cathedral held a memorial service to mark the 75th anniversary of the bombing on 3 January 2016.) Due to its importance, the cathedral was given Grade I building status on 12 February 1952.

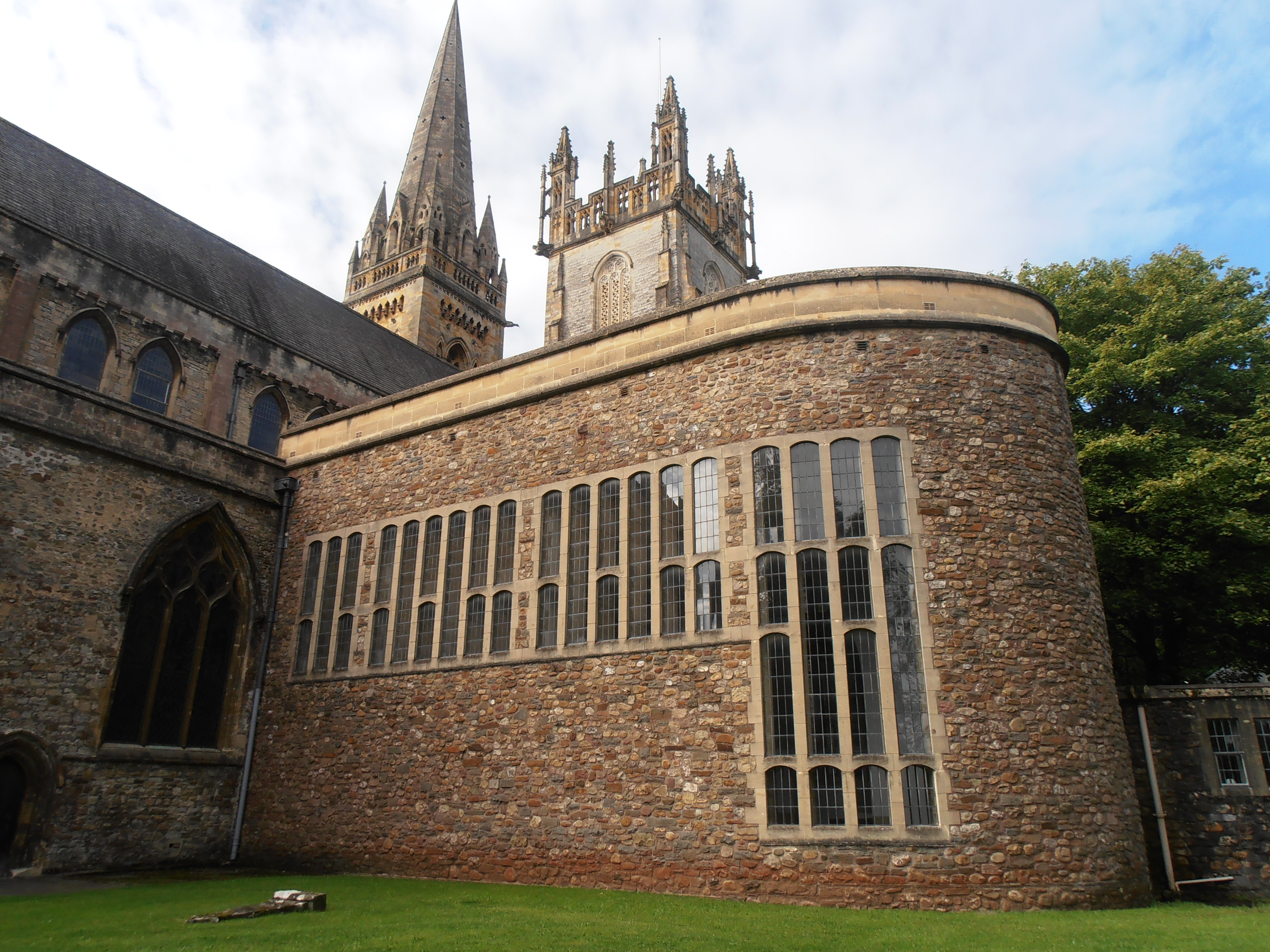
The Welch Regiment memorial chapel

Major restorations and reconfigurations were carried out under architect George Pace of York, and the building was back in use in June 1958. Elizabeth II attended a service celebrating the completion of the restoration on 6 August 1960. The Welch Regiment Memorial Chapel was constructed, and Jacob Epstein created the figure of Christ in Majesty which is raised above the nave on a concrete arch designed by George Pace. In 1959 a three-light window above the chancel arch was provided with modern stained glass depicting the Supper at Emmaus, designed by John Piper and manufactured by Patrick Reyntiens.

Pace presented two options to replace the pulpitum which was not part of the cathedral restoration done earlier by Pritchard. One was for a baldacchino having four columns with a suitable painting beneath it. The other was for a double wishbone arch topped by a hollow drum to house the division of the organ. The figure of "Christ in Glory" would be installed on the west face of the drum. This proposal was accepted by the Dean and the cathedral chapter. They approached the War Damage Commission about whether funds initially meant for replacement of stained glass damaged in the bombing could be used for art in other media. This permission helped to finance the Majestas figure.

In February 2007 the cathedral suffered a severe lightning strike. Particular damage was caused to the electrics of the organ, which was already in poor condition. The instrument was not able to be used after the lightning damage. This prompted the 2007 launch of an appeal to raise £1.5 million for the construction of an entirely new organ.

== Architecture ==
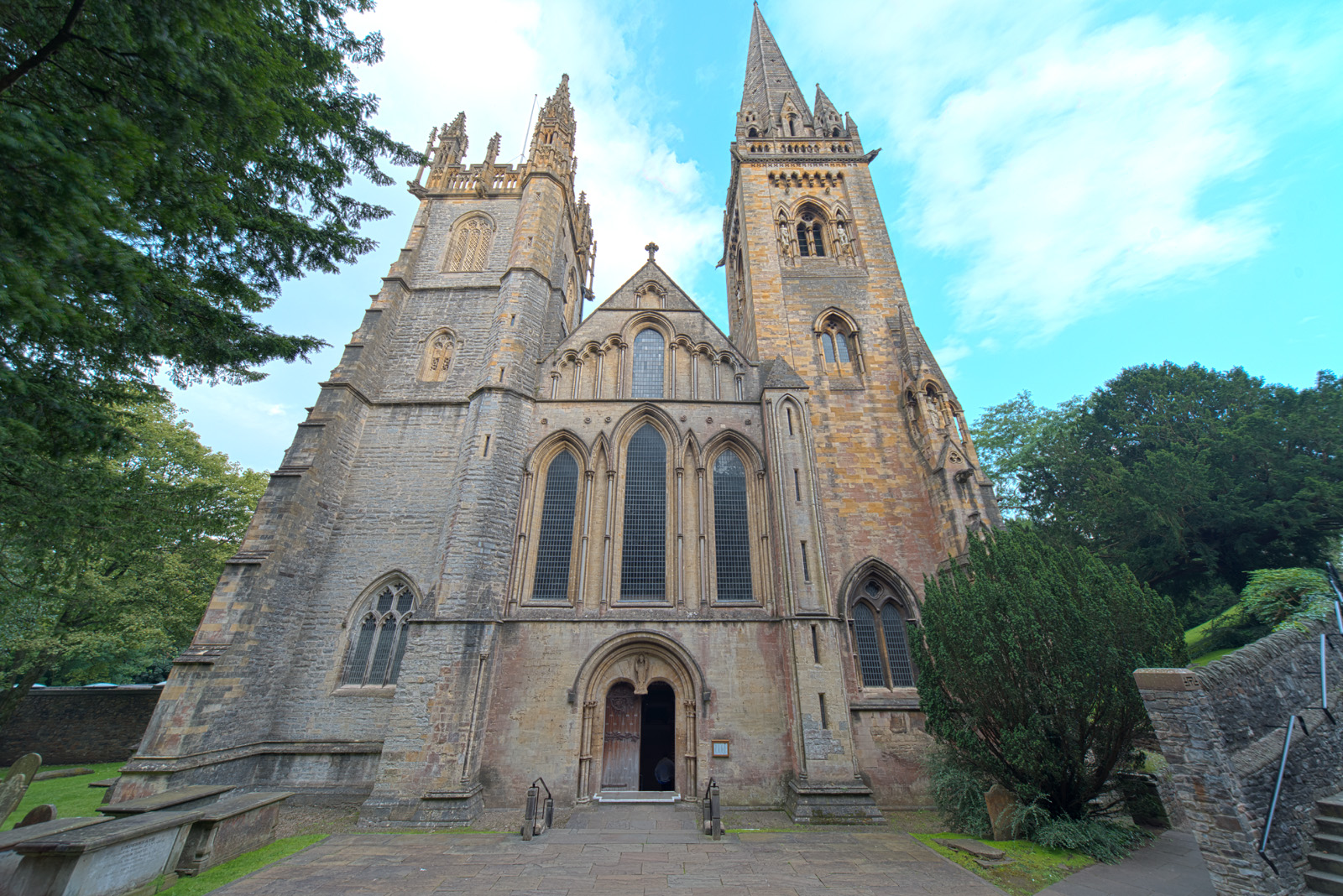
The west front of Llandaff Cathedral

The original pre-Norman church was recorded in the 12th-century Book of Llandaff to have been no more than 28 feet (8.5 m) long, 15 feet (4.6 m) wide and 20 feet (6.1 m) high. It contained low, narrow aisles with an apsidal porticus measuring 12 feet (3.7 m) long. Construction began of a grander building under the orders of the second Norman bishop of Llandaff, Urban, in the 1120s, to administer power over the newly formed diocese. It doesn't appear to have lasted long as an extensive construction was ordered between 1193 and 1218 during the episcopate of Henry of Abergavenny. The western parts replaced those that Urban had built, and the nave and front of this side remain today. The fine craftsmanship and subtlety of the architecture show a clear similarity to those of Glastonbury Abbey and Wells Cathedral, so it is probable that several of the leading craftsman of Somerset were hired for the building.

Though some remodelling work was done in the 13th and 14th centuries, with a northwest tower funded by Jasper Tudor, lord of Glamorgan from 1484 to 1495, by the late 16th century the church had fallen into a state of disrepair. In 1594 the bishop complained that the cathedral was "more like a desolate and profane place than like a house of prayer and holy exercises". The church continued to exist in a poor state, so that by 1692 choral services had to be suspended in fear that the roof would collapse. The battlements of the northwestern tower blew away during a storm in 1703, and the southwest tower fell down in 1722. In 1734, John Wood of Bath was hired to restore the cathedral, but his work on the temple was still not complete by 1752 and remained that way. It was not until 1840, in the wake of industrial development in Cardiff, that the cathedral could raise the funds to commence a full restoration.

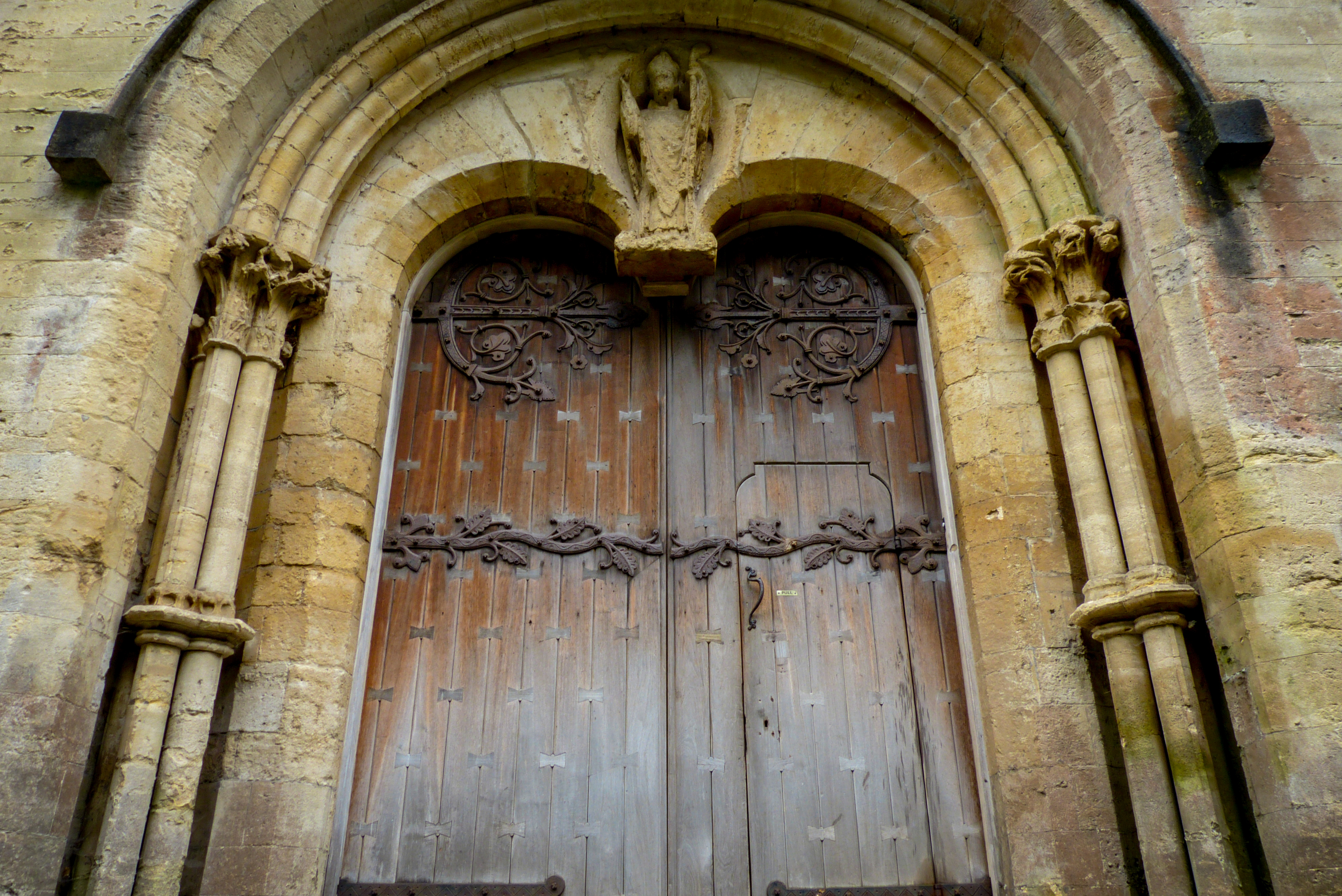
The door of the west front of Llandaff Cathedral; a statue of St Teilo is seen above the door.

T. H. Wyatt was hired to restore the Lady Chapel in 1841, but due to other commitments later left much of the work to John Prichard, who worked the most extensively on the church in the 1840s and 1850s. Prichard had restored the sanctuary by 1850, and by 1852 he had begun to work on the nave, largely demolishing the temple Wood had built. Together with London-based John Pollard Seddon, who was able to hire pre-Raphaelite artists Dante Gabriel Rossetti and Thomas Woolner, extensive developments were made. Morris & Co. provided the stained glass in the 1860s. Prichard was responsible for a dramatic redevelopment of the southwest tower in 1867–1869, aided by a number of talented artists and craftsmen.

In 1941, a parachute mine exploded near the south aisle of the cathedral, resulting in the roof of the nave collapsing and the shattering of the windows. Charles Nicholson was hired to rebuild the roof, and made the decision to remove the altarpiece that Rossetti had added to the north aisle. In 1949, Nicholson was replaced with George Pace of York, who in coordination with the dean at the time, Glyn Simon, saw a number of improvements in the modern style, though many fittings were clearly still influenced by the Gothic.

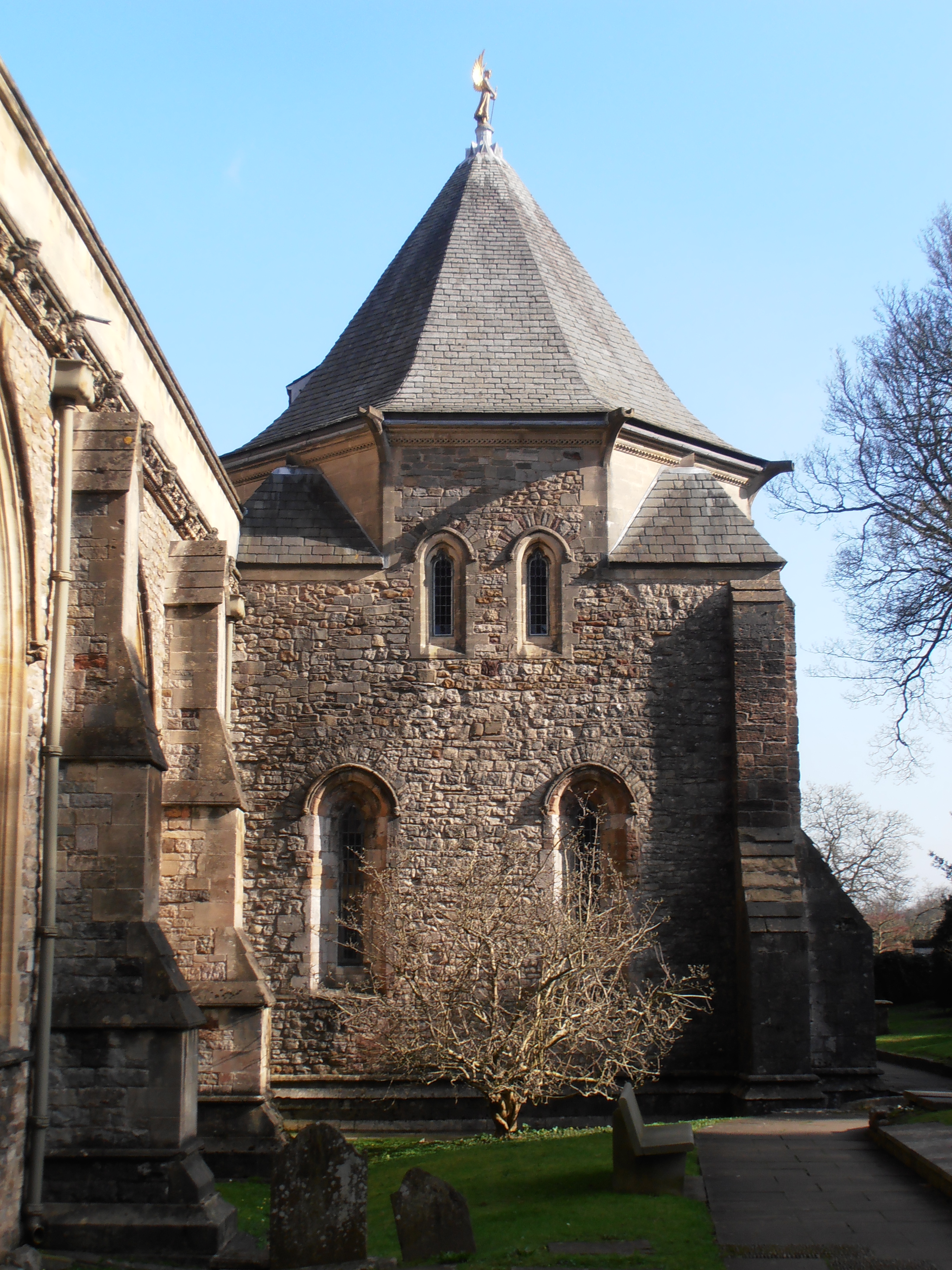
Chapter House

The material of the church which remains from the medieval period is primarily Somerset Dundry stone, though Sutton stone and local blue lias also make up the stonework, with the latter constituting most of the stonework dating from the post-Reformation period. The work done on the church since World War II is primarily of concrete and Pennant sandstone. The roofs, added in the post-war period, are made of Welsh slate and lead. The West front of the cathedral is gabled along its length and contains the grand central doorway, higher in level than the floor of the nave. It is described as being "double lobed" with an "arched head with continuous chamfer outline, colonnettes and dripmould".

The south side of the nave is characterised by eight bays with stepped buttresses between them, with aisle windows featuring reticulated heads. At the side of the south aisle of the sanctuary is the Chapter House, a small, two-storey square building. It dates to the mid 13th century and is made from Chipping Campden and Bath limestone, with some local red sandstone from Radyr. The octagonal roof was the brainchild of Prichard, though it was lowered in pitch by Pace and later worked on by Donald Buttress. The buttresses of the building are made from ashlar. The seven stained-glass roundels are of 16th-century Flemish origin. In the interior is a pulpit featuring Moses. Also of note is the St David's Chapel, added by George Pace in 1953–1956, which is accessed through the Norman north door of the cathedral.

== Chapter ==
As of 28 January 2022, the Chapter — the governing body of the cathedral — consists of:

- The Dean and Canons, the everyday clergy of the church:
  - Dean of Llandaff — Dr Jason Bray
  - Canon Precentor — Ian Yemm
  - Canon Chancellor — Kate Harrison
- Chapter Canons (clergy): Sarah Rogers; and Michael Komor, Archdeacon of Margam
- Lay Canons: Ceri Weatherall; and Paul Bennett
- Chapter Treasurer: Robert Lewis

== Music ==
=== Choirs ===
For many years, the cathedral had the traditional Anglican choir of boys and men, and more recently the Girl Choristers. The boys and girls are educated at the Cathedral School, the only dedicated choir school in the Church in Wales, .

The Cathedral Choir consists of boys and alto, tenor and bass parts, and sing on Sundays at the Choral Eucharist and at Choral Evensong. The full choir also sings on Thursdays for Evensong, with the boys singing alone on Tuesdays and the lower voices on Fridays. The Girl Choristers and Schola Cantorum keep the choral tradition going through the week, with full SATB services for Evensong on Mondays and Wednesdays, directed by the Master of Choristers of the Cathedral School. The Girl Choristers occasionally sing with the Cathedral Choir, and have sung at large services, including a National Service of Remembrance, on Remembrance Sunday in 2018.

In addition, the parish choir sings at the weekly Parish Eucharist, and is a mixed choir of boys, girls, men and women. The cathedral has a ring of twelve bells (with an additional "flat sixth", to make thirteen in total) hung for change-ringing, located in the Jasper tower. The current bells were installed in 1992, replacing a previous ring of ten. (Note: Browne Willis' 1719 account of the structure described a long-ruined tower situated southwest of the cathedral, which held a large bell known as St Peter's bell. It was removed by Jasper and taken to Exeter, where it was exchanged for five smaller bells which were then hung in the Jasper tower. The bell was taken to Exeter Cathedral circa 1484.) Only one other church in Wales has a ring of twelve bells; the cathedral is the only church in Cardiff with a set of twelve bells.

In December 2013, five days before Christmas, the cathedral chapter announced that all salaried adult members of the choir (altos, tenors and basses) were being made redundant, along with the assistant organist. The cathedral was in the midst of a financial crisis, and the chapter intended to save £45,000 a year by taking these measures.

=== Recordings ===
In 2012 the cathedral premiered its own record label, with a recording called Majestas. The music focuses on the new cathedral organ and the Llandaff Cathedral choir. The recording's title was taken from the Jacob Epstein sculpture in the cathedral's nave that was part of the post-war renewal of the structure. Proceeds from sales of the record were donated to African charities.

In August 2018, a recording of the 2010–13 Nicholson Organ was released. The organ is played by the Director of Music, Stephen Moore, and is called Deo Gracias.

In December 2018, the cathedral launched a recording of its Cathedral Choir called Nadolig yn Llandaf, showcasing seasonal music for Advent to Christmas. This was the first CD of the cathedral's choir since Majestas in 2012.

=== Organs ===
==== Main organs ====
The first organ at Llandaff was built in 1861 by Gray and Davison. In the late 1800s, this organ was antiquated, and its pipes were moved to St. Mary's Church, Usk.

The second organ was built in 1900 by Hope-Jones with Norman and Beard. This organ was rebuilt in 1937 by Hill, Norman and Beard. It received significant renovations by its builders after wartime damage to the cathedral; it was never entirely satisfactory from this point onwards, even before a 2007 lightning strike made it unusable. Originally it had been planned to install a new organ at that time, but the costs of about £1,000,000 were deemed to be too high in the austere climate of post-war Britain.

Organ manufacturer Nicholson & Co Ltd began installation of a new organ in autumn 2008 and although not fully completed, it was brought to a playable stage by Easter 2010. Its inaugural performance was the Gloria of Louis Vierne's Messe solennelle, performed at the Easter Vigil service on 3 April 2010. Proceeds from the 2011 Llandaff Festival of Music were donated to the cathedral for the completion of the new organ. The remaining stops were added in the late summer of 2013. It was the first entirely new organ for a British cathedral since the Coventry installation in the 1960s. (Note: A specification can be seen here.)

==== Lady Chapel organs ====
Two chamber organs have been used in the Lady Chapel at the east end of the cathedral. The first, built in 1946 by Hill, Norman and Beard, had two manuals and pedals. This was replaced in 1960 with a single manual chamber organ built by Henry Willis & Sons, which remains there today.

== Clock ==
A new clock and carillon was installed as a memorial to Dean Henry Lynch Blosse and set going on 25 December 1879. It was constructed by Gillett and Bland of Croydon and initially there was no external dial. It was an eight-day clock which struck the hour on the tenor bell with a hammer of 23 pounds (10 kg). The mechanism also included Cambridge Quarters. Clock weights of 15 cwt suspended from barrels by steel wire lines provided power during their descent of 72 feet (22 m). The carillon played seven tunes on eight bells: Sunday - “We love the place”, Monday - “Hanover”, Tuesday - “Vesper hymn”, Wednesday - “The Church's one Foundation”, Thursday - “Holy! Holy! Holy!”, Friday - “Conquering kings their titles take”, Saturday - “Blest are the pure in heart”. The clock came with a guarantee that it would not vary by more than five seconds per week.

== Burials ==
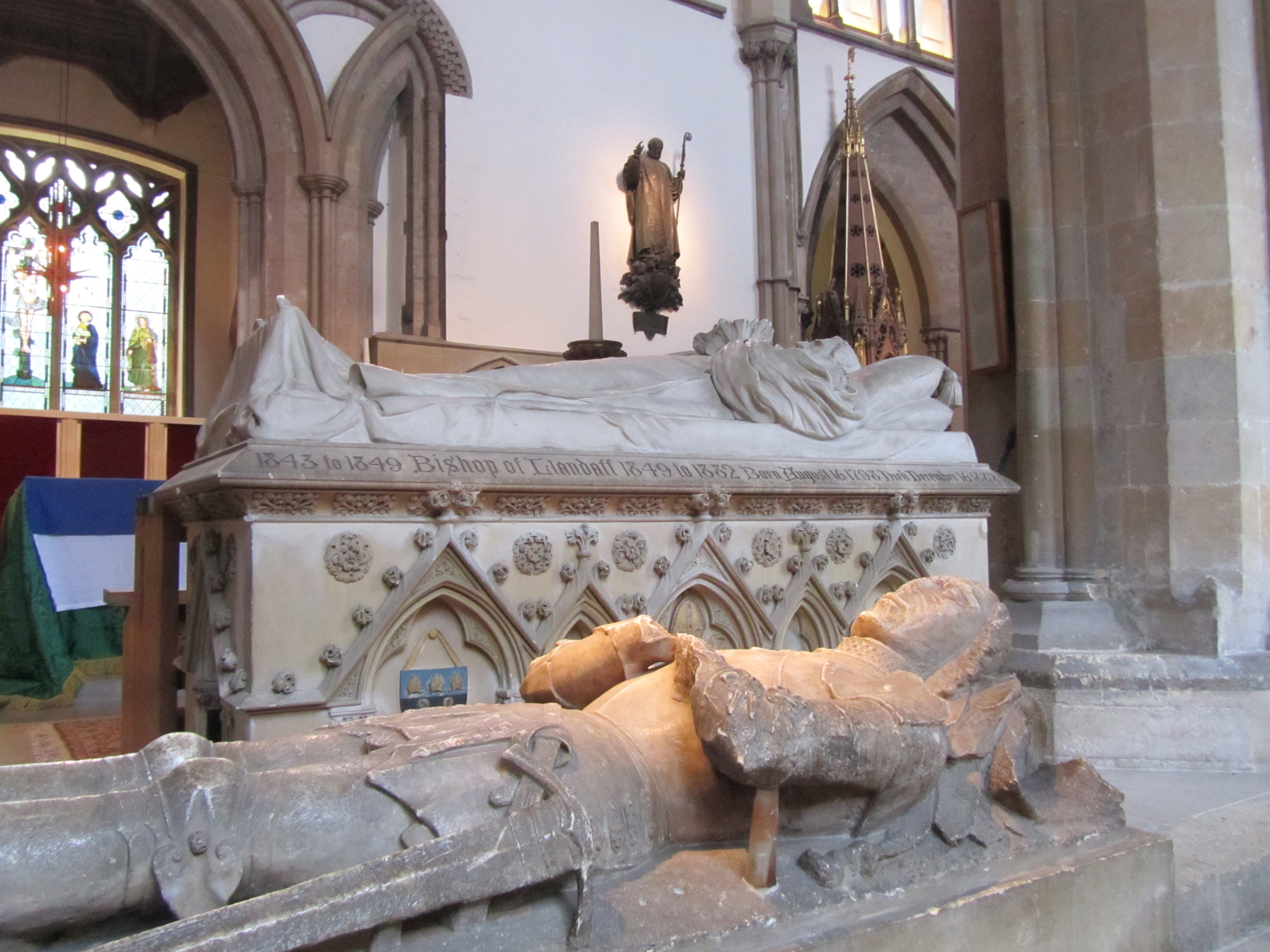
Tombs in Llandaff Cathedral

- Dubricius, 6th-century saint who evangelised Ergyng (now Archenfield) and much of South-East Wales; his body was transferred to Llandaff Cathedral in 1120
- Teilo, 6th-century clergyman, church founder and saint
- Henry de Abergavenny, Bishop of Llandaff (1193–1218)
- William de Braose, Bishop of Llandaff (1266–1287)
- John of Monmouth, Bishop of Llandaff (1297–1323)
- Edmund de Bromfield, Bishop of Llandaff (1390–1393)
- John Paschal, Bishop of Llandaff (1347–1361)
- John Smith, Bishop of Llandaff (1476–1478)
- Sir David Mathew, (1400–1484), born Dafydd ap Mathew, was Lord of Llandaff and Seneschal of Llandaff Cathedral, and one of the ten Great Barons of Glamorgan, a Marcher Lord. After saving the life of Edward IV at the Battle of Towton in 1461, he was appointed Grand Standard Bearer of England, and the King granted him the use of "Towton" on the Mathew family arms.
- John Marshall (bishop), Bishop of Llandaff (1478–1496)
- Miles Salley, Bishop of Llandaff (1500–1516 or 1517)
- Hugh Lloyd (bishop), Bishop of Llandaff (1660–1667)
- Francis Davies, Bishop of Llandaff (1667–1675)
- Edward Copleston, Bishop of Llandaff (1828–1849) (Note: Edward Copleston was the first bishop buried at Llandaff since Francis Davies.)
- Alfred Ollivant, Bishop of Llandaff (1849–1882)

== Gallery ==
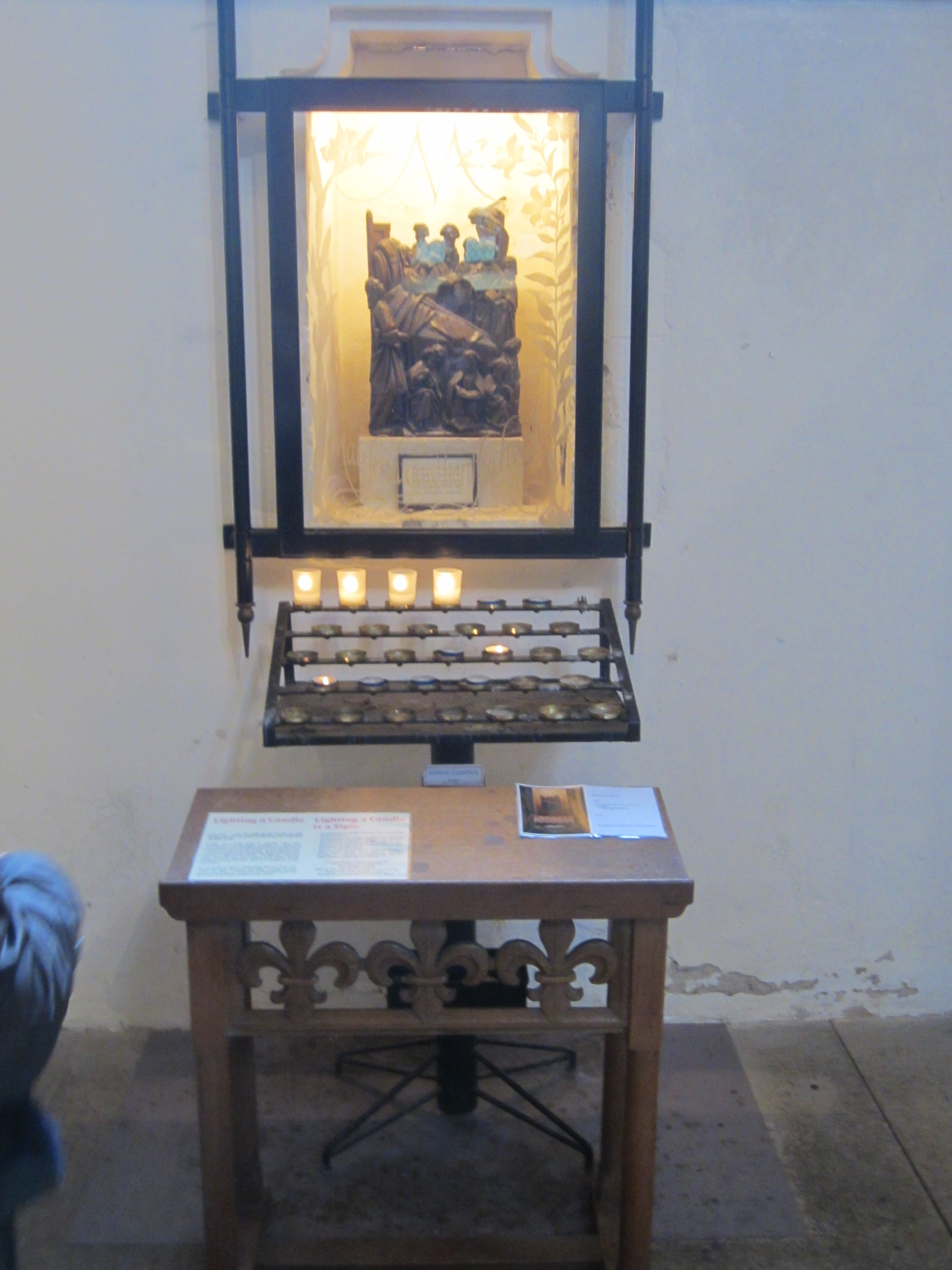
Votive Altar

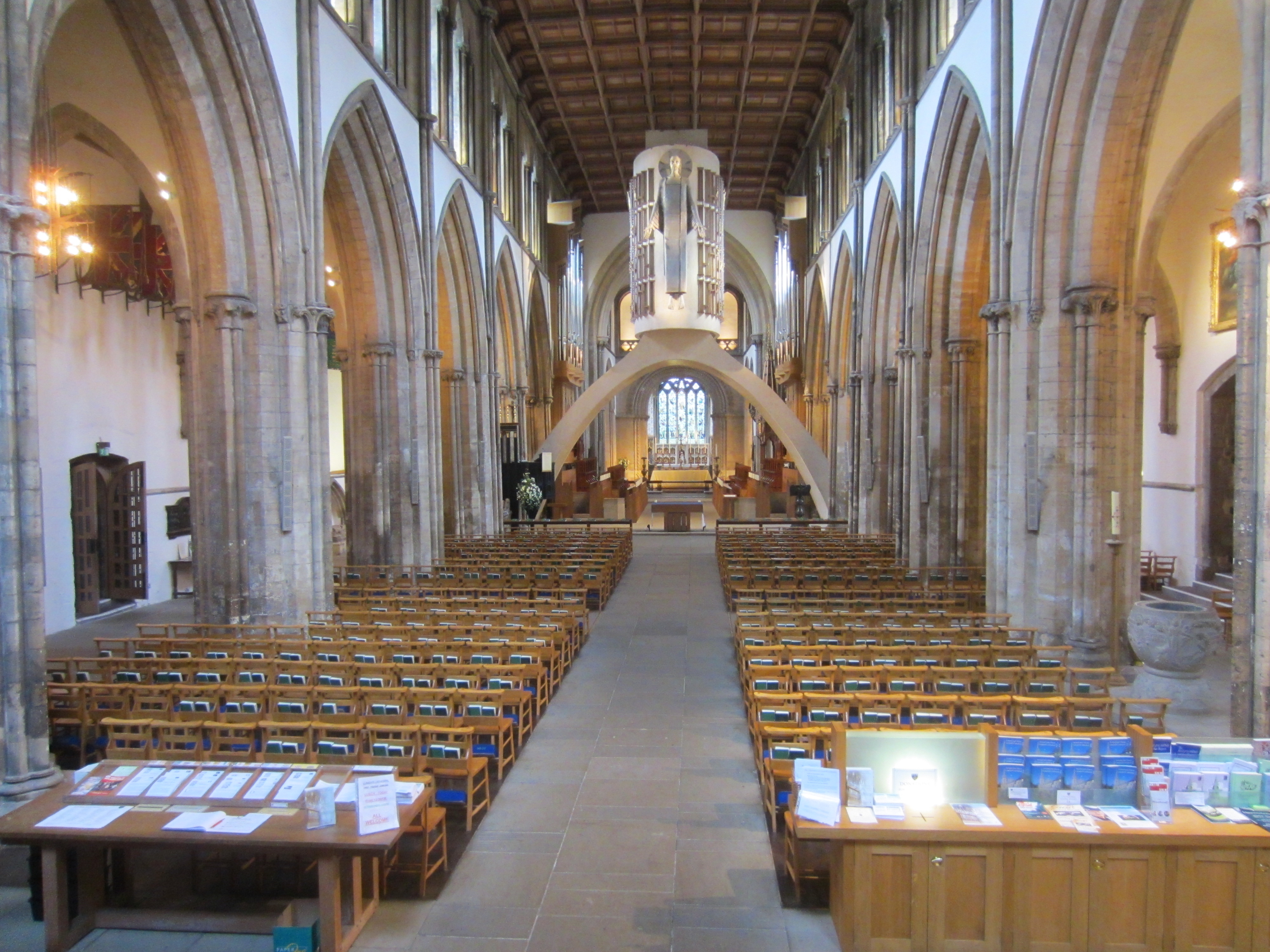
Interior Sanctuary

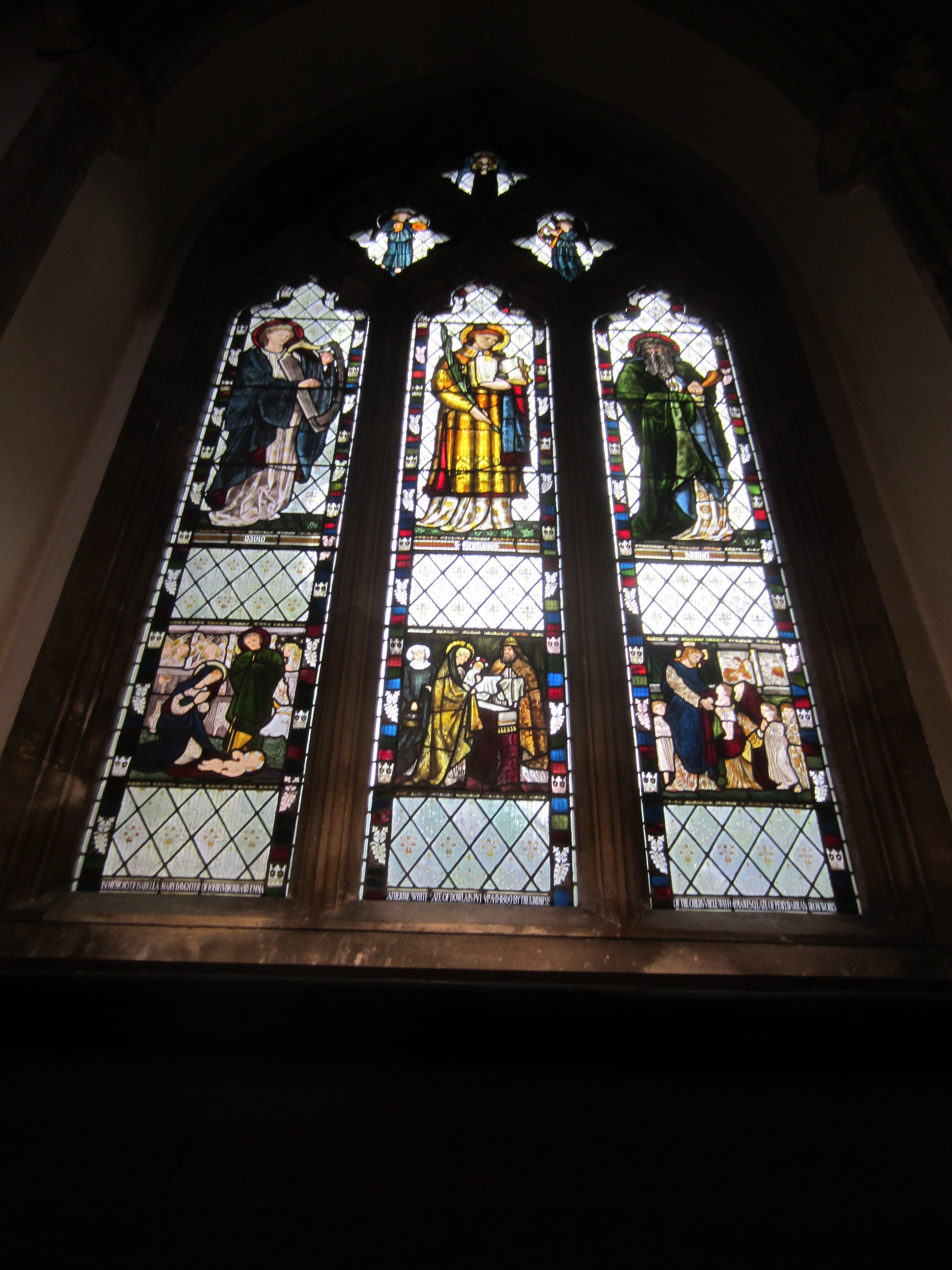
Stained Glass

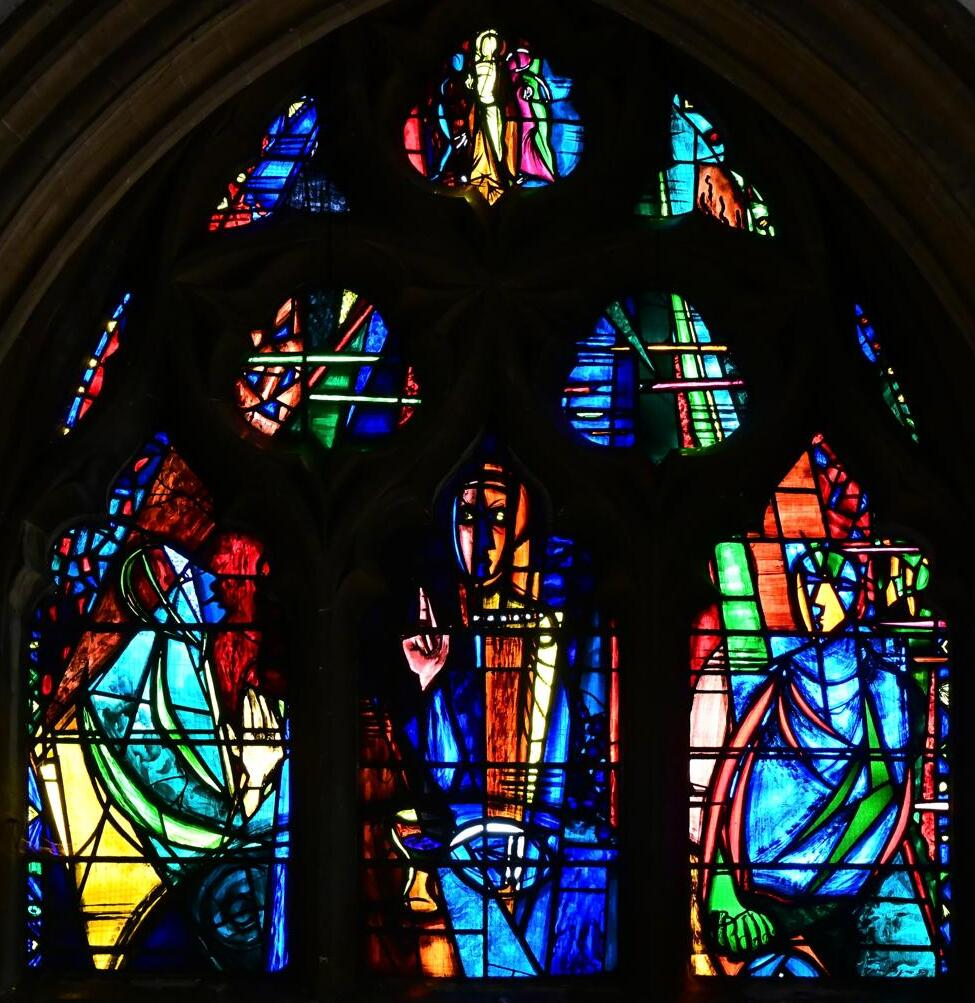
Window by John Piper

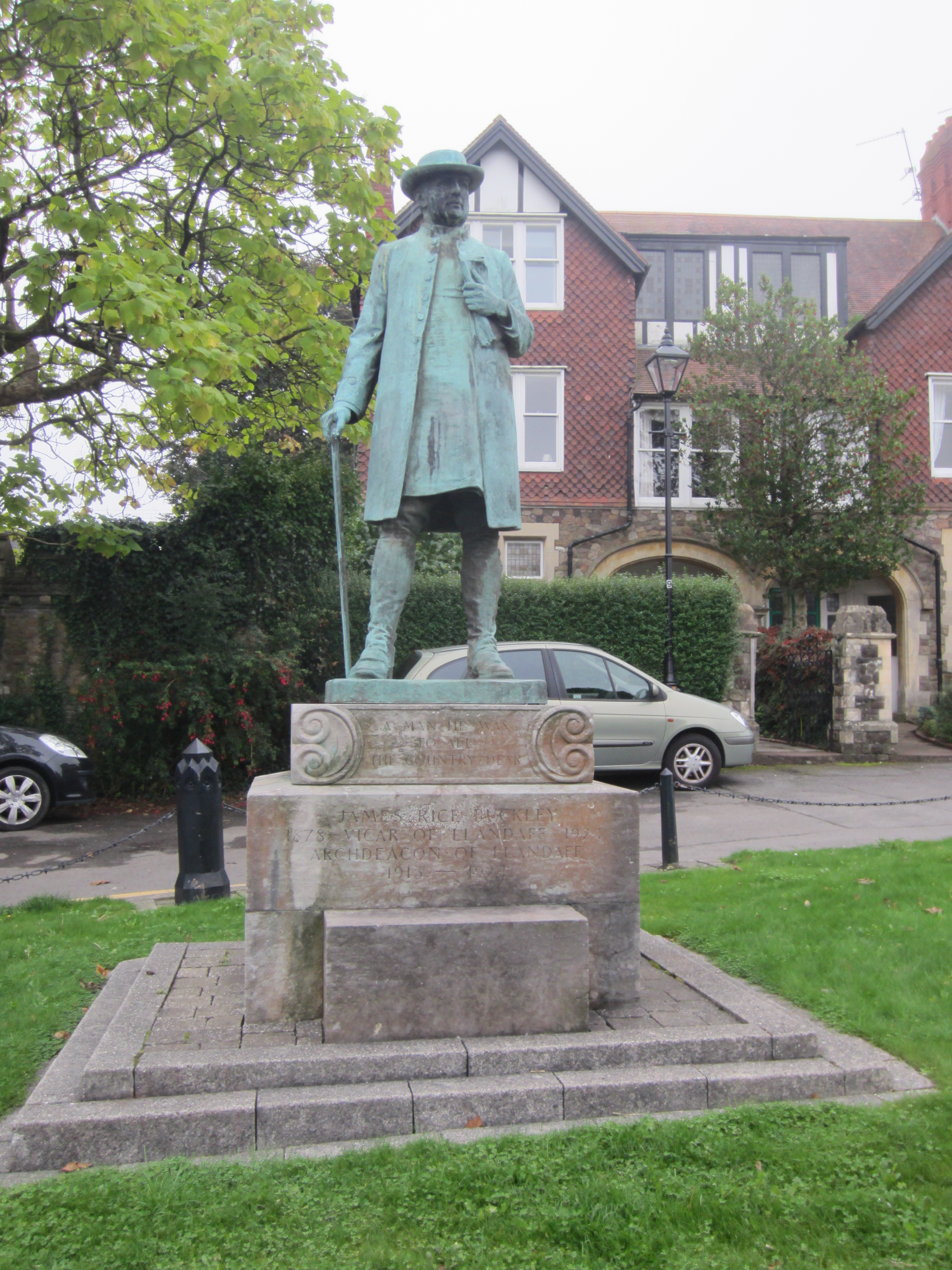
James Rice Buckley Monument

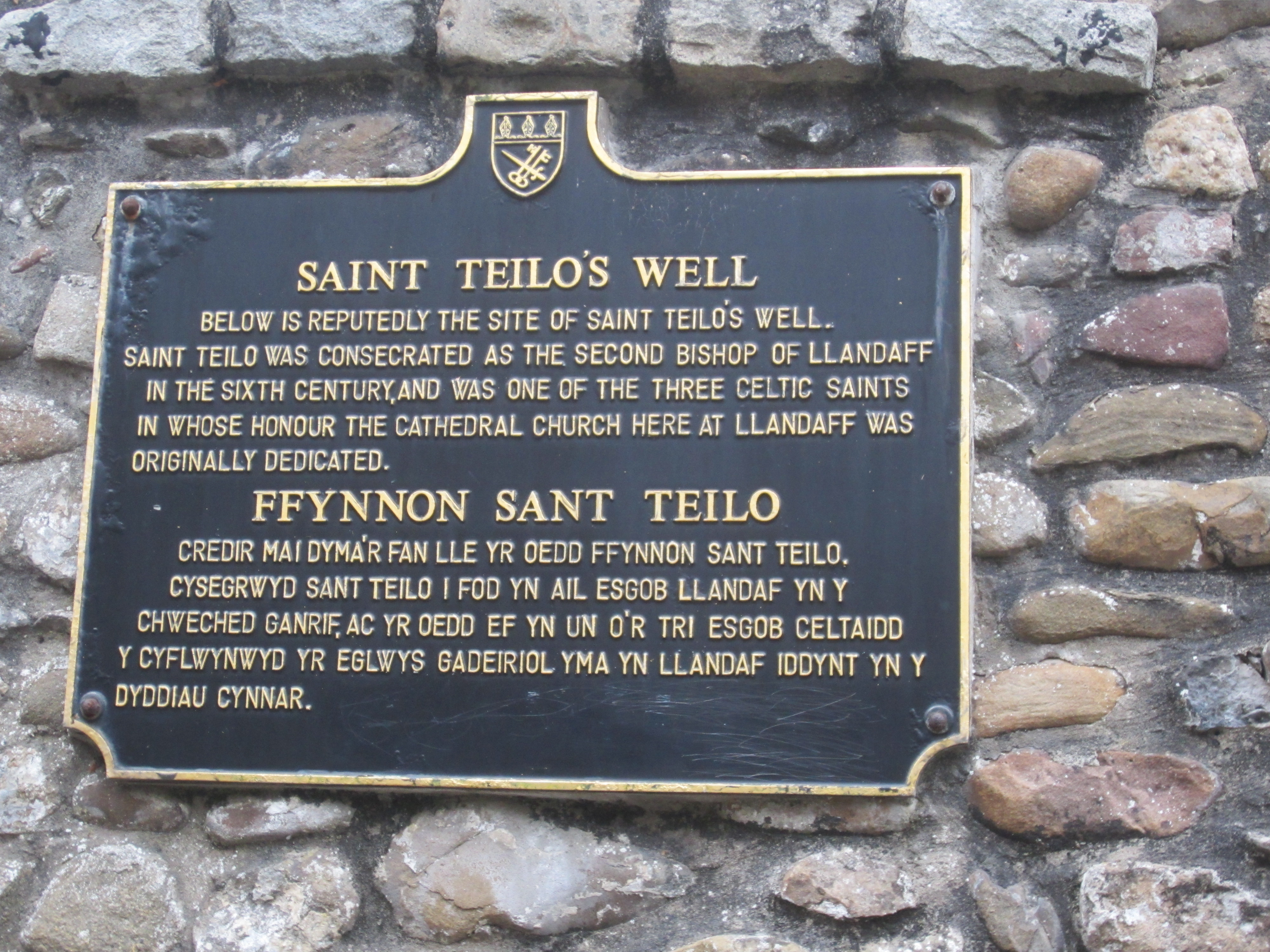
Saint Teilo's Well

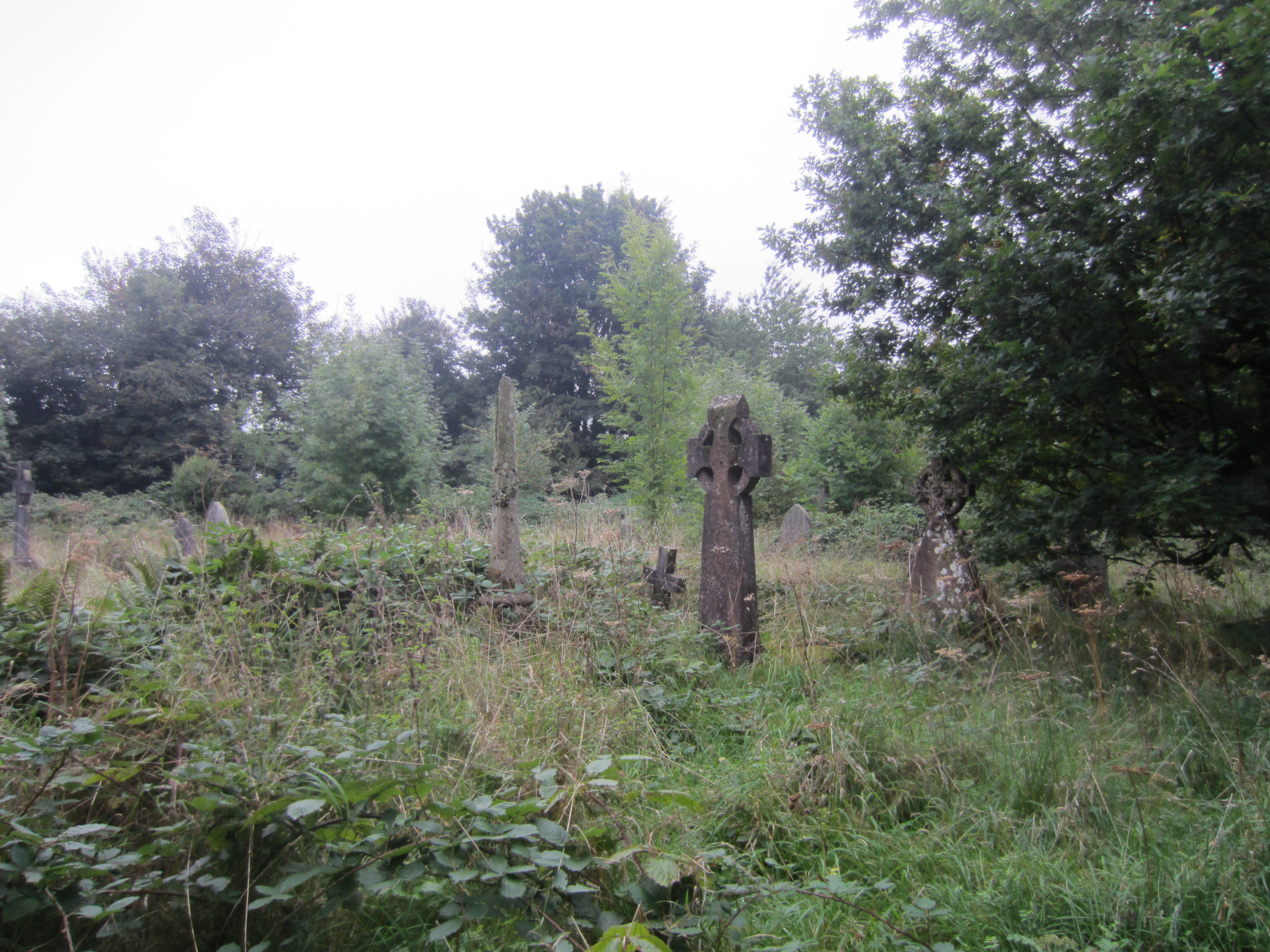
External Churchyard

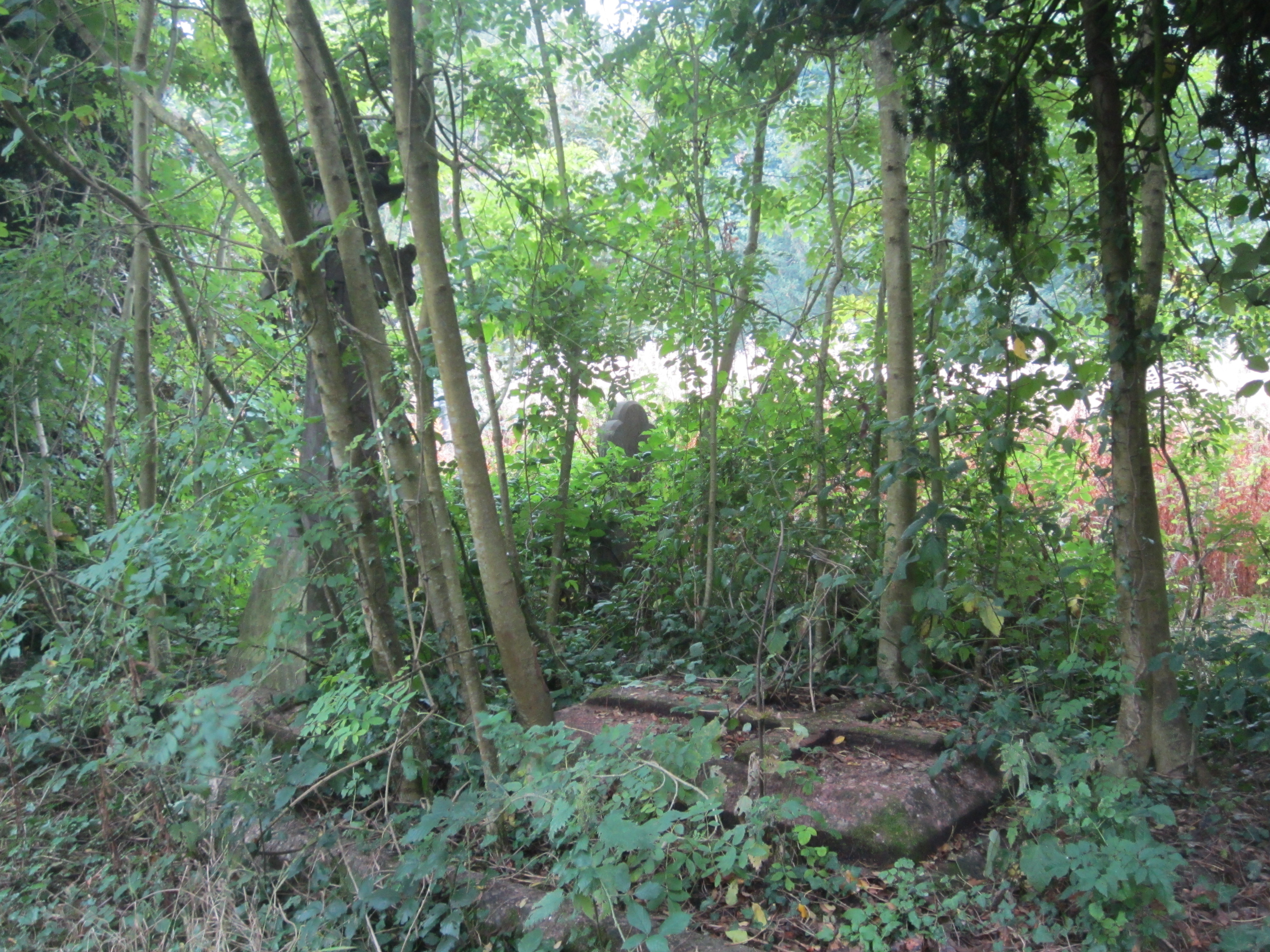

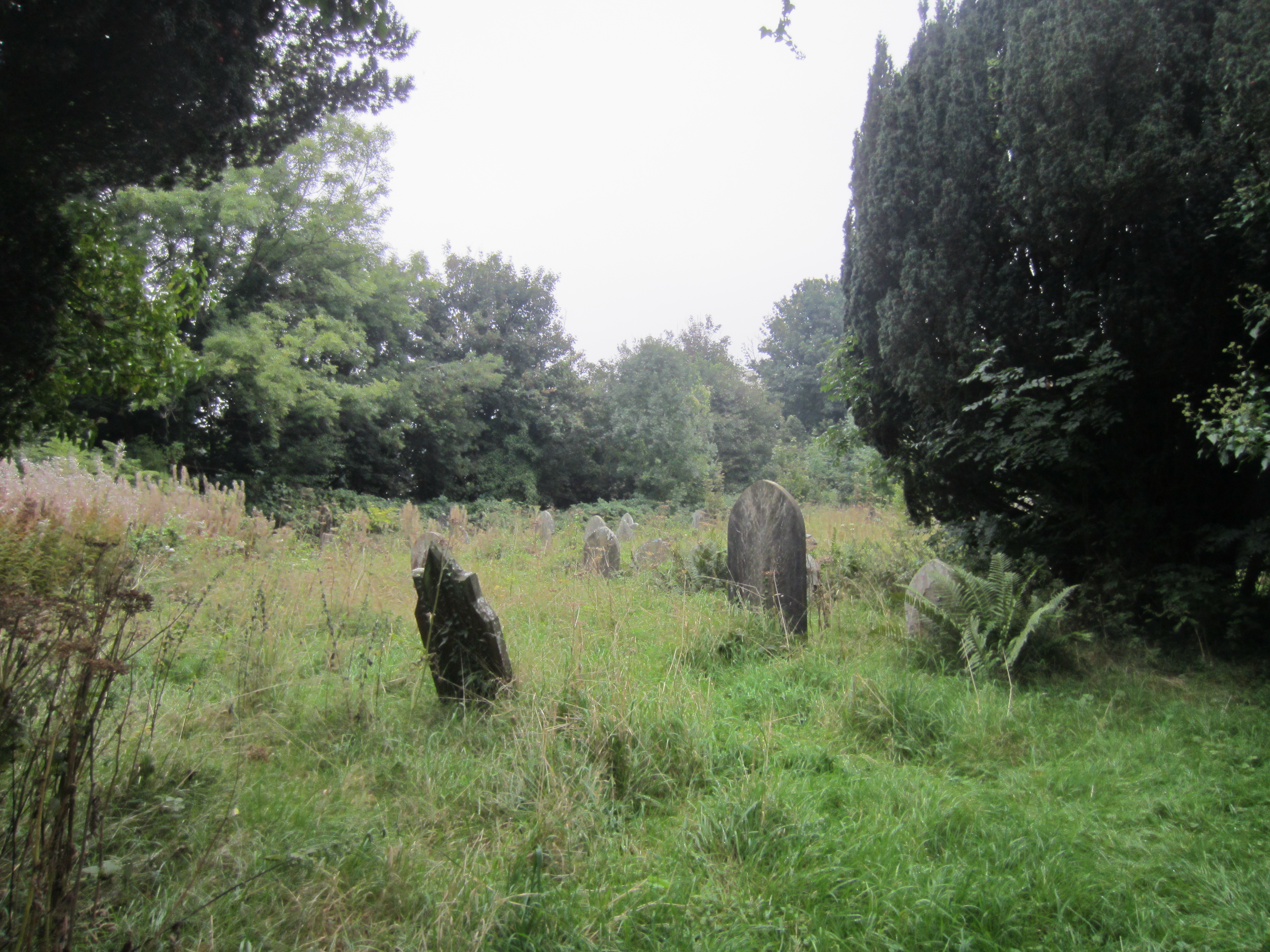

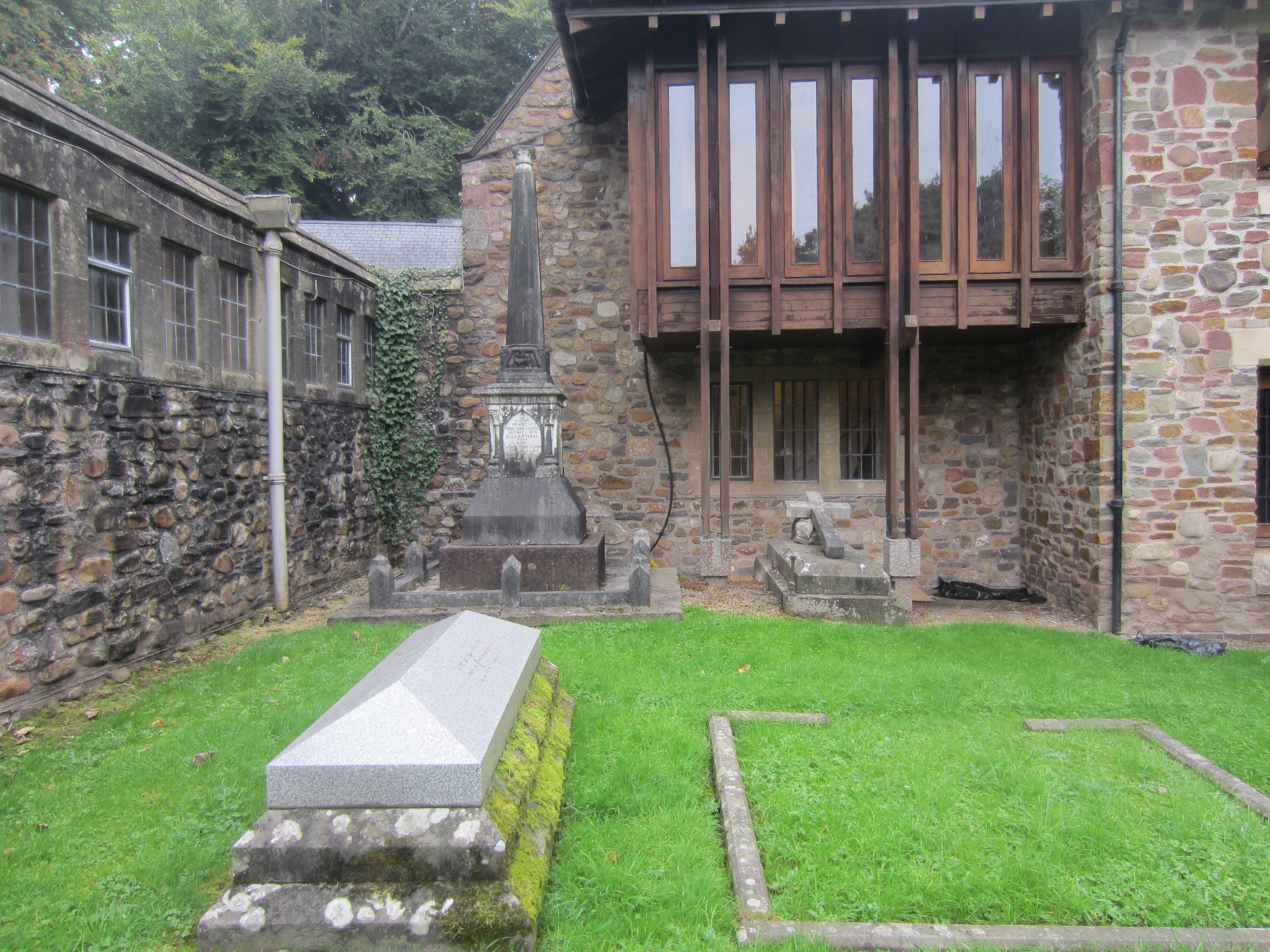

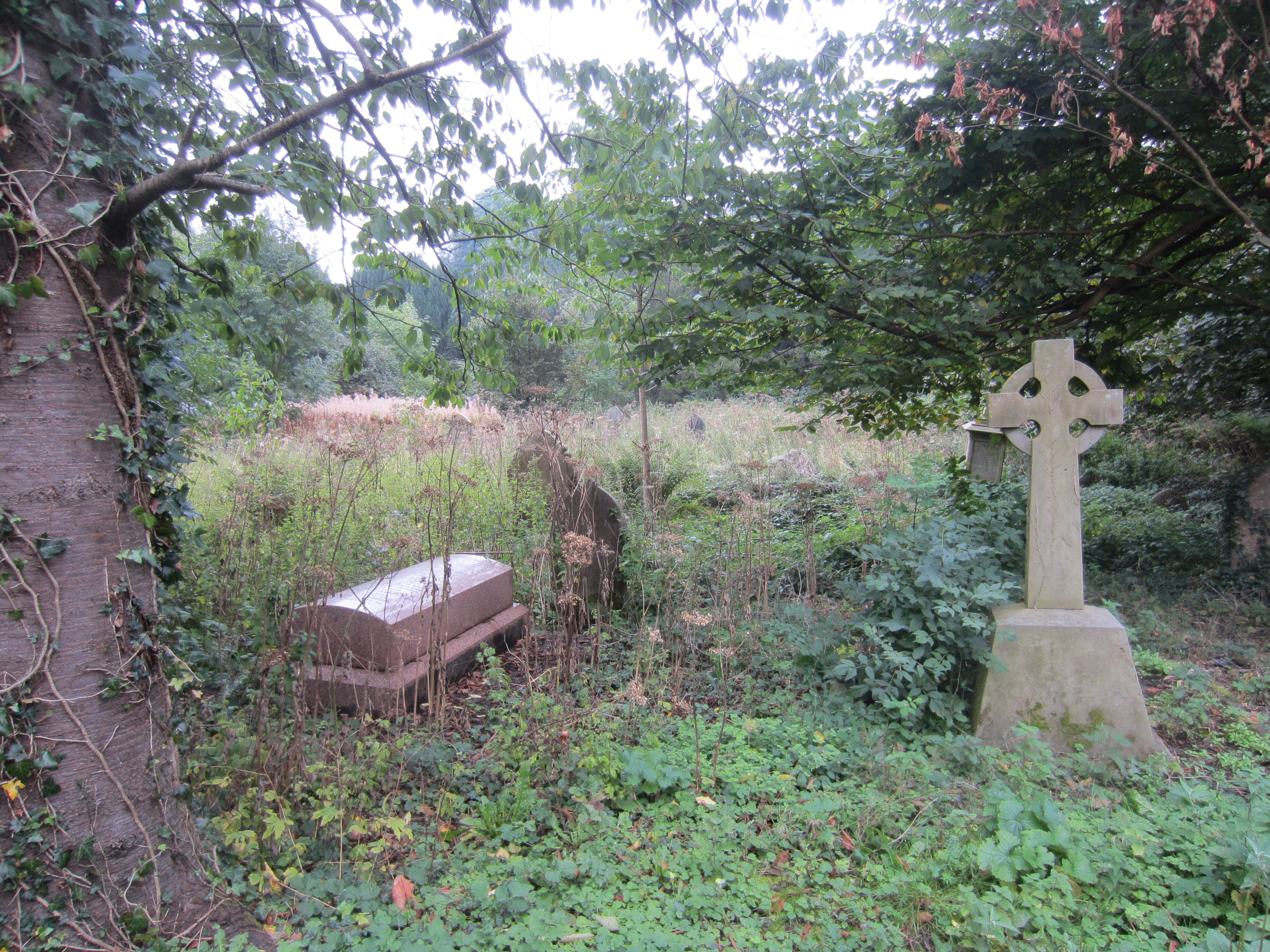

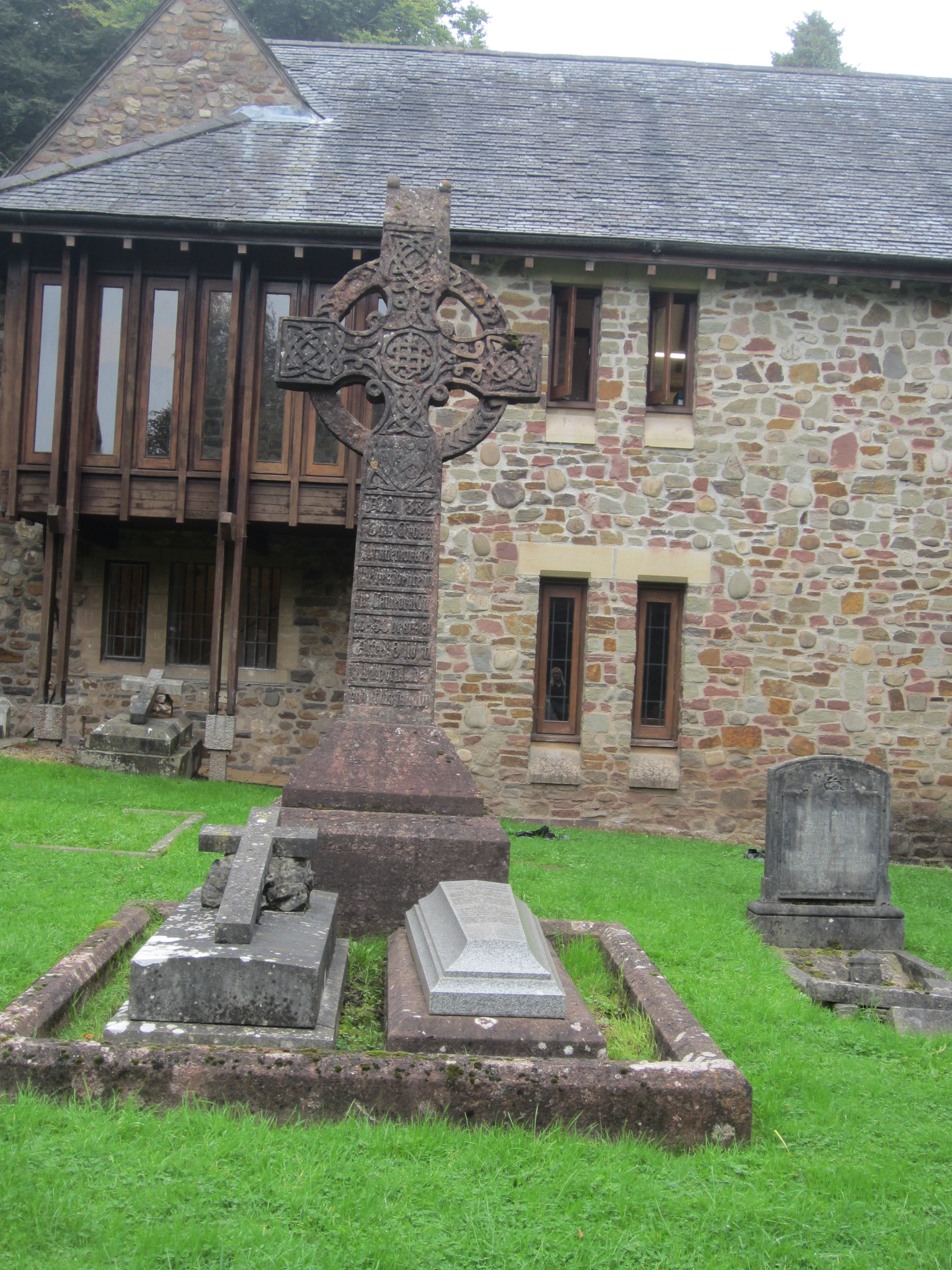

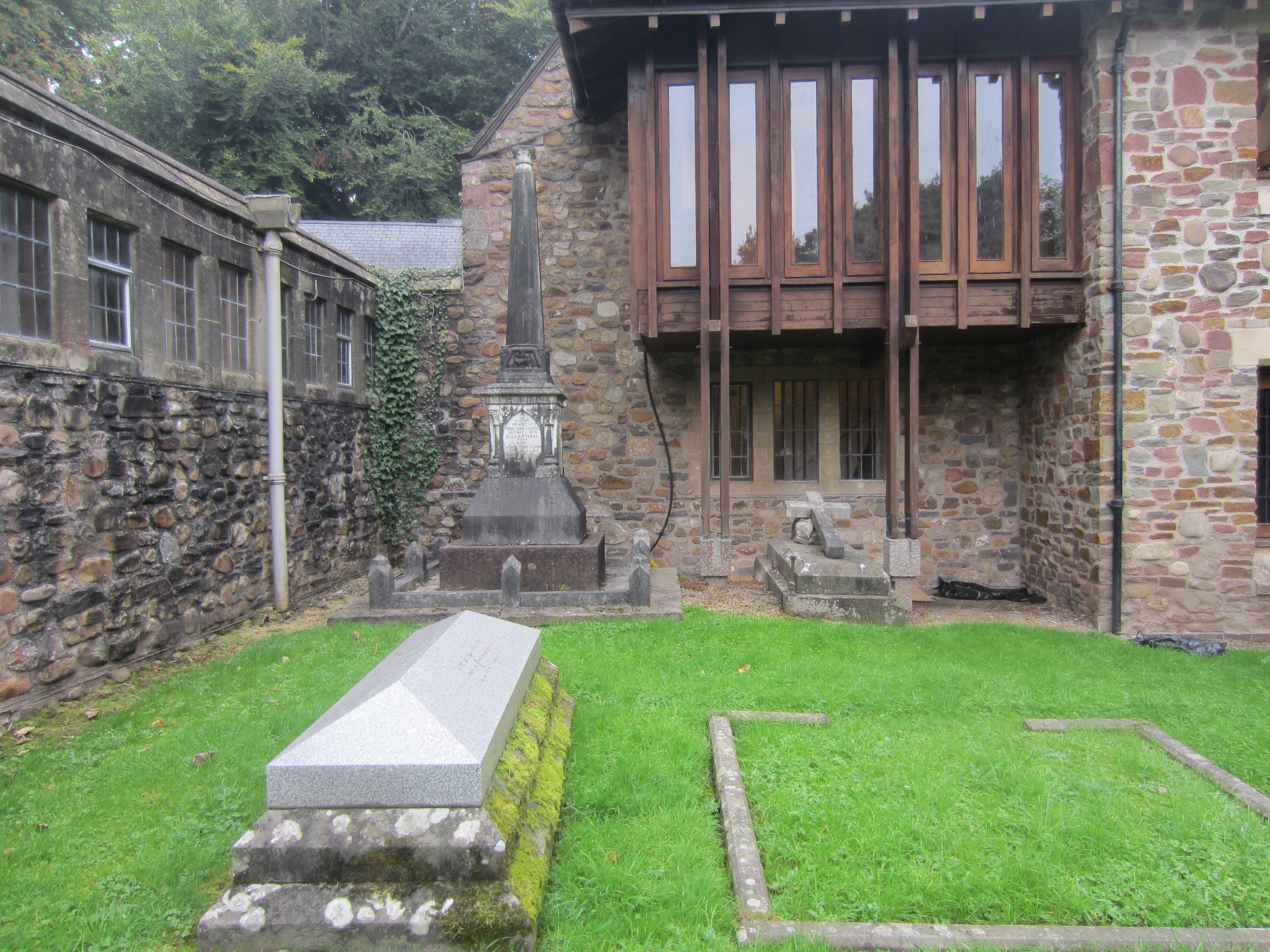

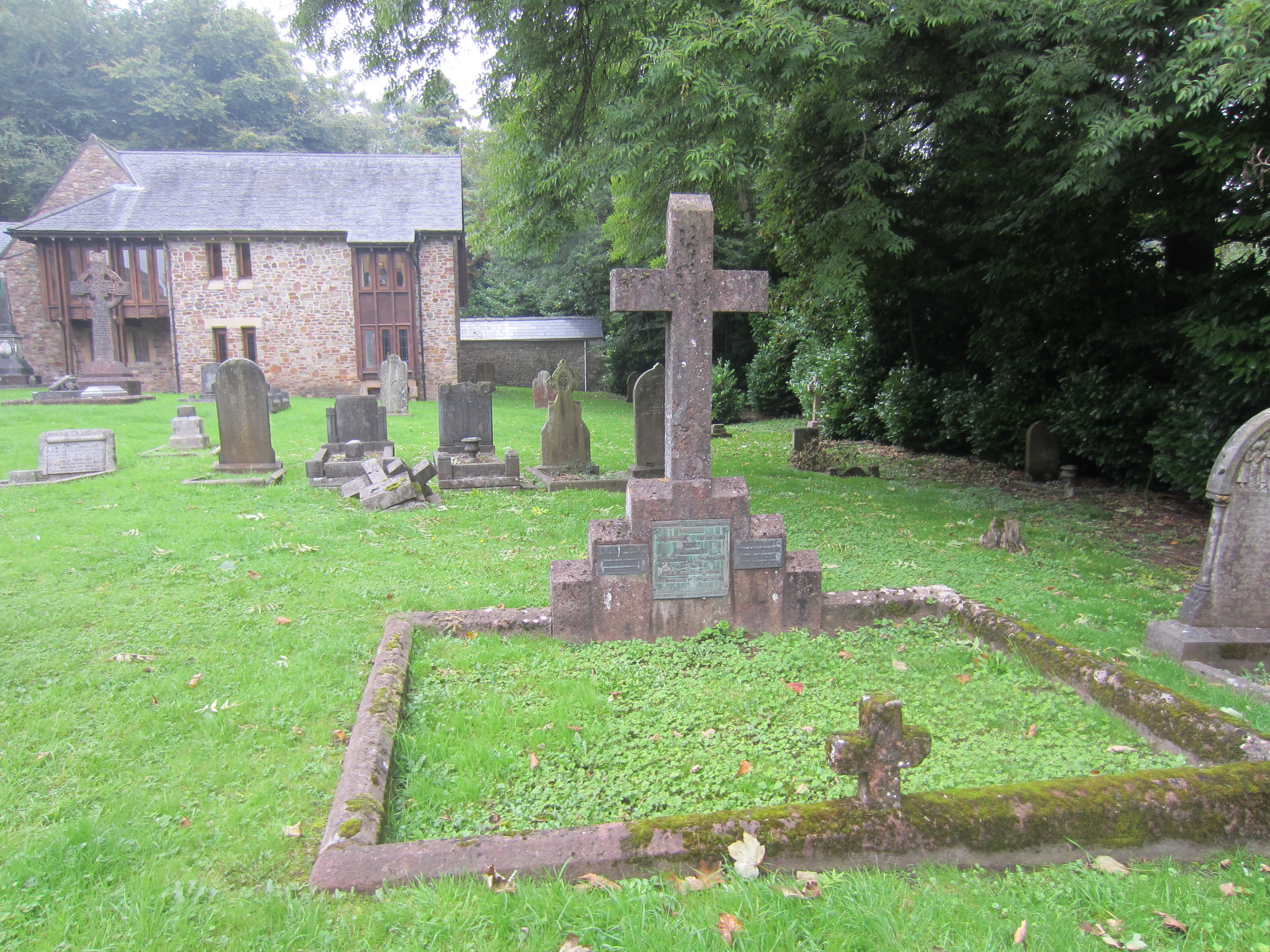

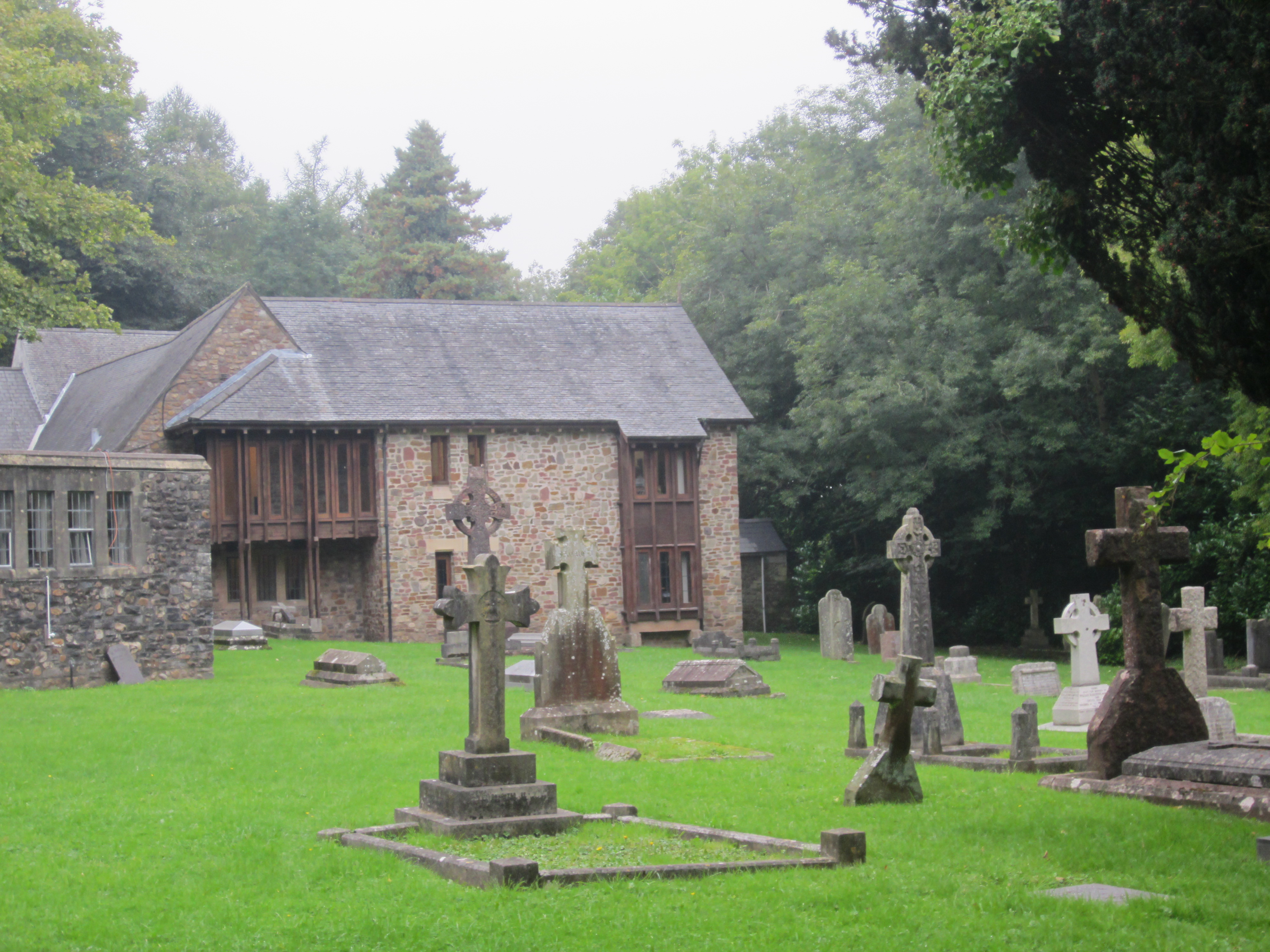

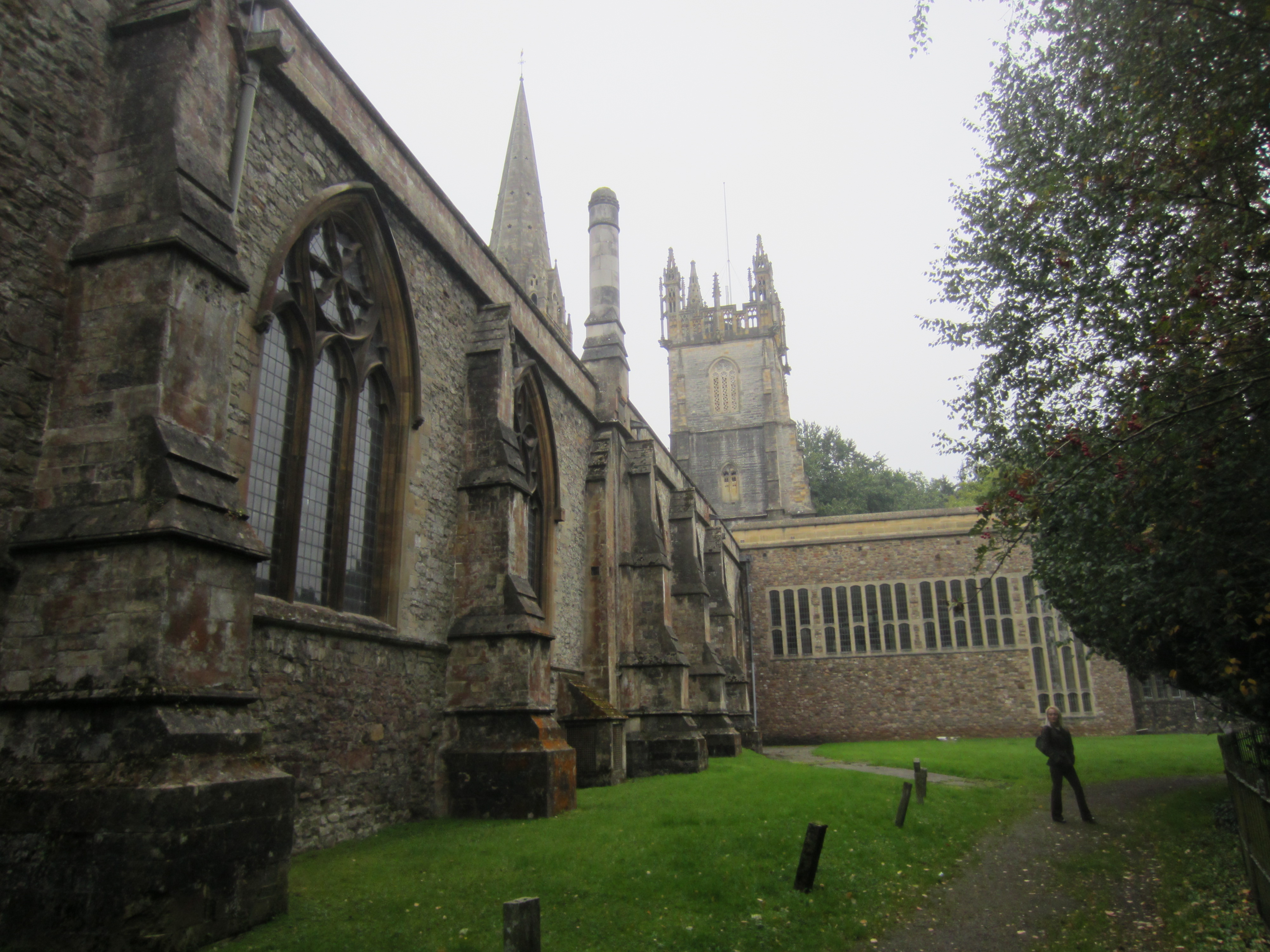

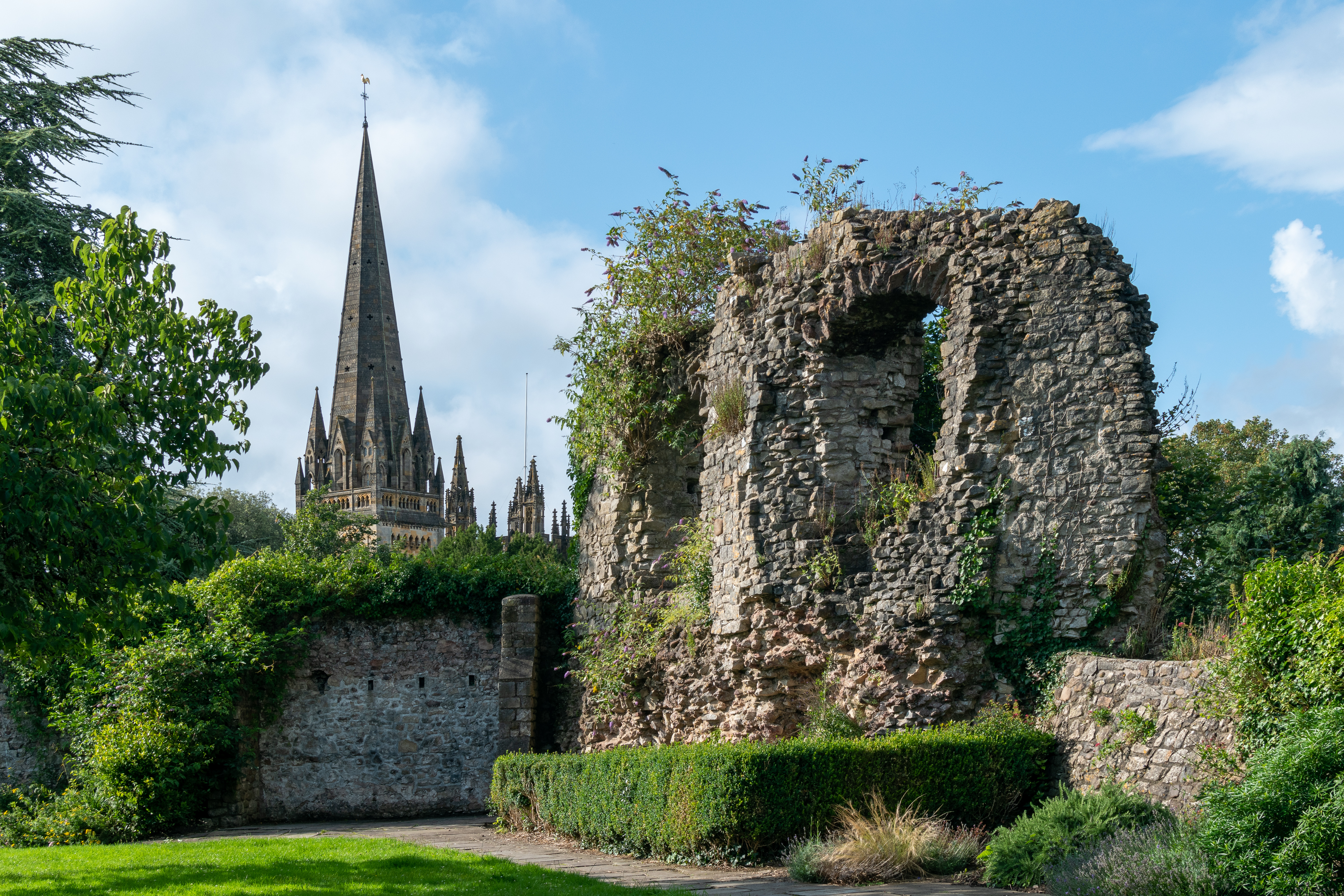

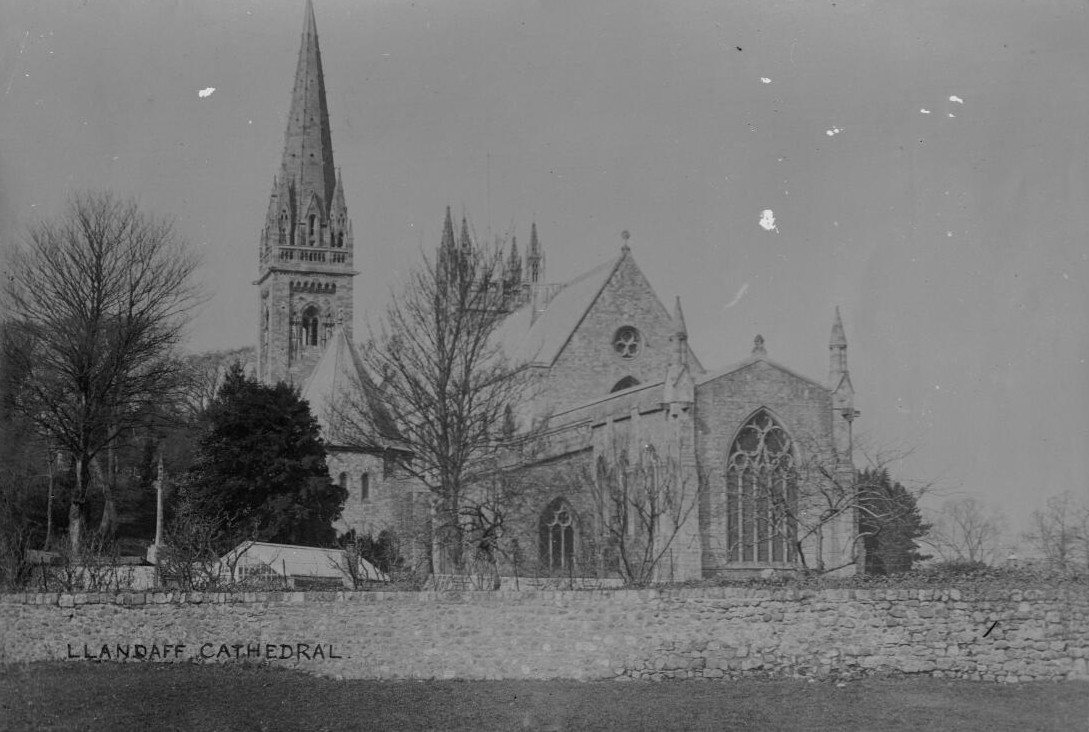
1905

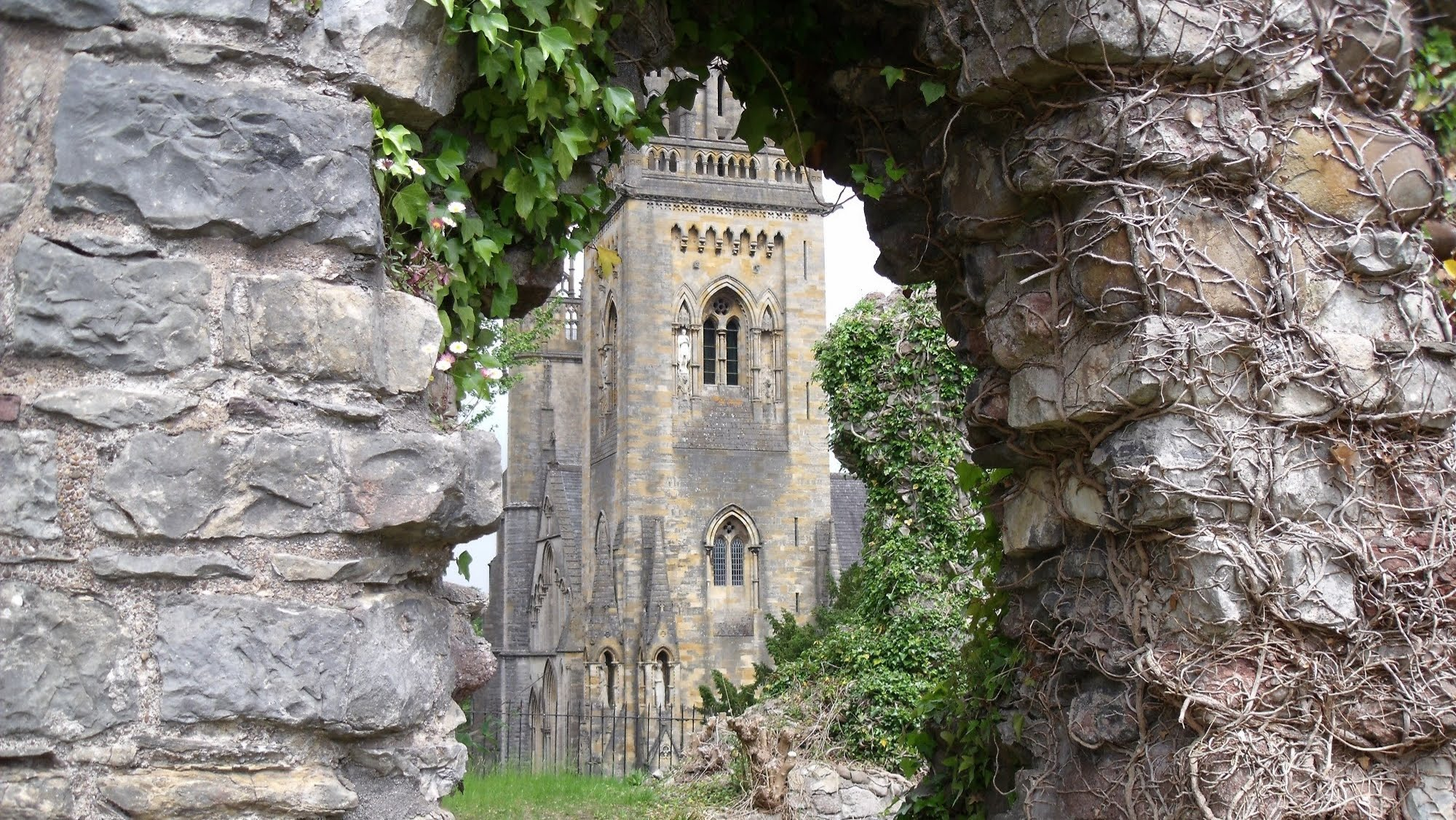

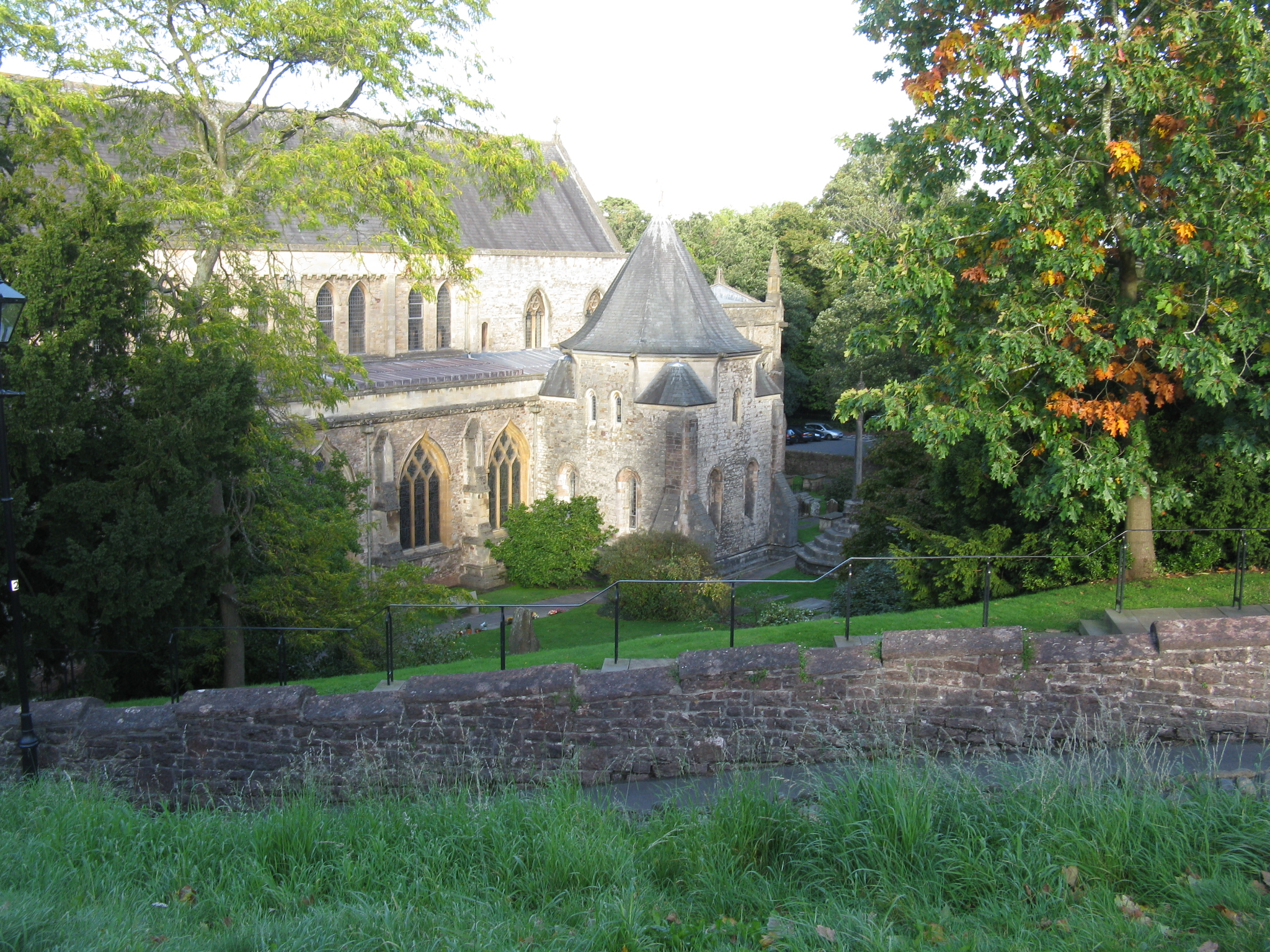
Cathedral Grounds

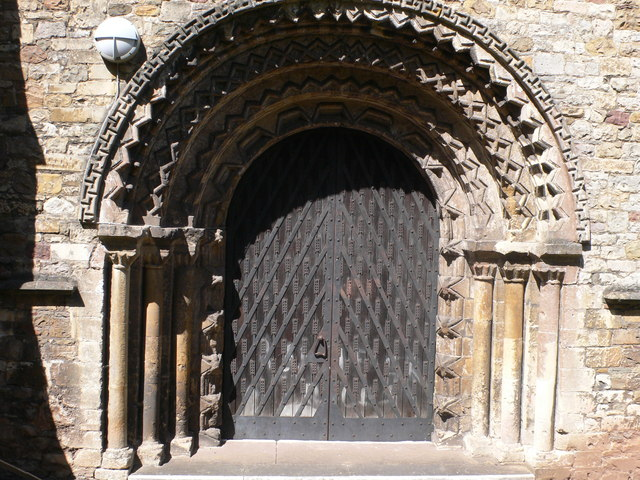
South Door

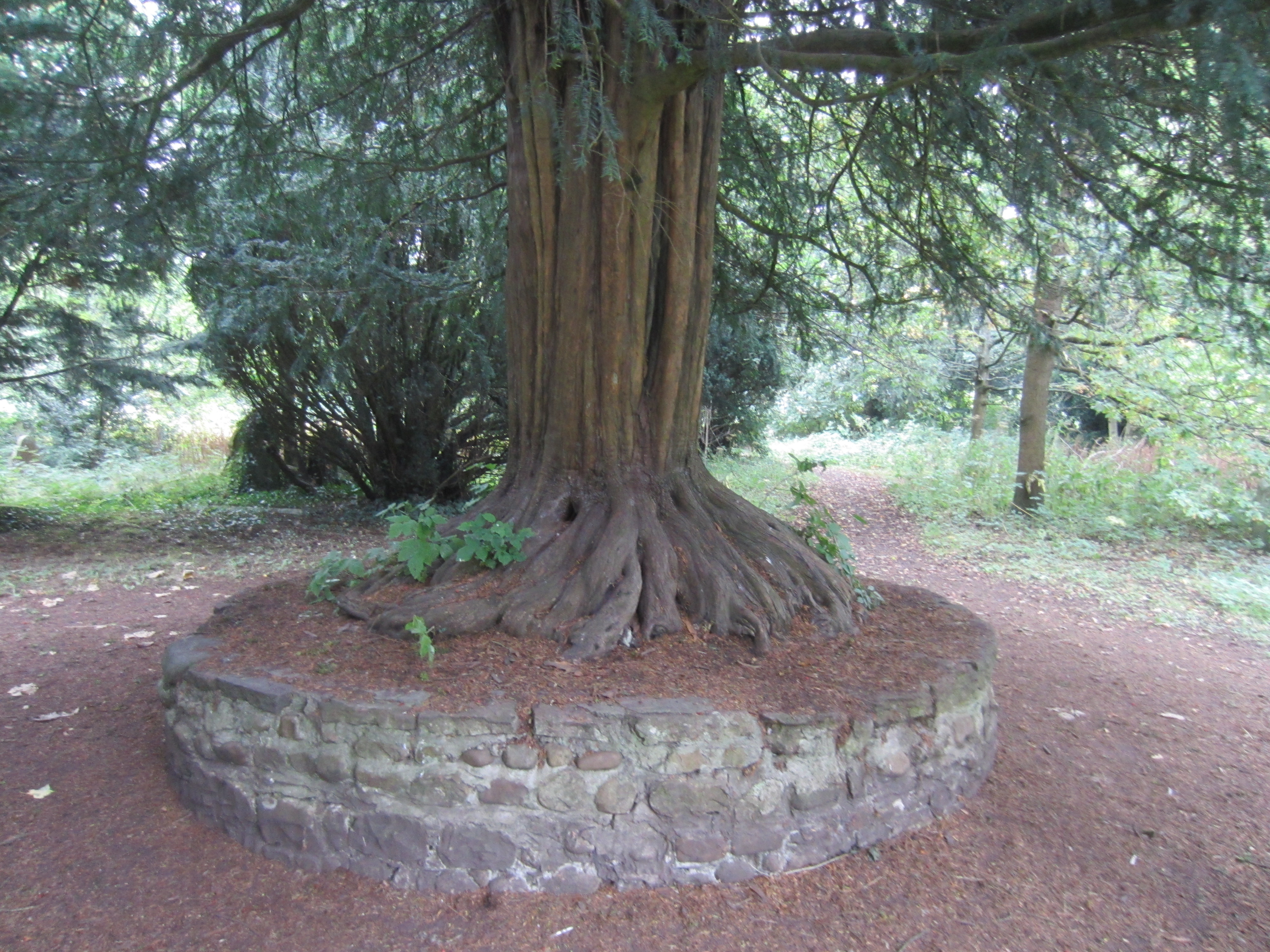

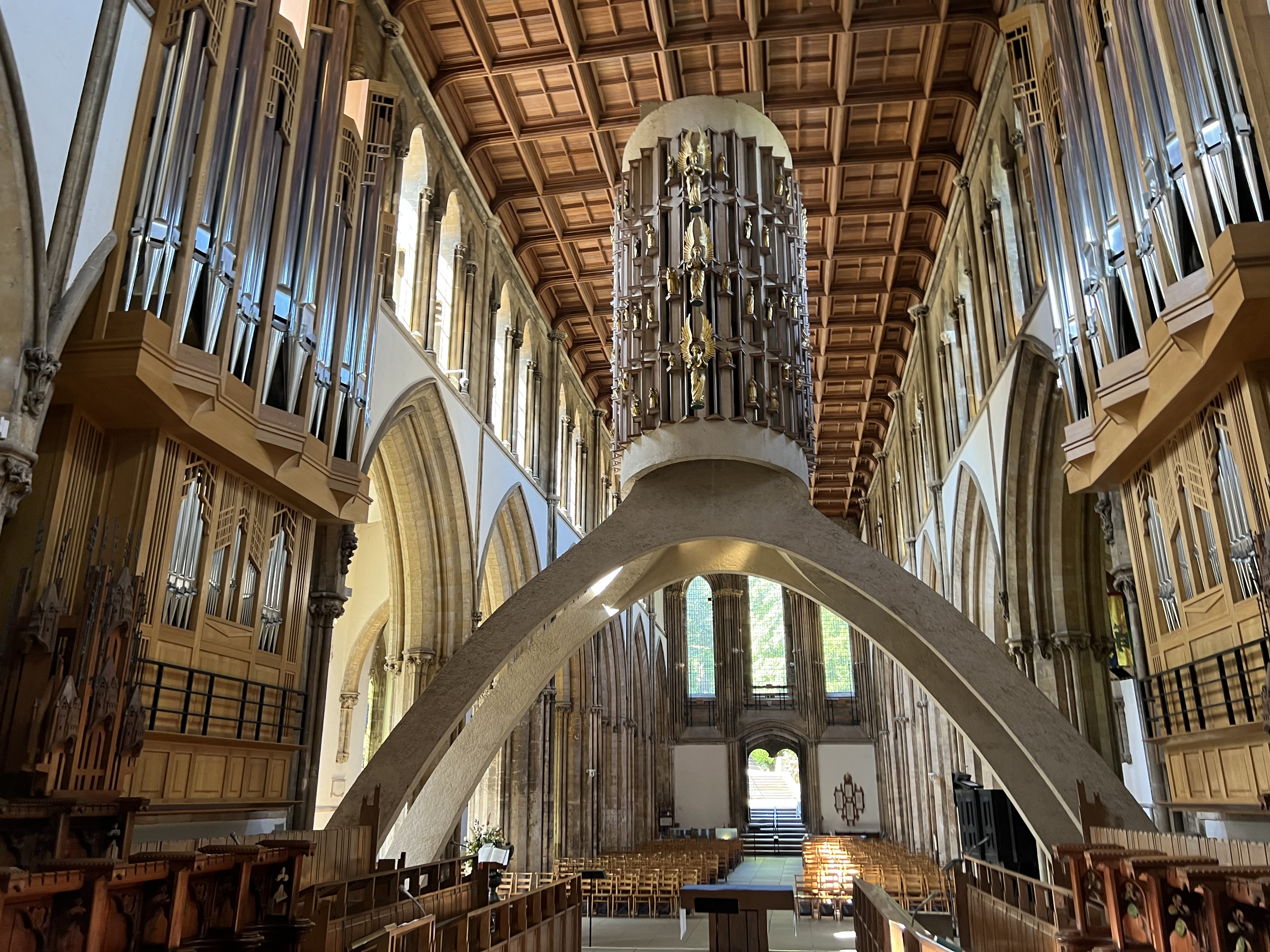

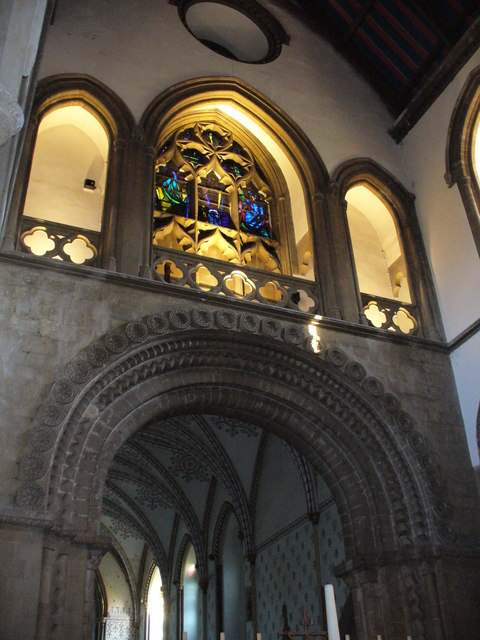

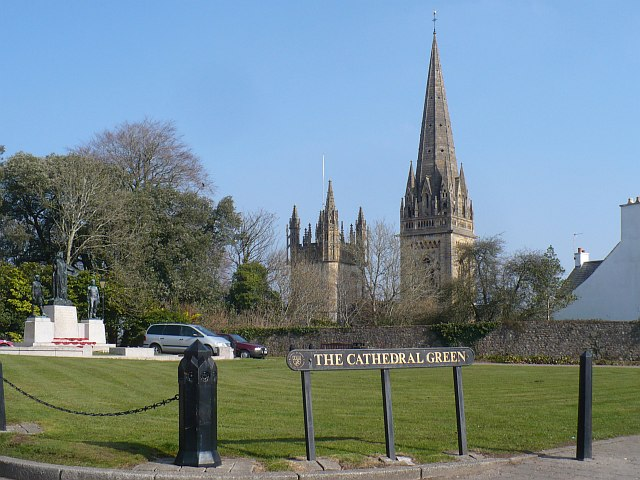

== See also ==
- List of cathedrals in Wales
- Dean of Llandaff – Chronological list of deans of Llandaff cathedral
- List of works by George Pace
- List of tallest buildings and structures in Cardiff
- Listed buildings in Cardiff

== Sources ==
- Bond, Francis (1912). The cathedrals of England and Wales : being a fourth edition of English cathedrals illustrated. B. T. Batsford. hdl:2027/uc1.b4687625.
- Clifton, A. B.; Willmott, Edmund Charles Morgan (1907). The cathedral church of Llandaff: a description of the building and a short history of the see, Volume 20. George Bell & Sons.
- Compton-Davies, William Rhys (1897). Historical & Pictorial Glimpses of Llandaff Cathedral: The Cathedral of S.S. Peter, Paul, Dubritius, Teleiau and Oudoceus. E. Dobbin. p. 67. "llandaff cathedral."
- Hackett, Maria (1823). A Brief Account of Cathedral and Collegiate Schools. J.B. Nichols. p. 36.
- Davies, John; Jenkins, Nigel; Baines, Menna (2008). The Welsh Academy encyclopaedia of Wales. University of Wales Press. ISBN 978-0-7083-1953-6.
- Davies, R. R. (1987). The Age of Conquest: Wales, 1063–1415. Oxford University Press. ISBN 978-0-1982-0878-5.
- Evans, Robert; Humphreys, Maggie (1997). Dictionary of Composers for the Church in Great Britain and Ireland. Bloomsbury Publishing. ISBN 978-1-4411-3796-8.
- Freeman, Edward Augustus (1850). Remarks on the Architecture of Llandaff Cathedral: With an Essay Towards a History of the Fabric. W. Pickering. "llandaff cathedral."
- Isaac, David Lloyd (1859). Siluriana; or, Contributions toward the history of Gwent & Glamorgan. W. Christophers.
- James, John Henry (1898). A history and survey of the cathedral church of SS. Peter, Paul, Dubritius, Teilo, and Oudoceus, Llandaff. Western Mail.
- Kay, Ernest (1985). International who's who in music and musicians' directory, Volume 10. Melrose Press. ISBN 9780900332777.
- King, Richard John (1873). Handbook to the Cathedrals of Wales: Llandafe, St David's, St Asaph, Bangor. Murray.
- Mowl, Tim; Earnshaw, Brian (1988). John Wood: Architect of Obsession. Millstream Books. ISBN 978-0-9489-7513-4.
- Newman, John; Hughes, Stephen R.; Ward, Anthony (1995). Glamorgan: (Mid Glamorgan, South Glamorgan and West Glamorgan). Yale University Press. ISBN 978-0-1407-1056-4.
- Ollivant, Alfred (1860). Some Account of the Condition of the Fabric of Llandaff Cathedral, from 1575 to the present time. Rivingtons.
- Pepin, David (2008). Discovering Cathedrals. Osprey Publishing. ISBN 978-0-7478-0597-7.
- Rees, W. J. (1840). The Liber landavensis, Llyfr Teilo: or, The ancient register of the cathedral church of Llandaff; from mss. in the libraries of Hengwrt, and of Jesus college, Oxford. W. Rees for Welsh MSS Society. "book of llandaff."
- Storer, James Sargant; Storer, Henry Sargeant (1817). History and Antiquities of the Cathedral Churches of Great Britain: Bath. Landaff. Bristol. St David's. St Paul's. Rochester. Ely. Rivingtons.
- Treuherz, Julian; Bendiner, Kenneth; Thirlwell, Angela (2011). Ford Madox Brown: Pre-Raphaelite Pioneer. Philip Wilson Publishers. ISBN 978-0-8566-7700-7.
- Varey, Simon (1990). Space and the Eighteenth-Century English Novel, Volume 1. Cambridge University Press. ISBN 978-0-5213-7483-5.
- Willis, Browne (1719). A Survey of the Cathedral-Church of Landaff. R. Gosling.
- Winks, Robin W. (1984). American's guide to Britain. Scribt. ISBN 978-0-6841-8067-0. "british cathedrals world war ii llandaff coventry."
