= List of collieries in the Rhondda Valleys =

The Rhondda Valleys were, between 1860 and 1939, one of the world's most important coal mining regions. The list below attempts to show a complete list of levels and collieries opened within the Rhondda. A level is seen as a horizontal cut into a hill or mountain to access a seam of coal, while a colliery consists of shafts mined into the earth to reach seams of coal underground.

== List entries ==
Colliery states the name the colliery or level was known as when it first opened; many sites were enlarged, and some levels were developed into collieries. If a site was expanded from a level to a colliery, or significant additional shafts were added, the column Formerly draws attention to the original site name.

The Date opened records the first attempt to open a level or pit at the site, though often the level or colliery was abandoned without production due to problems; which including flooding, financing or failure to reach a seam. The Original owner category lists the person or organisation that first attempted to open the mine, though again they may not have been the first person or group to successfully extract coal from the site. The Closed date is the year where the colliery or level stopped extracting coal, though many mines were kept open as ventilation or pumping shafts after they became economically nonviable.

Men employed returns the numbers of workers at each mine at the colliery's peak. This does not reflect the tonnage of coal extracted, just the numbers of men working. Many dates reoccur as these are the years when the Inspector of Mines took official head counts.

Number	Colliery	Formerly	Date opened	Original owner	Location	Closed	Men employed	Coal seam mined
1	Dinas Levels		1809	Walter Coffin	Dinas	Unknown	Unknown	Rhondda No. 2
2	Dinas Lower Colliery		1812	Walter Coffin	Dinas	1893	Unknown	Rhondda No. 3
3	Dinas Middle Colliery		1832	Walter Coffin	Dinas	1893	Unknown	Rhondda No. 3
4	Brithweunydd Level		1839	Walter Coffin	Trealaw	Unknown	Unknown	Unknown
5	South Cymmer Level		1841	Richard Lewis	Cymmer	Unknown	Unknown	Unknown
6	Nythbran Level		1844	Lewis Edwards/George Gethin	Porth	Unknown	Unknown	Unknown
7	Cymmer Level		1844	George Insole	Cymmer	Unknown	Unknown	Unknown
8	Gellifaelog Colliery		1845	Walter Coffin	Tonypandy	Unknown	Unknown	Unknown
	Newbridge Colliery		1845	John Calvert	Gelliwion, Pontypridd	1897	486 (1896)	Rhondda No. 3
9	Porth Colliery		1845	David W. James	Porth	Unknown	Unknown	Unknown
10	Troedyrhiw (Aber Rhondda) Colliery		1845	Leonard Hadley	Ynyshir	1901	130 (1896)	Rhondda No. 3
11	Ynyshir House		1845	Shepherd & Evans	Ynyshir	1909	55 (1908)	Rhondda No. 2
12	Perch Levels		1847	William Perch	Blaenclydach	Unknown	Unknown	Rhondda No. 2
13	Cymmer (Old) Colliery		1847	George Insole & Son	Cymmer	1940	780 (1918)	Rhondda No. 3
14	Coedcae Colliery		1850	Edward Mills	Trehafod	1935	585 (1923)	Rhondda No. 3
15	Hafod (Lewis Merthyr)		1850	D. & J. Thomas	Trehafod	1983	3288 (1918)	Two foot, Five feet, Six feet, Nine feet, Red, Gellideg
16	Llwyncelyn Colliery		1851	David W. James	Porth	1895	Unknown	Unknown
17	Rhondda Merthyr (Bute) Colliery		1851	Marquess of Bute	Treherbert	1926	801 (1918)	Seven feet
18	Upper Cymmer Colliery		1851	J.H. Insole	Cymmer	≤1918	182 (1896)	Unknown
19	Glynfach Colliery		1851	Issac Williams	Porth	Unknown	Unknown	Unknown
20	Tynewydd Colliery		1852	Cope, Lewis & Thomas	Porth	1901	118 (1896)	Rhondda No. 3
21	Lady Margaret Colliery		1853	Marquess of Bute	Treherbert	1940s	1053 (1938)	Six feet, Seven feet, Gorllwyn
22	New Cymmer Colliery		1855	J.H. Insole	Porth	1940	1636 (1923)	Five feet, Nine feet, Gellideg
23	Ellis Level		1855	Richard Ellis	Porth	Unknown	Unknown	Unknown
24	Tylecoch Colliery		1855	J.Carr, Morrsion & Co.	Treorchy	1930	Unknown	Unknown
25	Dunraven Levels		1856	Philip Taylor	Blaencwm	≤1930	478 (1918)	Rhondda No. 2
26	Gelligaled Colliery		1856	V. L. Lewis	Ystrad	Unknown	Unknown	Unknown
27	Tyntyla Level		1856	Robert Parsons	Ystrad	Unknown	Unknown	Unknown
28	Bodringallt Level		1856	D. Jones & D. James	Ystrad	Unknown	Unknown	Unknown
29	Blaenllechau Colliery		1857	D. Davies	Blaenllechau	1959	Unknown	Unknown
30	Pentre Level		1857	Edward Curtis	Pentre	Unknown	Unknown	Unknown
31	Church Level		1857	Edward Curtis	Pentre	Unknown	Unknown	Unknown
32	Penygraig Drift		1857	Thomas Ellis	Penygraig	Unknown	Unknown	Unknown
33	Dunraven Level		1858	Thomas Joseph	Blaencwm	Unknown	Unknown	Unknown
34	Graig Level		1858	Thomas Jones	Blaencwm	Unknown	Unknown	Unknown
35	Penygraig Level		1858	M. Rowlands	Penygraig	1919	220 (1896)	Rhondda No. 3
36	Cynllwyn Du Colliery		1858	Thomas Wayne	Tylorstown	1936		Gellideg seam
37	Ynysfeio Colliery		1859	Troedyrhiw Colliery Coal Co.	Treherbert	1930s	1382 (1923)	Gorllwyn, Four Foot, Five Foot, Seven Foot
38	Llwynypia Level		1859	Isaac Smith	Llwynypia	Unknown	Unknown	Unknown
39	Abergorchy Level		1859	Huxham, Hopkin & Morgan	Treorchy	1935	2278 (1908)	Rhondda No. 3
40	Glyncoli Level		1860	C James	Treorchy	Unknown	Unknown	Unknown
41	Bwllfa Level		1862	Richardson & Carr	Ton Pentre	Unknown	Unknown	Unknown
42	Brithweunydd Level		1862	Daniel Thomas	Trealaw	Unknown	Unknown	Unknown
43	Glamorgan (Llwynypia) Colliery (No. 1 & 2)		1863	Glamorgan Coal Co.	Llwynypia	1945	Unknown	Rhondda No. 2 and No. 3
44	Blaenclydach Colliery		1863	Bush & Co.	Blaenclydach	1947	606 (1923)	Pentre seam
45	Pentre Colliery	Pentre Level	1864	Curteis, Greenhill & Ware	Pentre	1929	1190 (1908)	Five feet, Yard seam, Bute seam
46	Bodringallt Colliery		1864	Warner, Simpson & Co.	Ystrad	1936	930 (1896)	Six feet, Nine feet, Two feet, Red seam
47	Cwmclydach Colliery		1864	D. & E. Thomas	Cwmclydach	c. 1895	Unknown	Unknown
48	Tydraw Colliery	Dunraven Level	1865	Thomas Joseph	Blaencwm	1959	1049 (1923)	Four feet, Five feet, Six feet, Gorllwyn, Yard seam
49	Tynewydd Colliery		1865	Ebenezer Lewis	Tynewydd	1911	Unknown	Number 2, Four and Six feet
50	Parc Colliery		1865	D. Davies & Partners	Cwmparc	1966	2000+ (1945)	Two feet Nine, Six feet, Garw, New seam
51	Maendy (Maindy) Colliery		1865	D. Davies & Partners	Ton Pentre	1948	1155 (1896)	Two feet Nine, Seven feet, Bute, New seam
52	Adare Colliery		1866	Daniel Thomas	Penygraig	Unknown	Unknown	Unknown
53	Ynyswen Level		1869	Morgan Jones	Treorchy	Unknown	Unknown	Unknown
54	Dinas Colliery		1869	Daniel Thomas	Dinas	Unknown	Unknown	Unknown
55	Blaenrhondda (Dunraven) Colliery		1869	Cardiff & Merthyr Steam Co.	Blaenrhondda	1920s	386 (1908)	Rhondda No. 2
56	Gelli Colliery		1870	E. Thomas & G. Griffiths	Gelli	1962	905 (1908)	Seven feet, Five feet, Yard seam, Pentre seam
57	Dare Colliery		1870	D. Davies and Co.	Cwmparc	1966	1121 (1923)	Six feet, Three feet Ten, Red seam, Brunt, Little
58	Trealaw (Llwynypia No. 3) Colliery		1872		Trealaw	≤1918	Unknown	Rhondda No. 3
59	Glynmoch Colliery		1872		Treorchy	Unknown	Unknown	Unknown
60	Fernhill Colliery		1872	Ebenezer Lewis	Blaenrhondda	1978	1712 (1938)	Gorllwyn, Four feet, Two Feet Nine
61	Clydach Vale (Cambrian) Colliery (No. 1)		1872	S. Thomas & J. Riches	Clydach Vale	1965	1933 (1923)	Pentre seam, Five feet, Coronation
62	Llwynypia Colliery (No. 4 & 5)		1872	Glamorgan Coal Co.	Llwynypia	Unknown	Unknown	Unknown
63	Pendyrys Colliery		1874	Tylor Colliery Co.	Tylorstown	1936		
64	Clydach Vale (Cambrian) Colliery (No. 2)		1874	Samuel Thomas & J. Riches	Clydach Vale	1965	1253 (1923)	Nine feet
65	Mardy Colliery		1875	M. Jones & W. Cobb	Maerdy	1985	2024 (1918)	Four, Five, Six and Nine feet, Red, Abagorki, Gorllwyn, New and Bute seams
66	Standard Colliery		1875	Ynyshir Steam Coal Co.	Ynyshir	1968	1454 (1908)	Four foot
67	Tynybedw Colliery		1876	E. Thomas & G. Griffiths	Pentre	1933	787 (1908)	Nine feet, Seven feet
68	Eastern Colliery		1877	D. Davies & Co.	Pentre	1948	923 (1923)	Bute seam, Lower seam
69	Cymmer Colliery	Cymmer (Old) Colliery	1877	G. Insole & Son	Porth	1940	2331 (1914)	Five feet, Nine feet, Hafod seam, Gellideg seam
70	Pandy Colliery (Naval No. 1)		1879	Naval Colliery Co.	Tonypandy	1958	699 (1896)	Pentre
71	National Colliery (Cwch)		1880	M. Cope & H. Tennet	Wattstown	1968	1500 (1905)	Nine feet, Five feet, Gellideg
72	Ely Colliery (Naval No. 2)		1880	New Naval Colliery Co.	Penygraig	c. 1928	699 (1896)	Nine feet, Bute, Pentre
73	Dinas Colliery		1881	Dinas Steam Coal Co.	Dinas	Unknown	Unknown	Unknown
74	Merthyr Navigation	Hafod	1881	William Thomas Lewis	Trehafod	1983	3844	Five feet, Six feet, Nine feet, Gellideg, Red seam, Two foot Nine
75	Clydach Vale (Cambrian) Colliery (No. 3)		1891	Cambrian Colliery Co,	Clydach Vale	1936	Unknown	Pentre seam, Five feet, Coronation
76	Nantgwyn Colliery (Naval No. 3)		1892	Naval Colliery Co,	Penygraig	≤1945	1333 (1923)	Four feet, Six feet, Nine Feet, Bute seam
77	Hendrewen (Glenrhondda) Colliery		1899	Glenavon Garw Colliery Co.	Blaencwm	1966	434 (1923)	Rhondda No. 2, Gorllwyn
78	Lady Lewis Colliery		1904	Lewis MErthyr Consolidated Collieries Co,	Ynyshir	1930s	1265 (1923)	Two feet Nine, Four feet, Six feet, Nine feet, Red
79	Anthony Colliery (Naval No. 4)		1910	Naval Colliery Co,	Tonypandy	1958	Unknown	Pentre seam

== Bibliography ==
- Carpenter, David J. (2000). Rhondda Collieries. Stroud, Gloucestershire: Tempus Publishing. ISBN 0-7524-1730-4.
- May, John (2003). Rhondda 1203 - 2003: The Story of the Two Valleys. Caerphilly: Castle Publications. ISBN 1-871354-09-9.
