= Church of St Stephen, Ystrad =

Church in Ystrad Rhondda, Wales

St Stephen's Church, Ystrad Rhondda
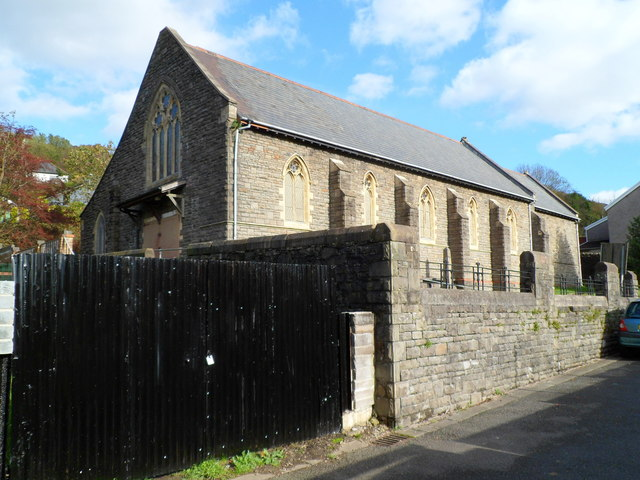
- St Stephen's Church, Ystrad Rhondda
- 51.644684°N 3.462615°W
- Denomination: Church in Wales
- Previous denomination: Church of England (pre-1920)

History
- Status: Active
- Founded: 1895
- Dedication: Saint Stephen

Architecture
- Functional status: Parish church
- Architect: E. M. Bruce Vaughan
- Architectural type: Church
- Style: Early English Gothic Revival
- Years built: 1895–1896
- Groundbreaking: 1895
- Completed: May 1896
- Construction cost: £3,600

Administration
- Province: Church in Wales
- Diocese: Diocese of Llandaff
- Archdeaconry: Archdeaconry of Margam
- Parish: Trealaw with Ystrad Rhondda with Ynyscynon

St Stephen's Church is a Church in Wales parish church in Ystrad Rhondda, Wales, within the Rhondda Cynon Taf county borough. Built between 1895 and 1896, the church opened in May 1896. Designed by E. M. Bruce Vaughan in the Early English Gothic Revival style, it cost £3,600 to construct.

Today, St Stephen's operates as part of the Church in Wales Ministry Area of the Rhondda within the Diocese of Llandaff.

== History ==
St Stephen's Church was established during the second phase of urban expansion in Ystrad Rhondda, coinciding with local coal mining operations. By the 1890s the area had been transformed from agricultural land into a colliery district of the Cory Brothers of Cardiff.

The church's construction responded to population growth in the ancient parish of Ystradyfodwg.

The Taff Vale Railway reached Ystrad in 1861, with the station initially named Ystradyfodwg before being renamed Ystrad Rhondda railway station in 1930. Building clubs of colliery workers constructed housing developments from 1884 onwards along Ystrad Road, Llywellyn Street, and Carne Street.

E. M. Bruce Vaughan designed the church in the Early English Gothic Revival style. Vaughan later designed the Gothic central tower of the Institute of Physiology, now incorporated into the South Building of Cardiff University's Queen's Buildings. The cost of construction was £3,600.

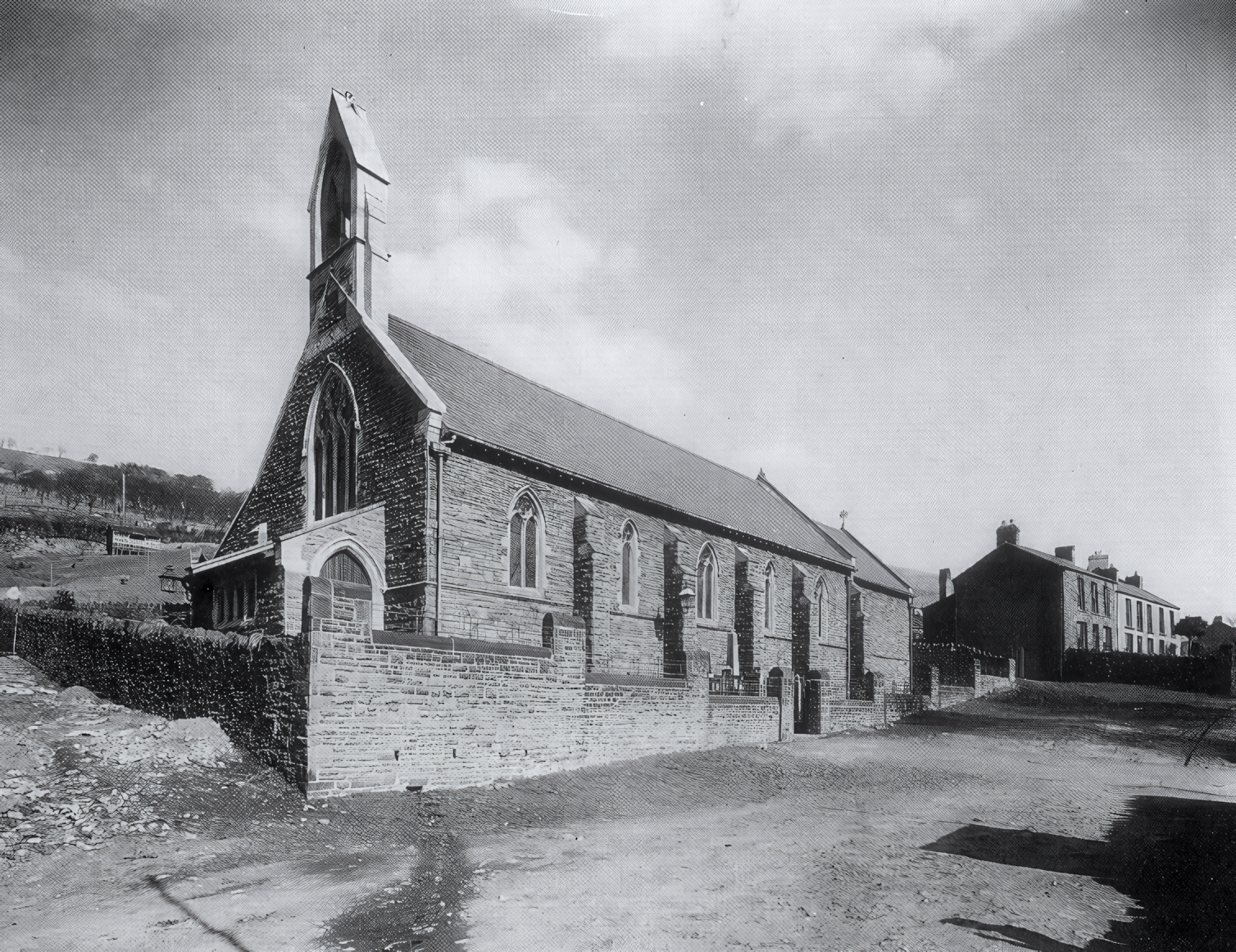
St Stephen's Church in 1910

The church opened in May 1896. Ystrad Library had been built the previous year (1895, costing £3,000).

=== Ecclesiastical developments ===
The Welsh Church Act 1914 disestablished the Church in Wales from the Church of England, making St Stephen's part of the newly independent Church in Wales under the Diocese of Llandaff.

In 1897, the civil parish was renamed from Ystradyfodwg to Rhondda, effective 1 July of that year.

== Architecture ==
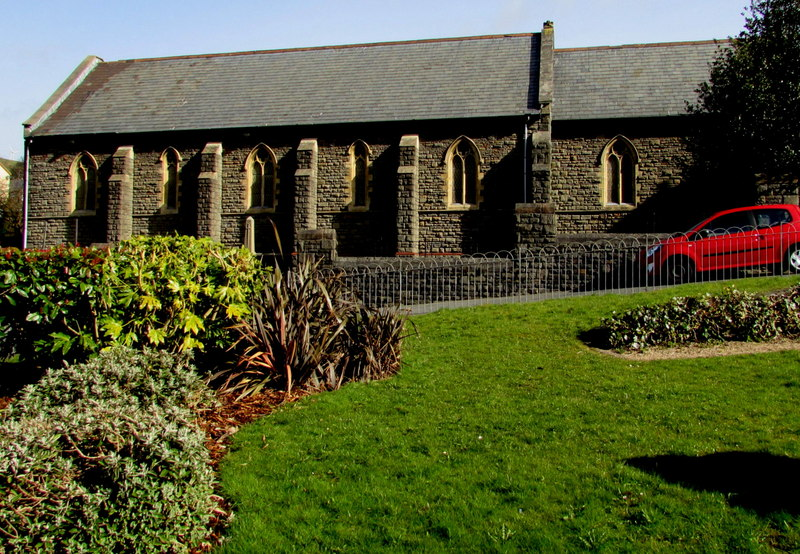
Church of St Stephen, Ystrad Rhondda – exterior view

St Stephen's Church is built in the Early English Gothic Revival style, with pointed arches and vertical lines.

Contemporary buildings in the area, such as Ystrad Library, were constructed of brick with stone dressings. Building materials came from local operations including the Bodringallt brick works.

=== Location and setting ===
The church is at the junction of Penrhys Road and Tyntyla Road on Church Street, Ystrad Rhondda.

The building sits within the Rhondda Special Historic Landscape, recognised in the national Register of Landscapes of Historic Interest in Wales.

== Parish life and community role ==
St Stephen's operates within the Ministry Area of the Rhondda, a modern ecclesiastical structure encompassing fourteen churches across the valley communities. The church forms part of the parish of "Trealaw with Ystrad Rhondda with Ynyscynon" under the Diocese of Llandaff.

=== Mining community heritage ===
The church served communities connected to coal mining operations in the Ystrad area, where collieries belonged to the Cory Brothers of Cardiff.

=== Religious landscape ===
The area was home to Nebo Baptist Church, founded in 1786 as the Ynysfach Baptist Meeting House and regarded as the first Baptist chapel in the Rhondda. Other non-conformist denominations, including Methodist, Baptist, and Welsh Presbyterian congregations, were also active in the region.

== Heritage ==
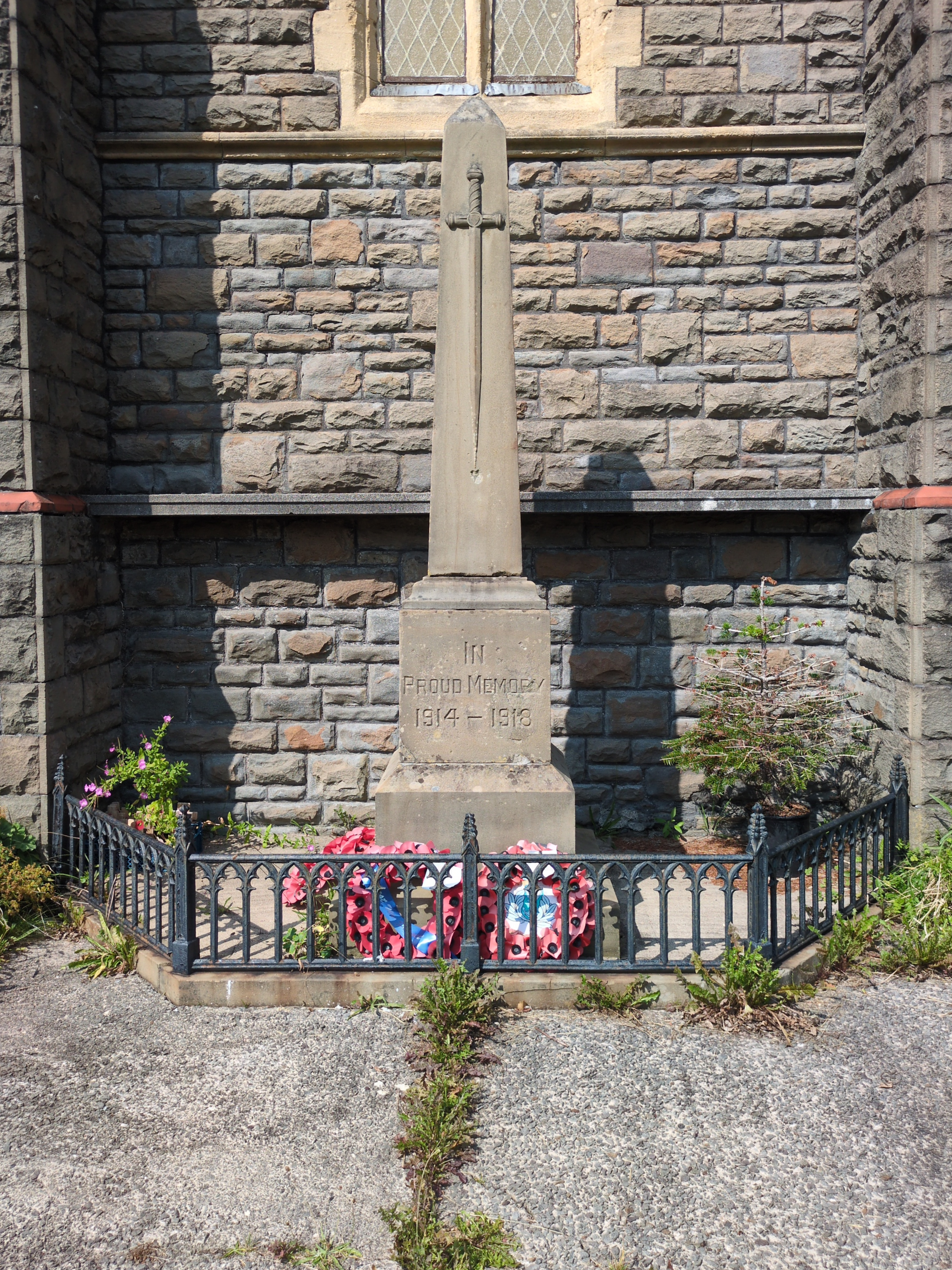
War memorial at St Stephen's Church, commemorating local soldiers who fell in the First World War

The church is within the area covered by Rhondda Cynon Taf's Heritage Strategy 2024–2030, which was supported by a £250,000 National Lottery Heritage Fund grant. The strategy states that it aims to "celebrate and value the rich heritage of Rhondda Cynon Taf by showcasing our cultural legacy". A "Rhondda Cynon Taf: Our Heritage" website was launched in November 2024, featuring historic photographs and resident interviews.
