= Ystrad =

Village in Rhondda Cynon Taf, Wales

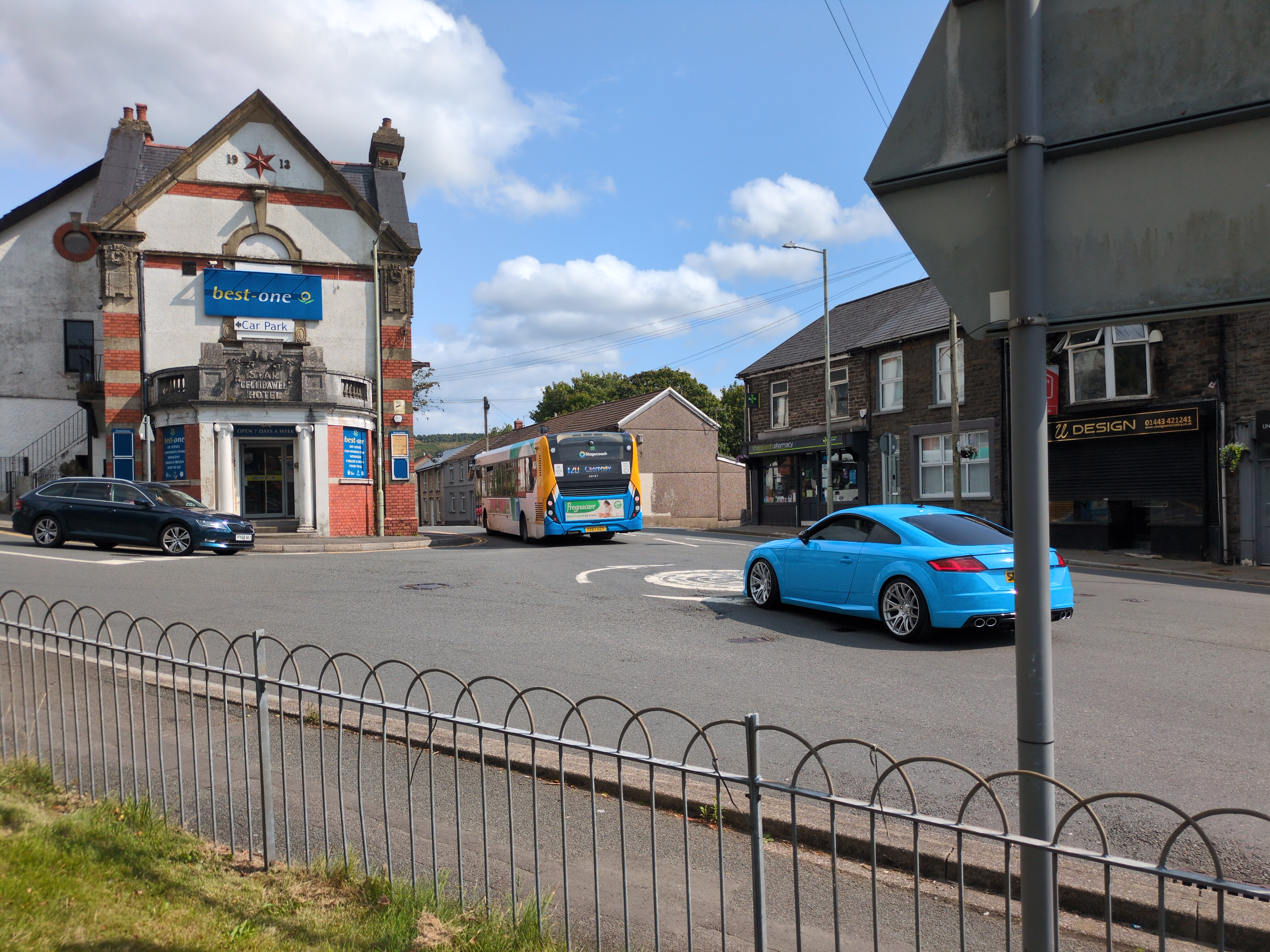
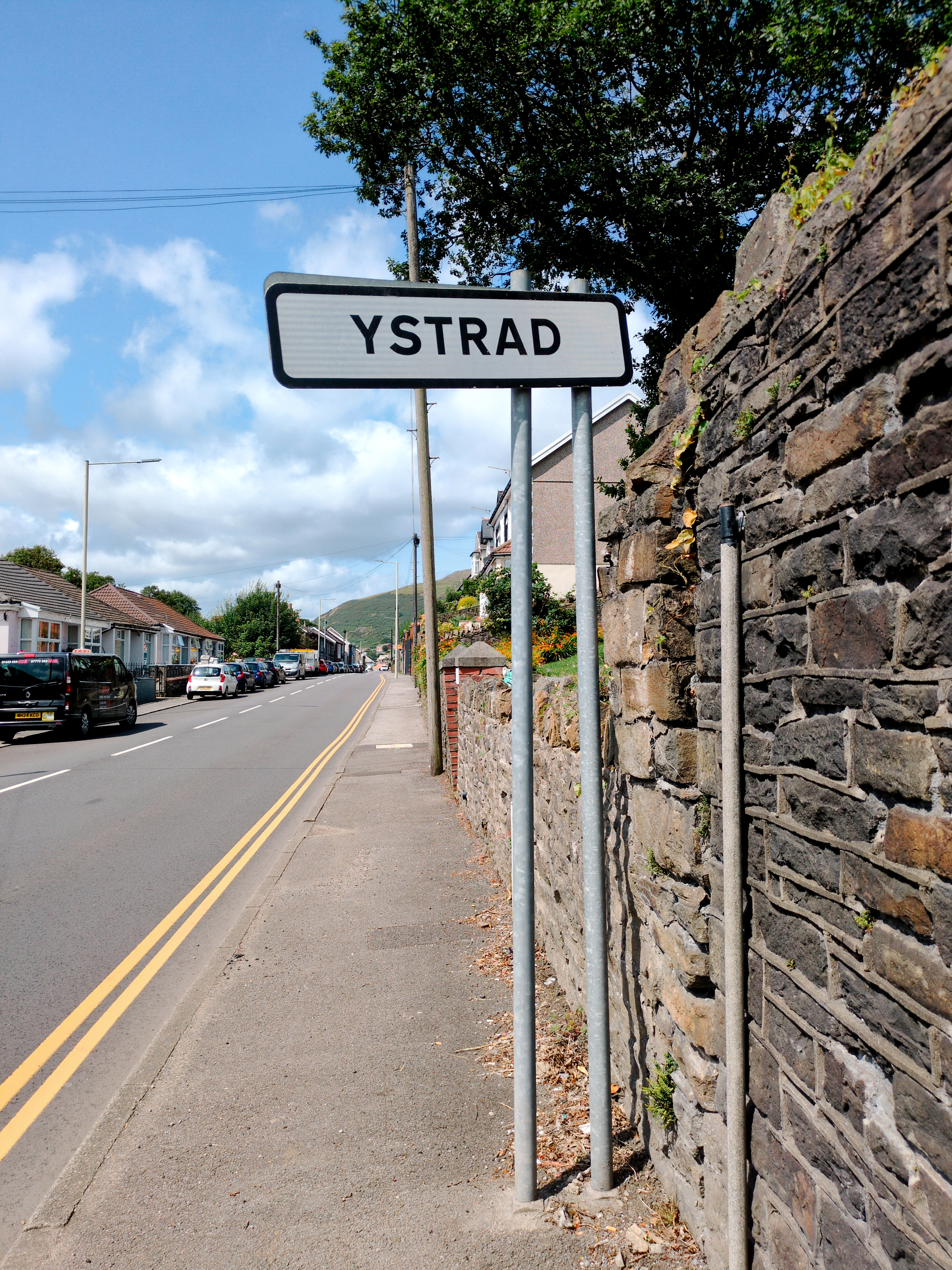
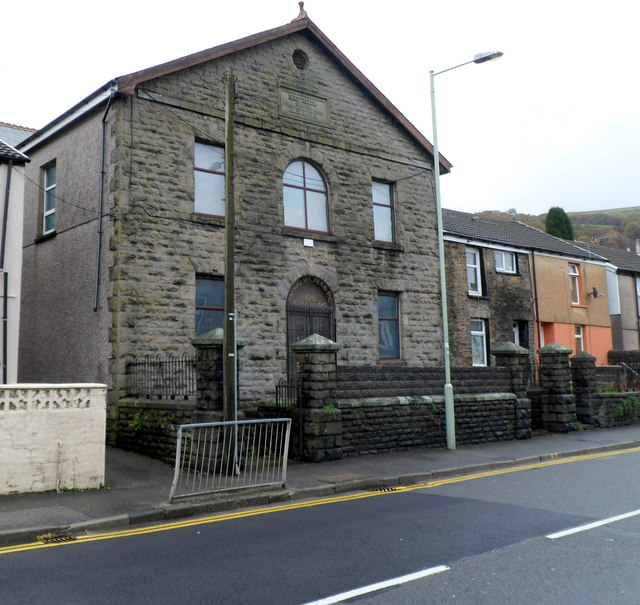
- From the top: the Star Hotel in Ystrad village square, Ystrad street sign, Ystrad Boys Club

- Location within Rhondda Cynon Taf
- Population: 5,075 (2021)
- OS grid reference: SS994947
- Principal area: Rhondda Cynon Taf
- Preserved county: Mid Glamorgan
- Country: Wales
- Sovereign state: United Kingdom
- Post town: PENTRE
- Postcode district: CF41
- Dialling code: 01443
- Police: South Wales
- Fire: South Wales
- Ambulance: Welsh
- UK Parliament: Rhondda
- Senedd Cymru – Welsh Parliament: Rhondda
- List of places UK Wales Rhondda Cynon Taf 51.642827°N 3.453853°W Community map: Map of the community

Ystrad (Welsh pronunciation: [ˈəstrad]), also known as Ystrad Rhondda or Ystrad-Rhondda, is a village, community and electoral ward situated in the Rhondda Fawr valley, within the Rhondda Cynon Taf county borough of Wales. As of the 2021 census, the population stood at 5,075. The village lies in the historic county of Glamorgan and forms part of the South Wales Valleys, a region shaped by intensive industrial development during the 19th and 20th centuries. It is served by Ystrad Rhondda railway station on the Rhondda Line and is connected by road and bus services to nearby towns and Cardiff.

Historically part of the extensive parish of Ystradyfodwg, Ystrad remained a rural and agricultural area until the mid-19th century, when the discovery and exploitation of coal brought rapid industrial growth. The sinking of Bodringallt Colliery in 1864 brought rapid industrial growth to the village, and the associated brickworks became one of the largest in the region. Although the colliery closed in 1959, Ystrad retains many features of its industrial past, including characteristic South Wales Valleys terraced housing and post-industrial landscapes that have since been regenerated.

The village is home to Ystrad Rhondda RFC, which plays in the Welsh Rugby Union WRU Admiral Premiership, and to the Rhondda Sports Centre. Ystrad is the location of Nebo Chapel, the first Baptist chapel in the Rhondda Valley, established in 1786.

== Toponymy ==
Ystrad is Welsh for "vale". "Ystrad" is in Welsh "Yr Ystrad", with the definite article. It is a short form of the village name Ystradyfodwg or Ystrad-dyfodwg ("vale of Tyfodwg", the name of a saint) which gave its name to an extensive parish, and from 1887 the name of a local government district, renamed as "Rhondda" in 1897.

The Taff Vale railway station at Ystradyfodwg, opened in 1861, was given the short name "Ystrad". In 1930 it was renamed Ystrad Rhondda, possibly to avoid confusion with other stations with "ystrad" (Ystradmynach and Ystradgynlais).

Ystrad Rhondda is "the Ystrad which is the Rhondda district". Sometimes Ystrad Rhondda is said to mean "Vale of the Rhondda" but this is not the correct explanation.

Historically, the area was also known as Ynys Fach, meaning "a low-lying meadowland near a river", and early Ordnance Survey maps record the name Heol Fach for the settlement. John Speed's 1611 map of Glamorgan identifies the area as Llanwynnyo.

== History ==
=== Pre-industrial period ===
The early history of Ystrad is closely linked to the broader story of the Ystradyfodwg parish, of which it formed part. The area was mentioned as early as 1538 by the traveller John Leland, who described "Glin Rodenay" (the Rhondda) as having but one parish, "Ystrate". Ystrad's early importance came from its position at the meeting point of ancient paths and tracks through the Rhondda, including the main cart track over Penrhys to the Rhondda Fach valley.

Prior to the industrial transformation of the 19th century, the area was characterised by scattered farming settlements and heavily wooded valleys. Through the post-medieval period, the Rhondda was described as being "heavily wooded" with the main economic activity being "the rearing of sheep, horses and cattle". The historian Rice Merrick noted there "was always great breeding of cattle, horses and sheep; but in elder time therein grew but small store of corn, for in most places there the ground was not thereunto apt".

Before urban development, the Ystrad area was held by five different estates with no single dominant interest, and settlement eventually expanded to take in the low-lying pasture of farms including Ty-isaf, Tyr Melin-yr-Om, Ty'n-tyle, Gelli Dawel and Bodringyll. An early description of pre-industrial Ystrad was provided by C.F. Cliffe, who stayed at a "primitive hostelrie" called the "Gellidawel" (quiet grove), which served as a meeting place for local farmers to conduct business.

The old mill of Melin-yr-Om was associated with the Cistercian grange of Llantarnam at Mynachdy Penrhys, indicating the area's early monastic connections.

Local legends surround Bodringallt House, the former manor house of the area, with some claiming it was the abode of "Cadwgan of the Battle Axe" and that it was connected to the monastery at Penrhys via an underground tunnel.

The first Baptist chapel in the Rhondda, Nebo (originally Ynysfach Chapel), was built in 1786 at a cost of £60, according to local records.

=== Industrial development ===
The transformation of Ystrad from a rural farming community began in the mid-19th century with the exploitation of the area's coal reserves. The historic landscape area of Ystrad and Pentre originated as a linear ribbon settlement along the main road through the Rhondda Fawr during the 1860s.

Bodringallt Colliery was sunk in 1864 by Warner Simpson and Company, producing over 34,000 tons of coal within its first year. The colliery passed through several ownerships, being purchased in 1890 by David Davies and Sons, Ferndale, who renamed it Ferndale No. 3 Colliery. Eventually, it came under the ownership of the Cory Brothers & Co. Ltd, who operated it until nationalisation in 1947, after which it was run by the National Coal Board until its closure in 1959.

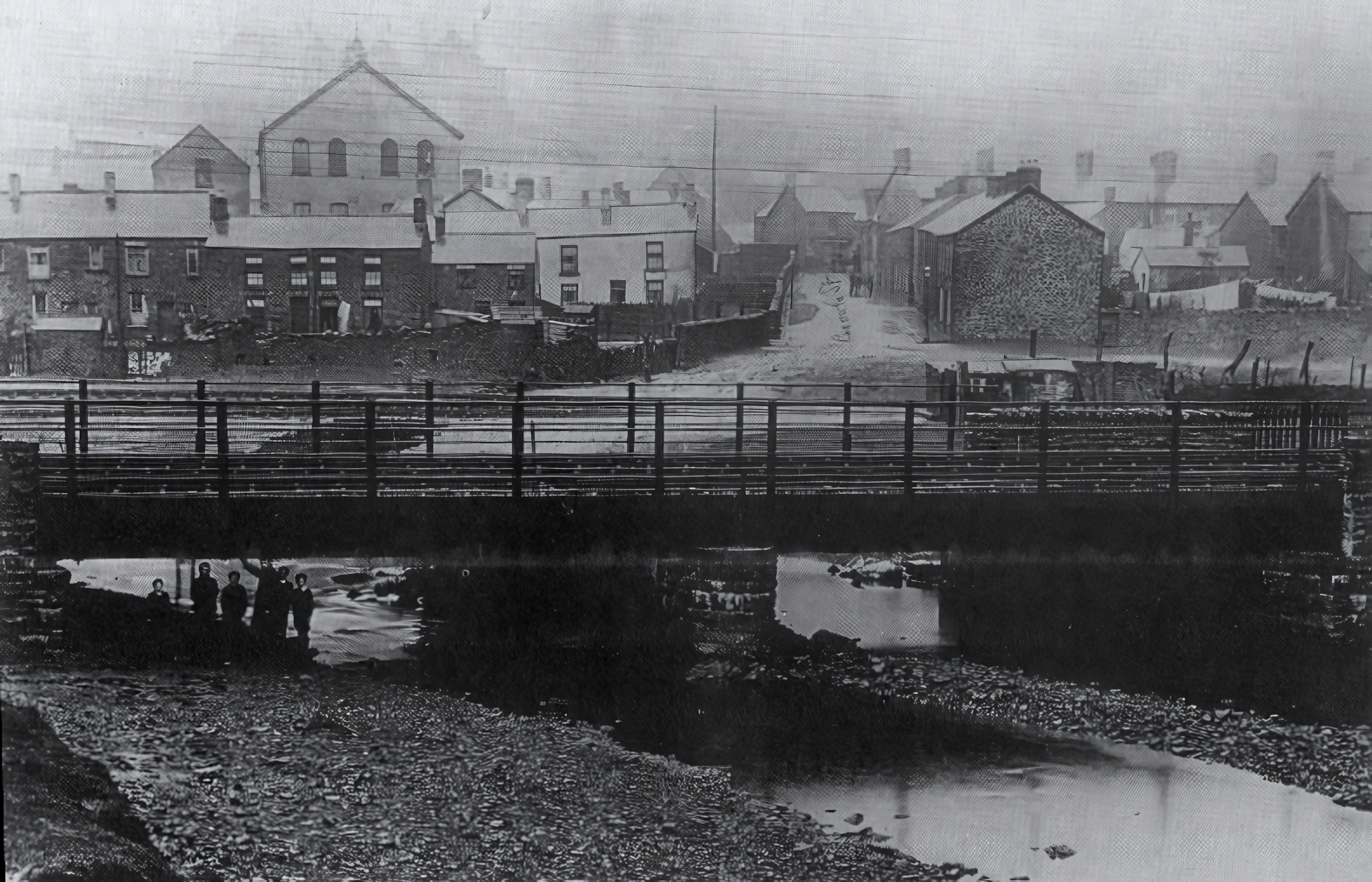
The heavily soiled Rhondda in 1910, with Gelligaled Road in the background

Associated with the colliery was the Bodringallt brick works, which became the second largest producer of bricks in the Rhondda after Llwynypia. The brickworks were set up in 1857 and exported throughout the South Wales coalfield, providing materials for shaft lining and the construction of colliery buildings and houses. A notable feature of the brickworks was its employment of a large number of girls from the local area.

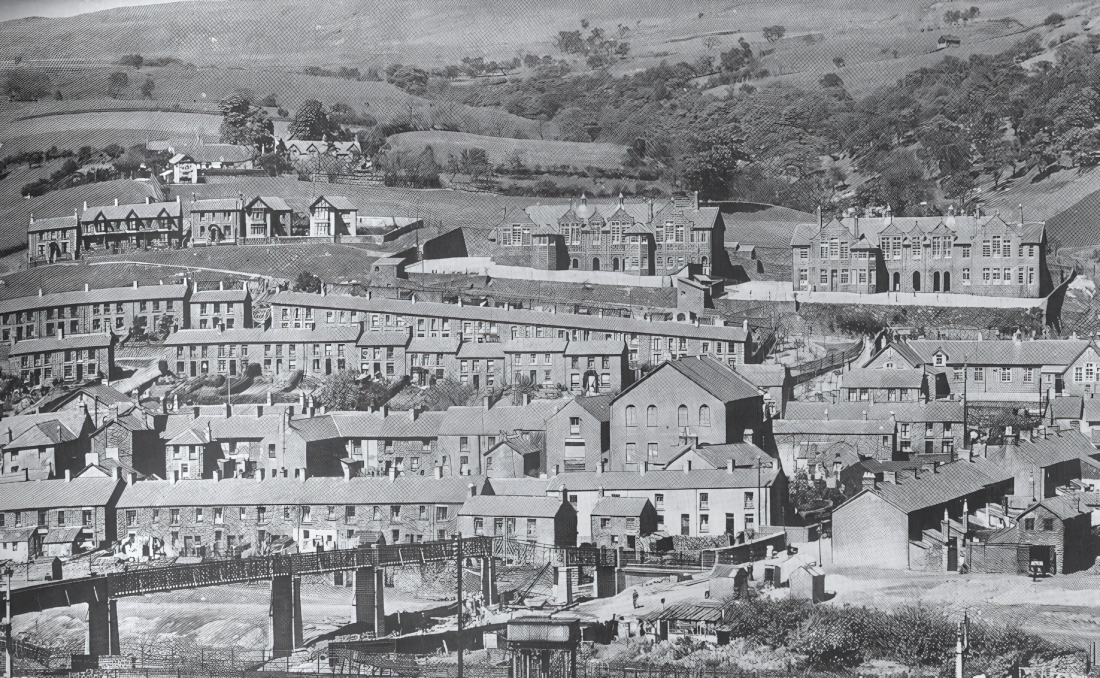
Photograph of Ystrad in 1943, showing the new railway footbridge

When Bodringallt Colliery school opened in 1861, only three other schools existed in the entire Rhondda valleys. The village also became home to several collieries belonging to the Cory brothers.

The Ystradyfodwg Cottage Hospital at Tyntyla, Ystrad, opened in 1887 as the Rhondda's first hospital. Its initial capacity was modest, with a four-bed ward designated solely for treating infectious diseases. By 1900, the growing village had gained a number of civic amenities: the Church of St Stephen was built in 1895–1896 at a cost of £3,600, and the Free Library was erected in 1895 for £3,000.

During the typhoid fever epidemic that affected the Rhondda Urban District in 1904, the outbreak was traced to contaminated water supplies, with the Tyntyla water source identified as the primary cause. The epidemic affected 399 people across the district, with 373 cases occurring in areas served by the contaminated Tyntyla supply.

During the Second World War, the Ystrad Free Library was completely destroyed on the night of Tuesday, 29 April 1941, during the same German air raid that devastated nearby Cwmparc. A single stray bomb struck the building, killing the librarian's wife who had returned to collect a coat while her family was on the mountainside watching the air raid. The bombing occurred during the same raid that caused the heaviest loss of life the Rhondda suffered in a single night, with 28 fatalities in Cwmparc. Many local residents had taken shelter at Nebo Chapel, which served as a temporary air raid shelter, while others watched the bombing from the mountainsides above the village.

=== Post-industrial period ===
The decline of the coal industry, which had defined Ystrad for over a century, began in the latter half of the 20th century. Bodringallt Colliery closed in 1959, and its site was subsequently cleared and landscaped.

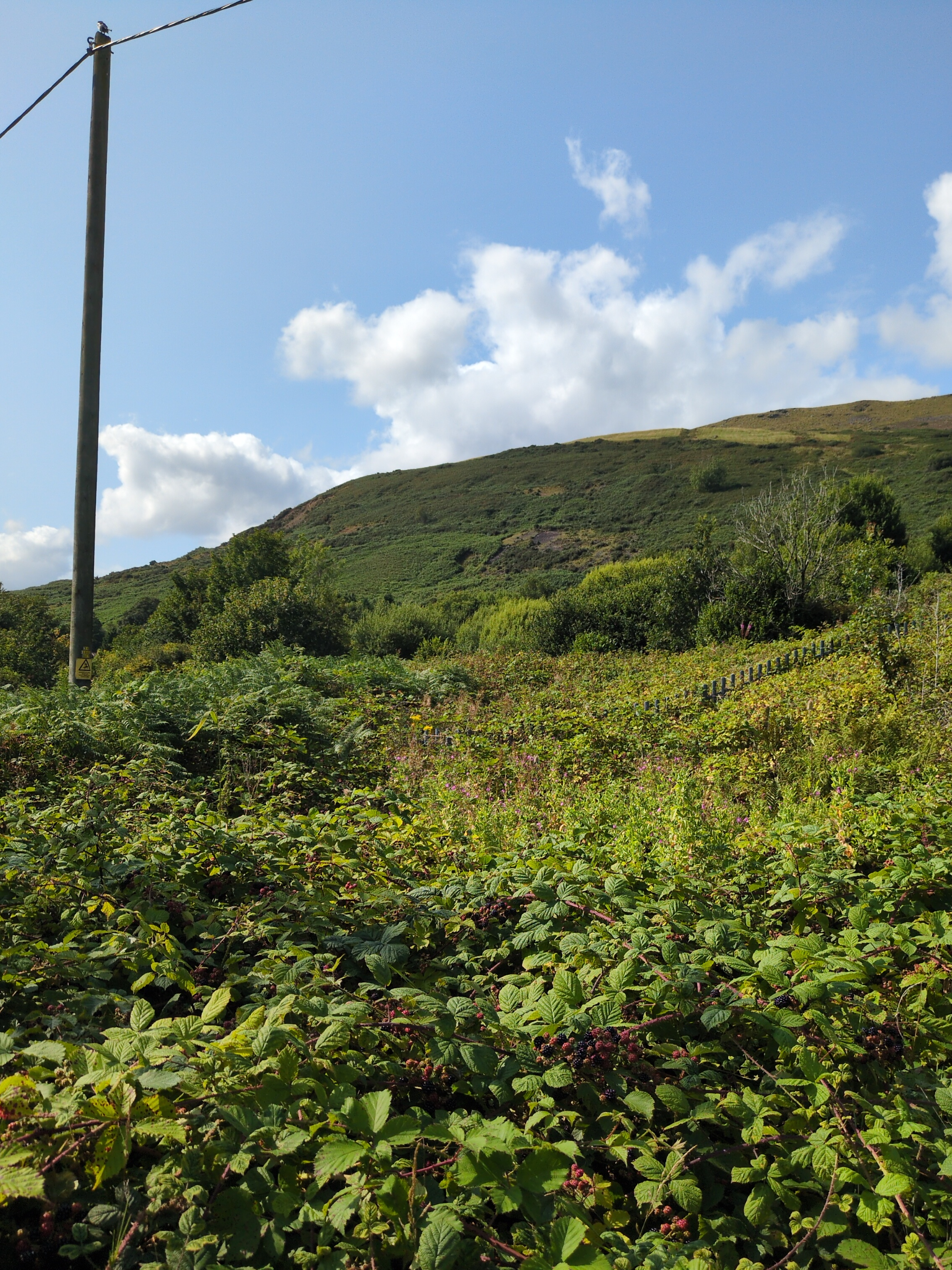
Site of the former Bodringallt Colliery, sunk in 1864 the colliery closed in 1959 and the site has been cleared and landscaped

Former colliery sites have been cleared, landscaped and repurposed. The Bodringallt Colliery site was cleared and the land has since been used for recreational purposes. The nearby Gelligaled Park, which occupies former industrial land, is the location of the Rhondda Sports Centre and provides open space for the community.

== Geography and layout ==
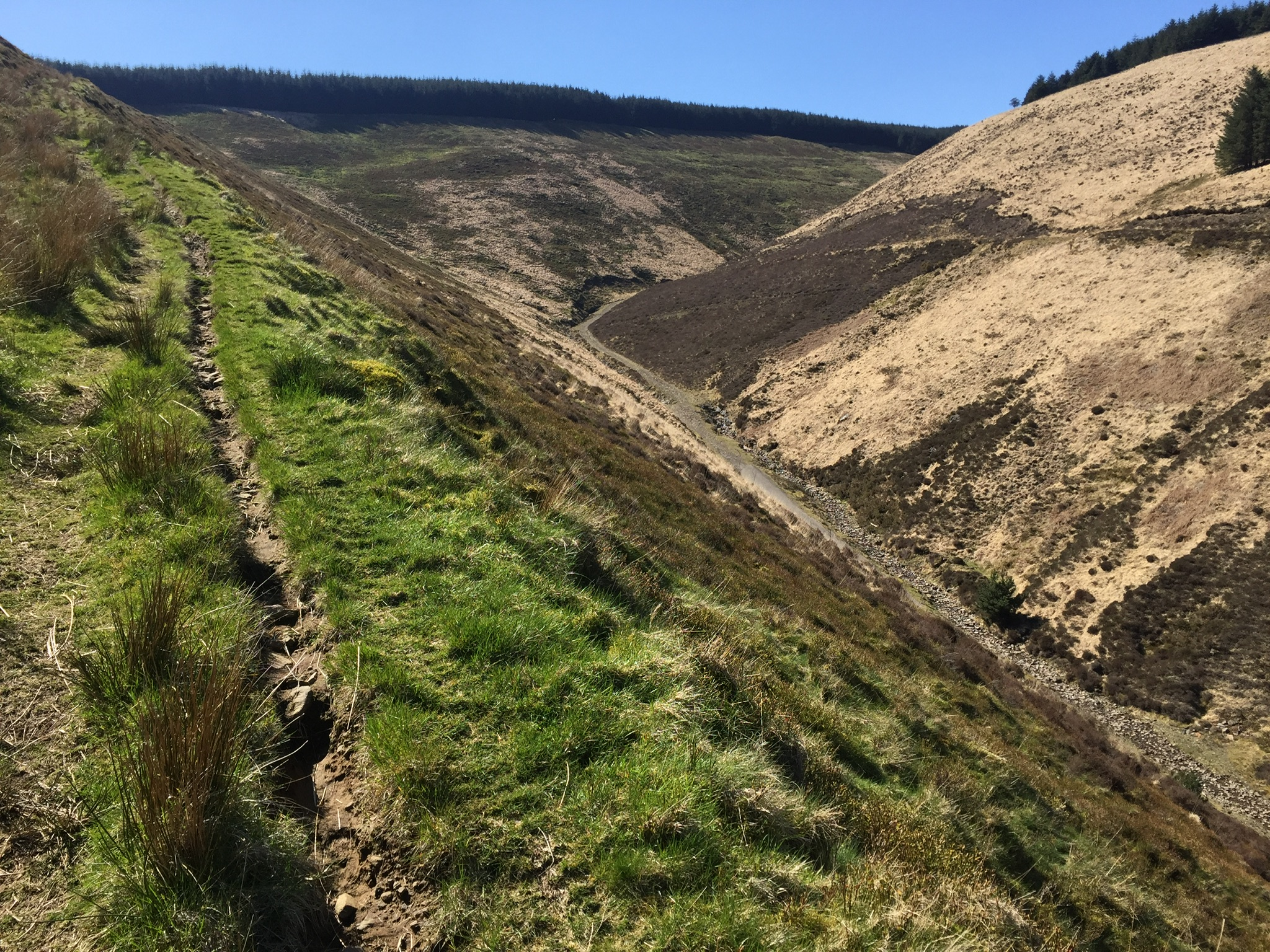
Looking across the glacial valley of Cwm Cesig, just outside Ystrad, where narrow footpaths trace the contours of the steep-sided slopes.

As a community and ward, Ystrad contains the neighbouring district of Gelli. The village lies in the Rhondda Fawr valley, which was formed by glacial action during the last ice age when slow-moving glaciers gouged out the deep, U-shaped valley that exists today. Like other valleys in the area, the Rhondda displays the characteristic U-shaped cross-section typical of glaciated valleys, with steep sides and a relatively flat floor.

The village is long and narrow, built along a main road where most amenities can be found, with a series of smaller residential streets branching off into the steep valley sides. This linear development pattern is characteristic of South Wales valley settlements, where the challenging topography constrains urban growth to follow the valley floor. The majority of the housing stock consists of the classic South Wales valleys terraces with infills of newer builds.

The Rhondda Fawr River runs through the village, separating it from Gelli on the southern bank. The river has its source at Ffynnon y Gwalciau at an elevation of about 544 metres above sea level and flows down through the valley, passing through Ystrad as part of its journey towards its confluence with the River Taff.

== Demography ==
Year	Population of Ystrad	Change
1991	6,223	—
2001	5,571	−652 (−10.5%)
2011	5,854	+283 (+5.1%)
2021	5,075	−779 (−13.3%)
Population change in Ystrad from 1991 to 2021.

The 2021 census showed that Ystrad ward had a total population of 5,075, of whom 2,522 were male and 2,553 were female. The largest age group was residents aged 50–64, who accounted for 20.1% of the population.

97.7% of residents stated their ethnicity as white, with 0.8% as Asian, 1.0% as mixed or multiple ethnic groups, 0.3% as Black, and 0.2% as other ethnic groups.

72.8% of residents declared Welsh only identity and 11.6% Welsh and British identity. Religiously, 63.0% stated no religion, whilst 29.9% declared Christianity. Only small percentages identified as other faiths: 0.2% Muslim, 0.2% Hindu, 0.3% Sikh, and 0.1% Buddhist.

The population was predominantly UK-born, with 98.2% born in the United Kingdom. 99.2% of households had all adults speaking English or Welsh as their main language. Educational attainment showed 28.7% had no qualifications, whilst 21.4% held Level 4 qualifications or above (degree level).

In terms of health, 40.8% reported very good health, though 13.8% were disabled under the Equality Act with day-to-day activities limited significantly. The ward had higher levels of economic inactivity (44.7%) compared to Wales overall (43.5%), with 23.4% retired and 9.2% long-term sick or disabled.

== Culture ==
The village has several community facilities.

=== Sport ===
In 1902, Ystrad Stars won the Glamorgan Times League. The following year they won the South Wales Challenge Cup. A second football side, Ystrad United, was active during the 1906–07 season.

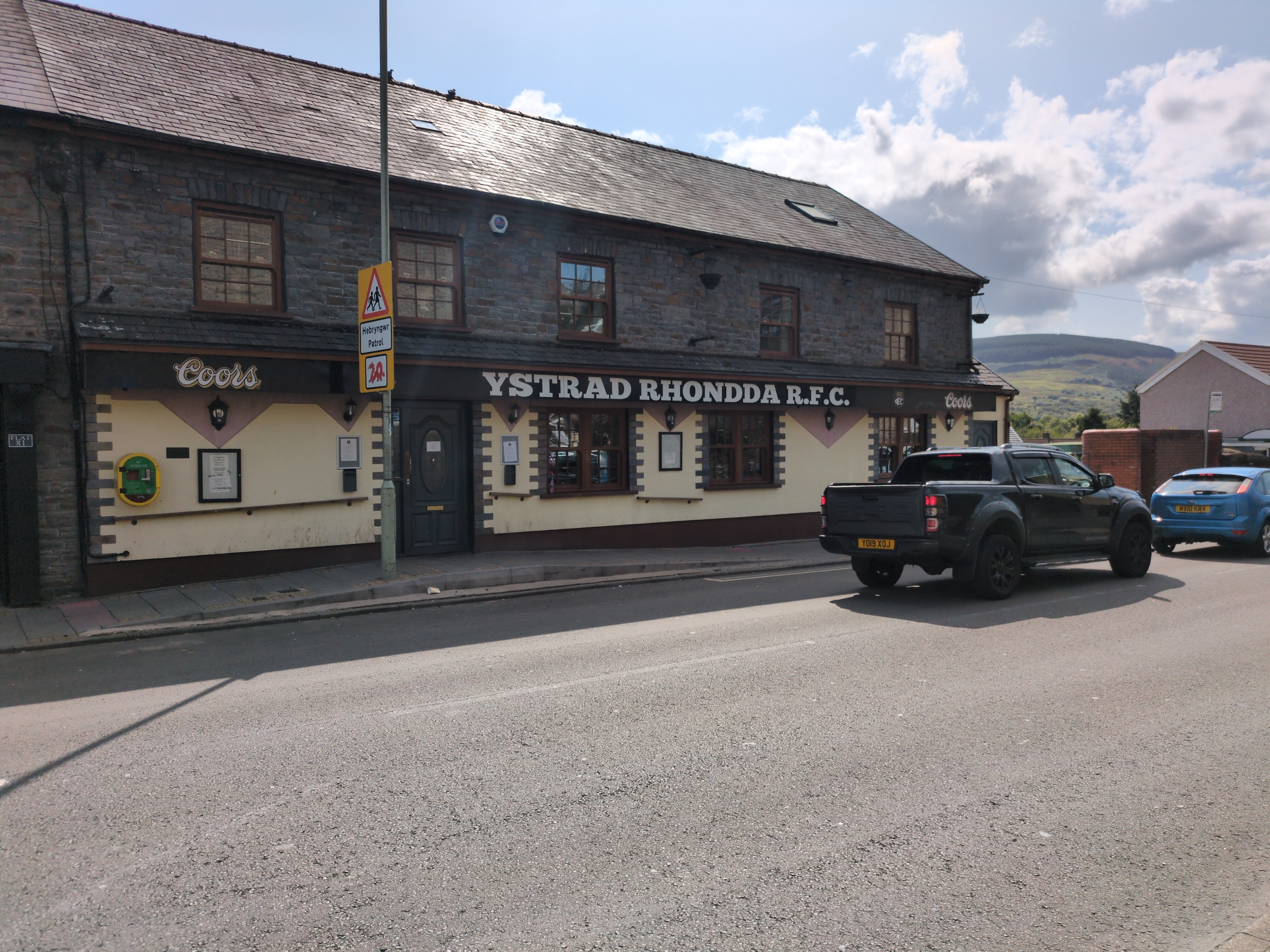
Ystrad Rhondda Rugby Club

Ystrad Rhondda RFC plays in the Welsh Rugby Union WRU Admiral Premiership. The club serves as a feeder team for Cardiff Blues and runs youth and mini-rugby programmes. Its facilities include a rugby pitch, clubhouse, and the Ystrad Rhondda Bar.

The Rhondda Sports Centre, located at Gelligaled Park, features swimming pools and gymnasium facilities, and hosts events including birthday parties, weddings, and conferences.

=== Landmarks ===
The Star Hotel Gellidawel stands at the junction of Penrhys Road and the main Rhondda road. The present building, constructed in the Edwardian Baroque style with a decorative terracotta star and date, was erected in 1913 around an earlier inn on the same site, with no break in service. The original inn was described by C. F. Cliffe in 1847 as "an ancient place" and "the only hotel in the valley". The site formerly included a handball court, quoits pitch, cockpit and stables. The inn gave its name to the surrounding area of Gellidawel ("quiet grove"), which served as a meeting place for local farmers before industrialisation. The hotel is a listed building.

=== Friendly societies ===
Ystrad was home to the Lily of the Valley Lodge of the Order of Oddfellows, which met at the Star Hotel Gellidawel. Founded in 1833, the lodge was one of the oldest and most successful in the area, with the motto "Philanthropic intentions are worthy of encouragement. Unity is Strength". Its original members were drawn from the local farmers, tradesmen and craftsmen of the pre-industrial era; after the arrival of the mines its membership expanded to include colliery workers. The lodge's strict rules from 1886 survive, recording fines for introducing politics into meetings, requirements for members claiming sick relief to be home by 8 pm in winter, and bans on admitting anyone "afflicted with rupture or loss of sight or limb". The lodge continued at Ystrad until 1976, and a street in the village was originally named Oddfellows Row, later renamed Club Row.

=== Religion ===
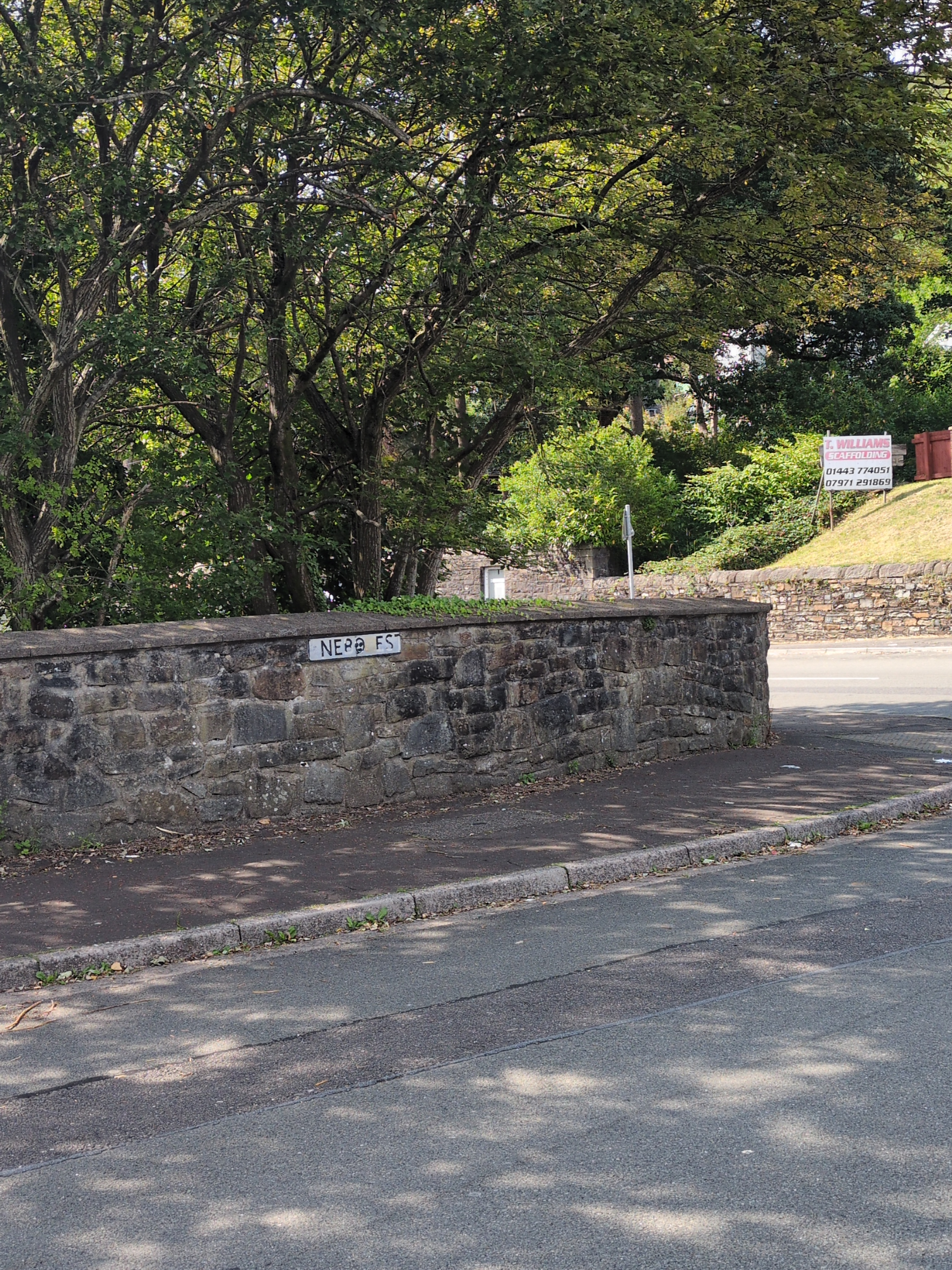
Surviving boundary wall of the historic Nebo Chapel, Ystrad Rhondda. The first Baptist chapel in the Rhondda Valley

Ystrad was the site of the first Baptist chapel in the Rhondda Valleys. Nebo, originally known as Ynysfach Chapel, was founded in 1786 at Heolfach on the banks of the River Rhondda. Its first minister was Thomas Edwards, and the name was changed to Nebo in the early part of the nineteenth century.

Nebo served as the 'mother' church to numerous other Baptist chapels throughout the Rhondda Valley, including Hebron, Ton Pentre (established in 1868 when 52 members were released from Nebo) and Noddfa, Treorchy.

As the valley industrialised, Nebo was rebuilt and extended in 1857 and again in 1876 to accommodate the growing congregation. The chapel's membership peaked at 318 in 1905, following the Welsh Revival. However, it was demolished in the early 1980s, though a neighbouring council estate was named in its memory and some remnants including a wall and railings survive.

The village was also served by other nonconformist chapels. Tabernacle English Baptist Chapel was built on Cross Street in 1876, with modifications in 1908, serving the English-speaking Baptist community. This chapel remained active until 1986. Various Methodist chapels also served the community, including Bethel Calvinistic Methodist Chapel on Heol-fach (built 1858, extended 1870) and Tabernacle English Primitive Methodist Chapel, reflecting the diversity of nonconformist worship in the area.

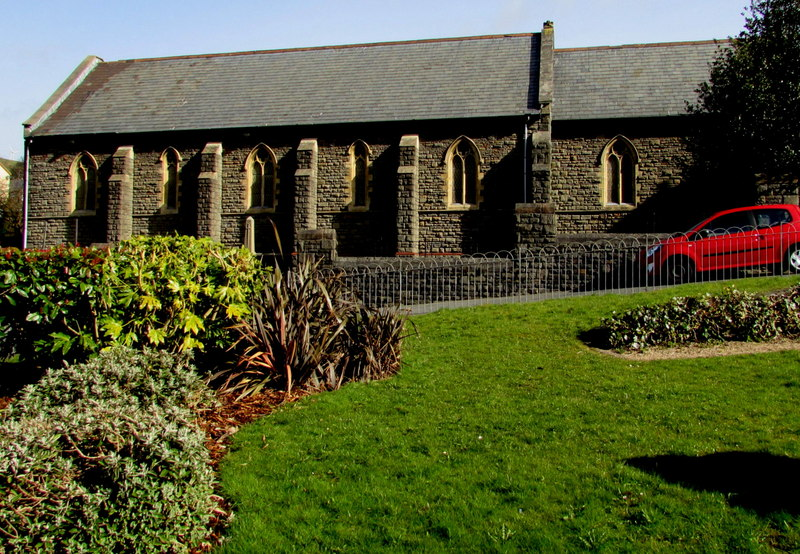
The Church of St Stephen, Ystrad Rhondda (Church in Wales)

For Anglican worship, the Church of St Stephen represents the Church in Wales tradition in Ystrad. Built in 1895–1896, it forms part of the Parish of Trealaw with Ystrad Rhondda with Ynyscynon in the Diocese of Llandaff. The church serves the Anglican community in the area.

The construction of Ynysfach/Nebo marked the beginning of organised Baptist worship in the Rhondda.

== Education ==
Before the establishment of state education, chapels and mining companies provided schooling for local children.

=== Early chapel-based education ===
The Ynysfach Baptist Meeting House, later renamed Nebo, was built in 1786 at Heolfach. Its Sunday School taught local children to read and write. As the first Baptist chapel in the Rhondda Valley, it provided a model of chapel-based education that spread through the region.

Nebo served as the mother church to several other chapels in the valley, including Hebron in Ton Pentre, established in 1868 when 52 members were released from Nebo.

Other nonconformist chapels in Ystrad also provided educational facilities. Tabernacle English Baptist Chapel was built on Cross Street in 1876, with modifications in 1908, serving the English-speaking Baptist community. Various Methodist chapels served the community, including Bethel Calvinistic Methodist Chapel on Heol-fach (built 1858, extended 1870), reflecting the diversity of denominational education provision before state schools were established.

The Elementary Education Act 1870 established school boards to build schools where voluntary provision was insufficient, directly addressing the educational needs of the Rhondda's rapidly expanding mining population.

The mining industry's growth created an urgent need for schools to serve the children of miners' families who had moved to the area. Previously, many working-class children in mining communities found their only chance to learn was at Chapel Sunday Schools, where lessons concentrated on reading, writing, arithmetic and scripture.

=== Modern primary education ===
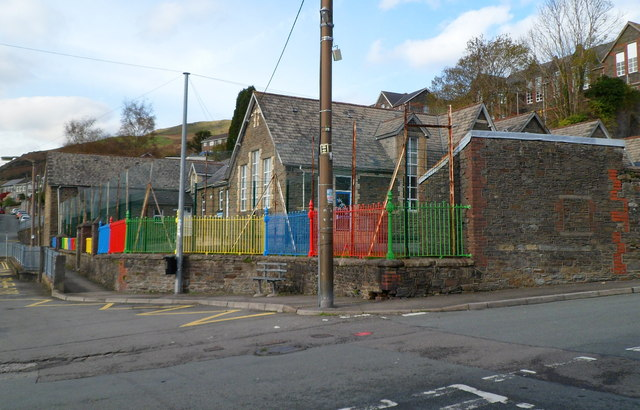
Ysgol Gymraeg Bodringallt, the Welsh-medium primary school serving Ystrad, located on Bodringallt Terrace

Ystrad is served by two primary schools, both named after Bodringallt Colliery. Ysgol Gymraeg Bodringallt provides Welsh-medium education with 134 pupils on roll, including 33 in nursery classes. 31.5% of statutory school age pupils at the school speak Welsh at home.

Bodringallt Primary School provides English-medium education in the same locality. The schools are located on nearby streets, Ysgol Gymraeg Bodringallt on Bryn Terrace and Bodringallt Primary School on Bodringallt Terrace.

=== Secondary education ===
Secondary school pupils from Ystrad typically attend schools in the wider Rhondda area, as part of Rhondda Cynon Taf's comprehensive secondary education provision.

== Transport ==
=== Bus ===
Local bus services connect Ystrad with other communities in the Rhondda Valley and provide links to Cardiff and surrounding areas. Services are operated by Stagecoach South Wales, including the 132 service between Maerdy in the Rhondda valley and Cardiff, which passes through Ystrad as part of the regional bus network serving the South Wales valleys.

=== Rail ===
Ystrad Rhondda railway station serves the village and is located on the Rhondda Line. The current station was opened by British Rail on 29 September 1986, replacing an earlier station originally opened in 1861 on the Taff Vale Railway. The original station, initially called "Ystrad", was renamed "Ystrad Rhondda" in 1930, and then renamed Ton Pentre in 1986 when the new Ystrad Rhondda station opened approximately one mile further down the line. Alphabetically, Ystrad Rhondda is the last station name in the United Kingdom, with Abbey Wood in southeast London being the first.

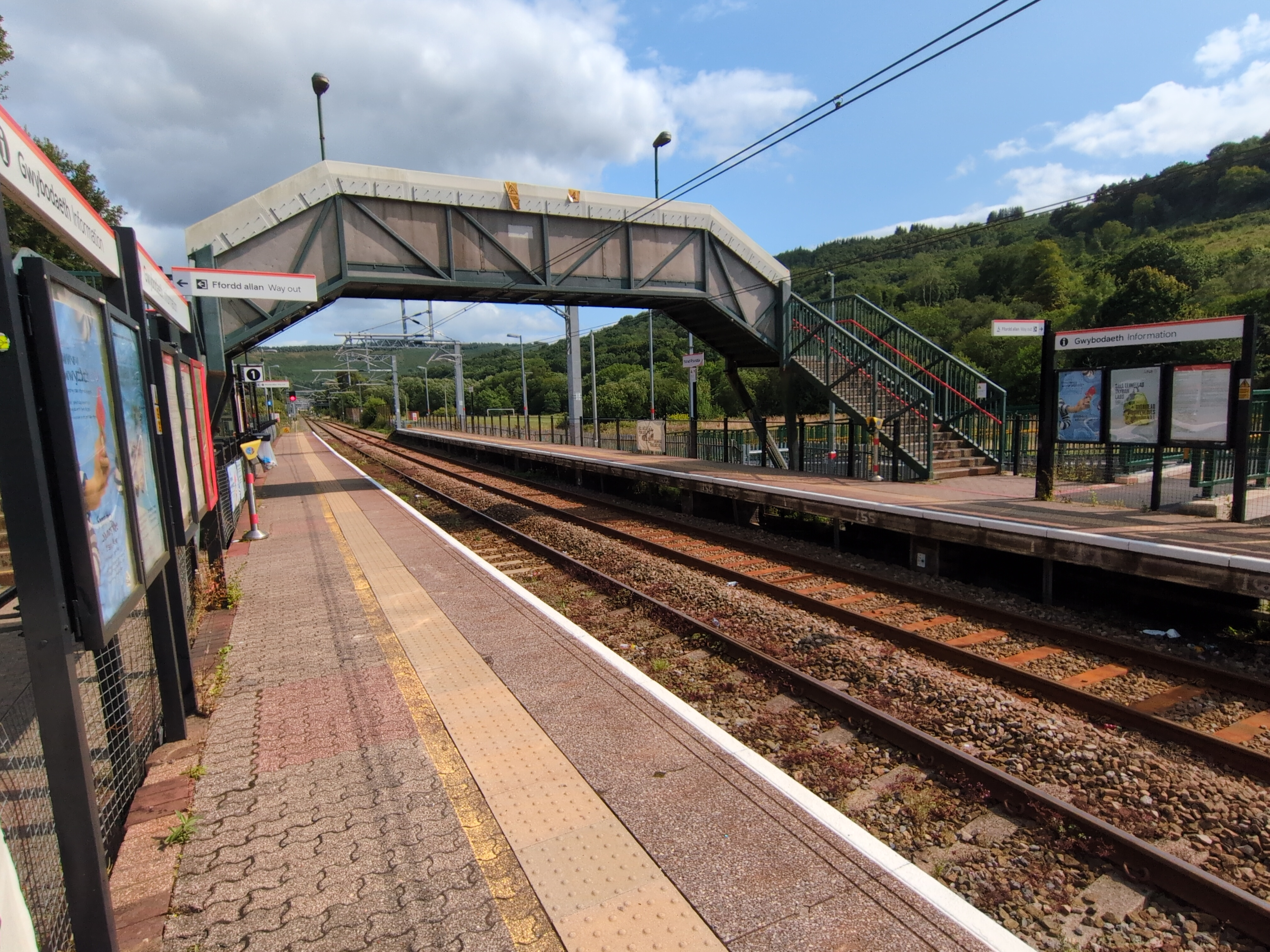
Ystrad Rhondda railway station following its modernisation as part of the South Wales Metro project, featuring new platforms and footbridge.

The station is the location of the only passing loop on the section of route north of Porth, which enables a half-hourly service to operate.

The line had been progressively singled by British Rail between 1972 and 1981, making this passing loop essential for train operations. Until recently, the station retained historic token exchange signalling equipment, some dating back to the 1930s, which was described as among the oldest railway signalling equipment in use in Britain.

As part of the South Wales Metro modernisation programme, Ystrad Rhondda station was closed for several months during 2023-2024 while extensive upgrade works were carried out. The modernisation work included the installation of new platforms, a new footbridge, electrification infrastructure, and the replacement of the historic token signalling system with modern colour light signalling. The line reopened on 26 February 2024 as part of the electrified South Wales Metro network.

Transport for Wales operates services from the station, with a half-hourly service Monday to Saturday to Cardiff Central via Pontypridd southbound, and to Treherbert northbound. Sunday services operate every hour, with some southbound trains continuing through to Barry Island.

In the 2023–24 reporting period, the station recorded 18,826 entries and exits, a decrease from 41,016 the previous year, reflecting the extended closure for the Metro upgrade works. Usage had previously peaked at 91,313 in 2002–03.

=== Road ===
The A4058 road (William Street) runs through the centre of Ystrad, forming part of the main arterial route through the Rhondda Fawr valley.

The A4058 has undergone significant improvements since the closure of local coal mines, with sections of the route utilising reclaimed railway land after the pits shut down. There is a roundabout junction with the A4119 from Llantrisant approximately a mile south of Ystrad, providing links to Cardiff and the M4 motorway network. The B4278 crosses the A4058 on the south bank of the Rhondda Fawr near Dinas Rhondda railway station, running along the north bank of the river through the valley.

The A4058 through Ystrad crosses the Rhondda Fawr via Bodringallt Bridge, which underwent major repair works in 2024. The bridge carries William Street and required a 12-week programme of structural improvements including infilling voids under the bridge deck, repainting metal parapets, and rebuilding approach walls.

== Governance ==
The Ystrad electoral ward is coterminous with the borders of the Ystrad community and elects two county councillors to Rhondda Cynon Taf County Borough Council. From 1995 to 2004 it was represented by Plaid Cymru. Between 2004 and 2017 it was represented by the Labour Party though at the May 2017 election Plaid Cymru re-took the ward, with Elyn Stephens elected as councillor. At the 2022 election Labour regained both seats, with two new councillors elected. Elyn Stephens, a former councillor for the ward, was subsequently elected as the Member of the Senedd for Afan Ogwr Rhondda in the 2026 Senedd election.

== Notable people ==
See Category:People from Ystrad

Several notable people are associated with Ystrad. Jonathan Rees (1841–1905), who wrote under the pen name Nathan Wyn, was a poet and colliery official who moved to Ystrad in 1877 and worked at Bodringallt Colliery. He won six prizes at the 1900 National Eisteddfod and published two collections of poetry. Sir Ben Bowen Thomas was born in Ystrad and became a civil servant and educationalist. He served as Permanent Secretary to the Welsh Department of the Ministry of Education and chairman of UNESCO's executive board. He was knighted in 1950.

Annie Powell was born in Ystrad and became Britain's first female Communist mayor when elected Mayor of Rhondda in 1979. A teacher for 40 years, she joined the Communist Party in 1938 and served as a councillor for over twenty years.

Local sportsmen include rugby players Mike Griffiths, Maurice Richards and Rex Willis, all Wales internationals and British Lions. Football is represented by Wales international Mel Hopkins and manager Nathan Jones. John Dennis Boocker (1922–1987), known as "Dinny", was a professional rugby league footballer who played for Wales.

Other residents include Jill Evans, a former Plaid Cymru MEP, and artist Ernest Zobole, a founding member of the Rhondda Group and 56 Group Wales.

== Bibliography ==
- Carradice, Phil (2003). Wales At War. Gomer Press.
- Davis, Paul R. (1989). Historic Rhondda. Ynyshir: Hackman. ISBN 0-9508556-3-4.
- Hutton, John (2006). The Taff Vale Railway. Vol. 2. Silver Link. ISBN 978-1-85794-250-7.
- Lewis, E. D. (1959). The Rhondda Valleys. London: Phoenix House.
- Lewis, Samuel (1833). A Topographical Dictionary of Wales. London: S. Lewis and Co.
- May, John (2003). Rhondda, 1203-2003: The Story of the Two Valleys. Castle Publications. ISBN 1871354099.
- Medical Officer of Health (1905). Special Report Upon An Epidemic of Typhoid Fever Which Occurred in the Rhondda Urban District 1904-5. Treherbert: Rhondda Urban District Council.
- Williams, Glanmor, ed. (1974). Glamorgan County History, Volume IV, Early Modern Glamorgan from the Act of Union to the Industrial Revolution. University of Wales Press.
