= Thomas Hughes (bishop) =

Welsh archdeacon (1895–1981)

Thomas Maurice Hughes (17 April 1895 – 4 October 1981) was an eminent Welsh Anglican priest in the second half of the twentieth century: he was Archdeacon of Margam from 1960 to 1964; and Archdeacon of Llandaff 1964 to 1969; and an Assistant Bishop of Llandaff from 1961 until 1970.

He was educated at St David's College, Lampeter and Keble College, Oxford; and ordained after wartime service in 1922. After a curacy in Port Talbot he was a Minor canon at Llandaff Cathedral 1928 - 1931. He was Vicar of Cadoxton, Neath 1931 - 1937, then St Catherine, Cardiff 1937 - 1942, then Rector of Merthyr Tydfil 1942 - 1946. He was Vicar of St John the Baptist, Cardiff from 1946 to 1960; Canon and Precentor of Llandaff Cathedral during the same period; and Rural Dean of Cardiff from 1954 until his appointment as Rector of Llandow with Llysworney and Archdeacon of Margam.

Church in Wales titles
Preceded by Lawrence Thomas	Archdeacon of Margam; 1961–1965	Succeeded by Eric Roberts
Preceded by Gwynno James	Archdeacon of Llandaff; 1965–1969	Succeeded by John Williams
