= David Reece (bishop) =

Welsh archdeacon (1913–1999)

David Reece (1913–1999) was the Archdeacon of Margam from 1971 to 1981.

Reece was educated at Gonville and Caius College, Cambridge and St. Michael's College, Llandaff; and ordained in 1937. After curacies in Aberystwyth and Llanelly he held incumbencies in Pembroke and Port Talbot.

From 1977 to 1983 he was also Assistant Bishop of Llandaff.

Church in Wales titles
Preceded by Eric Matthias Roberts	Archdeacon of Margam; 1971–1981	Succeeded by Albert John Francis Lewis
