= Jonathan Rees (poet) =

Welsh poet, educationalist, and colliery official

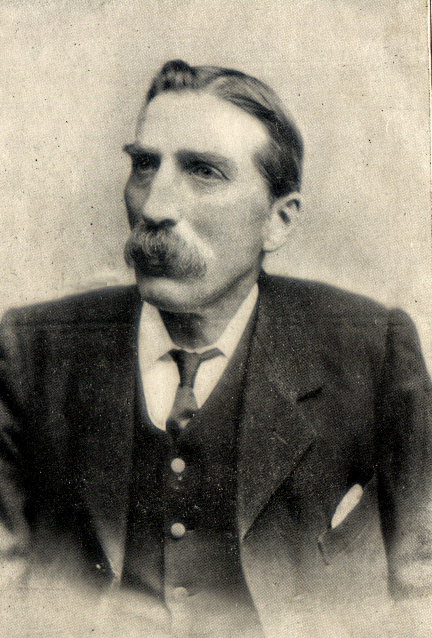
- Jonathan Rees in 1905

Personal details
- Born: 21 August 1841 Puncheston, Pembrokeshire, Wales
- Died: 13 June 1905 (aged 63) Ystrad, Rhondda, Wales
- Occupation: Colliery official, educationalist
- Writing career
- Pen name: Nathan Wyn
- Language: Welsh
- Subjects: Poetry
- Notable works: Caniadau Nathan Wyn, Munudau Hamddenol

Jonathan Rees (21 August 1841 – 13 June 1905) was a Welsh poet, educationalist, and colliery official who wrote under the pen name Nathan Wyn. He was a prominent figure in Welsh literary circles and a successful competitor at the National Eisteddfod during the late 19th and early 20th centuries.

== Early life and career ==
Rees was born on 21 August 1841 in Puncheston, Pembrokeshire, the son of James and Eunice Rees. He was the brother of Evan Rees (Dyfed). When he was nine years old, his family moved to Aberdare, and later relocated to Ystrad in 1877.

Rees worked as a colliery official at Bodringallt for the remainder of his working life. He was also active in education, serving on the Rhondda School Board for many years.

== Literary career ==
Rees achieved recognition as a poet from a young age and became a highly successful competitor at the National Eisteddfod, winning prizes across various poetic metres during the final thirty years of his life. His most notable achievement came at the Liverpool National Eisteddfod in 1900, where he was awarded six prizes in different competitions.

Rees published two collections of poetry Caniadau Nathan Wyn and Munudau Hamddenol. Many of his poems and essays were published in Welsh periodicals including Y Gwladgarwr, Y Geninen, and Cymru (O.M.E.).

== Death ==
Jonathan Rees died on 13 June 1905. His death was noted in the Welsh press, with Tarian Y Gweithiwr publishing an obituary tribute on 29 June 1905 that praised his poetic work and character. The tribute, written under the pen name "Y Dr YW" from Tylorstown, commemorated him as a "dedicated poet whose bardic work would be long remembered."
