= Tyntyla Isolation Hospital =

Former isolation hospital in Ystrad, Wales

- Pontypridd and Rhondda Hospital Management Committee
- Shown in Rhondda Cynon Taf

Geography
- Location: Ystrad, Rhondda Cynon Taf, Wales
- Coordinates: 51.643°N 3.456°W

Organisation
- Care system: NHS Wales
- Type: Isolation hospital

Services
- Beds: 4 (1887), 32 (1904), 118 (1958)

History
- Founded: 1887
- Closed: November 1991

Links
- Lists: Hospitals in Wales

Tyntyla Isolation Hospital was an isolation hospital in Ystrad, Rhondda Cynon Taf, Wales. It was established in 1887 as the Ystradyfodwg Cottage Hospital, the first hospital in the Rhondda, and expanded in stages between 1897 and 1938. During the 1904 typhoid fever outbreak in the Rhondda the hospital held more than 50 patients at a time, above its design capacity of 36 beds, and by 1958 it had 118 beds for the isolation and treatment of infectious diseases, tuberculosis and chest conditions. The hospital joined the National Health Service in 1948 and closed in November 1991. The site is occupied by Priory Hospital Tŷ Cwm Rhondda, a private mental health hospital.

== History ==
Established in 1887 as the Ystradyfodwg Cottage Hospital, it was the first hospital in the Rhondda, initially comprising a small four-bed ward for the treatment of infectious diseases. The hospital was gradually expanded between 1897 and 1938 and became part of the National Health Service in 1948 under the administration of the Pontypridd and Rhondda Hospital Management Committee.

=== Rhondda typhoid fever outbreak of 1904 ===
The hospital treated patients during a typhoid fever epidemic in the Rhondda Urban District in 1904. It stood about 230 yards (210 m) from the suspected source of the outbreak in the Tyntyla water supply. By 11 November 1904 it contained 61 patients, 38 of whom had typhoid fever.

Although designed for 36 beds, the hospital housed more than 50 patients at a time during the epidemic. Additional beds, bedding and equipment were ordered, and both the newer 32-bed block and the original four-bed building were used. The nursing staff was supplemented by extra nurses, some working at the hospital while others acted as district nurses under the superintendence of the Medical Officer of Health.

In total 399 cases of typhoid fever were notified across the district, 373 (93.4%) of them in the area served by the contaminated Tyntyla water supply.

=== Later history ===
By 1958 the hospital had 118 beds for the isolation and treatment of infectious diseases, tuberculosis and chest conditions.

During the 1962 smallpox outbreak in Wales, volunteers from the hospital provided nursing staff for the designated smallpox hospital on Penrhys mountain.

=== Closure and later use ===
The hospital closed in November 1991.

The site is occupied by Priory Hospital Tŷ Cwm Rhondda, a private low secure mental health hospital for men with complex mental health needs, operated by the Priory Group.
