= Rhondda Sports Centre =

Sports centre in Ystrad, Rhondda, Wales

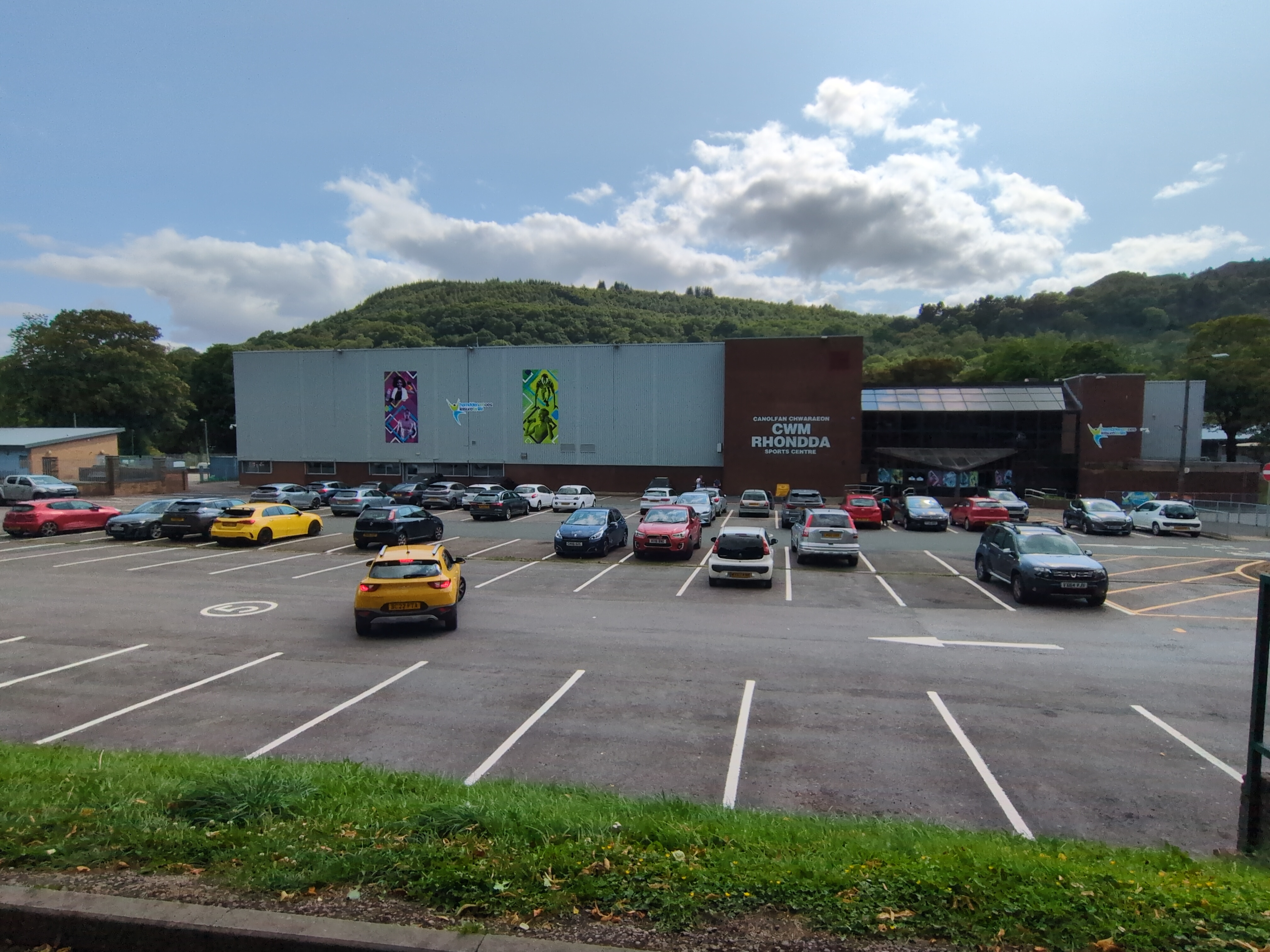
- Interactive map of the Rhondda Sports Centre area

General information
- Type: Sports centre
- Location: Gelligaled Park, Tyntyla Road, Ystrad, Rhondda, Wales
- Coordinates: 51°38′33″N 3°27′40″W
- Completed: 1975
- Opened: 1975
- Renovated: 2008
- Cost: £1 million (1975)
- Renovation cost: £6 million (2008)
- Owner: Rhondda Cynon Taf County Borough Council

Rhondda Sports Centre is a leisure centre located in Gelligaled Park, Ystrad, in the Rhondda valley, Wales. The centre underwent a major £6 million refurbishment in 2008 and is operated by Rhondda Cynon Taf County Borough Council.

== History ==
=== Gelligaled Park and the original lido ===
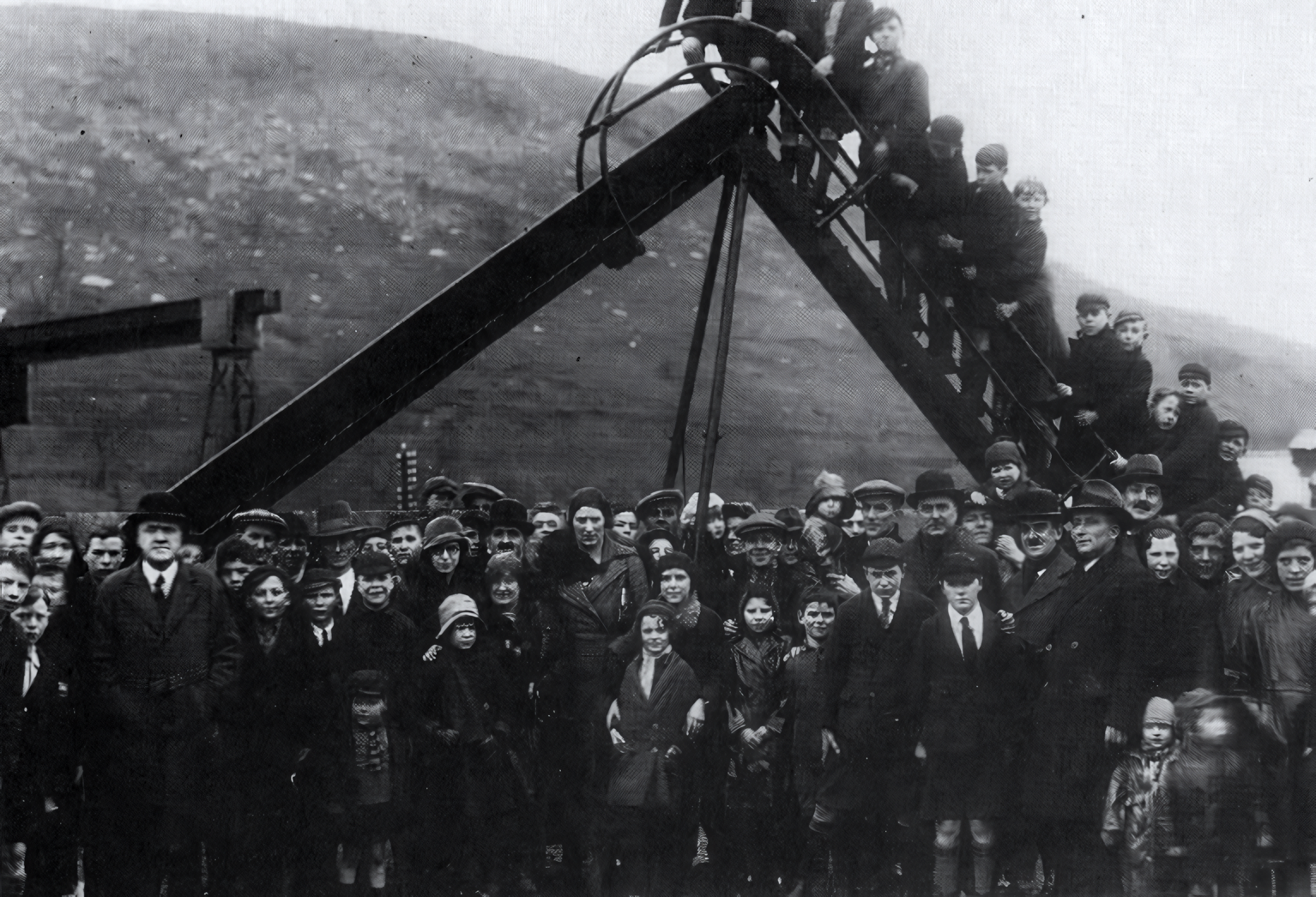
Ystrad residents celebrating the opening of Gelligaled Park in the mid 1930s

The sports centre is situated within Gelligaled Park, which was first developed in the 1920s as a large public recreation area. The Rhondda Urban District Council allocated £20,000 in 1925 for the park's construction, with plans including multiple tennis courts, playing fields, pitches for hockey and quoits, a children's playground, and open-air swimming baths.

The park's open-air swimming facility, which opened in the mid-1930s with funding from the Miners' Welfare Fund, was the first public lido in the Rhondda valley. The park gained historical significance when the Duke of Edinburgh visited on 2 May 1955 to present the Charter of Incorporation forming Rhondda Borough Council to Councillor Ivor Jones, the then Chairman of Rhondda Urban District Council. This ceremony marked Rhondda attaining borough status.

=== Development of the sports centre ===
The modern sports centre was constructed in 1975 at a cost of £1 million, replacing the original open-air swimming baths. The historic lido was demolished to make way for the new indoor facility, which featured an indoor swimming pool.

=== 2008 refurbishment ===
In 2008, the centre underwent a comprehensive £6 million refurbishment programme. The project included the installation of a multi-station fitness suite, a new dance studio, and enhanced group exercise facilities. The existing swimming pool was redeveloped, and significant structural improvements were made to the building. Energy-efficiency measures were also implemented as part of the renovation.

== Role and facilities ==
The centre serves as a community leisure facility and also supports educational programmes. It is used by MPCT Sports & Exercise College for delivering practical elements of their sports and exercise programmes, with students accessing the gym, swimming pool, and multi-purpose areas for training and development.
