= Philip Morris (priest) =

Philip Gregory Morris (born 1950) was an Archdeacon of Margam.

Morris was educated at the University of Leeds and ordained after studying at the College of the Resurrection, Mirfield. After curacies in Aberdare and Neath he was a team vicar in Llantwit Major from 1988 until 2001 when he became a residential canon of Llandaff Cathedral.

Church in Wales titles
Preceded by Martin Inffeld Williams	Archdeacon of Margam; 2001–2015	Succeeded by Michael Komor
