= Lawrence Thomas (priest) =

Welsh archdeacon

Lawrence Thomas, DD (19 August 1889 - 19 October 1960) was a Welsh Anglican priest and the inaugural Archdeacon of Margam.

He was educated at Lewis School, Pengam; St David's College, Lampeter; St John's College, Oxford; Trinity College, Dublin (studies in Hebrew); and St. Michael's College, Llandaff. He was ordained in 1912. After curacies in Cardiff and Oxford he was the Vicar of Briton Ferry from 1924 to 1942; Vicar of Bargoed from 1942 to 1946; and Vicar of Aberavon from 1946 to 1958. He was Treasurer of Llandaff Cathedral from 1948 until his death.

Church in Wales titles
Preceded by Inaugural appointment	Archdeacon of Margam; 1948–1960	Succeeded by Thomas Maurice Hughes
