= Evan Rees (Dyfed) =

Welsh poet, Calvinistic Methodist minister, and archdruid

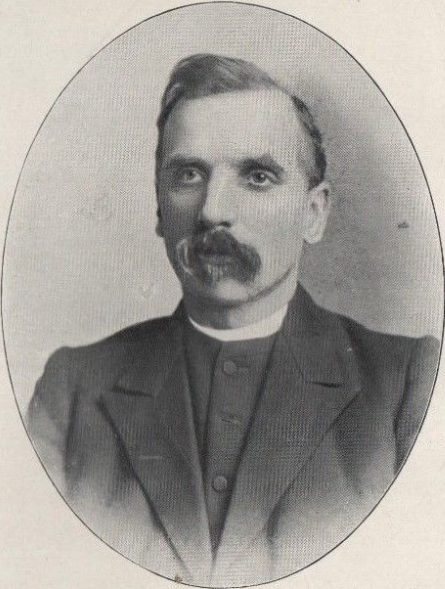
- Frontispiece of Gwaith Barddonol Dyfed vol. 2 (1907)

Archdruid of the National Eisteddfod of Wales
- In office 1905–1923

Personal details
- Born: 1 January 1850 Puncheston, Pembrokeshire, Wales
- Died: 19 March 1923 (aged 73)
- Occupation: Minister
- Writing career
- Pen name: Dyfed
- Language: Welsh

Evan Rees (1 January 1850 – 19 March 1923), known by the bardic name Dyfed, was a Calvinistic Methodist minister, poet, and Archdruid of the National Eisteddfod of Wales.

== Life ==
Rees was born at Puncheston, Pembrokeshire, the son of James and Eunice Rees. He was the brother of Jonathan Rees, who wrote under the pen name Nathan Wyn. The family moved to Aberdare when he was a child and he began working in the local colliery at the age of only eight. Having moved to Cardiff, he became a Calvinistic Methodist minister at the age of 23 and gained his first National Eisteddfod victory in 1881.

In 1893, Rees participated in the Eisteddfod that was held as part of the World Columbian Exposition in Chicago, Illinois, winning the Bardic Chair and a $500 prize for a 2,000 line awdl on the set subject Iesu o Nazareth ("Jesus of Nazareth").

Rees went on to become the Archdruid of the Gorsedd Cymru and to announce the posthumous victory of Hedd Wyn at the famous 1917 "Eisteddfod of the Black Chair" in Birkenhead.

== Works ==
- Caniadau Dyfedfab (c. 1875) OCLC 502503798
- Gwlad yr Addewid a Iesu o Nazareth (1900) OCLC 21776293
- Gwaith Barddonol Dyfed (1903–1907) OCLC 55577536
- Oriau gydag Islwyn (1901) OCLC 819401047
- Emynau Dyfed (1924, posthumous) OCLC 39741895

| Preceded by Rowland Williams | Archdruid of the National Eisteddfod of Wales; 1905–1923 | Succeeded by John Cadvan Davies |
