= Martin Williams (priest) =

Martin Inffeld Williams (b 1937) was the Archdeacon of Margam from 1992 to 2001; and then of Morgannwg until 2004.

Williams was educated at Sidney Sussex College, Cambridge and ordained in 1965. After a curacy in Greenford he was Tutor and Vice Principal at Chichester Theological College then Vicar of Roath, Saint German, Cardiff until his appointment as Archdeacon.

Church in Wales titles
Preceded by Douglas Gordon James	Archdeacon of Margam; 1992–2001	Succeeded by Philip Gregory Morris
Preceded by Inaugural appointment	Archdeacon of Morgannwg; 2002–2004	Succeeded by David Yeoman
