= Michael Komor =

Archdeacon of Margam

Michael Komor (born 1960) has been Archdeacon of Margam since 2018.

Mike Komor was educated at the University of Wales and Chichester Theological College. He was made deacon at Petertide 1986 (28 June) and ordained priest the following Petertide (27 June 1987) — both times by Roy Davies, Bishop of Llandaff, at Llandaff Cathedral. After curacies in Mountain Ash and Llantwit Major he held incumbencies at Ewenny and Coity. He is also a member of the Chapter of Llandaff Cathedral. He was collated to the archdeaconry on 27 September 2018.

He retired in January 2024.

Church in Wales titles
Preceded by Philip Morris	Archdeacon of Margam; 2018 – present	Incumbent
