= Gordon James (priest) =

Welsh archdeacon (1922–2000)

Douglas Gordon James (1922-2000) was the Archdeacon of Margam from 1988 to 1992.

James was educated at University College of Wales, Aberystwyth and became a solicitor. He studied for the priesthood at Queen's College, Edgbaston and was ordained in 1976. After a curacy he was the incumbent at Aberdare until his appointment as Archdeacon.

Church in Wales titles
Preceded by Albert John Francis Lewis	Archdeacon of Margam; 1988–1992	Succeeded by Martin Inffeld Williams
