= Nebo Chapel, Ystrad Rhondda =

Former chapel in Ystrad Rhondda, Rhondda Cynon Taf, Wales

Coordinates: 51.6463°N 3.4739°W

Nebo Chapel
- Nebo Baptist Chapel, Ystrad Rhondda
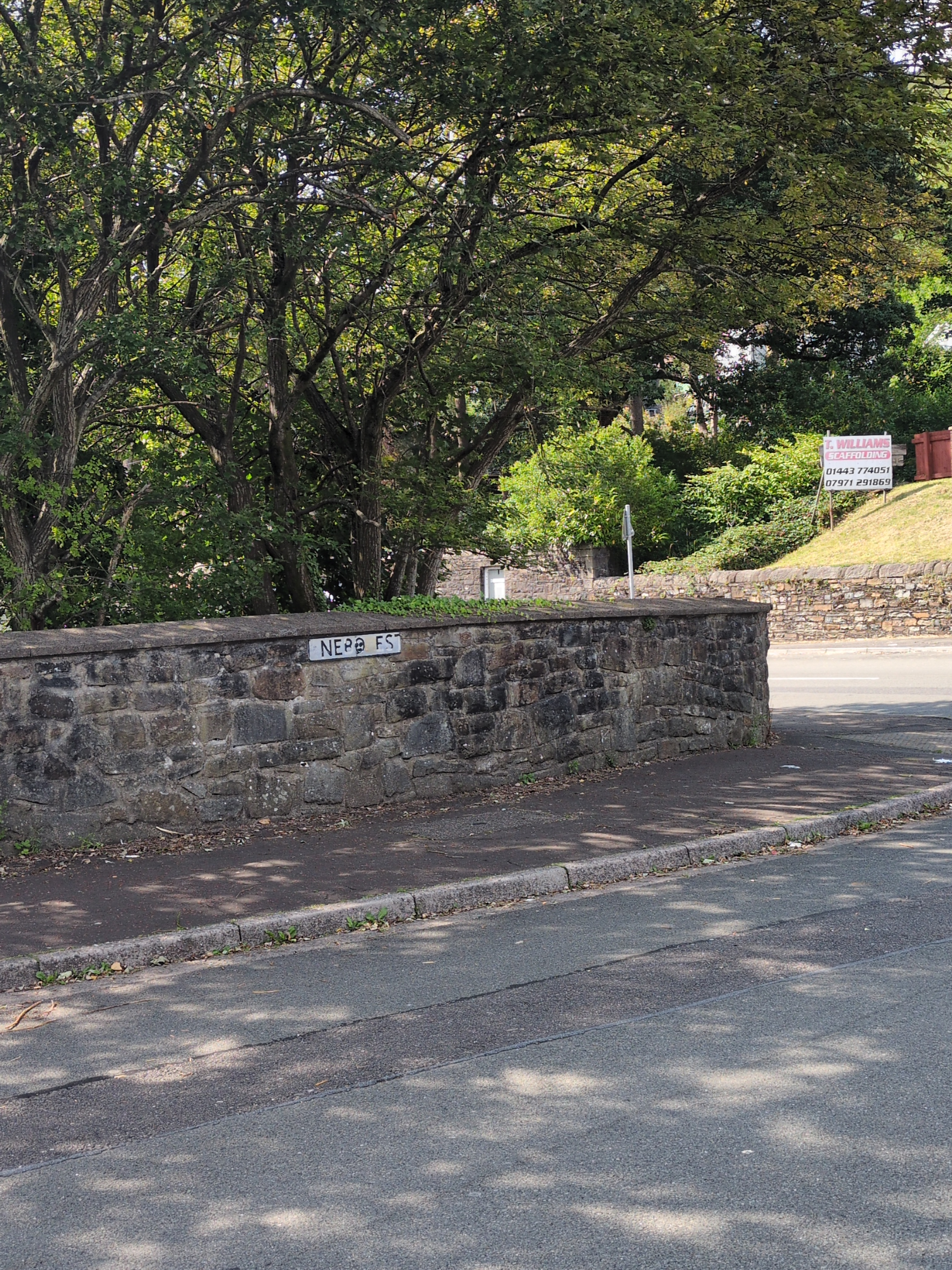
- Surviving boundary wall of the historic Nebo Chapel
- Nebo Chapel
- Location: Ystrad, Rhondda
- Country: Wales
- Denomination: Baptist

History
- Founded: 1786
- Founder: Thomas Edwards

Architecture
- Style: Italianate
- Completed: 1876 (last rebuild/extension)
- Closed: early 1980s
- Demolished: after early 1980s (exact date unknown)

Nebo, Ystrad Rhondda was the first Baptist chapel in the Rhondda Valleys. Founded in 1786 and originally known as Ynysfach, its first minister was Thomas Edwards. The chapel's name was changed to Nebo in the early nineteenth century.

Nebo served as the mother church to numerous other chapels in the valley, including Hebron, Ton Pentre in 1868, and Noddfa, Treorchy, which subsequently grew to surpass Nebo in membership.

With the industrialisation of the Rhondda Valley, Nebo was rebuilt and extended twice, first in 1857 and again in 1876. The chapel was constructed in the Italianate architectural style, featuring a gable-entry plan and tall, round-headed windows, characteristic of the period.

The chapel played a significant educational role within the community. Its Sunday School provided instruction in reading and writing at a time when formal education was limited, contributing to the improvement of literacy in the local population.

Nebo's membership peaked at 318 in 1905, in the immediate aftermath of the Welsh Revival. However, the following decades saw a steady decline in congregation numbers, falling to 132 by 1940 and further dropping to 62 by 1945. Garfield Eynon became Nebo's last minister in 1953; following his departure in 1962, the chapel remained without a minister.

The chapel eventually closed in the early 1980s and was subsequently demolished. Today, only a short section of the boundary wall and fence remains on the site. The adjacent land was later developed for housing, now known as the Nebo Estate, commemorating the historic chapel.
