= Blaenllechau =

Coordinates: 51.666667°N 3.446111°W

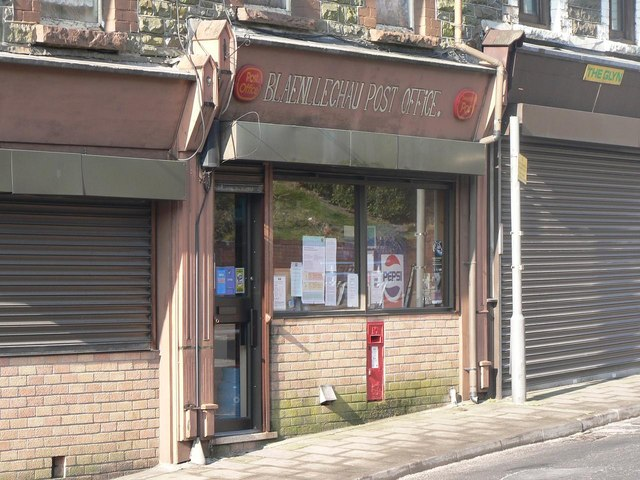
- Blaenllechau post office

- Location within Rhondda Cynon Taf
- OS grid reference: SS995975
- Principal area: Rhondda Cynon Taf
- Preserved county: Mid Glamorgan
- Country: Wales
- Sovereign state: United Kingdom
- Post town: FERNDALE
- Postcode district: CF43
- Dialling code: 01443
- Police: South Wales
- Fire: South Wales
- Ambulance: Welsh
- UK Parliament: Rhondda
- Senedd Cymru – Welsh Parliament: Rhondda

Blaenllechau is a small village located in the Rhondda Fach valley, Rhondda Cynon Taf, Wales. The neighbouring villages are Ferndale, Maerdy and Tylorstown. The population of Blaenllechau is less than 1,000. The village is defined by the river border, flowing between Blaenllechau and neighbouring Ferndale, of which the well-known Blaenllechau waterfall is a tributary.

== History ==
Originally a single farm in the Rhondda, in 1857 David Davis and his partners took a mineral rights lease in the area, and went exploring for high quality steam coal. In 1862, after many difficulties, the 4 feet seam was struck 278 yards (254 m) below the farm.

With little in the area, and the need to house workers and their families, the colliery village was developed alongside the workings of Ferndale No.1 pit. Eventually there were two shafts developed, Ferndale No. 1 and Ferndale No. 5, extracting steam coal from a depth of 400 yards (370 m) until 1959, when the entire complex was shut by the National Coal Board. The pit-head workings were still extant in the early 1960s, but have since been demolished and the shafts filled.

The village and its nearest town of Ferndale were served by passenger rail on the Maerdy Branch, which left the mainline of the Taff Vale Railway at Porth. Even under the ownership of the Great Western Railway, the line always found it hard to compete against local bus operators, although passenger services ran regularly from Pontypridd to Maerdy. Passenger services were ceased completely after the Beeching Axe decreased the size of British Railways in the 1960s, and the line operated as a mineral railway until the closure of the last of valley's collieries, Maerdy, in 1990.

The sites of both railway and colliery have been landscaped. A cricket and sports ground now stand on a slag and spoil tip called the 'Banana tip' because of its shape.

Blaenllechau was famously mentioned by Stanley Baker in the movie Hell Drivers. Baker's Character Tom Yately is asked where he is from and he replies "Blaenllechau".
