= Hebron Chapel, Ton Pentre =

Former chapel in Ton Pentre, Rhondda Cynon Taf, Wales

Coordinates: 51.6476°N 3.4874°W

Hebron Welsh Baptist Chapel
- Hebron Welsh Baptist Chapel
- Location: Church Street, Ton Pentre
- Country: Wales
- Denomination: Baptist

History
- Founded: 1870

Architecture
- Heritage designation: Grade II
- Architectural type: Chapel
- Style: Mid 19th century

Hebron, Ton Pentre was one of the largest Baptist churches in the Rhondda valleys during their industrial heyday. As membership increased the chapel was rebuilt in 1889 and a schoolroom added in 1908.

The chapel was a branch of Nebo, Ystrad Rhondda, which had evolved out of Ynysfach Chapel, the first Baptist cause in the Rhondda established in 1786. A small group of members from Nebo initially built a schoolroom at Pentre, in response to the rose in population in the 1860s and in 1868, 52 members from Nebo were released to form a church which was formally established on 7 November 1868. A week later the first Baptism was held at the church.

The church remained active through the twentieth century, and the Rev W.D. Morgan came there as minister from Bethesda, Tycroes in 1949. It celebrated its centenary in 1968. However, decline set in as the older generation died out and with them the traditional Welsh-speaking chapel-going tradition. The chapel closed in the later 1990s.
