= Archdeacon of Margam =

The Archdeacon of Margam is a senior cleric of the Diocese of Llandaff. The archdeacon is responsible for the disciplinary supervision of the clergy in the deaneries of Neath Port Talbot, Bridgend, Ystradyfodwg, and the Vale of Glamorgan.

The post was created in 1948.

== Archdeacons of Margam ==
- 1948-1960 Lawrence Thomas
- 1961-1965 Thomas Hughes, Assistant Bishop (afterwards Archdeacon of Llandaff, 1965)
- ?1965-1971 Eric Roberts (afterwards Bishop of St Davids, 1971)
- 1971-1981 David Reece (Assistant Bishop from 1977)
- 1981-1988 Albert Lewis (afterwards Archdeacon of Llandaff, 1988)
- 1988-1992 Gordon James
- 1992-2001 Martin Williams (afterwards Archdeacon of Morgannwg, 2002)
- 2001-2015 Philip Morris
- 2015–2018: vacant
- 2018–2024: Michael Komor
- 2024–present: Mark Preece (collated 11 February)
