= Eric Roberts (bishop) =

British Anglican bishop (1914–1997)

Eric Matthias Roberts (18 February 1914 – 29 March 1997) was a Bishop of St David's during the last quarter of the 20th century.

Educated at Friars School, Bangor and St Edmund Hall, Oxford he was ordained in 1939. After a curacy at Penmaenmawr, he was Sub-Warden of St. Michael's College, Llandaff and then Vicar of Port Talbot. After this he was the incumbent at Roath and then Archdeacon of Margam until his appointment to the episcopate in 1971. He retired in 1981.

Church in Wales titles
Preceded by John Richards	Bishop of St Davids; 1971–1981	Succeeded by George Noakes
