= Ferndale Colliery =

Group of South Wales coal mines 1857–1959

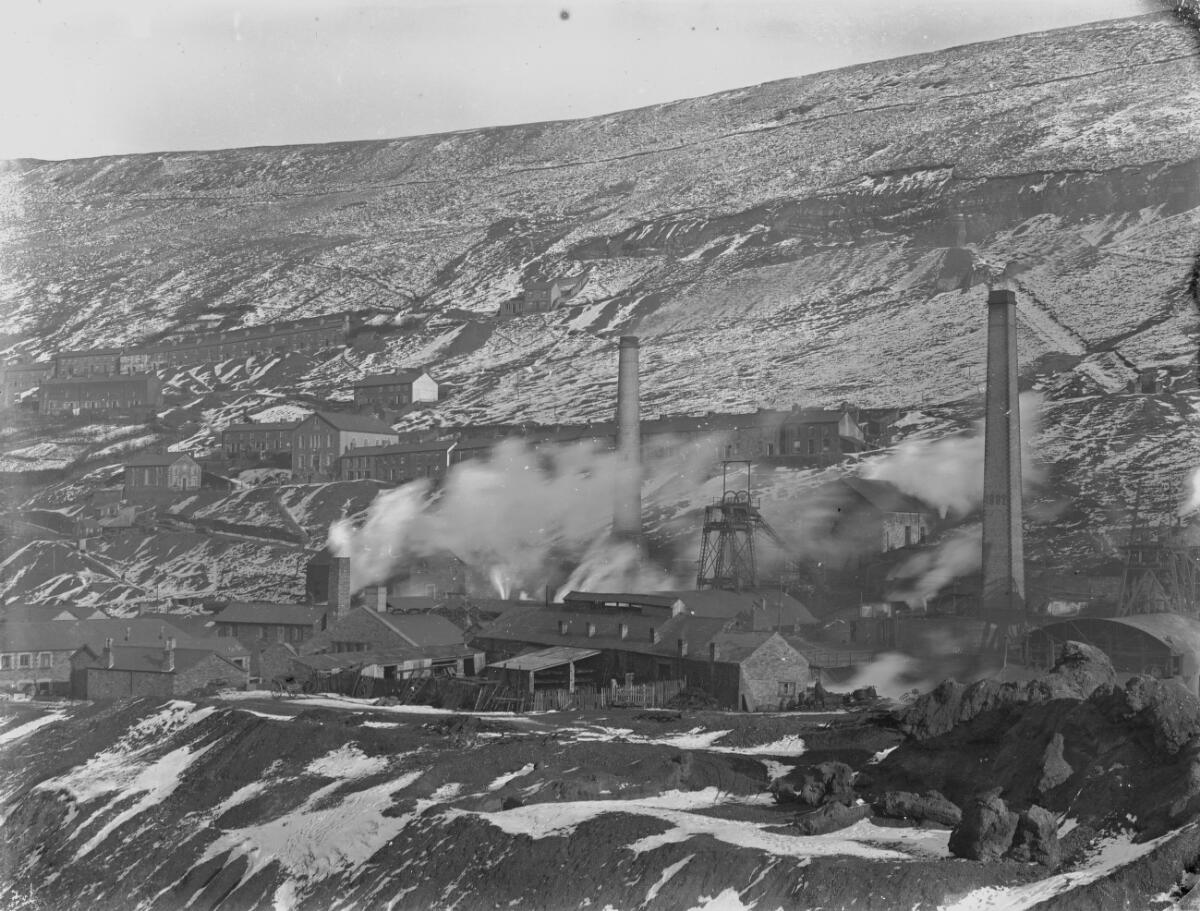

- Location in Wales
- Location: Ferndale, Rhondda Valley, Rhondda Cynon Taf, Wales; 51°39′48″N 3°27′12″W
- Products: Steam coal, ironstone
- Opened: 1857
- Closed: 1959
- Company: D. Davis & Sons Ltd. (1857–1930s); Powell Duffryn (1930s–1947); National Coal Board (1947–1959)
- Acquired: 1857

Ferndale Colliery was a major coal mining complex comprising nine interconnected coal mines that operated in the Rhondda Valley, South Wales, from 1857 to 1959. Established by coal owner David Davis, it became one of the most significant steam coal producers in the South Wales coalfield.

The colliery was notable for two major explosions in 1867 and 1869 that killed 231 miners, and for containing the deepest pit in the Rhondda Valley at 606 yards. After nationalisation in 1947, the complex gradually closed due to economic pressures, with the final closure in 1959 ending over a century of coal extraction.

== History ==
=== Early development (1857–1880s) ===
Ferndale Colliery originated from the ambitious vision of David Davis, a prominent Welsh coal owner who had already established successful operations in the neighbouring Aberdare Valley. In 1857, Davis leased the mineral rights to 500 acres of land at Blaenllechau, then a largely agricultural area in the previously undeveloped Rhondda Fach valley.

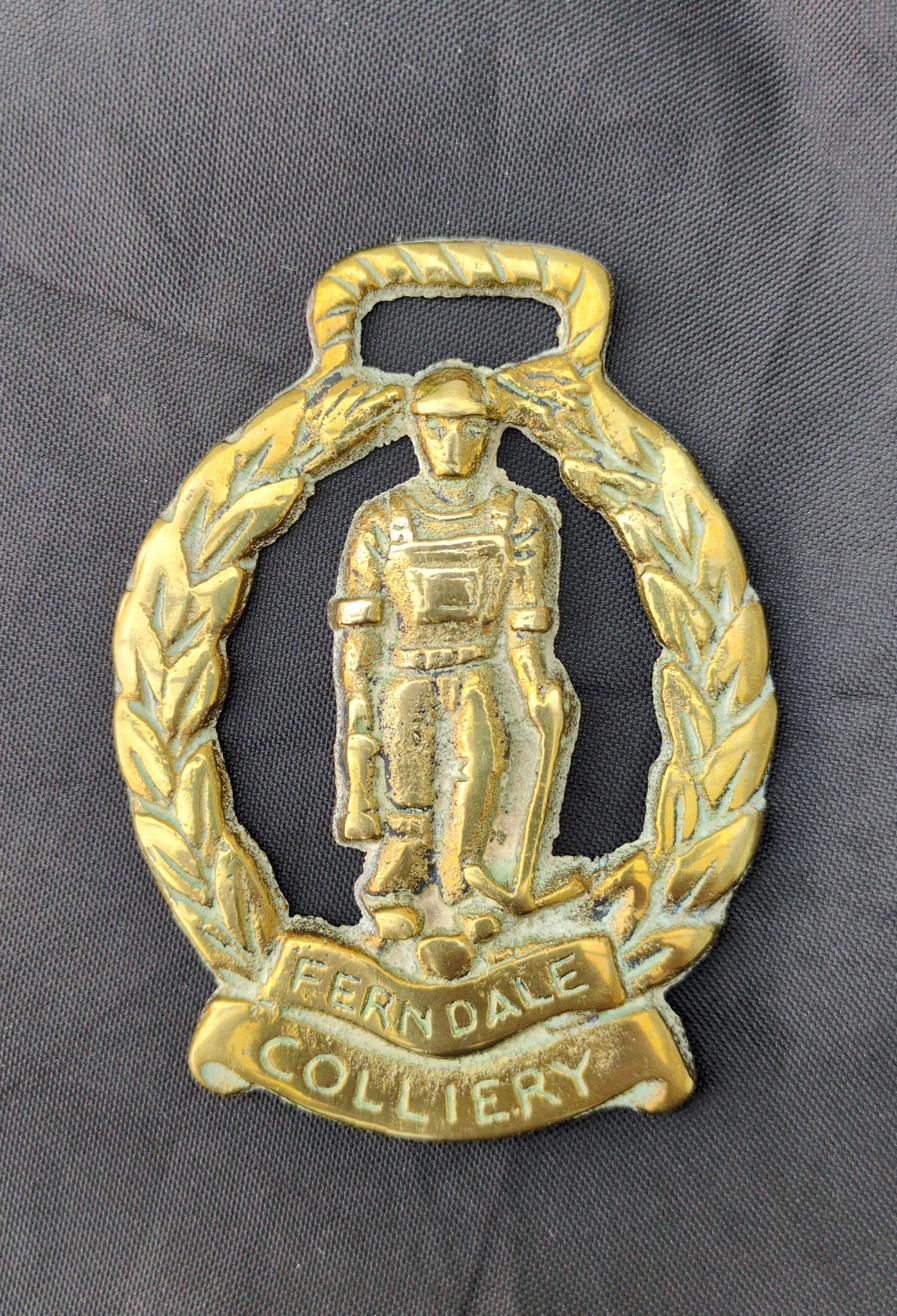
A surviving horse brass from Ferndale Colliery, now a collectible piece of Welsh industrial heritage representing the working horse tradition in coal mining.

The initial development proved extremely challenging. Davis's first attempts to access the profitable No. 3 Rhondda seam failed completely, nearly leading him to abandon the venture. However, encouraged by his sons who had greater faith in the area's potential, Davis persevered and decided to sink deeper to reach the unproven steam coal seams that had shown promise in the Cynon Valley. The sinking of Ferndale No.1 pit began in 1859, and after considerable difficulties including flooding and unstable ground conditions, the Four-Feet seam was finally struck at a depth of 278 yards in June 1862.

Production began cautiously in 1864 with only 11,138 tons of coal extracted in the first year. However, this modest beginning marked a historic milestone as Ferndale No.1 became the first colliery in the Rhondda Fach specifically developed to work high-quality steam coal. The discovery of commercially viable steam coal seams at unprecedented depths in the Rhondda Valley encouraged other investors and mining companies to explore the region, fundamentally transforming what had been a sparsely populated rural area.

The early workforce, numbering approximately 40 sinkers, was initially housed in a single hostel, while the first miners and their families were accommodated in wooden huts known as the 'Barracks'. By 1867, The Times reported a population of around 800 people living in these "crudely constructed wooden huts 'like American log huts'". As production expanded and the workforce grew, these temporary structures were gradually replaced by more permanent stone terraced housing built by the colliery company.

=== Expansion and consolidation (1890s–1910s) ===
Following David Davis's death in 1866, his sons Lewis and David took control of the family business, with Lewis assuming primary responsibility until his own death in 1888. Control then devolved to Lewis's son, Frederick Lewis Davis, and in 1890 the operation was formally incorporated as David Davis and Sons Limited. By this time, the company had acquired or developed additional pits across the area, with Davis purchasing the existing Bodringallt colliery (No.3) in 1890 and the company acquiring the Tylorstown collieries in 1894.

A major transformation occurred in 1907 with the completion of Tylorstown No.9, the final and ninth pit in the complex. This achievement marked the formal consolidation of all operations under the unified name "Ferndale Colliery", as the extensive underground workings had been connected to create a single integrated mining complex. The consolidated operation could now access coal from seven distinct seams: Two Feet Nine, Four Feet, Five Feet, Bute, Gellideg, Red, and Yard seams, as well as extracting ironstone as a secondary product.

Technological advancement was a hallmark of this period. In 1908, the company undertook a comprehensive electrification programme, installing an electric winder at the new No.9 pit, replacing steam ventilation fans with electric alternatives, and converting all colliery machinery including haulages, pumping equipment, and surface plant to electric motors. To support this modernisation, the company constructed its own power plant adjacent to pits No.8 and No.9.

By 1914, the integrated Ferndale complex had become one of the largest coal producers in South Wales, employing 5,654 men and achieving an annual output of 1,750,000 tons. The deepest mine in the complex, Cynllwyn Du (No.8), reached 606 yards below the surface, making it the deepest pit in the entire Rhondda Valley at that time.

=== Corporate changes and peak production (1920s–1930s) ===
The interwar period brought significant changes in ownership and operational structure. The Ferndale operations became part of larger corporate consolidations that characterised the Welsh coal industry during this era. By the mid-1920s, the complex had been absorbed into the Cambrian Combine, which was subsequently incorporated into Welsh Associated Collieries Limited in 1927.

The most significant corporate transformation occurred in 1935 when Welsh Associated Collieries merged with Powell Duffryn to form Powell Duffryn Associated Collieries Limited. This merger created one of Britain's largest coal companies, with an annual output exceeding 20 million tons and representing more than a third of total South Wales coal production. At the time of the merger, the Ferndale pits employed 4,115 men and produced one million tons of coal annually from eight different seams.

However, the 1930s also marked the beginning of economic pressures that would ultimately lead to the complex's decline. As the most accessible coal reserves in the shallower shafts became exhausted, Powell Duffryn made the strategic decision to close several pits as independent production units. Pits No.2, No.3, No.4, No.6, No.7, and No.8 were all closed by 1936, though the workable underground coal faces were consolidated and accessed through the remaining operational shafts. No.3 (Bodringallt) was retained as a ventilation shaft for the continuing operations at No.1 and No.5.

=== Wartime operations and nationalisation (1940s–1950s) ===
By the outbreak of World War II, only three pits remained in active production: No.1, No.5, and No.9. During the war, the colliery played a crucial role in maintaining coal supplies for the war effort, with operations continuing under government oversight. The wartime period also saw the introduction of the Bevin Boys scheme, which brought conscripted young men to work in the mines as an alternative to military service.

The election of a Labour government in 1945 led to the nationalisation of Britain's coal industry. On 'Vesting Day', 1 January 1947, Ferndale Colliery, along with all other British coal mines, was transferred to the newly-established National Coal Board (NCB). The South Wales coalfield became part of the NCB's South-Western Division, with the Ferndale pits assigned to the No.3 (Rhondda) Area's No.1 Group.

Under nationalisation, the remaining pits continued to operate successfully. No.1 pit worked the Yard and Two-Feet-Eight seams, No.5 pit extracted coal from the Yard and Two-Feet-Nine seams, and No.9 pit accessed the Two-Feet-Eight, Yard, and Gellideg seams. The complex maintained its own coal preparation plant, road transport depot, and coalface prop repair workshop. In 1945, the combined workforce of pits No.1 and No.5 totalled 768 men.

However, the 1950s brought increasing economic pressures as the NCB implemented policies to close smaller, less economical pits while reorganising larger operations. Despite continued production and investment in safety improvements, including water infusion systems to suppress airborne coal dust tested in 1944, the Ferndale complex could not escape the broader trend of colliery closures affecting the South Wales coalfield.

The end came in 1959 when the NCB closed the remaining Ferndale pits (No.1 and No.5), followed by the closure of Tylorstown No.9 in October 1960. This marked the end of over a century of coal extraction at Ferndale, concluding an operation that had begun as a pioneering venture into the untapped steam coal resources of the Rhondda Valley and had grown to become one of the most significant mining complexes in South Wales.

== Disasters ==
Two large colliery disasters occurred in Ferndale during the 19th century.

On Friday 8 November 1867, the whole district was shaken by two consecutive explosions at Ferndale No.1. Rescuers were hampered by roof falls, and with the air so foul, with some trepidation the furnace which powered the ventilation was relit. It took a month to recover the remains of the 178 men and boys, with most bodies showing signs of severe burning, and many so badly disfigured it made identification impossible. At the subsequent enquiry, the lamp keeper stated that safety locks had been tampered with, and incidents regularly occurred that breached the company's rules. Although reported to the mine manager, these breaches were ignored. The jury concluded:

We believe the explosion took place, first: in consequence of a great accumulation of gas in certain workings of the colliery. This accumulation we attribute to the neglect of Mr. Williams the manager and his subordinate officers. Second: by this gas being fired by one or more of the colliers carelessly taking off the tops of their lamps and working with naked lights

Just 17 months later, on 10 June 1869, another explosion occurred killing 53 men and boys. The resultant inquest criticised the managers of the pit for not implementing all the recommendations made after the 1867 explosion. Further they criticised the pits ventilation system, which they concluded did not manage to properly distribute air throughout all the pit.

On 13 February 1908, 55-year-old former Private Thomas Chester, who 29 years earlier had been one of the defenders during the Battle of Rorke's Drift by thousands of Zulu warriors, was killed in the railway sidings of the coal washery at No.5 pit. Working as a coal trimmer, after allowing two wagons to pass, he stepped onto the railway tracks to break up a lump of coal which had fallen onto the empty road leading to No.1 pit screens. He was knocked down and killed by a wagon, which was being lowered towards the screens, not aware that others wagons were to follow.

On January 26, 1911, 22 year old Leonard Henry Rees, was killed at Ferndale No. 1 from a fall of roof stone at working face. He left behind a young wife, Ada, and 4 month old daughter, Irene.

== Ferndale pits ==
Map of Ferndale and Tylorstown Collieries in the Rhondda Valley, Wales. The numbered pits (1-9) represent the main collieries, with Ferndale pits (1-7) shown in grey and Tylorstown pits (8-9) in red. The map shows the extensive mining operations that operated from the 1850s to 1960.

Collieries in Ferndale
Number	Name	Date sunk	Date closed	Shaft Depth	Employment 1908	Employment 1923	Employment 1945	Notes
1	Blaenllechau	1857	1959	200 yards (180 m)	999	1,198	768*	First pit sunk in the Rhondda to work steam coal. After sinking of No.5, was extended to same depth
2		1870	1936	225 yards (206 m)	112	1,032*	Closed	1,540 yards North of No.1, located next to No.4. Closed before the outbreak of World War II
3	Bodringallt	1864	1936	238 yards (218 m)	653		Closed	Sunk in 1864 by Warner Simpson and Company. Bought by David Davies in 1890. Sold to Cory Brothers before 1923. Closed from 1936, used as a ventilation shaft for No.1 & No.5
4		1876	1936	300 yards (270 m)	632	1,032*	???	1,540 yards North of No.1, located next to No.2. Closed before the outbreak of World War II
5		1889	1959	358 yards (327 m)	1,096	1,089	768*	40 yards North from No.1
6 Tylorstown	Pendyrys No.1	1876	1936	464 yards (424 m)	2,912**	567	Closed	1.5 miles (2.4 km) south of No.1, developed by Alfred Tylor's Colliery Company
7 Tylorstown	Pendyrys No.2	1876	1936	464 yards (424 m)	2,912**		Closed	1.5 miles (2.4 km) south of No.1, developed by Alfred Tylor's Colliery Company
8 Tylorstown	Cynllwyn Du	1858	1936	606 yards (554 m)	2,912**	1,167	Closed	Sunk by Thomas Wayne as Pont y Gwaith in 1858, it was renamed Cynllwyn Du. Closed, it was reopened by David Davies in 1892 to access the Gellideg seam. Extended to a depth of 606 yards, it was the deepest mine in the Rhondda
9 Tylorstown		1907	1960	550 yards (500 m)	2,912**	765		
