= Hugh Jones =

Hugh or Hughie Jones may refer to:

== Law and politics ==
- Hugh M. Jones (1892–1978), American politician in Wisconsin
- Hugh R. Jones (1914–2001), American jurist
- Hugh Jones (politician) (born 1966), Australian politician

== Religion ==
- Hugh Jones (bishop) (1508–1574), Welsh Anglican bishop
- Hugh Jones (archdeacon of Essex) (1783–1869), Welsh churchman
- Hugh Jones (archdeacon of St Asaph) (c. 1816–1897), British religious leader
- Hughie Jones (1927–2016), British religious leader

== Sports ==
- Hugh Jones (footballer) (1876–?), Welsh footballer
- Hugh Jones (tennis) (1880–1960), American tennis player
- Hugh Jones (cricketer) (1889–1918), English cricketer
- Hugh Jones (weightlifter) (1930–1965), New Zealand weightlifter
- Hugh Jones (runner) (born 1955), British runner

== Others ==
- Hugh Jones (professor) (1691–1760), American mathematician
- Hugh Bolton Jones (1848–1927), American painter
- Hugh Jones (producer), British record producer

== Other uses ==
- Hugh Jones (comics), fictional Marvel comic book character

== See also ==
- Wynn Hugh-Jones (1923–2019), British diplomat
- Hugh Eyton-Jones (1863–1943), British clergyman
- Hugh Lloyd-Jones (1922–2009), British classical scholar
- Hugo Jones (1904–1970), British historian of classical antiquity
- Hugh Johnys (15th century), Welsh knight
