= Eynsham =

Village in Oxfordshire, England

Coordinates: 51.781°N 1.375°W

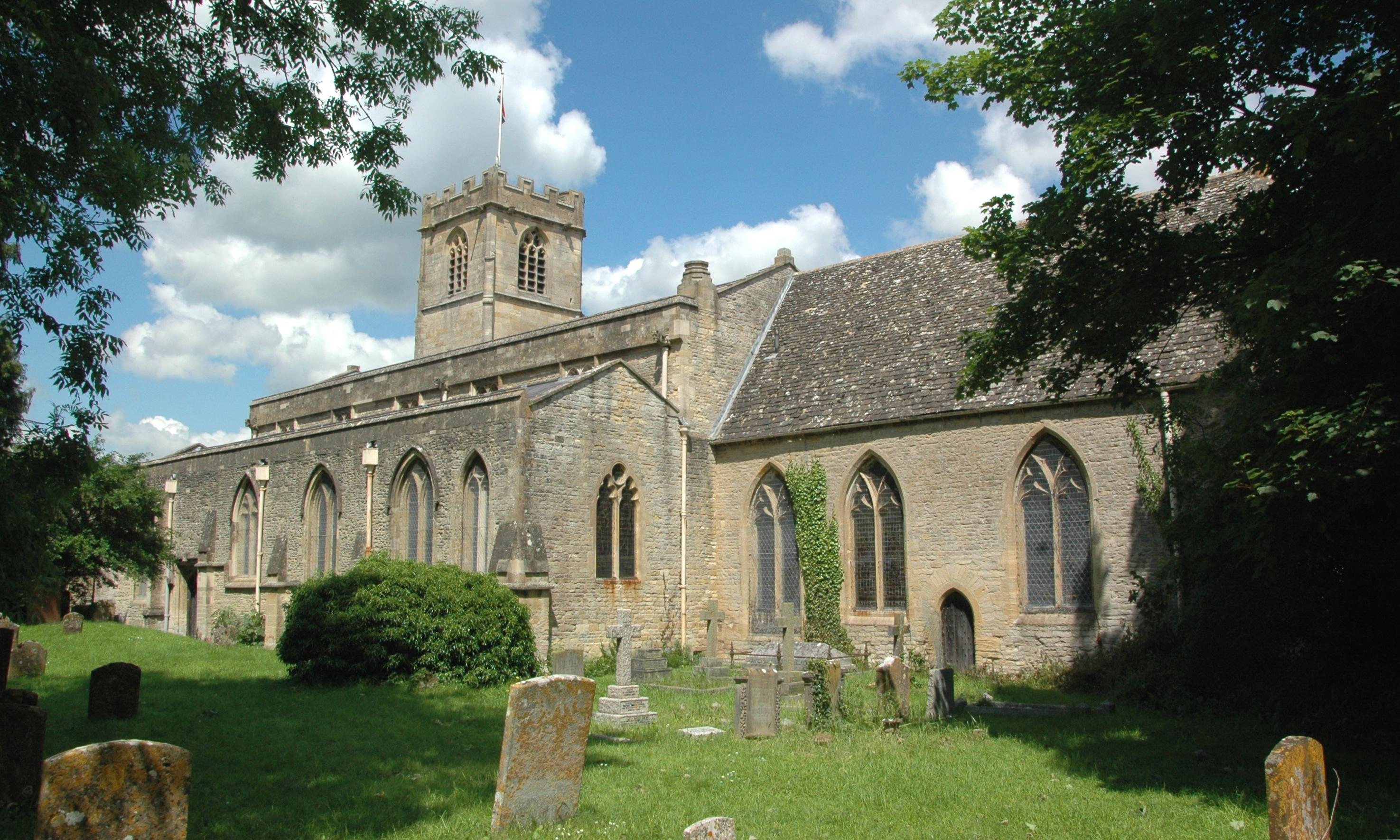
- St Leonard's parish church

- Location within Oxfordshire
- Population: 4,648 (parish, including Barnard Gate) (2011 Census)
- OS grid reference: SP4309
- Civil parish: Eynsham
- District: West Oxfordshire
- Shire county: Oxfordshire
- Region: South East
- Country: England
- Sovereign state: United Kingdom
- Post town: WITNEY
- Postcode district: OX29
- Dialling code: 01865
- Police: Thames Valley
- Fire: Oxfordshire
- Ambulance: South Central
- UK Parliament: Bicester and Woodstock
- Website: Eynsham Online!

Eynsham /ˈɛnʃəm/ is a village and civil parish in the West Oxfordshire district, in Oxfordshire, England, about 5 miles (8 km) north-west of Oxford and east of Witney. The 2011 Census recorded a parish population of 4,648. It was estimated at 5,087 in 2020.

== Etymology ==
Eynsham's name is first attested in the Anglo-Saxon Chronicle, which took its present form in the later ninth century, as Egonesham. (The Chronicle portrays the settlement as one of four captured by a West Saxon named Cuthwulf in 571 CE following the Battle of Bedcanford. The historicity of the battle is, however, in doubt.) The name is thought to derive from the Old English personal name Ægen, in its genitive form Ægenes, combined with the word hamm ("river-meadow"). Thus the name once meant "Ægen's river-meadow".

== History ==
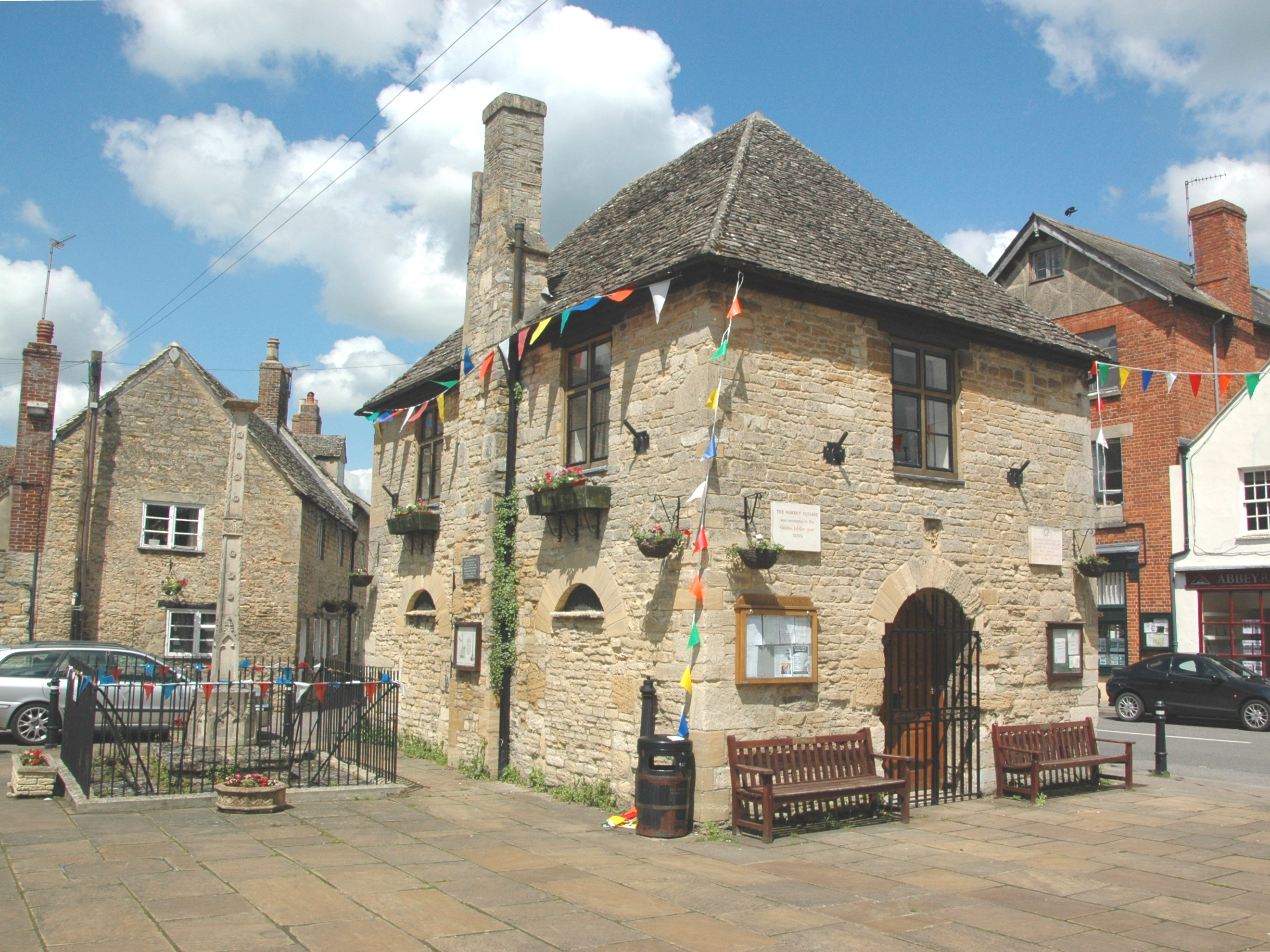
Bartholomew Room in The Square

Eynsham grew up near the historically important ford of Swinford on the River Thames flood plain. Excavations have shown that the site was used in the Bronze Age (3000–300 BCE) for a rectilinear enclosure edging a gravel terrace. Evidence has been found of 6th–7th-century Saxon buildings at New Wintles Farm, about three-quarters of a mile (1 km) from the present parish church. There is evidence that Eynsham had an early minster, probably founded in the 7th or 8th centuries. In the reign of the early ninth-century Mercian king Cenwulf, Eynsham was the site of a royal manor of three-hundred hides.

In 1005 Aethelmar, kinsman of Aethelred II founded a Benedictine abbey on the site of the earlier minster. The first abbot was Ælfric of Eynsham, a prolific writer in Old English. The Domesday Book of 1086 includes a paragraph on the settlement, then known as Eglesham. By 1302 Eynsham had a wharf handling cargo that included hay, straw, malt, grain and timber, beside the later Talbot Inn on Wharf Stream, a tributary of the Thames. By the medieval period Eynsham Abbey was among the largest in the area. It succumbed to the Reformation in 1538 and few remains can be seen today. After the dissolution, its estates were granted to Sir George Darcy.

By 1790 a newly completed Oxford Canal was trading with Eynsham Wharf, mainly to sell coal from the Midlands. From 1792 the Oxford Canal employed a wharfinger at Eynsham and in 1800 bought the lease of the wharf. It consolidated its position by buying the Talbot Inn in 1845 and the freehold of Eynsham Wharf in 1849, perhaps in response to the railway mania that was taking traffic from canals and navigations. Eynsham Lock, on the Thames just above the confluence with Wharf Stream, was the last flash lock on the Thames, not rebuilt as a pound lock until 1928. The village suffered several fires in its history. Among the worst were a Whit Monday morning one in 1629, which destroyed 12 houses and another in 1681 that destroyed 20. By the early 19th century the parish had its own fire engine in a parish fire station on the ground floor of the early 18th-century Bartholomew Room, where it remained up to 1949.

The Bartholomew Room was built in 1703 from an endowment of John Liam Bartholomew in 1701 to found a parish charity school. Its lower storey was arcaded, presumably as market premises, but the arcades were walled up in the later 19th century. While some parts of the ground floor continued to serve as the fire station; others were turned into a village gaol. From 1928, a local Roman Catholic congregation used the upper room for its services. In 1983 the parish council bought and restored the building.

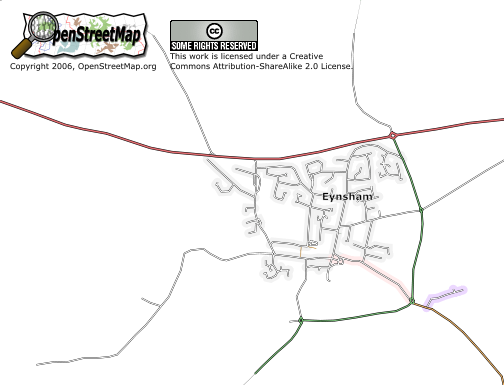
Map of the village

=== Roads ===
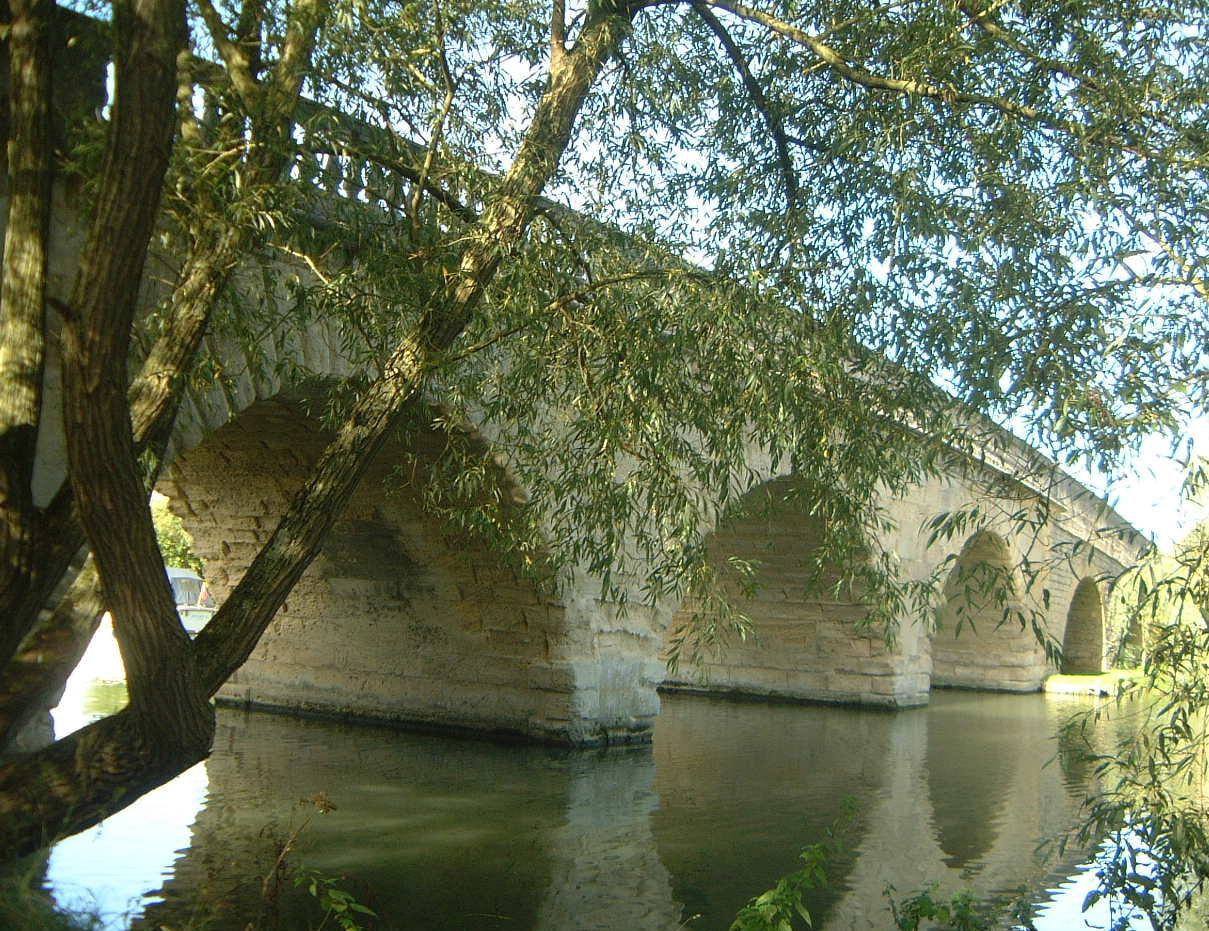
Swinford Bridge over the Thames

By the mid-18th century, Swinford had a ferry, but the main road was in poor condition. Heavier road traffic between Oxford and Witney preferred to pass further north via Bladon, where the better-maintained Oxford–Woodstock and Witney–Woodstock roads met. When the latter became a turnpike in 1751, the road via Eynsham and Swinford ferry was included as a branch. In 1769 the Earl of Abingdon opened Swinford Toll Bridge to replace the ferry. The Witney–Woodstock road ceased to be a turnpike in 1869, but the Witney–Oxford road remained one until 1877. Eynsham was a major coaching stop on the London–Fishguard road. Since 1922 this has been numbered as the A40. There is a planned expansion of the A40 between Eynsham and Witney into a dual carriage way, with work expected to commence in 2023 should planning permission be granted. In 1936 a bypass for the main road was built north of the village and the road over Swinford bridge renumbered as B4044.

=== Rail ===
The Witney Railway between Witney and Yarnton opened through Eynsham parish in 1861. The station was on the south side of the village. The Great Western Railway took over the line in 1890 and enlarged Eynsham station in 1944. British Railways closed the line to passenger trains in 1962 and in 1970 to goods traffic. The track was dismantled. The station has since been demolished and a business park built there. In February 2015 the Witney Oxford Transport Group proposed reopening the station as an alternative to improving the A40 road as proposed by Oxfordshire County Council. The case centred on the severe traffic congestion on the roads to and from Oxford.

=== Industry ===
Local industries include gravel extraction and a factory for superconducting magnets, Siemens Magnet Technology Ltd.

Low Carbon Hub installed its first rooftop solar panels in Eynsham in 2013, developed in partnership with GreenTEA (Green Transition Eynsham Area), a local community energy group.

== Churches ==
=== Church of England ===
The Church of England parish church, St Leonard's, was built the 13th century. In the 15th, the nave was rebuilt, a clerestory and north aisle were added and a west tower was built. There are Mass dials on the south wall. The building was restored three times: by William Wilkinson in 1856, Harry Drinkwater in 1892 and over eight years in the 1980s. The west tower has a ring of six bells. James Keene of Woodstock cast the third in 1653. Richard Keene cast the fifth in 1673. John Taylor & Co of Loughborough cast or recast the treble, second, fourth and tenor bells in 1895. The church also has a Sanctus bell that Mears and Stainbank of the Whitechapel Bell Foundry cast in 1924. St Leonard's is a Grade II* listed building.

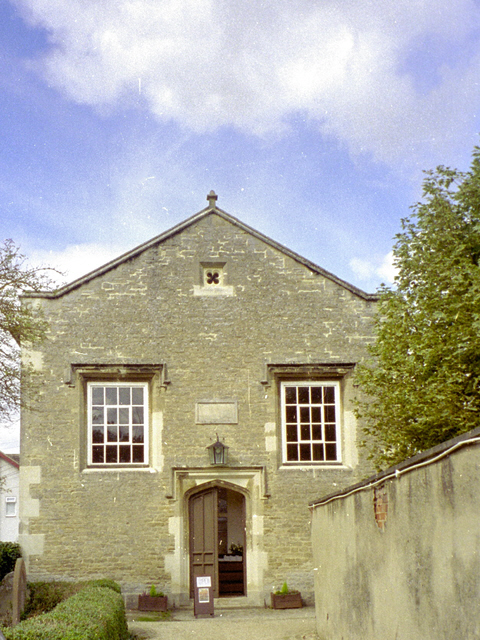
Eynsham Baptist Church

=== Baptist ===
The Baptist church in Lombard Street was opened in either 1808 or 1818.

=== Roman Catholic ===
In 1895 Herbert May founded a Roman Catholic mission at his home, Newland Lodge. The lodge burnt down in 1897, after which Mass was said at the Railway Inn until May had a new house built for him. The mission closed when May moved to Oxford. In 1928 the Roman Catholic parish of Witney leased the upper storey of the Bartholomew Room, making it St Peter's Chapel. Building of a new Roman Catholic church began in the 1930s but was delayed by the Second World War and completed only in 1967.

== Amenities ==
Eynsham Primary School is a community primary school. Eynsham's Bartholomew School is the county secondary school for the district. As a specialist technology college, it draws pupils mainly from primaries at Eynsham, Standlake, Stanton Harcourt, Freeland, Cassington and Hanborough.

Eynsham Football Club plays in the Oxfordshire Senior League Division One. Eynsham Sports and Social Club plays in Witney and District Football League Division Three and its reserve team in Division Four. Eynsham Cricket Club plays in Oxfordshire Cricket Association League Division Three.

Eynsham has a Women's Institute and a Morris dancing troupe.

== Notable residents ==
In order of birth:

- Dida of Eynsham (late 7th century), a Mercian noble
- Ælfric of Eynsham (c. 955 – c. 1010), a monk, abbot and religious writer
- Adam of Eynsham (early 13th century), a monk, abbot and writer
- Anthony Kitchin (1471–1563) became Abbot of Eynsham, then Bishop of Llandaff.
- Thomas Jordan (c. 1612–1685), child actor and poet, may have been born in Eynsham, where his family had land.
- John Deval (1710–1774), Master Mason to the King
- E. K. Chambers (1866–1954), Shakespeare scholar and local historian, retired to Eynsham and died there.
- Eric Gordon (1905–1992), Bishop of Sodor and Man, retired to Eynsham and died there.
- Mollie Harris (1913–1995), actress and author, lived in Eynsham and wrote a book about it: From Acre End, 1982.
- Kingsley Amis (1922-1995), author, lived in Eynsham with his wife Hilary Amis in 1948 where she gave birth to their first child, Philip.
- Tommy Vance (1940–2005) was a BBC Radio 1 and Virgin Radio disc jockey born in Eynsham.
- Anthony J. Batten (born 1940), Canadian visual artist, was born at Eynsham Hall.
- Marc Hudson (born 1987), singer for power metal band DragonForce
- James Baird 'Jimmy' Montgomery, MC & Bar, MM (1894–1987), Canadian military war hero and professional footballer

== See also ==
- Crossings of the River Thames
- Locks on the River Thames
- Tilgarsley

== Bibliography ==
- Aston, Michael; Bond, James (1976). The Landscape of Towns. Archaeology in the Field Series. London: J.M. Dent & Sons Ltd. pp. 81–83, 97–98. ISBN 0-460-04194-0.
- Blair, John (1994). Anglo Saxon Oxfordshire. Stroud: Alan Sutton Publishing. p. 63. ISBN 0-7509-0147-0.
- Chambers, Sir Edmund (1936). Eynsham Under the Monks. Vol. XVIII. Oxfordshire Record Society.
- Compton, Hugh J (1976). The Oxford Canal. Newton Abbot: David & Charles. pp. 58–59. ISBN 0-7153-7238-6.
- Crossley, Alan; Elrington, C.R, eds. (1990). A History of the County of Oxford. Victoria County History. Vol. 12: Wootton Hundred (South) including Woodstock. London: Oxford University Press for the Institute of Historical Research. pp. 98–158. ISBN 978-0-19722-774-9.
- Emery, Frank (1974). The Oxfordshire Landscape. The Making of the English Landscape. London: Hodder & Stoughton. pp. 40, 42, 53, 55, 56, 111, 118, 148, 150, 163, 164, 167, 191, 192, 209. ISBN 0-340-04301-6.
- Keevil, G.D. (1995). In Harvey's House and God's House. Thames Valley Landscape Series. Vol. 6. Oxford: Oxford University School of Archaeology. ISBN 0-904220-10-9.
- Page, WH, ed. (1907). A History of the County of Oxford. Victoria County History. Vol. 2: Ecclesiastical History, etc. Westminster: Archibald Constable & Co. p. 156.
- Rowley, Trevor (1978). Villages in the Landscape. Archaeology in the Field Series. London: J.M. Dent & Sons Ltd. p. 137. ISBN 0-460-04166-5.
- Sherwood, Jennifer; Pevsner, Nikolaus (1974). Oxfordshire. The Buildings of England. Harmondsworth: Penguin Books. pp. 600–603. ISBN 0-14-071045-0.
