= Edwyn ap Gwriad =

King of Gwent

Edwyn ap Gwriad (known as Edwin of Gwent in English and referred to as this in English language sources) was a Welsh king of Gwent from 1015 to 1045. Edwyn is thought to have overthrown his uncles, Rhodri ap Elisedd and Gruffydd ap Elisedd (sometimes spelled Elise). However, his place in royal Welsh geneaology is unclear, but he is considered to be the last independent king of Gwent who did not hold the kingdom through any fealty to the Saxons across the borders with England. He was later imprisoned and blinded by his dispossessor and successor, Meurig ap Hywel of Morgannwg, the son of Hywel ab Owain. The Anglo-Saxon name "Edwyn", along with Gwent's proximity to the English marches, seems to imply some degree of relationship with early English rulers of the time.

During a conflict between soldiers in Edwyn's household and men who worked for Bledri, Bishop of Llandaff (d/1022), Bledri attempted to intervened and bring calm to the situation, but was somehow wounded in the incident. Bishop Bledri survived but as a result of the incident, Edwyn and his men involved in the wounding were subject to excommunication by a synod of the church. This was a very serious punishment in that era. Edwyn's lands in Gwent were placed under an interdict by the church, which meant that religious rites and services, key to medieval life, which would normally have been performed by churchmen, would not take place. Eventually the two parties reached an agreement about compensation for the wrong done to Bledri. This included a royal vill belonging to Edwyn (thought today to have been Undy in Monmouthshire) being gifted to the See of Llandaff as a means of apology.

Regnal titles
Preceded by Rhodri ap Elisedd and Gruffydd ap Elisedd	King of Gwent; 1015–1045	Succeeded by Meurig ap Hywel
