= Amanuensis =

Person who takes dictation or copies what another writes

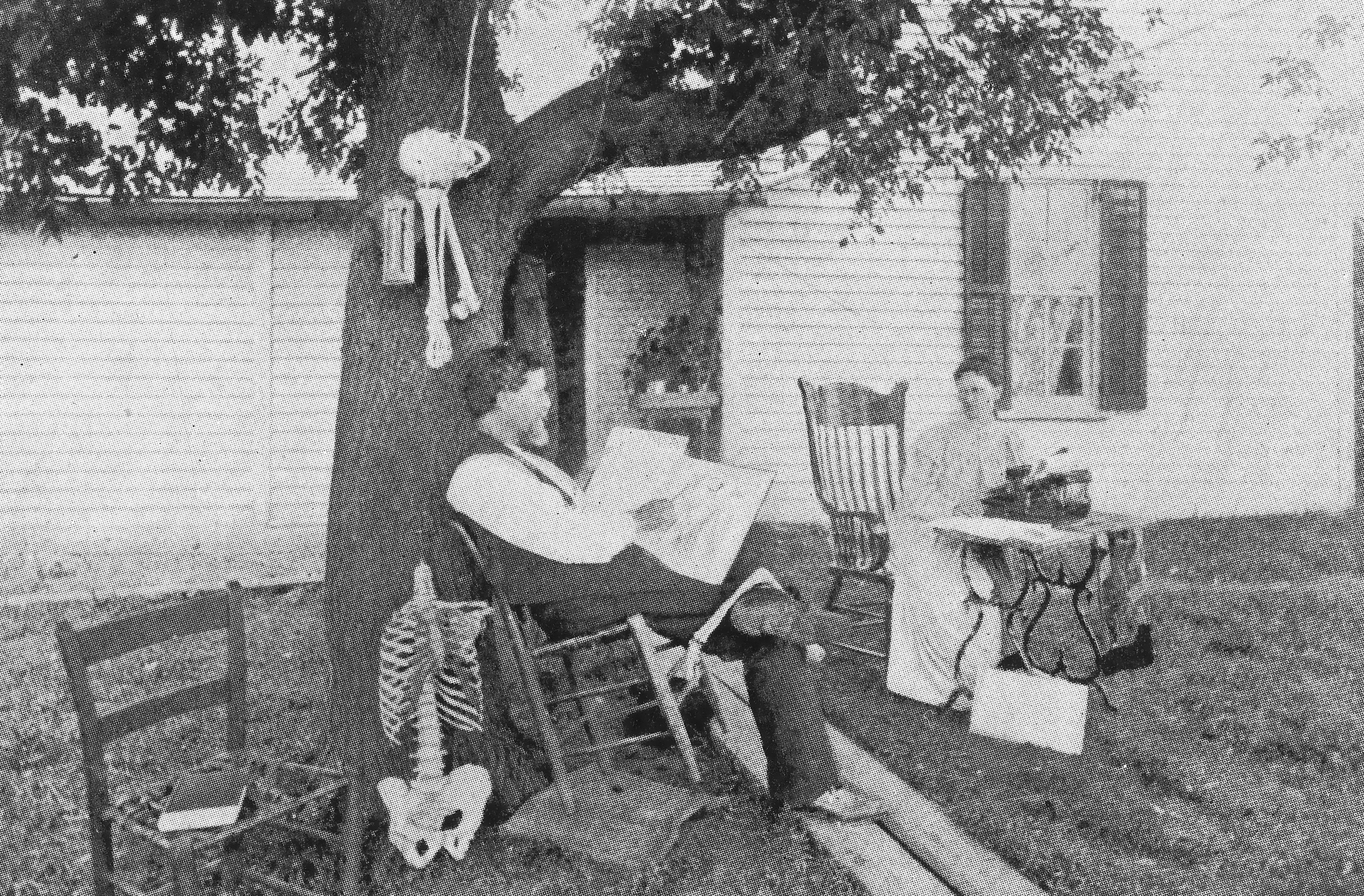
Andrew Taylor Still with his amanuensis, Annie Morris, who is at a typewriter

An amanuensis (/əˌmænjuˈɛnsɪs/ ə-MAN-yoo-EN-sis) (pl. amanuenses /əˌmænjuˈɛnsiːz/ ə-MAN-yoo-EN-seez) or scribe is a person employed to write or type what another dictates or to copy what has been written by another.

In some academic contexts, an amanuensis can assist an injured or disabled person in taking written examinations. It may also be a person who signs a document on behalf of another under the latter's authority.

== History ==
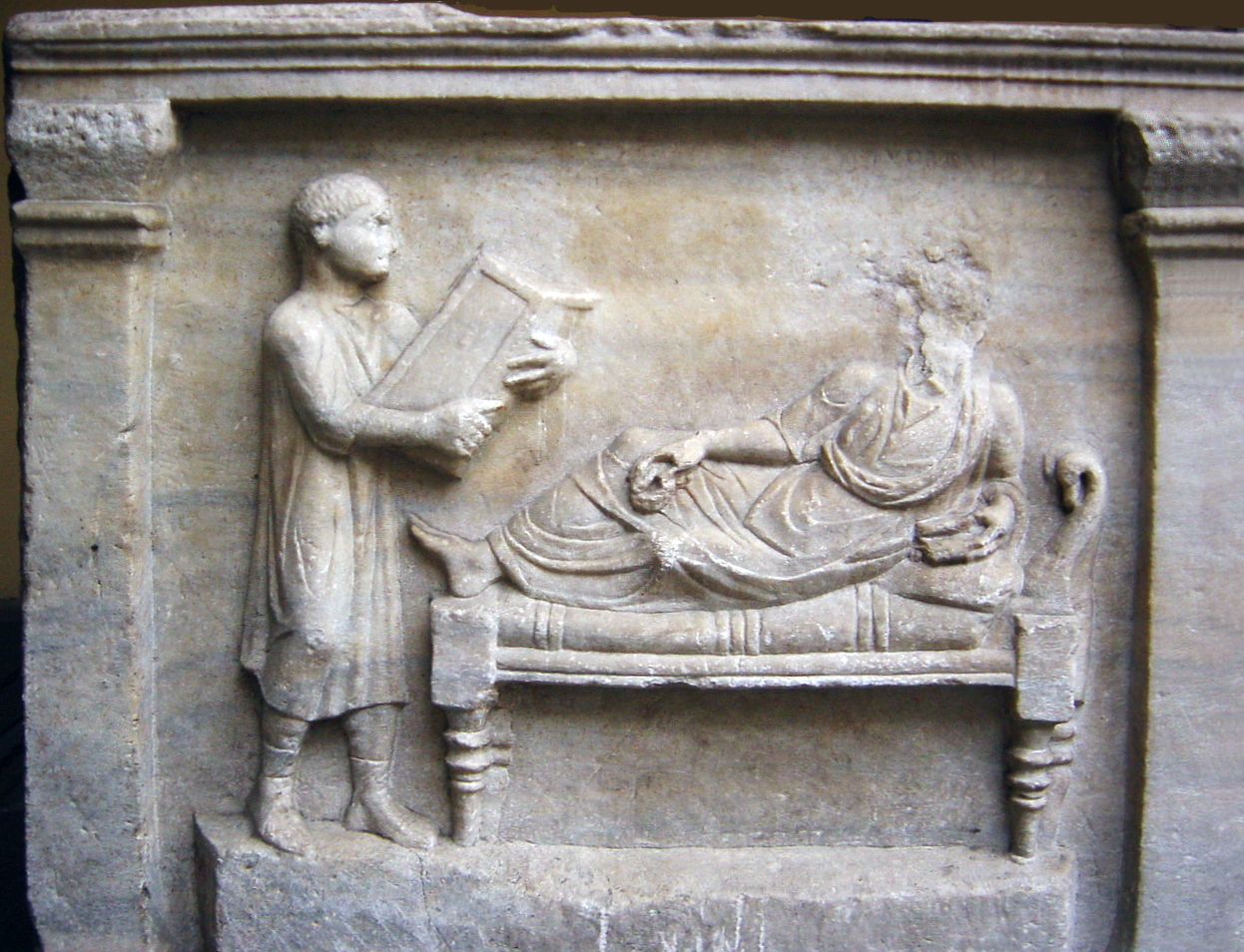
Sarcophagus relief of Valerius Petronianus, with his slave holding writing tablets (4th century AD)

In ancient Rome, an amanuensis (Latin āmanuēnsis, “secretary”, from ab-, “from” + manus, “hand”) was a slave or freedperson who provided literary and secretarial services such as taking dictation and perhaps assisting in composition. Amanuenses were typically Greek, might be either male or female, and were among the higher-status slaves in ancient Rome who were considered to add value to their masters' lives rather than serving as mere instruments of production. Literary slaves had certain privileges under the law and could be manumitted at a younger age.

Amanuenses played an extensive role in medieval writing and the dissemination of texts. Visionaries in particular relied on amanuenses to translate their experiences into written form. One question in studies of the Christian mystic Margery Kempe, not known to have received a formal education, is the extent to which her amanuenses shaped her self-titled book, completed in 1438. The work of the amanuensis when the author was minimally or not literate likely involved taking dictation, reading back, getting feedback from the author for revision, and possibly shaping the text further during transcription. An amanuensis might bring literary polish to visionary experience, as Adam of Eynsham, for instance, is thought to have drawn on the underworld book of the Aeneid to shape the "rather rambling and confused" visions of his brother Edmund. An amanuensis might act as a translator as well as transcriber. For example, Petrus of Alvastra (aka Peter Olafsson) wrote down the visions of Bridget of Sweden as she recounted them in Swedish, and then translated them into Latin.

== Other uses ==
In Finland, an amanuenssi is an administrative employee of a university, research institution or museum. In Finnish universities, amanuenses can be involved with student guidance counseling, organising course activities, etc.

== Job titles ==
In French, "écrivain public" is a term for someone who provides writing services, particularly for those with limited ability to write.

== See also ==
- Scrivener
