= Blethyn =

Blethyn is a surname. Notable people with the surname include:

- Bleddyn ap Cynfyn (died 1075), Welsh king
- William Blethyn (died 1591), British bishop
- Brenda Blethyn (born 1946), British actress
- Geoff Blethyn (born 1950), Australian footballer
