= Bledri =

Welsh bishop

Bledri (died 1022) was Bishop of Llandaff from the late 10th century (probably 983 or 993) until his death in 1022. He is considered to have succeeded Bishop Marcluith and was succeeded by Bishop Joseph (d. 1064). His appointment is recorded in 'Liber Landavensis' (Book of Llandaff).

== Biography ==
Bishop Bledri's existence is only known from the 'Liber Landavensis', (also known as the Book of Llandaff, Llyfr Llandaf, Llyfr Llan Dâv, or Llyfr Teilo) the cartulary of the cathedral of Llandaff, a 12th-century compilation of documents recording the history of the diocese of Llandaff in South East Wales. The Book of Llandaff recorded that Bledri was chosen as Bishop of Llandaff in 983 by the sons of Morgan Hen ab Owain (d. 975), king of Morgannwg, and other princes, with the support of both the clergy and people of the diocese. This decision was then confirmed by King Ethelred and Archbishop Elfric of Canterbury.

During a conflict between Bledri’s men and troops working for King Edwin of Gwent (known in Welsh as Edwyn ap Gwriad), Bledri intervened and attempted to calm the situation down, but was wounded. He survived but as a result of the incident, King Edwin and his men were excommunicated by a synod of the church and his lands laid under an interdict. Eventually the two parties reached terms of agreement and a royal vill belonging to Edwin (thought today to have been Undy in Monmouthshire) was gifted to the See of Llandaff as means of apology.

== Legacy ==
Welsh antiquarian, collector of Medieval Welsh literature and forger Iolo Morganwg (1747–1826) gave Bishop Bledri a history of being a scholar with the title 'the Wise'. Morganwg credited Bledri with having set up schools in every parish of his diocese, which was repeated by later historians, but this is now considered to be one of his personal creations.
