= Tilgarsley =

Abandoned village in Oxfordshire

Coordinates: 51°47′57″N 1°24′12″W

Tilgarsley was a village in Oxfordshire, recorded as existing in 1279. It was abandoned before 1350, likely due to the Black Death. The site is believed to be located on what is now Bowles Farm, north west of Eynsham.
