= Theophilus Feild =

English bishop (died 1636)

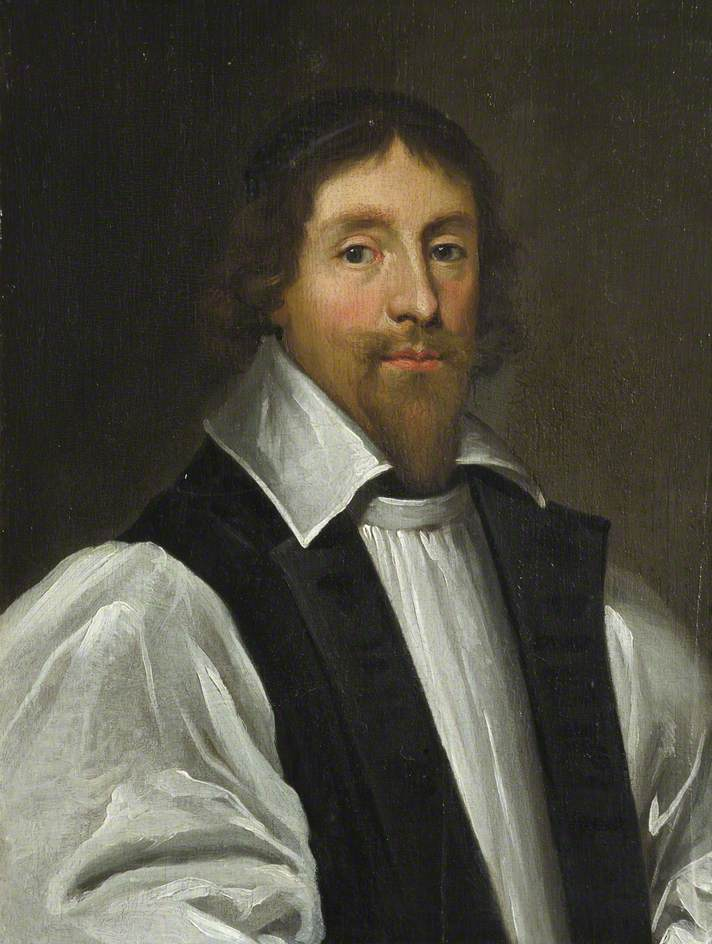
- Theophilus Feild
- Church: Church of England

Personal details
- Born: bap. 1575 Germany
- Died: 1636

Theophilus Feild or Field (bap. 1575, Cripplegate – 1636) was successively bishop of Llandaff (1619–1627), of St Davids (1627–1635) and of Hereford (1635–1636). He was born in Germany.

The son of notable preacher John Feild and father of Architect David Feild, he entered Emmanuel College, Cambridge as a sizar but received his B.A. from Pembroke College in 1595/6. He owed his earlier promotion to the Duke of Buckingham. The noted antiquary Sir John Stradling received his poetic endorsements for his works.

In 1598 he was briefly master of the school that is now Colchester Royal Grammar School.

Church of England titles
Preceded by George Carleton	Bishop of Llandaff; 1619–1627	Succeeded by William Murray
Preceded by William Laud	Bishop of St Davids; 1627–1635	Succeeded by Roger Maynwaring
Preceded by Matthew Wren	Bishop of Hereford; 1635–1636	Succeeded by George Coke
