= Anthony Kitchin =

English abbot and bishop (1477–1563)

- Bishop of Llandaff
- Church: Roman Catholic / Church of England
- See: Diocese of Llandaff
- In office: 1545–1563
- Predecessor: Robert Holgate
- Successor: Hugh Jones

Personal details
- Born: 1477
- Died: 31 October 1563 (aged 85–86) Mathern Palace, Mathern, Wales

Anthony Kitchin (1477 – 31 October 1563), also known earlier as Dunstan Kitchin, was a mid-16th-century Abbot of Eynsham Abbey and then, Bishop of Llandaff in the Catholic Church under Henry VIII and eventually under Mary I. He seems to have had no qualms about the breach with Rome under Henry VIII, the Protestant Reformation under Edward VI and though reconciled as a Catholic under Mary I, accepted to serve when Protestantism returned under Elizabeth I.

== Career ==
Kitchin was a monk under the monastic name Dunstan at Westminster Abbey, before becoming Prior of Gloucester Hall, Oxford. He was appointed Abbot of Eynsham in 1530, but lost the post at his abbey's dissolution in 1539, receiving an unusually large pension of £133-6s-8d pa. Six years later, in 1545, Kitchin was made Bishop of Llandaff. He was subsequently said to have impoverished the diocese by selling off much of its property.

He retained his see under Henry VIII, Edward VI, Mary I, and Elizabeth I. Alone of all the English bishops, he took the oath of Royal supremacy on the accession of the last named. His willingness to follow the opinion of whichever monarch reigned has led many to accuse Kitchin of being spineless. Indeed, one historian has written of Kitchin that he was a 'timeserver who would doubtless have become a Hindu if required, provided he was allowed to hold on to the See of Llandaff' (Eamon Duffy, 'Fires of Faith', p. 23). However, he showed some backbone in opposing Elizabeth's appointment of Matthew Parker to the See of Canterbury (cf. Nag's Head Fable); apparently, his acquiescence in religious matters had its limits.

Kitchin died at the Bishop's Palace in Mathern on 31 October 1563 at the age of 92 and was buried there. He was one of the last known people born in the reign of Edward IV.

Religious titles
| Preceded by Robert Holgate | Bishop of Llandaff; 1545–1566 | Succeeded by Hugh Jones |
