= Mollie Harris =

- Born: Mollie Woodley; 23 June 1913; Ducklington, Oxfordshire, England
- Died: 2 October 1995 (aged 82)
- Occupations: actress, author

Mollie Harris (born Mollie Woodley, 23 June 1913 – 2 October 1995) was an English actress and author, known for her appearances as village shopkeeper Martha Woodford in the BBC Radio soap opera The Archers.

== Life ==
Mollie Woodley was born in Ducklington, Oxfordshire and raised in that county. After World War II, she became a writer and broadcaster for BBC Radio, on programmes such as In The Country, with Phil Drabble. She joined The Archers in 1970. and appeared as a castaway on the BBC Radio programme Desert Island Discs on 8 October 1983.

Harris's books about her life in Oxfordshire, include her three-volume autobiography, A Kind of Magic (1969), Another Kind of Magic (1971) and The Green Years (1976). She wrote From Acre End (1982) about Eynsham, the village where she lived. Mollie Harris wrote the book "The Archers Country Cookbook", which did appear under the name of "Martha Woodford", and was for a while a country cook resident on BBC television programme Pebble Mill at One. She also wrote books about privies.

She married Ginger Harris, a heating engineer, in 1937 and adopted his surname. He died in 1982. Harris died on 2 October 1995 in Oxford.

The painter Gary Woodley, who illustrated some of her books, was her cousin.

== Bibliography ==
- —— (1969). A Kind of Magic. Chatto & Windus. ISBN 9780701114503.
- —— (1971). Another Kind of Magic.
- —— (1976). The Green Years.
- —— (1977). The Archer's Country Cookbook.
- —— (1982). From Acre End: a portrait of a village.
- —— (1984). Cotswold Privies.
- —— (1987). The Magic of the Cotswold Way. Chatto & Windus. ISBN 9780701131524.
- —— (1989). Where the Windrush Flows.
- —— (1990). Privies Galore.
- —— (1991). Wychwood: the secret Cotswold forest.
