= Gervase Babington =

English bishop (1549/1550–1610)

The Right Reverend Gervase Babington
- Bishop of Worcester
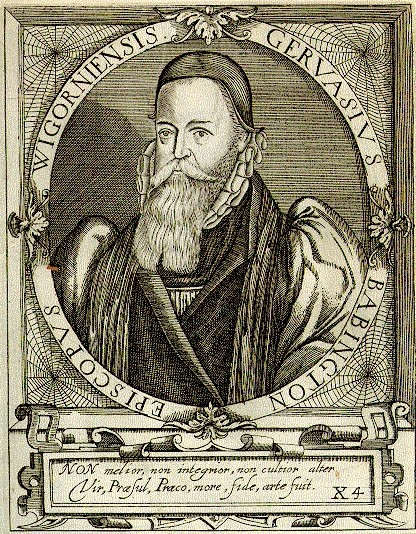
- Church: Church of England
- See: Diocese of Worcester
- In office: 1597–1610
- Predecessor: John Woolton
- Successor: William Cotton
- Previous posts: Bishop of Llandaff, Bishop of Exeter; Bishop

Personal details
- Born: 1549/1550
- Died: 1610

Gervase Babington (1549/1550–1610) was an English churchman, serving as the Bishop of Llandaff (1591–1594), Bishop of Exeter (1594–1597) and Bishop of Worcester in 1597–1610. He was a member of the Babington family and held influential offices at the same time as his cousin Anthony Babington was executed for treason against Elizabeth I as part of the Babington Plot.

== Life ==
He was from Nottinghamshire, and sent to Trinity College, Cambridge of which he became Fellow. He passed to Oxford University, where, on 15 July 1578, he was incorporated M.A. He returned to Cambridge, and was known as a 'hard student' of theology. He became associated with the household of Henry Herbert, 2nd Earl of Pembroke. By his patron's influence he was appointed treasurer of Llandaff, collated 28 January 1590; he had already obtained a prebend in Hereford Cathedral.

By the same patronage Babington was elected bishop of Llandaff 7 August 1591, confirmed on the 27th, and consecrated at Croydon Palace on the 29th. Four years later he was translated to the see of Exeter, elected 4 February 1595, and enthroned 22 March. He was criticised for having alienated from this bishopric the manor of Crediton. Finally, he was nominated by the queen to Worcester, on 30 August 1597, elected 15 September, and confirmed 4 October.

Among other subsidiary offices held by him was that of queen's counsel for the Marches of Wales. Early in 1600 Babington was believed to favour Robert Devereux, 2nd Earl of Essex; and it was said that Queen Elizabeth had called him to account while he was preaching a sermon before her, because of the hints he made on behalf of the Earl.

In 1604 Babington was summoned to the Hampton Court conference. He died 17 May 1610, and was buried in his cathedral.

== Works ==
In 1583 Babington issued his Very fruitful exposition of the commandements by way of questions and answers, which was republished in 1590, and again about 1600. A similar work on the Lord's Prayer was issued in 1588. In 1584 appeared his Briefe conference betwixt man's frailtie and faith wherein is declared the true use and comfort of those blessings pronounced by Christ in the fifth of Matthew ... . Laide downe in order of dialogue. This was republished in 1590 and again in 1596. In 1592 the first edition was published of Certaine, plaine, briefe, and comfortable notes upon everie chapter of Genesis, of which an enlarged edition appeared in 1596 and 1602. In 1604 he issued his Comfortable notes upon the bookes of Exodus and Leviticus. Several sermons preached at St Paul's Cross by Babington were also published.

The major folio of his works, edited by Miles Smith and T. C, issued originally in 1615, was republished in 1622 and 1637. It consists of Babington's Comfortable Notes upon the Five Books of Moses, also an exposition upon the Creed, the Commandments, the Lord's Prayer, with a conference betwixt man's frailtie and faith, and three sermons, etc. Some passages from Babington's treatise on the commandments, in which the vices of his age are attacked, were reprinted in the New Shakspere Society's edition of Phillip Stubbes's Anatomy of Abuses. A sermon preached by Babington in 1590, and published in his 'Works,' was reprinted by Sir Richard Hill as an appendix to his 'Apology for Brotherly Love,' in 1798.

== Bibliography ==
- 1583 - A very Fruitfull Exposition of the Commaundents by way of questions and answeres for greater plainnesse ...
- 1583 - A briefe conference betwixt mans frailtie and faith, ...
- 1588 - A profitable exposition of the Fords prayer, ...
- 1599 - A Sermon preached at Paules Grosse ...
- 1604 - Comfortable notes upon the bookes of Exodus and Leviticus, ...
- 1622 - The workes of the right reverend father in god Gervase Babington, late bishop of Worcester

== Arms ==
Coat of arms of Gervase Babington
Escutcheon Argent, ten torteaux in pile, a label (of five points gules.

== Notes and references ==
- Babington, Gervase (1615). The Workes of the Right Reverend Father in God Gervase Babington, Late Bishop of Worcester. Containing Comfortable Notes Upon the Five Bookes of Moses ...: A sermon preached at Paules Crosse, the second sunday in Michaelmas Tearme. 1590. By Gervase Babington ... London: George Eld.
- Macauley, John S. "Babington, Gervase". Oxford Dictionary of National Biography (online ed.). Oxford University Press. doi:10.1093/ref:odnb/973. (Subscription, Wikipedia Library access or UK public library membership required.)

Church of England titles
Preceded by William Blethyn	Bishop of Llandaff; 1591–1594	Succeeded by William Morgan
Preceded by John Woolton	Bishop of Exeter; 1594–1597	Succeeded by William Cotton
Preceded by Thomas Bilson	Bishop of Worcester; 1597–1610	Succeeded by Henry Parry
