= George de Athequa =

Spanish Bishop of Llandaff (died 1537)

- Bishop of Llandaff
- Church: Roman Catholic
- See: Diocese of Llandaff
- In office: 1517–1537
- Predecessor: Miles Salley
- Successor: Robert Holgate

Personal details
- Born: Spain
- Died: 1537

George de Athequa was a Bishop of Llandaff in the early days of the Reformation. A Spaniard by birth, he was chaplain to Queen Catharine of Aragon, with whom he left Spain for England. Acting as one of the inner circle of Queen Catherine, and one of her most constant companions up until the point of her death, Athequa was therefore largely non-resident in his diocese, which was overseen in his absence by a suffragan bishop, John Smart. At the passing of the 1534 Act of Supremacy, Athequa refused to take the resulting oath and attempted to flee the country. Preparing to board a Flemish ship in disguise, his true identity was revealed after his servant inadvertently gave him away by continuing to refer to him as "My Lord". The ambassador to Charles V, Eustace Chapuys, eventually secured his release from his incarceration in the Tower and arranged his passage back to Spain in 1537.

He alienated property from the see of Llandaff, notably the bishop's manor at Nash, which was leased in perpetuity to the Carnes family for the rental agreement of 30 shillings. He is thought to be one of the sources for the Spanish Chronicle.

Religious titles
| Preceded by Miles Salley | Bishop of Llandaff; 1517–1537 | Succeeded by Robert Holgate |
