= Roger Maynwaring =

Bishop of St Davids, censured by Parliament in 1628

The Most Reverend and Right Honourable Roger Maynwaring
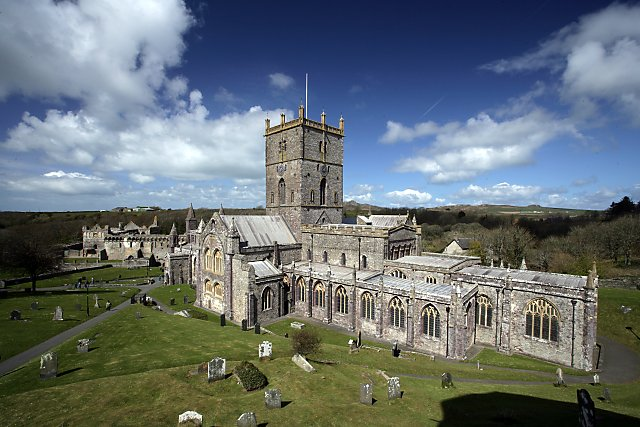
- St Davids Cathedral; Maynwaring served as bishop from 1636 to 1646
- Church: Church of England
- Diocese: St Davids
- In office: 1636–1646 (see abolished under the Commonwealth)
- Predecessor: Theophilus Feild
- Successor: William Lucy (1660)

Orders
- Ordination: 5 July 1611
- Consecration: 28 February 1636 by William Laud

Personal details
- Born: circa 1589/1590 Church Stretton, Shropshire, England
- Died: 29 June 1653 (aged 64) Brecon, Wales
- Education: King's School, Worcester
- Alma mater: All Souls College, Oxford

Roger Maynwaring (variously spelled Mainwaring or Manwaring; c. 1589/1590 – 29 June 1653) was an English bishop in the Church of England. He was censured by Parliament in 1628 for sermons perceived as undermining the law and constitution.

Although his exact motivations remain uncertain, Maynwaring was not associated with Arminianism, unlike his contemporary William Laud. Many of his contemporaries speculated that his actions were driven by ambition and a desire for advancement.

In 1636, he was appointed Bishop of St Davids. In 1641, the Long Parliament issued a warrant for his arrest, prompting him to flee to Ireland. He returned to England in July 1642, shortly before the outbreak of the First English Civil War. Deprived of his see, he retired to Brecon, Wales, where he died in June 1653.

== Biography ==
Roger Maynwaring was born in Church Stretton, Shropshire. His father, Thomas Maynwaring (born 1544), was the younger son of Sir Randall Maynwaring of Carincham in Cheshire.

Maynwaring was apparently married twice. While details of his first wife remain unknown, his will mentions three adult daughters, a son, and his second wife, Jane.

== Career ==
Educated at King's School, Worcester, Maynwaring attended All Souls College, Oxford in 1604, graduating in 1611. He was installed as curate at St Katharine Cree in London and later became the rector of St Giles in the Fields in 1616.

The 1620s were marked by ongoing conflict between the monarchy and Parliament. In June 1626, Charles I dissolved Parliament when it refused to fund the Spanish war and imposed "forced loans." Those who refused to pay were imprisoned without trial. When Chief Justice Sir Randolph Crewe ruled the practice illegal, he was dismissed, and over 70 individuals were jailed.

Appointed a royal chaplain in 1625, Maynwaring delivered two sermons before Charles I in July 1627, expanding on the principles of the divine right beyond those stated by James VI and I. While James acknowledged a king's obligation to consider the welfare of his subjects, Maynwaring argued that a king's interests outweighed those of "millions of subjects," whose sole duty was obedience. He asserted that Parliament existed only to comply with royal commands, whether in raising taxes or approving forced loans, and that refusal to do so risked damnation.

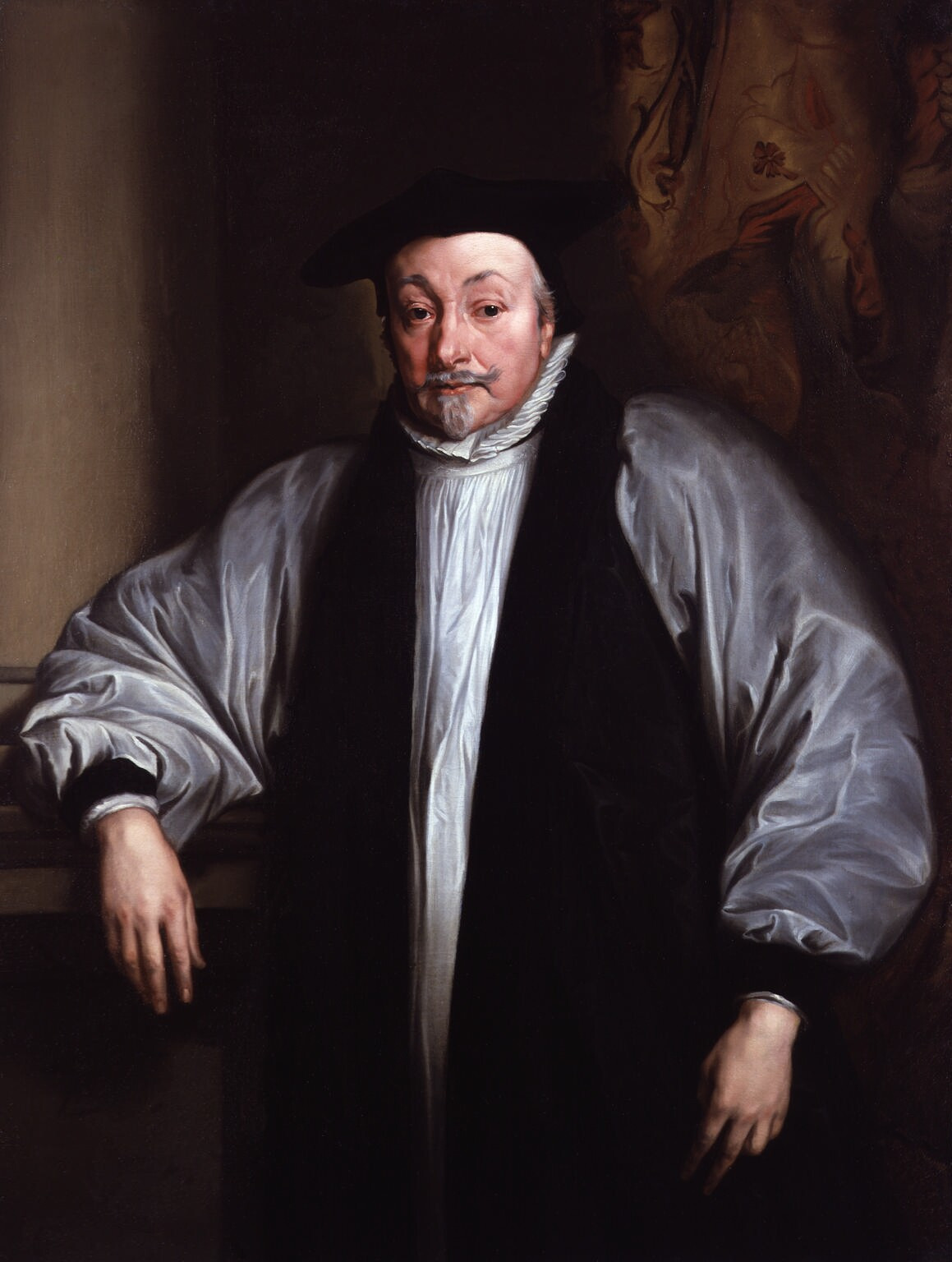
William Laud; Maynwaring's sermon was part of a campaign coordinated by Laud, emphasizing the obedience owed by subjects to their king.

Robert Sibthorpe, Isaac Bargrave, and Matthew Wren also delivered sermons promoting similar views as part of a campaign coordinated by William Laud (then Bishop of Bath and Wells) to align the Church of England with royal fiscal policies. As royal chaplains, they preached before Charles and the court, tailoring their messages to this audience.

The controversy arose from applying the general doctrine of divine right to specific policies, such as taxation. In the charged political climate, this stance was inflammatory. Maynwaring went further than his colleagues, claiming that disobedience to the king risked eternal damnation, provoking outrage among Calvinists like John Pym. (Note: A key Calvinist belief was predestination and salvation through faith alone.) His assertion that "kings were gods" was also seen as blasphemous.

Even Laud advised against publishing the sermon, warning that "many things therein... will be very distasteful to the people." When Charles insisted on its publication, Maynwaring’s superior, George Montaigne, Bishop of London, ensured that the title page read "At the Royal Command." Charles also sought to print Sibthorpe’s sermons, but George Abbot, the Archbishop of Canterbury, successfully opposed this.

In the 17th century, religion and politics were intertwined; "good government" was believed to require "true religion," meaning that changes in one sphere implied changes in the other. (Note: Summarized by John Hampden in the 1628 debate on the Petition of Right: "Here is 1, an innovation of religion suspected; is it not high time to take it to heart and acquaint his Majesty? 2ly, alteration of government; can you forbear when it goes no less than the subversion of the whole state? 3ly, hemmed in with enemies; is it now a time to be silent, and not to show to his Majesty that a man that has so much power uses none of it to help us? If he be no papist, papists are friends and kindred to him.") Maynwaring used theology to justify policies widely considered illegal, even by legal authorities such as Sir Edward Coke, a former Chief Justice and one of the most respected lawyers of the era.

The 1628 Parliament, which convened in March, established a religious committee that included Pym, Francis Rous, and John Hampden. While investigating controversial preachers, the committee was further provoked when Maynwaring repeated his message at St. Giles on 4 June. Many, including John Williams, Bishop of Lincoln, believed ambition, rather than principle, motivated Maynwaring. Nevertheless, the committee thoroughly refuted his arguments. Parliament impeached him for treason and blasphemy, resulting in his imprisonment, a fine, and suspension from ministry on 24 June.

Despite this, Charles pardoned Maynwaring on 6 July and appointed him to a new parish, Stanford Rivers. He continued to receive promotions, becoming Dean of Worcester in 1634 and bishop of St Davids in 1636. When Charles was forced to recall Parliament in 1640, Maynwaring’s case was revisited by Robert Devereux, 3rd Earl of Essex. The Worcester city council objected to various "Popish innovations" introduced during his tenure, which were added to the charges against him.

In August 1640, a warrant was issued for his arrest, prompting him to flee to Ireland. When he returned in June 1642, he was recognized in Minehead and brought before magistrates. After a brief imprisonment, he retired to Brecon, which remained a Royalist stronghold until the First English Civil War ended in 1646. On 9 October 1646, Parliament formally deprived him of his bishopric as episcopacy was abolished under the Commonwealth and the Protectorate.

Maynwaring appears to have been left undisturbed under the Commonwealth. He died in Brecon on 29 June 1653.

== Sources ==
- Adamson, John (2007). The Noble Revolt: The Overthrow of Charles I. Orion. ISBN 978-0297842620.
- Atkin, Malcolm (1995). The Civil War in Worcestershire. Sutton Publishing Ltd. ISBN 978-0750910507.
- Baker, John (2002). An Introduction to English Legal History. Butterworths. ISBN 978-0-406-93053-8.
- Barry, John M (2012). Roger Williams and the Creation of the American Soul: Church, State, and the Birth of Liberty. Viking Press. ISBN 978-0670023059.
- Cust, Richard (1987). The forced loan and English politics, 1626–1628. Clarendon Press. ISBN 978-0198229513.
- Hostettler, John (1997). Sir Edward Coke: A Force for Freedom. Barry Rose Law Publishers. ISBN 1-872328-67-9.
- Keeler, Mary Frear; Janssen Cole, Maija (1997). Proceedings in Parliament, 1628, Volume 4, (Yale Proceedings in Parliament). University of Rochester Press. ISBN 978-1580460095.
- Larminie, Vivienne (2008). "Maynwaring, Roger". Oxford Dictionary of National Biography (online ed.). Oxford University Press. doi:10.1093/ref:odnb/18011. (Subscription, Wikipedia Library access or UK public library membership required.)
- Maynwaring, Roger (1627). Religion and alegiance [sic] in two sermons preached before the Kings Maiestie, the one on the fourth of Iuly, anno 1627. at Oatlands, the other on the 29. of Iuly the same yeere, at Alderton.
- Perille, Laura (2012). "Harnessing Conscience for the King: Charles I, the Forced Loan Sermons, and Matters of Conscience". Exemplaria. 24 (1): 161–177. doi:10.1179/1041257311Z.0000000011. S2CID 143875777.
- Pyle, Andrew (2000). The Dictionary of Seventeenth-century British Philosophers, Volume I. Thoemmes Continuum. ISBN 978-1855067042.
- Snapp, Harry (1967). "The Impeachment of Roger Maynwaring". Huntington Library Quarterly. 30 (3): 217–232. doi:10.2307/3816610. JSTOR 3816610.
- Solt, Leo (1990). Church and State in Early Modern England, 1509-1640. OUP. ISBN 978-0195059793.

Church of England titles
Preceded by Theophilus Field	Bishop of St David's; 1635–1646	Succeeded by vacant to 1660; William Lucy
