= Eynsham Abbey =

(1005–1538) Benedictine monastery in Oxfordshire, England

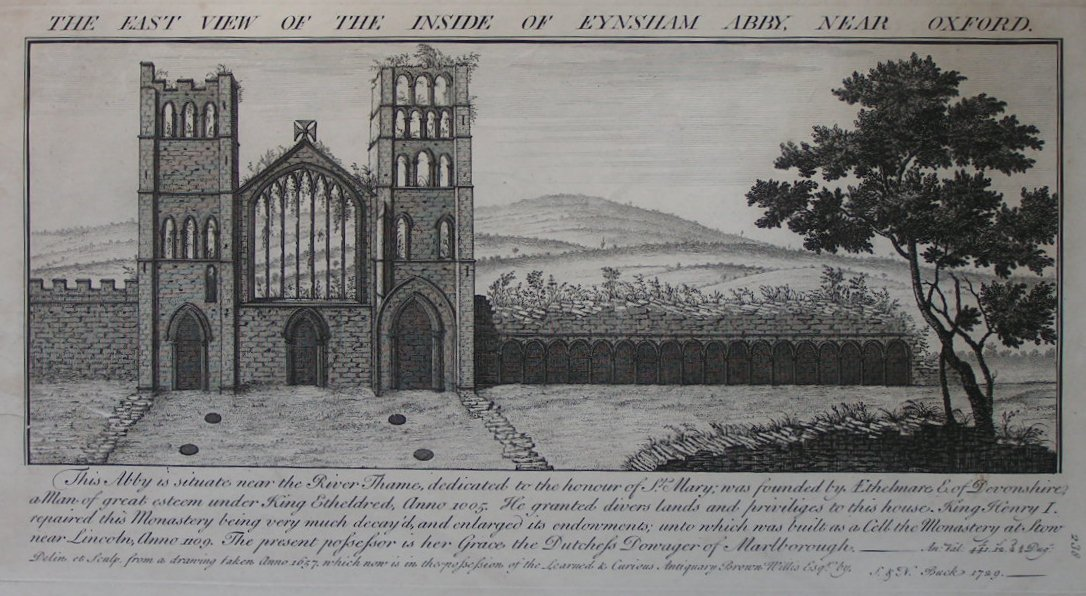
- The ruins of Eynsham Abbey in 1729
- Interactive map of Eynsham Abbey

Monastery information
- Order: Benedictine
- Established: 1005
- Disestablished: 1538
- Diocese: Diocese of Lincoln

People
- Founder: Æthelmar
- Important associated figures: Æthelred the Unready, Ælfric, Adam of Eynsham, Anthony Kitchin

Architecture
- Heritage designation: Scheduled monument

Site
- Location: Eynsham, Oxfordshire, England
- Coordinates: 51°46′43″N 1°22′26″W

Eynsham Abbey was a Benedictine monastery in Eynsham, Oxfordshire, in England between 1005 and 1538. King Æthelred allowed Æthelmær the Stout to found the abbey in 1005. There is some evidence that the abbey was built on the site of an earlier minster, probably founded in the 7th or 8th centuries. The site is a Scheduled Historic Monument.

== History ==
The first abbot of the abbey was the prolific writer Ælfric (c. 955–c. 1010) and the abbey was established in 1005.

Eynsham Abbey was in the Diocese of Dorchester. In 1072 the recently appointed Norman Bishop of Dorchester, Remigius, moved his see from Dorchester, a few miles down the Thames from Eynsham, to Lincoln, at the other end of the diocese. In 1091 Remigius annexed Eynsham Abbey, with its revenues, to his new abbey at Stow in Lincolnshire. This may have been the opening move in an attempt to introduce monks into the Lincoln cathedral chapter, but Remigius' successor, Robert Bloet, did not follow through with the scheme, if this was the intention, and the monks returned to Eynsham. A consequence of the return was that Eynsham Abbey was endowed by the bishop with additional lands in the south. After 1109, the old abbey was demolished, and in the 1200s, many new buildings were erected.

Carving of three heads from Eynsham Abbey in the collection of the Vale and Downland Museum (Wantage)

The abbey flourished in the Middle Ages, although there were probably never more than 25 to 30 monks. A well-known abbot was Adam of Eynsham, a writer, who wrote a hagiography of Saint Hugh of Lincoln. Records from 1390 indicate that the abbey's income was just over £772; funds were obtained from rents and the sale of wool and livestock. By 1406 the income was just over £812.

By the 16th century there seem to have been only a few monks left, and in 1538 the abbey was closed in the Dissolution of the Monasteries. Anthony Kitchin was the last abbot. Some of the buildings were wrecked to hinder the return of the monks. Some of the monks found work with the Protestant church and the abbot, Anthony Kitchin (1471–1563), was named Bishop of Llandaff in the Church of England, in 1545.

The abbey estates were awarded to Sir George Darcy. As of 1657 the site included two ruined high towers and part of a wall. The Earl of Derby later acquired the precinct; stones from the buildings were subsequently used to build houses in the village.

Excavations by the Oxford Archaeological Unit were conducted from 1989 to 1992; according to one report, "many items of interest were found including the bones of a number of people". Some of the artefacts found at the site are housed in the Oxfordshire County Council Museums Resource Centre, Standlake.

== Burials ==
- Robert D'Oyly (Osney)
- Anchetil de Greye and wife Matilda de Redvers
- Fulk De Oyly

== Bibliography ==
- Barclay, A; Boyle, A; Keevil, GD (2001). "A Prehistoric Enclosure at Eynsham Abbey, Oxfordshire" (PDF). Oxoniensia. LXVI. Oxfordshire Architectural and Historical Society. ISSN 0308-5562.
- Blair, John (1994). Anglo Saxon Oxfordshire. Stroud: Alan Sutton. p. 63. ISBN 0-7509-0147-0.
- Burton, Janet (1994). Monastic and Religious Orders in Britain: 1000–1300. Cambridge Medieval Textbooks. Cambridge: Cambridge University Press. p. 230. ISBN 0-521-37797-8.
- Gordon, Eric (1990). Eynsham Abbey. Phillimore. ISBN 0-85033-747-X.
- Gray, Margaret; Clayton, Nicholas (1978). "Excavations on the site of Eynsham Abbey, 1971" (PDF). Oxoniensia. XLIII. Oxfordshire Architectural and Historical Society. ISSN 0308-5562.
- Hardy, Alan; Dodd, Anne; Keevil, GD (2002). Aelfric's Abbey: Excavations at Eynsham Abbey, Oxfordshire, 1989–92. Thames Valley Landscape Series. Vol. 16. Oxford: Oxford University School of Archaeology. ISBN 0-947816-91-7.
- Knowles, David (1976). The Monastic Order in England: A History of its Development from the Times of St. Dunstan to the Fourth Lateran Council, 940–1216 (Second reprint ed.). Cambridge: Cambridge University Press. p. 132. ISBN 0-521-05479-6.
- Page, William, ed. (1907). "The abbey of Eynsham". A History of the County of Oxford. Victoria County History. Vol. 2: Ecclesiastical History, Religious Houses, Social and Economic History, Industries, Agriculture, Forestry, Ancient Earthworks, Sport. Westminster: Archibald Constable & Co. pp. 65–67.
- Smith, David M; London, Vera CM (2001). The Heads of Religious Houses, England and Wales. Vol. II. 1216–1377. Cambridge: Cambridge University Press. p. 43. ISBN 0-521-80271-7.
- Thomas, Lawrence (1959). "KITCHIN, ANTHONY (alias Dunstan before his consecration), 1477–1563; bishop of Llandaff, 1545–63". Dictionary of Welsh Biography. National Library of Wales.
