= William Blethyn =

Bishop of Llandaff, Wales

- Bishop of Llandaff
- William Blethyn (right) and Hugh Jones
- Church: Church of England
- See: Diocese of Llandaff
- In office: 1575–1591
- Predecessor: Hugh Jones
- Successor: Gervase Babington

Orders
- Consecration: 17 April 1575 by Matthew Parker

Personal details
- Died: 1591

William Blethyn was a prebendary of York and a bishop of Llandaff. He died in 1591.

== Life ==
Blethyn was reputed to have been born at Shirenewton Hall, a large country house at Shirenewton in Monmouthshire, although his descendants were also said to have resided at Dinham, in a mansion on the site later occupied by Great Dinham Farm.

He was educated at Oxford, at either New Inn Hall or Broadgates Hall. He took orders and became archdeacon of Brecon in 1567 and also bishop of Llandaff in 1575, holding several livings at the same time in order to boost the scanty endowments of the see. Blethyn made efforts to maintain the fabric of his cathedral.

He died in October 1590, at Shirenewton Hall, leaving three sons, and was buried in the church of Mathern.

Church of England titles
Preceded by Hugh Jones	Bishop of Llandaff; 1575–1591	Succeeded by Gervase Babington
