= Barnard Gate =

Hamlet in Oxfordshire, England

Coordinates: 51.793°N 01.416°W

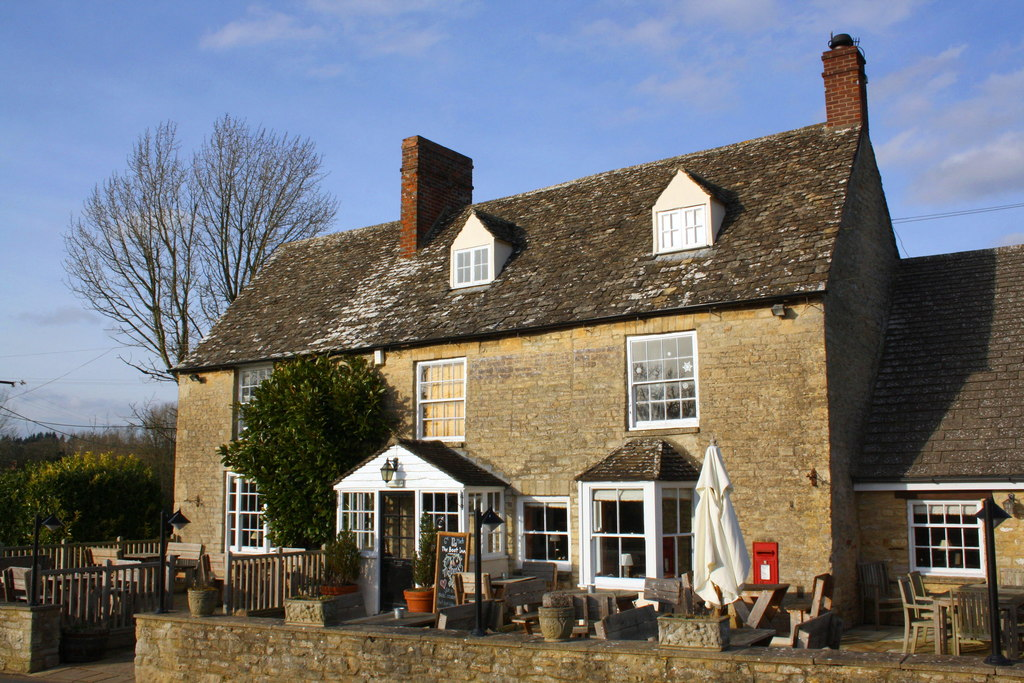
- The Boot Inn

- Location within Oxfordshire
- OS grid reference: SP4010
- Civil parish: Eynsham
- District: West Oxfordshire
- Shire county: Oxfordshire
- Region: South East
- Country: England
- Sovereign state: United Kingdom
- Post town: Witney
- Postcode district: OX29
- Dialling code: 01865
- Police: Thames Valley
- Fire: Oxfordshire
- Ambulance: South Central
- UK Parliament: Witney

Barnard Gate is a hamlet in the civil parish of Eynsham, in the West Oxfordshire district, in Oxfordshire, England, about 3 miles (4.8 km) east of Witney. It has a public house, the Boot Inn.
