= William Lucy =

English clergyman

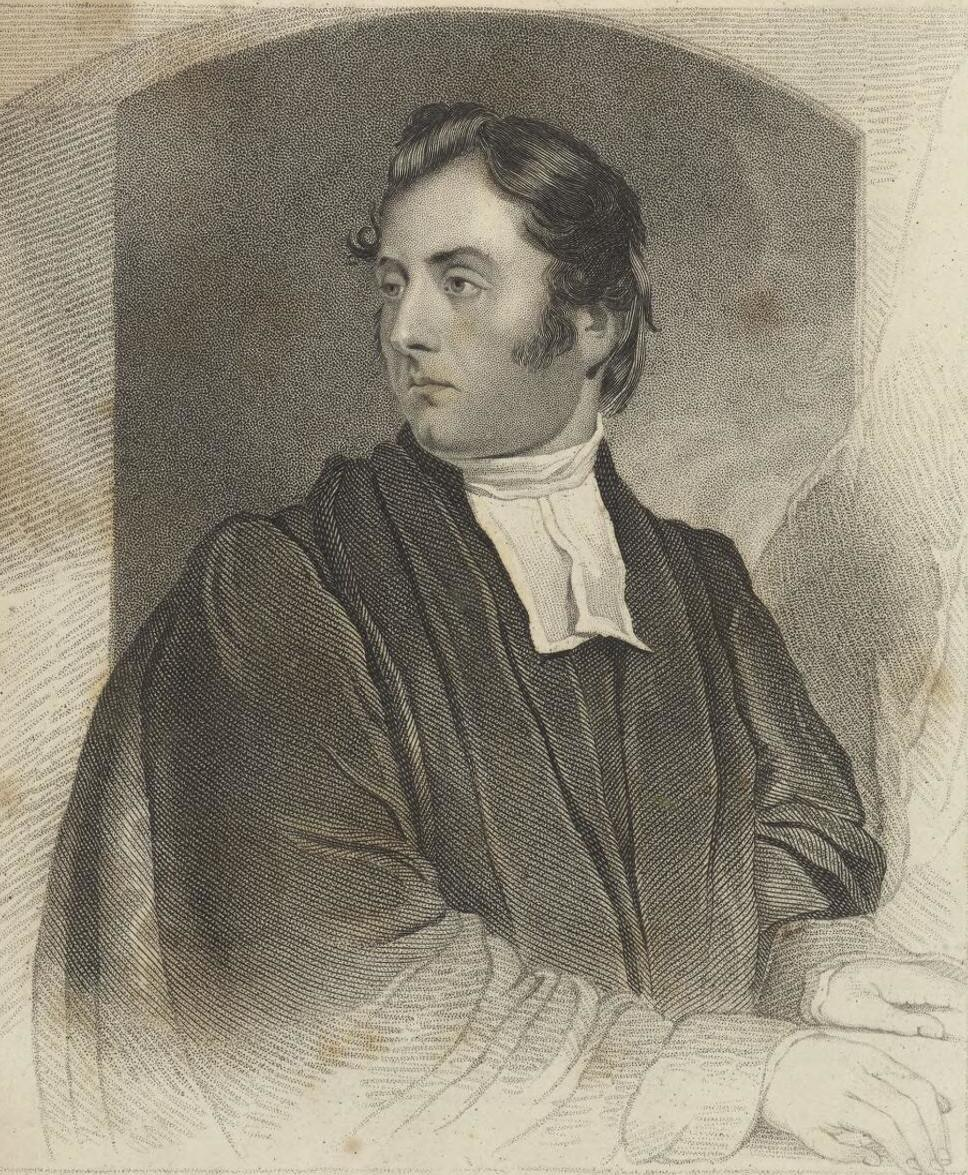
William Lucy from an 1827 engraving

William Lucy (1594–1677) was an English clergyman. He was Bishop of St David's after the English Restoration of 1660.

== Life ==
Lucy was a student at Trinity College, Oxford. He belonged to the Arminian party, and became Rector of Burghclere in 1619, Highclere in 1621.

He became Bishop of St Davids upon the Restoration in 1660 — he was elected to the See on 11 October 1660, confirmed 17 November, and consecrated a bishop on 2 December 1660.

In the mid-1660s, Lucy clashed with William Nicholson, Bishop of Gloucester, over Nicholson's visiting rights as Archdeacon of Brecon. Lucy won the resulting court case.

William Lucy's tomb and wall monument are at Christ College, Brecon. The tomb is by William Stanton. He rebuilt the church there, demolished in the Civil War period.

== Opponent of Hobbes ==
In 1657, William Lucy published an attack on the philosophy of Thomas Hobbes, and in particular on Leviathan (1651), using the pseudonym William Pyke, Christophilus, and circulated by Humphrey Robinson. A later and expanded edition, of 1663, was under his real name, as Observations, Censures and Confutations of Notorious Errours in Mr. Hobbes his Leviathan.

John Bowle considers Lucy's views as representative of the common view. He attacked Hobbes's concept of the state of nature, as inconsistent with the Biblical state. The popularity of the ideas he conceded, but he attributed it to neophilia. His attack has been called traditionalist and moralistic.

== Notes and references ==
Church of England titles
Preceded by Roger Mainwaring, vacant after 1653	Bishop of St David's; 1660–1677	Succeeded by William Thomas
