= Robert Holgate =

Archbishop of York from 1545 to 1554

The Most Reverend Robert Holgate
- Archbishop of York
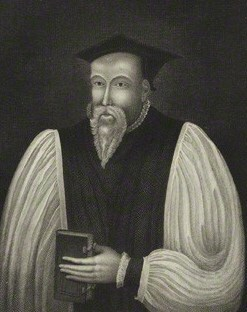
- Installed: 1545
- Term ended: 1554
- Predecessor: Edward Lee
- Successor: Nicholas Heath

Personal details
- Born: 1481/1482
- Died: 1555

Robert Holgate (1481/1482-1555) was Bishop of Llandaff from 1537 and then Archbishop of York (from 1545 to 1554). He recognised Henry VIII as head of the Church of England.

Holgate was a canon of the Gilbertine Order, and was probably educated at the Gilbertine house (St Edmund's Priory) at Cambridge. He was university preacher at Cambridge in 1524, and was created a D.D. in 1537.

Although a protege of Thomas Cromwell, 1st Earl of Essex, Holgate had a distinguished monastic career. He was Prior of St. Catherine's Priory, Lincoln, Master of the Gilbertine Order, and also briefly Prior of Watton Priory until its dissolution in 1539. Most of the Gilbertine houses were lesser establishments which should have been dissolved under the Suppression of Religious Houses Act 1535 (only four out of twenty-six houses had revenues over £200 a year). However, Holgate is credited with using his influence to save them for a few years. For example, Malton Priory, one of the lesser Gilbertine houses, was the last of them to surrender in December 1539, whereas Sempringham Priory, worth more than £200 a year, surrendered in 1538.

Holgate was consecrated as Bishop of Llandaff on 25 March 1537. He translated to York on 16 January 1545. In 1546 he founded two schools, at York a grammar school now called Archbishop Holgate's School and in Hemsworth a grammar school later known as Holgate School.

He was President of the Council of the North from 1538.

In 1550 Holgate, aged 68, married Barbara Wentworth, who was about 25 at the time. This might, however have been a second wedding to make it fully legal, and Holgate and Wentworth might have first married in late 1547 with Roger Tongue officiating. In 1551 Anthony Norman claimed that he was already married to Barbara Wentworth, but the courts decided that their marriage when she was about seven had not been a binding legal transaction. Robert and Barbara remained married until 1553, when shortly after Mary I came to the throne. She imprisoned Holgate on various charges, with his being a married cleric being central to these. In 1554 Holgate renounced his marriage claiming he had only entered it to avoid suspicion as a Catholic. In January 1555 Holgate was released from prison, but he was not restored to priestly office. He died later that year.

In 1558 a Robert Holgate from Yorkshire entered Christ's College, Cambridge. He may have been a son of Holgate, since there are some claims he had two children by Barbara, but there is no conclusive evidence on the matter.

== Arms ==
Coat of arms of Robert Holgate

Notes
While serving as a bishop Holgate's arms would be displayed impaled with the arms of the diocese and topped by a mitre.
Escutcheon
Or a bend between two bulls’ heads couped Sable on a chief Argent two bars Gules surmounted of a crutch staff in bend, Azure.

Church of England titles
Preceded by George de Athequa	Bishop of Llandaff; 1537–1545	Succeeded by Anthony Kitchin
Preceded by Edward Lee	Archbishop of York; 1545–1554	Succeeded by Nicholas Heath
Preceded by	Master of the Gilbertine Order –1539	Vacant Dissolution of the Lesser Monasteries Act Title next held by None
