= William Murray (bishop) =

Anglican bishop (17th century)

William Murray was an Anglican bishop in the first half of the Seventeenth century.

Formerly Chaplain-in-Ordinary to King James I & VI he was nominated Bishop of Kilfenora on 15 March 1622 and consecrated on 18 December that year. He was translated to Llandaff on 24 December 1627.

== See also ==
Church of Ireland titles
Preceded by John Steere	Bishop of Kilfenora; 1622–1627	Succeeded by Interregnum
Church of England titles
Preceded by Theophilus Feild	Bishop of Llandaff; 1627–1639	Succeeded by Morgan Owen
