= David Wilbourne =

British Anglican bishop

The Right Reverend David Wilbourne
- Assistant Bishop of Llandaff
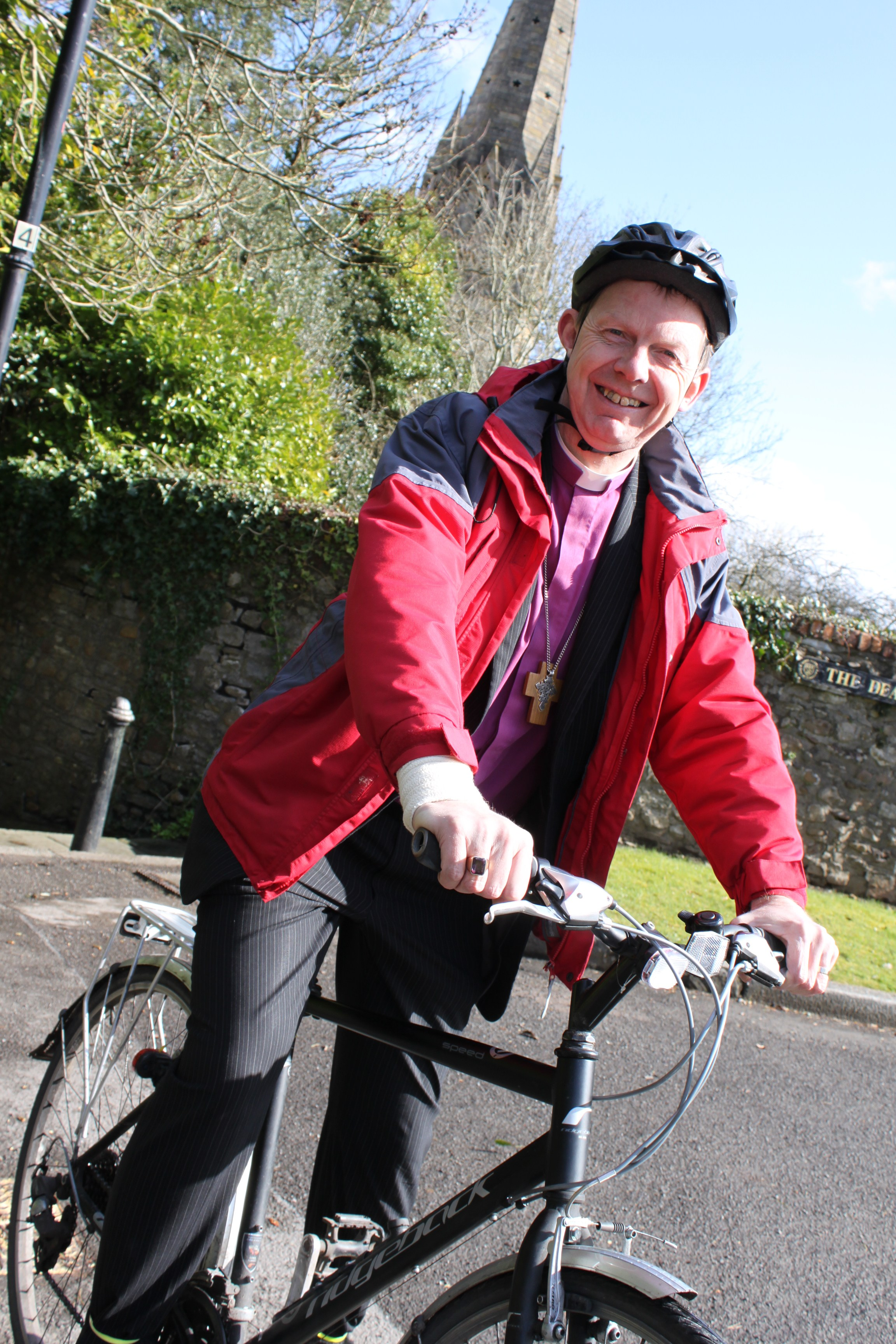
- Church: Church in Wales
- Diocese: Diocese of Llandaff
- In office: 2009 to 2017

Orders
- Ordination: 1981 (deacon); 1982 (priest)
- Consecration: 4 April 2009

Personal details
- Born: David Wilbourne; 1955 (age 70–71)
- Denomination: Anglican
- Education: Jesus College, Cambridge; Westcott House, Cambridge

David Jeffrey Wilbourne (born 15 September 1955) is an Anglican bishop. The son of a priest, he has spent the majority of his ministry in Yorkshire. He was the Assistant Bishop of Llandaff from 2009 until 2017, working alongside the Archbishop of Wales in Cardiff and surrounding areas.

== Early life and education ==
David Wilbourne was born in 1955 in Derbyshire, schooled in Yorkshire, studied Natural Sciences and Theology at Jesus College, Cambridge and trained for ordination at Westcott House, Cambridge. Prior to ordination, David worked for Barclays Bank in central Hull for six years and taught Greek and New Testament Studies as a University Supervisor.

== Ordained ministry ==
He returned to Yorkshire as a priest, ministering first in urban Middlesbrough, then at Monk Fryston and South Milford (in Selby District Council, North Yorkshire.) He then moved on to be the Archbishop of York's chaplain, working with John Habgood for four years prior to his retirement and then continuing to work with his successor, David Hope. He was also Director of Ordinands, selecting women and men for the ordained ministry and taking them through training to their first post. In September 1997 he moved from Bishopthorpe to be Vicar of Helmsley, a moorland market town in North Yorkshire, which has now become a minister church serving eight other churches. Archbishop John Sentamu collated him as a non-residentiary canon of York Minister in 2008. During his time in Helmsley, he was also Chair of Governors of both Helmsley Primary School and Ryedale Comprehensive School, and a consultant to Archbishop Sentamu.

- Curate of Stainton-in-Cleveland (1981-1985)
- Rector of Monk Fryston and South Milford (1985-1991)
- Chaplain to Archbishop of York and Director of Ordinands (1991-1997)
- Vicar of Helmsley (1997–2009)
- Canon and Prebendary York Minster (2008-2009)

=== Episcopal ministry ===
On 4 April 2009 he was consecrated a bishop at Llandaff Cathedral, by Barry Morgan, Archbishop of Wales and Bishop of Llandaff. As Assistant Bishop of Llandaff, he worked with Morgan to serve the diocese which runs from Cardiff to the outskirts of Swansea and from the Vale of Glamorgan to the Heads of the Valleys. In 2010, 2011 and 2013 he led a fifteen-part Lent course across the diocese including teaching and questions. He has also acted as Continuing Ministerial Development Officer, Initial Ministerial Education Officer and Director of Ordinands over a 30-month period. In 2012 he called on each of the Diocese's 225 serving clergy with the gift of a Lent book, making 70 of the calls on his bicycle.

In March 2017, it was announced that he would be stepping down as Assistant Bishop of Llandaff. He did so on 16 April 2017. In November 2017, he was appointed an Honorary Assistant Bishop to serve in the Diocese of York.

== Publications ==
Archbishop’s Diary (SPCK 1995)

A Vicar’s Diary (HarperCollins 1998 and 1999)

A Virgin’s Diary (SPCK 1999)

A Summer’s Diary (Harper Collins 2001, Zondervan 2002) Sequel to A Vicar’s Diary

You were made for me (SPCK 2001)

Church Times Diary column 1996 – 2008

The Tablet (12 July 2008) "Radicals, Reaction and Evolution"

The Spectator (Christmas 2008) "God rest ye merry capitalists"

Church Times Reviewer 1998 – present.

Helmsley Chronicles (DLT 2012)

Christmas Message 2012

Expecting Christ (York Courses 2013)

Jesus: the voice that makes us turn (York Courses 2014)

Shepherd of Another Flock (Pan Macmillan 2017)
