= Jimmy Montgomerie =

Scottish-Canadian soccer player

Personal information
- Full name: James Baird Thorneycroft Montgomerie
- Date of birth: July 20, 1894
- Place of birth: Darvel, Scotland
- Date of death: March 22, 1987 (aged 92)
- Place of death: Eynsham, England
- Position: Centre back

Senior career*
Years	Team	Apps	(Gls)
- Montreal Highlanders
–1924	Canadian Grenadier Guards		
1924–1931	New Bedford Whalers	280	(40)
1931	Fall River	6	(2)
1931	New Bedford Whalers	19	(0)
- * Club domestic league appearances and goals

James Baird Montgomerie MC & Bar MM (20 July 1894 – 22 March 1987) was a Scottish-Canadian soccer centre half back who played in Canada and the United States. He was a veteran of World War I, serving in the Canadian Army and winning the Military Cross with bar.

Born in Scotland, Montgomerie was playing in Montreal by 1915 when he was part of the Montreal All Star team which lost to the Toronto All Stars during their annual inter-city clash. At that time, he played for Highlanders. When World War I began, Montgomerie entered the Canadian Army and was assigned to the 42nd Battalion. During that war, he served as a lieutenant and won the Military Medal and the Military Cross with bar. After the war, he returned to Canada. In 1922, he played for Montreal's Canadian Grenadier Guards when they won the Quebec Cup. In 1924, Montgomerie moved south to join the New Bedford Whalers of the American Soccer League. He remained with the Whalers until the fall of 1931, aside from six games with the Fall River in the spring of 1931.
