= Hugh Jones (footballer) =

Welsh footballer

Personal information
- Date of birth: 1876
- Place of birth: Wales
- Position: Defender

Senior career*
Years	Team	Apps	(Gls)
-1901	Aberdare		
1901-1902	Aberaman		
1902	Manchester City		
1904	Riverside		

International career
1902	Wales	1	(0)
- * Club domestic league appearances and goals

Hugh Jones (born 1876) was a Welsh international footballer. He was part of the Wales national football team, playing 1 match on 22 February 1902 against Ireland.

At club level he played for Aberdare and Aberaman. In March 1902, a transfer was agreed between Aberaman and Man City. By 1904, he was reported to be playing for Riverside AFC.

== See also ==
- List of Wales international footballers (alphabetical)
