= Hugh Jones (cricketer) =

English cricketer

Personal information
- Born: 1889; Gloucestershire
- Died: 10 November 1918 (aged 28–29); Chatham, Kent
- Batting: Right-handed

Domestic team information
- Years: Team
- 1914: Gloucestershire
- Source: Cricinfo, 29 March 2014

Hugh Jones (1889 – 10 November 1918) was an English cricketer. He played for Gloucestershire in 1914.
