= Hugh Jones (weightlifter) =

New Zealand weightlifter (1930–1965)

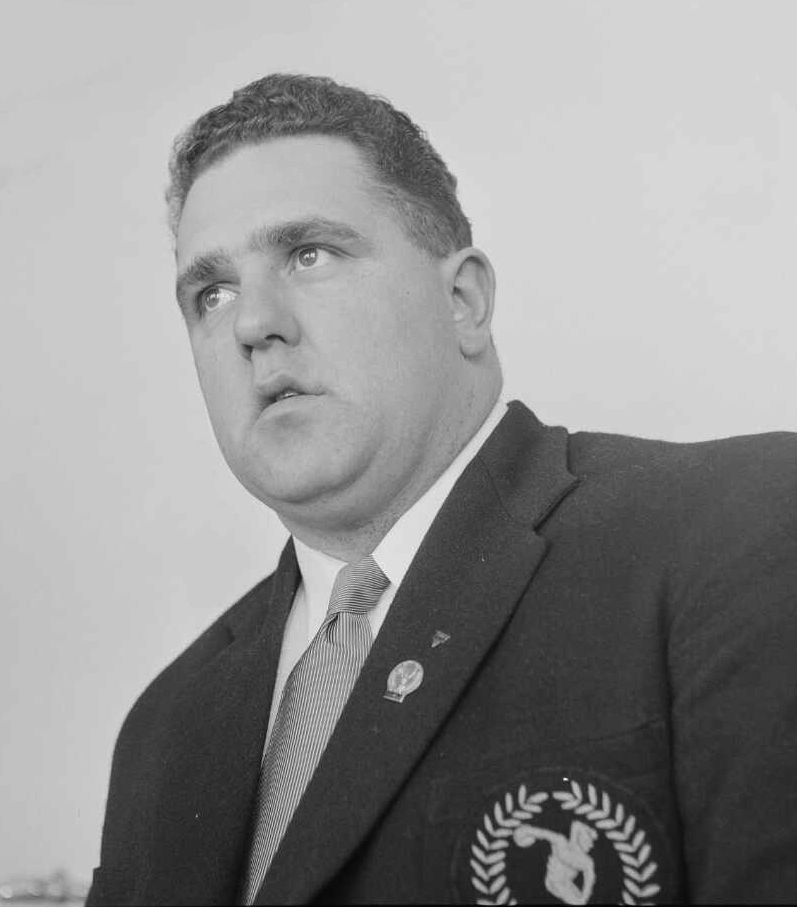
- Jones in 1956

Personal information
- Born: 10 August 1930 Auckland, New Zealand
- Died: 23 July 1965 (aged 34)
- Weight: 121 kg (267 lb)

Sport
- Country: New Zealand
- Sport: Weightlifting

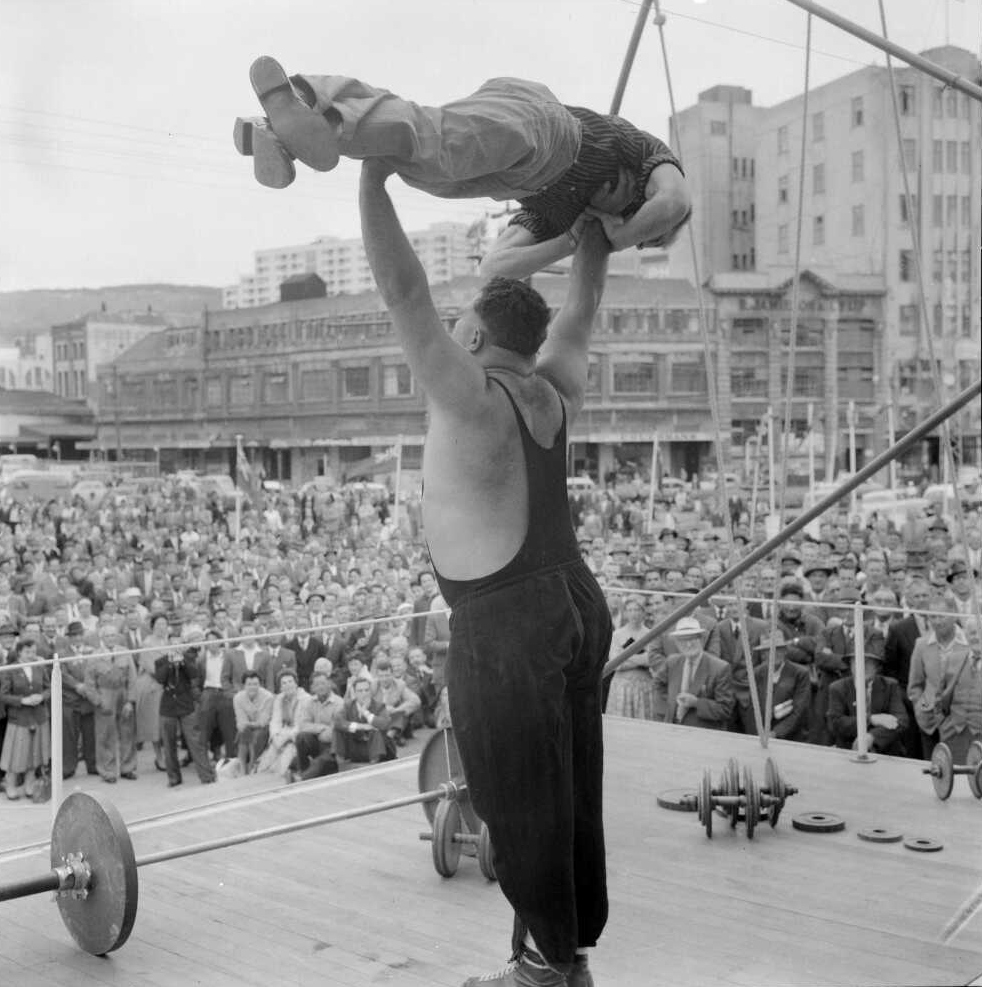
Jones lifting a man at a public event in Wellington in 1959

Richard Hugh Jones (10 August 1930 – 23 July 1965) was a New Zealand heavyweight weightlifter. He placed eighth at the 1956 Summer Olympics.
