= Hugh Johnys =

Sir Hugh Johnys (c. 1410 – in or after 1485), knighted at the Holy Sepulchre in Jerusalem after fighting under John, Emperor of Constantinople, was a Knight Marshal of England and France. In later life he was involved in the upbringing of Henry Tudor, later Henry VII.

== Life ==
Johnys was descended from a cadet branch of the Vaughans of Bredwardine in Herefordshire. Hugh Jones, Bishop of Llandaff, is said to have been descended from the same Gower family as Hugh Johnys.

A memorial brass in St Mary's Church, Swansea, erected to the memory of Johnys and his wife Maud, records that he fought under John, Emperor of Constantinople, for five years against the Turks and Saracens "in the p[ar]tis of troy grecie and turky", and was knighted at the Holy Sepulchre in Jerusalem on 14 August 1441. The brass records that afterwards he was Knight Marshal of France for five years under John, Duke of Somerset, and became at a later date Knight Marshal of England under John, Duke of Norfolk, who gave Johnys the Manor of Landimore in Gower.

After the Duke of Norfolk's death in 1461, William Herbert, 1st Earl of Pembroke took over as custodian of Gower, and it is thought that Johnys during the 1460s was involved in the upbringing of Lord Herbert's ward Henry Tudor, later Henry VII.

Johnys's first wife Mary is mentioned in 1451; her parents and date of death are unknown. He married Maud, heiress of Rees Cradock, probably about 1455. He and his wife were living in 1463, when they were granted a tenement in Fisher Street, Swansea. They had five children.

In December 1468, Edward IV appointed Johnys as one of the Poor Knights of Windsor; it is supposed that Maud had died by this time. He then resided mainly in Windsor until the early 1480s, when he returned to Gower. He died in or after 1485.

== Arms ==
Coat of arms of Sir Hugh Johnys
Escutcheon Quarterly: 1 & 4, Sable a fess argent between three boys' heads couped at the neck, a snake about each one's neck. 2, Sable, a chevron between three spear-heads argent embrued gules. 3, Gules, a chevron argent between three chess-rooks sable. Other versions An alternative coat of arms identified as belonging to Sir Hugh is Argent, a fess between three cocks armed, crested and jelloped gules.

== See also ==
- Roger Vaughan of Bredwardine
