= Bishop of Llandaff =

Ordinary of the Church in Wales Diocese of Llandaff

- Bishopric

anglican
- Coat of arms
- Incumbent; Mary Stallard

Location
- Ecclesiastical province: Wales

Information
- Diocese: Llandaff
- Cathedral: Llandaff Cathedral

The Bishop of Llandaff is the ordinary of the Church in Wales Diocese of Llandaff.

== Area of authority ==
The diocese covers most of the County of Glamorgan. The bishop's seat is in the Cathedral Church of Saint Peter and Saint Paul (the site of a church traditionally said to have been founded in 560 by Saint Teilo), in the village of Llandaff, just north-west of the City of Cardiff. The bishop's residence is Llys Esgob, The Cathedral Green, Llandaff, in Cardiff.

== Brief history ==
The controversial Iolo Manuscripts claim an older foundation dating to Saints Dyfan and Fagan, said elsewhere to have missionized the court of King Lucius of Britain on behalf of Pope Eleutherius around AD 166. The manuscripts—others of which are original and others now known forgeries—list Dyfan as the first bishop and, following his martyrdom, Fagan as his successor. Baring-Gould refers to them as chorepiscopi. The present-day St Fagans (referenced in the manuscripts as "Llanffagan Fawr") is now a village near Cardiff.

Originally Celtic Christians, the bishops were in full communion with the Roman Catholic Church from 777 until the Reformation. In AD 914, the Danes ravaged Archenfield, according to the Anglo-Saxon Chronicle (AD 915, Worcester Manuscript, p. 99). The jarls leading the raids, Ohtor and Hroald, captured the bishop; he was later ransomed. The jarls were killed in a subsequent battle at "Killdane Field" (or "Kill Dane") in Weston-under-Penyard and the raiders were subdued.

The first evidence that the bishops were called Bishop of Llandaff is from the early 11th century. Before this, though still ministering to Glamorgan and Gwent, the bishops described themselves as Bishop of Teilo and were almost certainly based at Llandeilo Abbey. The very early bishops were probably based in Ergyng. Before 1107, the title Bishop of Gwlad Morgan (Glamorgan) had been adopted. It was not until the title Bishop of Llandaff was used by Bishop Urban from c. 1119. In medieval records, the bishop was sometimes referred to as the Archbishop of Llandaff. This appears to have been a simple reaction to the claim of St David's to the archiepiscopal title.

In 1534, the church in England and Wales broke allegiance with the Roman Catholic Church and established the Church of England. After a brief restoration with the Holy See during the reign of Queen Mary I, the Welsh dioceses remained part of the Anglican Province of Canterbury from the reign of Queen Elizabeth I until the early 20th century. Following the passing of the Welsh Church Act 1914, the church in Wales and Monmouthshire was disestablished and the independent Church in Wales was created on 31 March 1920. The bishopric and diocese of Llandaff now constitute part of the Church in Wales within the wider Anglican Communion.

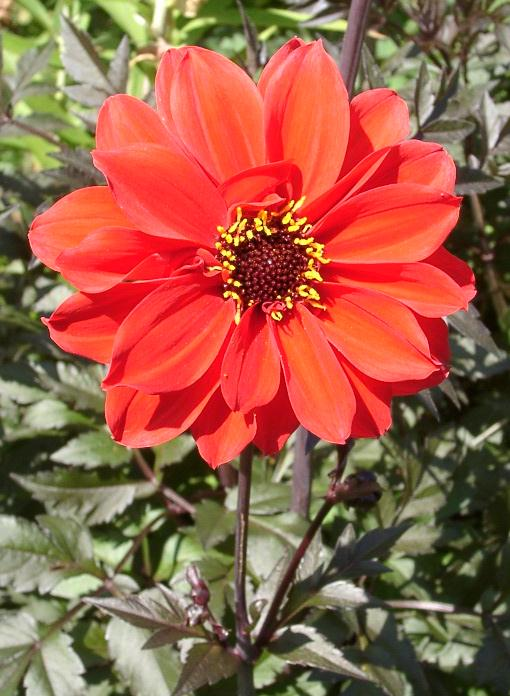
Joshua Pritchard Hughes had a Dahlia Dahlia 'Bishop of Llandaff' named for him in 1924

In 1924, the Dahlia 'Bishop of Llandaff' was named after Joshua Pritchard Hughes, who was bishop from 1905 to 1931.

A long-serving recent bishop of Llandaff was Barry Morgan; when elected as bishop in 1999 his official signature was Barry Landav, but once elected Archbishop of Wales in 2003 his archiepiscopal signature Barry Cambrensis took precedence. He was supported by David Wilbourne, assistant bishop of Llandaff from 2009 to 2017.

Following June Osborne's retirement, on 19 January 2023, it was announced that Mary Stallard, Assistant Bishop of Bangor, had been elected that day by the Electoral College of the Church in Wales at Llandaff Cathedral to become the next diocesan Bishop of Llandaff. She legally took up her See as of the Sacred Synod to confirm her election; which occurred on 19 April 2023 at Holy Trinity, Llandudno.

== List of bishops ==
(Dates in italics indicate de facto continuation of office.)

=== Pre-Reformation ===
==== Diocese of 'Glamorgan and Gwent' – Traditional list ====
Bishops of 'Glamorgan and Gwent'
From	Until	Incumbent	Notes
522	c. 546	Dubricius	Bishop of Ergyng
c. 546	c. 560	Saint Teilo	Bishop of Teilo
c. 560	c. 615	Oudoceus	Bishop of Teilo (Llandaf)
???	???	Ubylwinus	7th-century bishop, probably of Ergyng
???	???	Aedanus	7th century bishop, probably of Ergyng
???	???	Elgistil	7th century bishop, probably of Ergyng
???	???	Iunapeius	7th century bishop, probably of Ergyng
???	???	Comergius	7th century bishop, probably of Ergyng
???	???	Arwistil	7th century bishop, probably of Ergyng
???	???	Gurvan	8th century bishop, probably of Gwent.
???	???	Guodloiu	9th century bishop, probably of Gwent.
???	???	Edilbinus	9th century bishop, probably of Gwent.
???	???	Grecielis	9th century bishop, probably of Gwent.
c. 700	???	Berthwyn	Bishop of Teilo; succeeded Oudoceus according to the Llandaff Charters
???	???	Tyrchanus	
???	???	Elvogus	Probably a mistake: Elfoddw, Bishop of Bangor
???	???	Catguaret	
???	???	Cerenhir	
???	874	Nobis	Bishop of Teilo; probably the same as the Bishop of St David's
874	???	Nudd	
880s	927?	Cyfeilliog	Perhaps Bishop of Ergyng
927?	929	Libiau	
???	???	Wulfrith	
???	???	Pater	
972	982	Gucan	
982	993	Marcluith	
993	1022	Bledri	
1022	c. 1045	Joseph	Died in Rome circa 1045.
c. 1045	c. 1056/59	See vacant	
c. 1056/59	1104	Herewald	Consecrated on 26 May 1056 or 23 May 1059. Suspended by Anselm of Canterbury soon after December 1093. Uncertain if reinstated, but died on 6 March 1104.
1104	1107	See vacant	

==== Diocese of Llandaff ====
Bishops of Llandaff
From	Until	Incumbent	Notes
1107	1134	Urban	Formerly Archdeacon of Llandaff. Consecrated on 11 August 1107. Died in office on or before 9 October 1134.
1134	1140	See vacant	
1140	1148	Uhtred	Also known as Uchtryd. Formerly Archdeacon of Llandaff. Consecrated in late January 1140. Died in office, probably in early 1148.
1148	1183	Nicholas ap Gwrgant	Formerly a monk of Gloucester Abbey. Consecrated on 14 March 1148. Participated in the coronation of Henry the Young King on 14 June 1170. Suspended by Richard of Dover, archbishop of Canterbury in 1174 for blessing Robert, abbot of Malmesbury against the wishes of Josceline de Bohon, bishop of Salisbury. Died in office on 3 June or 4 July 1183.
1186	1191	William de Saltmarsh	Formerly Prior of St Augustine's, Bristol. Elected on 3 December 1184 and consecrated on 10 August 1186. Died in office.
1191	1193	See vacant	
1193	1218	Henry de Abergavenny	Formerly Prior of Abergavenny. Consecrated on 12 December 1193. Created the cathedral chapter of Llandaff c. 1213. Died in office on 8 or 12 November 1218.
1219	1229	William de Goldcliff	Formerly Prior of Goldcliff. Elected before 11 July 1219, received royal assent and the temporalities on 16 July 1219, and consecrated on 27 October 1219. Died in office on 28 January 1229.
1230	1240	Elias de Radnor	Formerly Treasurer of Hereford. Received royal assent and the temporalities on 30 August 1230, and consecrated on 1 December 1230. Died in office on 7 or 13 May 1240.
1240	1240	Maurice (bishop-elect)	Archdeacon of Llandaff (1217–1242). Elected by the cathedral chapter, probably 1240, but royal assent was refused. Died on 14 December 1242.
1240	1244	William de Christchurch (bishop-elect)	Elected on 13 May 1240, but royal assent was refused. Apparently he was not consecrated and resigned before June 1244.
1245	1253	William de Burgh	Formerly a Canon of Llandaff, keeper of the king's Privy Seal, and controller of the Wardrobe. Elected sometime between 10 and 17 July 1244, received royal assent and the temporalities on 17 July 1244, and consecrated on 19 February 1245. Lost his sight c. 1246. Died in office on 11 June 1253.
1254	1256	John de la Ware	Formerly Abbot of Margam. Elected sometime between 13 June–24 July 1253, received royal assent on 26 July 1253 and the temporalities on 12 August 1253, consecrated on 11 January 1254, and enthroned on 15 February 1254. Died in office on 29 or 30 June 1256.
1257	1266	William de Radnor	Formerly Treasurer of Llandaff. Elected 28 July 1256, received royal assent on 26 July 1253 and the temporalities on 14 September 1256, and consecrated on 7 January 1257. Died in office on 9 January 1266.
1266	1287	William de Braose	Formerly Canon of Llandaff. Elected c. 7 March 1266, received royal assent on 28 March 1266 and the temporalities on 14 April 1266, and consecrated on 23 May 1266. Died in office on 18 or 19 March 1287.
1287	1290	Philip de Staunton (bishop-elect)	Precentor of Wells and a Canon of Llandaff. Elected by some canons of Llandaff before 10 July 1287, but was opposed other canons and the chancellor of Llandaff. His opponents appealed to the pope, and the election was quashed on 16 September 1290.
1290	1296	William Houghton (bishop-elect)	Also known as William de Hotham. Dominican friar. Papal provision on 4 September 1290 and occurs as bishop-elect on 16 September 1290, but was unwilling to accept bishopric. Papal mandate ordering his obedience on 26 April 1291. Subsequently, became Archbishop of Dublin in 1296.
1297	1323	John de Monmouth	Formerly Chancellor of Oxford University and a canon of Lincoln. Papal provision on 2 October 1294, appointed by Archbishop Robert Winchelsey of Canterbury on 14 October 1294, received possession of the temporalities on 4 April 1295, and consecrated on 10 February 1297. Died in office on 8 April 1323.
1323	1323	Alexander de Monmouth (bishop-elect)	Elected on 25 June 1323, royal assent sought on 7 July 1323 and granted on 15 July 1323, but set aside on hearing of the papal provision of Egglescliffe.
1323	1347	John de Egglescliffe	Translated from Connor, Ireland. Papal provision on 20 June 1323 and received possession of the temporalities on 13 August 1324. Died in office on 2 January 1347.
1347	1347	John of Coventry (bishop-elect)	Elected by the cathedral chapter of Llandaff, received royal assent to the election on 16 March 1347, but set aside on hearing of the papal provision of Paschal.
1347	1361	John Paschal	Consecrated on 16 February 1344 in the lifetime of Bishop Egglescliffe. Papal provision on 19 February 1347 and received possession of the temporalities between 2–7 July 1347. Died in office on 11 October 1361.
1361	1382	Rodger Cradock	Translated from Waterford & Lismore on 15 December 1361. Died in office before 22 June 1382.
1383	1385	Thomas Rushhook	Confessor to Richard II. Papal provision on 14 or 15 January 1383, received possession of the temporalities on 2 April 1383, and consecrated on 3 May 1383. Translated to Chichester on 16 October 1385.
1385	1389	William Bottlesham	Translated from the Titular see of Bethlehem. Papal provision on 16 October/2 December 1385 and received possession of the temporalities on 21 August 1386. Translated to Rochester on 27 August 1389.
1390	1393	Edmund Bromfeld	Papal provision on 9 August 1389, received possession of the temporalities on 17 December 1389, and consecrated on 20 January 1390. Died in office on 11 June 1393.
1394	1395	Robert Tideman of Winchcombe	Formerly Abbot of Beaulieu (1392–93). Papal provision on 13 October 1393, received royal assent on 18 August 1393 and the temporalities sometime between 3 July and 24 October 1394. Translated to Worcester before 13 June 1395.
1395	1396	Andrew Barret	Papal provision on 14 June 1395, received possession of the temporalities on 25 August 1395, and consecrated in 1395. Died in office before 12 April 1396.
1396	1398	John Burghill	Confessor to Richard II. Papal provision on 12 April 1396 and consecrated after 10 July 1396. Translated to Coventy & Lichfield on 2 July 1398.
1398	1407	Thomas Peverel	Translated from Ossory, Ireland on 12 July 1398 and received possession of the temporalities on 16 November 1398. Translated to Worcester on 4 July 1407.
1408	1423	John de la Zouche	Elected before 13 or 30 November 1407, received possession of the temporalities on 7 June 1408, and consecrated on 12 August 1408. Died in office in April 1423.
1423	1425	John Fulford (bishop-elect)	Elected by the cathedral chapter, sought royal assent on 6 May 1423, but the election set aside on hearing of the papal provision of Wells.
1425	1440	John Wells	Papal provision on 9 July 1425 and consecrated in 1425. Died in office before 17 November 1440.
1440	1440	Reginald Boulers (bishop-designate)	Abbot of Gloucester (1437–50). Nominated by King Henry VI on 21 November 1440, but Boulers refused the bishopric. Later he became Bishop of Hereford (1450–53) and then Bishop of Coventry & Lichfield (1453–59).
1441	1458	Nicholas Ashby	Formerly Prior of Westminster. Nominated on 25 December 1440, papal provision on 17 February 1441, and consecrated on 21 May 1441. Died in office before 19 June 1458.
1458	1476	John Hunden	Formerly Prior of King's Langley. Papal provision on 19 June 1458 and received possession of the temporalities on 25 August 1458. Resigned before 18 March 1476. Afterwards Archdeacon of St David's (1476-1482).
1476	1478	John Smith	Formerly Archdeacon of St David's. Papal provision circa 30 March 1476, consecrated in July 1476, and received possession of the temporalities on 11 September 1476. Died in office on 29 January 1478.
1478	1496	John Marshall	Papal provision on 18 May 1478, consecrated on 6 September 1478, and received possession of the temporalities sometime between 18 September–18 December 1478. Died in office sometime between 3 January–23 February 1496.
1496	1499	John Ingleby	Formerly Prior of Sheen. Papal provision on 27 June 1496, received possession of the temporalities on 2 September 1496, and consecrated after 6 September 1496. Died in office before 14 November 1499.
1500	1516/17	Miles Salley	Consecrated on 26 April 1500 and received possession of the temporalities on 12 May 1500. Also Abbot of Eynsham. Died in office sometime between 29 November 1516 and January 1517.

=== During the Reformation ===
Bishops of Llandaff
From	Until	Incumbent	Notes
1517	1537	George de Athequa	Chaplain to Queen Catherine (with whom he left Spain for England). Papal provision on 11 February 1517 and consecrated on 8 March 1517. Resigned in February 1537.
1537	1545	Robert Holgate	Elected on 8 March 1537, royal assent on 19 March 1537, and consecrated on 25 March 1537. Also briefly Prior of Watton until the priory was dissolved in 1539. Translated to York on 16 January 1545.
1545	1563	Anthony Kitchin	Previously Abbot of Eynsham (1530–1539). Consecrated on 3 May 1545. Died in office on 1563.

=== Post-Reformation ===
==== Bishops of the Church of England ====
Bishops of Llandaff
From	Until	Incumbent	Notes
1563	1567	See vacant	
1567	1574	Hugh Jones	Consecrated on 5 May 1567. Died in office circa 12 November 1574.
1575	1590	William Blethyn	Formerly a Prebendary of York. Consecrated on 17 April 1575. Died in office on 15 October 1590.
1591	1595	Gervase Babington	Formerly a Prebendary of Hereford. Consecrated on 29 August 1591. Translated to Exeter on 11 March 1595.
1595	1601	William Morgan	Consecrated on 20 July 1595. Translated to St Asaph on 17 September 1601.
1601	1617	Francis Godwin	Formerly a Canon of Wells. Consecrated on 22 November 1601. Translated to Hereford on 28 November 1617.
1618	1619	George Carleton	Also known as George Charlton. Consecrated on 12 July 1618. Translated to Chichester on 20 September 1619.
1619	1627	Theophilus Feild	Formerly Rector of Cotton, Suffolk. Consecrated on 10 October 1619. Translated to St David's on 12 July 1627.
1627	1640	William Murray	Translated from Kilfenora, Ireland on 24 December 1627. Died in office in February 1640.
1640	1645	Morgan Owen	Consecrated on 29 March 1640. Died in office on 4 March 1645.
1645	1646	See vacant	
1646	1660	The see was abolished during the Commonwealth and the Protectorate.	
1660	1667	Hugh Lloyd	Consecrated on 2 December 1660. Also Archdeacon of St David's (1644–1667). Held both posts until his death on 7 June 1667.
1667	1675	Francis Davies	Formerly Archdeacon of Llandaff (1660–1667). Consecrated on 24 August 1667. Died in office on 14 March 1675.
1675	1679	William Lloyd	Formerly a Prebendary of St Paul's, London. Consecrated on 18 April 1675. Translated to Peterborough on 16 May 1679.
1679	1706	William Beaw	Formerly Vicar of Adderbury, Oxfordshire. Consecrated on 22 June 1679. Died in office on 10 February 1706.
1706	1724	John Tyler	Formerly Dean of Hereford (1692–1706). Consecrated on 30 June 1706. Died in office on 6 July 1724.
1725	1729	Robert Clavering	Formerly a Canon of Christ Church, Oxford. Nominated on 14 September 1724 and consecrated on 2 January 1725. Translated to Peterborough on 17 February 1729.
1729	1738	John Harris	Formerly a Prebendary of Canterbury. Nominated on 19 September 1729 and consecrated on 19 October 1729. Died in office on 28 August 1738.
1739	1740	Matthias Mawson	Formerly Rector of Hadstock, Essex. Nominated on 17 January 1739 and consecrated on 18 February 1739. Translated to Chichester on 21 October 1740.
1740	1748	John Gilbert	Formerly Dean of Exeter (1726–1740). Nominated on 31 October 1740 and consecrated on 28 December 1740. Translated to Salisbury on 29 December 1748 then to York on 24 May 1757.
1749	1755	Edward Cresset	Formerly Dean of Hereford (1736–1748). Nominated on 7 January 1749 and consecrated on 12 February 1749. Died in office on 13 February 1755.
1755	1761	Richard Newcome	Formerly Canon of the Fourth Stall, Windsor (1749-1755). Nominated on 20 March 1755 and consecrated on 13 April 1755. Translated to St Asaph on 9 July 1761.
1761	1769	John Ewer	Nominated on 6 August 1761 and consecrated on 28 December 1761. Also Canon of the Sixth Stall, Windsor (1738–1774). Translated to Bangor on 10 January 1769.
1769		Jonathan Shipley	Formerly Dean of Winchester (1760–1769). Nominated on 19 January 1769 and consecrated on 12 February 1769. Translated to St Asaph on 8 September 1769.
1769	1782	Shute Barrington	Formerly a Canon of St Paul's, London. Nominated on 13 September 1769 and consecrated on 1 October 1769. Translated to Salisbury on 27 August 1782 and then to Durham on 7 July 1791.
1782	1816	Richard Watson	Nominated on 30 August 1782 and consecrated on 20 October 1782. Also Archdeacon of Ely (1779–1816) and Regius Professor of Divinity at Cambridge University (1771). Died in office on 4 July 1816.
1816	1819	Herbert Marsh	Nominated on 5 August 1816 and consecrated on 25 August 1816. Translated to Peterborough on 28 April 1819.
1819	1826	William Van Mildert	Nominated on 5 May 1819 and consecrated on 31 May 1819. Translated to Durham on 24 April 1826.
1826	1827	Charles Sumner	Nominated on 25 April 1826 and consecrated on 21 May 1826. Translated to Winchester on 12 December 1827.
1828	1849	Edward Copleston	Nominated on 18 December 1827 and consecrated on 13 January 1828. Died in office on 14 October 1849.
1849	1882	Alfred Ollivant	Formerly Regius Professor of Divinity at Cambridge University (1843) and a Canon of St David's. Nominated on 9 November 1849 and consecrated on 2 December 1849. Died in office on 16 December 1882.
1883	1905	Richard Lewis	Consecrated on 25 April 1883. Died in office on 24 January 1905.
1905	1920	Joshua Pritchard Hughes	Consecrated on 1 June 1905.

==== Bishops of the disestablished Church in Wales ====
Bishops of Llandaff
From	Until	Incumbent	Notes
1920	1931	Joshua Pritchard Hughes	The Church in Wales was disestablished in 1920. Retired on 24 February 1931 and died on 9 April 1938.
1931	1939	Timothy Rees MC CR	Consecrated on 25 April 1931. Died in office on 29 April 1939.
1939	1957	John Morgan	Translated from Swansea & Brecon. Elected on 22 June 1939 and confirmed on 27 September 1939. Also elected and confirmed Archbishop of Wales in 1949. Held both posts until his death on 26 June 1957.
1957	1970	Glyn Simon	Translated from Swansea & Brecon. Elected on 30 July 1957 and confirmed on 25 September 1957. Also elected Archbishop of Wales on 22 May 1968 and confirmed on 13 June 1968. Retired from both posts on 30 June 1970 and died on 14 June 1972.
1970	1975	Eryl Thomas	Translated from Monmouth. Elected on 4 October 1971 and confirmed on 7 December 1971. Retired on 9 November 1975 and died in 2001.
1975	1985	John Poole-Hughes	Formerly Bishop of South-West Tanganyika (1962-1974) and an Assistant Bishop of Llandaff. Elected on 9 December 1975 and confirmed on 23 January 1976. Retired in 1985 and died on 25 October 1988.
1985	1999	Roy Davies	Elected and confirmed in 1985. Retired in 1999 and died on 7 August 2013.
1999	2017	Barry Morgan	Translated from Bangor. Elected and confirmed in 1999. Also was elected Archbishop of Wales in 2002. Retired 31 January 2017.
2017	2022	June Osborne	Elected and confirmed in 2017. Retired 31 December 2022.
2023	present	Mary Stallard	Confirmed 19 April 2023.

== Assistant bishops ==
Among those non-retired bishops who have assisted the bishops of Llandaff have been:

- 1537 – 1561 (d.): Lewis Thomas, first Bishop suffragan of Shrewsbury, probably assisted the Bishop of Llandaff
- 2 June 1917 – 30 April 1921 (ret.): Lloyd Crossley, Rector of St Andrew's Major and former bishop of Auckland
- 1961 – 1970 (ret.): Thomas Hughes, Archdeacon of Margam (until 1965), then Archdeacon of Llandaff (until 1969)
- 1975 – 1976 (res.): John Poole Hughes, Curate at Llantwit Major and previously Bishop of South-West Tanganyika; became diocesan bishop of Llandaff
- 1977 – 1983 (ret.): David Reece, Archdeacon of Margam (until 1981)
- 2004 – 2009 (ret.): David Yeoman, Archdeacon of Morgannwg (until 2006)
- 2009 – 2017 (ret.): David Wilbourne
