= Adam of Eynsham =

12th and 13th-century English abbot and writer

- Abbot of Eynsham Abbey
- Installed: 1214
- Term ended: June 1228
- Predecessor: Robert
- Successor: Nicholas
- Other post: Prior of Eynsham

Orders
- Rank: Abbot

Personal details
- Born: Adam c. 1155 Oxford
- Died: after 1233
- Parents: Edmund
- Occupation: Monk and writer

Adam of Eynsham (died after 1233) was a medieval English chronicler and writer. He was a monk and Abbot of Eynsham Abbey.

Adam was born around 1155 in Oxford to a middle-class family. His father, a doctor in Oxford, was named Edmund. Edmund's other children included William and Edmund.

Adam entered Eynsham Abbey and was later appointed as prior before 1197. In that year a dispute arose between Hugh of Lincoln, the Bishop of Lincoln, who held the right of patronage over Eynsham, and King Richard I of England, over rights to the abbey. Adam appears as the presumed compiler of the Eynsham cartulary drawn up at that point for the bishop's use in this argument. Hugh then named Adam his chaplain, and he became Hugh's constant companion until the bishop died in 1200. This experience led Adam to write Magna Vita Sancti Hugonis or The Life of St Hugh of Lincoln. This work became Adam's claim to fame, and is one of the more trustworthy and fullest of the hagiographies existing from the Middle Ages.

Adam went to France while England was under an interdict during the later part of King John's reign, but when the interdict was lifted, Hugh's successor at Lincoln, Hugh of Wells, named Adam the Abbot of Eynsham in 1213. Adam was deposed by Hugh of Wells for being a "manifest dilapidator" of the monastery's property, on 1 June 1228 but is still referred to as abbot on 10 June. Eynsham had fallen into debt, and even though it had repaid the debts, the bishop still deposed Adam.

After his deposition from office, Adam retired to Little Rollright in Oxfordshire, and in 1233 he was allowed an exemption from having to do suit for the manor he was residing on. Presumably, he died soon after this occurrence.

The Vita of Hugh was written at the request of two monks of Winchester and was completed about 1212. It effectively supplanted all earlier works about Hugh, and although reliable for events during Hugh's adult life, has some errors in the sections dealing with Hugh's early life. The monastic historian David Knowles calls the work a "clear and living picture of the great bishop". Another work by Adam was a description of a vision that his brother Edmund saw in 1196, titled The Vision of the Monk of Eynsham, which survives in a few manuscripts.
