= Hugh Jones (bishop) =

Bishop of Llandaff (1508–1574)

Hugh Jones (left) and William Blethyn

Hugh Jones (1508–1574) was the bishop of Llandaff.

== Life ==
Jones was descended from a family of that name from Gower, to which also belonged Sir Hugh Johnys of Llandimore. He was educated at Oxford University, probably at New Inn Hall, and was admitted to the degree of Bachelor of Civil Law on 24 July 1541, being then described as ‘chaplain.’ He was first beneficed in Wales, but on 4 January 1557 he was instituted to the vicarage of Banwell, Somerset. By 1560 he had returned to Wales, and at that date was prebendary of Llandaff and rector of Tredunnock in the same diocese.

On 17 April 1567 he was, on Archbishop Parker's recommendation, elected bishop of Llandaff. The see was greatly impoverished, and Jones was, as Godwin has observed, the first Welshman that was preferred to it for the space of three hundred years. He died at Mathern, Monmouthshire in November 1574, and was buried on the 15th of the same month within the church there. He married Anne Henson, by whom he had several daughters.
