= List of alumni of Magdalene College, Cambridge =

This is a list of alumni of Magdalene College, Cambridge.

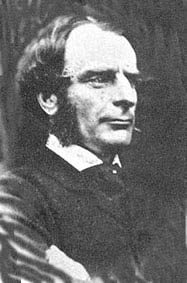
Charles Kingsley

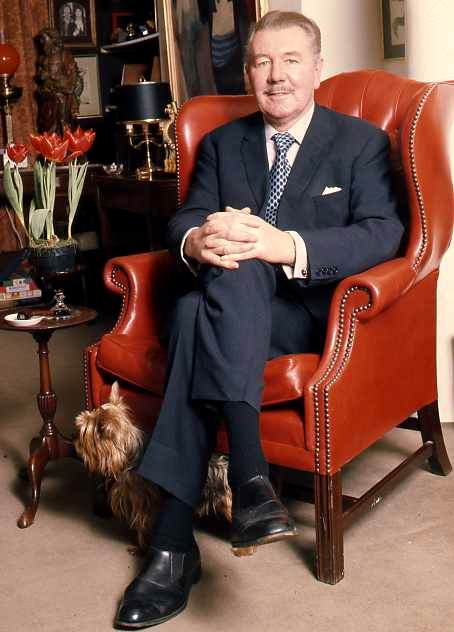
Michael Redgrave

- M. H. Abrams – literary theorist and critic
- J. R. Ackerley – writer and poet
- Michael Adeane, Baron Adeane – Private Secretary to Queen Elizabeth II
- Simon Ambrose – winner of The Apprentice (Season 3)
- Arthur Annesley, 5th Earl of Anglesey – Tory politician
- Le'ul Ras Asfa-Wossen Asserate – Ethiopian political analyst and consultant
- Richard Atkinson – Bishop of Bedford
- Sir Frank Baddeley – British colonial administrator
- Giles Baring – cricketer
- Simon Barrington-Ward – Bishop of Coventry (1985–1997)
- Lieutenant Colonel Charles Beauclerk, 13th Duke of St Albans – British Army officer
- Peter Beck – soldier and schoolmaster
- Edward Behr – journalist
- Henry Bellingham, Baron Bellingham – Member of Parliament for North West Norfolk; former junior minister at the Foreign and Commonwealth Office
- Peter Bennett-Jones – TV producer
- A. C. Benson – librettist of Land of Hope and Glory
- Michael Binyon – foreign correspondent for The Times; now Leader Writer
- Sir Michael Birt KC – barrister, 88th Bailiff of Jersey
- Patrick Blackett – Nobel Prize-winning physicist
- Sir Nicholas Blake – Judge of the High Court of Justice
- Norman Blake – Middle English and Early Modern English language and literature scholar
- Sir John Boardman – archaeologist, Professor of Classical Art and Archaeology
- Victor Bonham-Carter – author and publisher
- Desmond Bristow – intelligence officer
- John Bromley – 17th-century Catholic convert and translator of The Catechism for the Curats, composed by the Decree of the Council of Trent, faithfully translated into English (London 1687)
- Charles Vyner Brooke – last White Rajah of Sarawak
- John Browett – businessman
- Sir Simon Bryan – Judge of the High Court of Justice
- Anthony Bull – transport engineer
- Mike Bullen – TV screenwriter
- David Burghley – gold medalist of the 1928 Olympic Games in 400m hurdles
- Clemency Burton-Hill – broadcaster, novelist, journalist, and violinist
- Anthony Caesar – English priest and composer
- Sir David Calcutt – former Master and barrister
- Serban Cantacuzino – Romanian architect
- Lieutenant Colonel Reginald Capell, 9th Earl of Essex – British Army officer
- William Cash – journalist and author
- William Cecil, 5th Marquess of Exeter – aristocrat
- Henry Chadwick – former head of Christ Church, Oxford
- Sir John Chadwick – Lord Justice of Appeal
- H. K. Chainani – Chief Justice of Bombay High Court
- Hugh Cholmondeley, 6th Marquess of Cholmondeley – Lord Great Chamberlain
- Hugh Cholmondeley, 5th Baron Delamere – British peer
- Greg Clark – Member of Parliament for Tunbridge Wells; former Secretary of State for Business, Energy and Industrial Strategy and former President of the Board of Trade
- John Talbot Clifton – landowner and traveller
- Sam Coates – journalist
- Arthur Cohen – lawyer and Liberal politician; first Jewish graduate of Cambridge University
- Hugh Courtenay, 18th Earl of Devon – aristocrat
- Peter Cowie – film historian
- Stella Creasy – Member of Parliament for Walthamstow
- Joe Crowley – TV presenter and broadcast journalist
- Richard Cumberland – philosopher and Bishop of Peterborough in the Church of England
- Robyn Curnow – South African journalist and news anchor
- Kulada Charan Das Gupta – Chief Justice of Calcutta High Court
- Blessed William Dean – Catholic priest and martyr
- Katie Derham – TV newsreader
- Richard Deverell – director of the Royal Botanic Gardens, Kew
- Frank Dickens – biochemist
- Simon Doggart – Cambridge cricketer and a co-abuser in the Church of England John Smyth abuse of young men scandal
- Monty Don – gardener
- William Donaldson – creator of Henry Root
- John Douglas, 9th Marquess of Queensberry – aristocrat
- Nick Drake – poet and playwright
- Fuchsia Dunlop – writer and cook
- Henry Dunster – first president of Harvard University
- Sir James Eadie KC – barrister
- Sir Alexander Ellis – diplomat, former High Commissioner to India
- William Empson – literary critic and poet
- Nick Estcourt – mountaineer
- Derek Ezra, Baron Ezra – former chairman of the National Coal Board
- Julian Fellowes – actor and Academy Award-winning screenwriter
- Major Frederick Fermor-Hesketh, 2nd Baron Hesketh – British Army officer
- Eric Fernihough – Brooklands and world motorcycle speed record holder
- Hugh FitzRoy, 11th Duke of Grafton – aristocrat
- James FitzRoy, Earl of Euston – British financier and aristocrat
- Matthew Fosh – cricketer and rugby union player
- Peter Fudakowski – Academy Award-winning film producer
- Joe Garner – former CEO of Nationwide Building Society
- Bamber Gascoigne – TV presenter, University Challenge
- John Gaule – Puritan priest
- Robin Warwick Gibson – former Chief Curator of National Portrait Gallery, London; art historian & writer
- Prince Richard, Duke of Gloucester – member of the British royal family
- Prince William of Gloucester – member of the British royal family
- Joscelyn Godwin – historian and composer
- Maurice Goldhaber – American physicist
- Barnabas Gooch – vice-chancellor of the University of Cambridge and politician
- Reuben Goodstein – mathematician
- Iain Gordon – mathematician
- Siram Govindarajulu – founding vice-chancellor of Sri Venkateswara University
- David Grainger – British venture capitalist
- Charles Grant, 1st Baron Glenelg – British politician and colonial administrator; older brother of Robert
- Sir Robert Grant – British lawyer, politician, and hymnist; younger brother of Charles
- Andrew Green, Baron Green of Deddington – diplomat, founding president of MigrationWatchUK
- Sir Christopher Greenwood KC – Judge of the International Court of Justice (2009-2018)
- Antony Grey – pioneer in gay rights activism
- Richard Griffin, 3rd Baron Baybrooke – Whig politician
- Sir Loyd Grossman – chef, musician, television presenter, sauce maker
- Peter Grubb – ecologist
- Karl W. Gruenberg – British mathematician
- Jeremy Harding – writer
- William Hare, 5th Earl of Listowel – Labour politician
- Sir Norman Hartnell – couturier and dressmaker to the Queen
- Abdul Khalek Hassouna – Egyptian politician and diplomat, Secretary-General of the Arab League
- Gavin Hastings – international rugby sportsperson
- Julian Haviland – former Political Editor of ITN and The Times
- Nick Herbert, Baron Herbert of South Downs – Member of Parliament for Arundel and South Downs; former Minister of State for Police and Criminal Justice
- Michael Hofmann – poet and translator
- Adam Holloway – Member of Parliament for Gravesham, Reform politician
- Brigadier Martin Hotine – British Army officer and surveyor
- Sir Robert Howard – playwright
- David Hoyle – Dean of Westminster
- Guy Innes-Kerr, 10th Duke of Roxburghe – aristocrat
- George Cecil Ives – poet and homosexual rights activist
- John James – Archdeacon of Llandaff in the Church of Wales
- Oliver James – psychologist
- Sir Antony Jay – co-screenwriter of Yes Minister
- Richard Johnson – first chaplain to Australia
- Sir Richard Jolly – development economist
- Igor Judge, Baron Judge – Lord Chief Justice of England and Wales (2008–2013)
- Tim Kelsey – CEO of Beamtree
- Akhtar Hameed Khan – social scientist
- Charles Kingsley – author of The Water Babies and Regius Professor of Modern History
- R. F. Kuang – author; Hugo Award-winning Chinese American fantasy writer of Babel and The Poppy War; known also for Yellowface
- Charles La Trobe – first lieutenant-governor of Victoria, Australia
- David Lack – biologist
- Monsignor Mark Langham – Catholic priest, chaplain to the University of Cambridge at Fisher House
- Lewis H. Lapham – American writer; editor of Lapham's Quarterly; former editor of Harper's Magazine
- Sir Trafford Leigh-Mallory – air vice marshal at the Battle of Britain
- Major David Lindesay-Bethune, 15th Earl of Lindsay – British Army officer
- Chris Lintott – astrophysicist
- Selwyn Lloyd – former Foreign Secretary; Chancellor of the Exchequer and Speaker of the House of Commons
- Andrew Lownie – historian and author
- Lancelot Lowther, 6th Earl of Lonsdale – aristocrat
- Nicholas Luard – writer and politician
- Mark Malloch Brown – former United Nations Deputy Secretary-General and Minister of State at the Foreign and Commonwealth Office
- George Mallory – mountaineer who took part in the first three British expeditions to Mount Everest in the early 1920s
- William Mann – music critic on The Times (1948–1982)
- John Manningham – sixteenth- and seventeenth-century diarist, lawyer; noted for recording details of an original performance of Shakespeare's Twelfth Night
- Samuel Marsden – priest and missionary in the Church of England
- Kingsley Martin – journalist
- Tristan McConnell – journalist
- John McPhee – Pulitzer Prize-winning writer
- Sir Samuel Morland – diplomat, spy, inventor, mathematician
- Michael Morris, 3rd Baron Killanin – former president of the International Olympic Committee
- Roger Morris – electrical engineer
- Sir Andrew Morritt – Chancellor of the High Court of Justice
- Major Lord Leopold Mountbatten – British Army officer
- Ronald Muwenda Mutebi II – current Kabaka of Buganda
- Sir Edward Frederick Mutesa II – former Kabaka of Buganda and President of Uganda
- Charles Neville, 5th Baron Baybrooke – aristocrat
- Mike Newell – film director of Four Weddings and a Funeral and Harry Potter and the Goblet of Fire
- Adam Nicolson, 5th Baron Carnock – historian and author, son of Nigel Nicolson and grandson of Vita Sackville-West and Harold Nicolson
- Patrick Nixon – diplomat
- Charles Kay Ogden – literary critic
- Sir Jonathan Parker – Lord Justice of Appeal
- Charles Stewart Parnell (did not graduate) – Irish nationalist
- Daniel Pedoe – mathematician
- Francis Penrose – architect and astronomer
- Samuel Pepys – naval administrator, MP, and diarist
- Allen Dain Percival – musician and composer; Principal of the Guildhall School of Music; executive chairman of Stainer & Bell
- Sir Simon Picken – Judge of the High Court of Justice
- Ardal Powell – maker and player of historical flutes
- Francis Pym, Baron Pym – former Secretary of State for Foreign and Commonwealth Affairs
- Arthur Stanley Ramsey – mathematician, President of Magdalene College
- Michael Ramsey – Archbishop of Canterbury
- Julian Rathbone – English novelist and Booker Prize-shortlisted author
- Sir Michael Redgrave – actor
- Richard Rhys, 9th Baron Dynevor – aristocrat
- Jon Ridgeon – former British Olympic athlete and current CEO of World Athletics (2018–present)
- I. A. Richards – literary critic
- Sir Andrew Ritchie – High Court judge
- Stephen Christopher Rowell – historian
- Alan Rusbridger – editor of The Guardian
- Conroy Ryder, 8th Earl of Harrowby – aristocrat
- Warren Sach – United Nations executive
- Sir Frederic Salusbury – editor of the Daily Herald
- Rina Sawayama – singer
- Lieutenant Colonel James Scarlett, 8th Baron Abinger – British Army officer
- Colonel John Selwyn-Lloyd, Baron Selwyn-Lloyd – barrister, British Army officer, Conservative politician, Speaker of the House of Commons
- Nicholas Shakespeare – novelist
- Charles Shaughnessy, 5th Baron Shaughnessy – British actor
- Simon Shaps – TV producer
- John Shaw – American civil servant
- Robert Shirley, 13th Earl Ferrers – Conservative politician
- Major William Sidney, 1st Viscount De L'Isle – British Army officer, 15th governor-general of Australia
- John Simpson – journalist
- George Sinclair, 15th Earl of Caithness – Scottish aristocrat
- Bhalindra Singh – cricketer and politician
- Prince Frederick Duleep Singh – crown prince of Punjab
- Nicholas Snowman – arts administrator and chairman of the jewellers Wartski
- Jacob Soll – historian and philosopher
- Dame Sarah Springman – engineer and academic, Principal of St Hilda's College, Oxford
- Henry St John, 18th Baron St John of Bletso – British peer
- Sir Christopher Staughton – Lord Justice of Appeal
- James Stourton – art historian
- John Young Stratton – author, essayist, social reformer and campaigner against rural poverty
- Arthur Tedder, 1st Baron Tedder – Marshal of the Royal Air Force, World War II
- John Tedder, 2nd Baron Tedder – Professor of Chemistry; expert in free radical chemistry
- Sir Iain Tennant – businessman
- Nanavira Thera – Buddhist monk
- Major General Robert Thomson – British Army officer
- Charit Tingsabadh – Thai economist
- John Treasure – advertising executive
- Sir Richard Turnbull – British colonial administrator
- Sir Michael Turner – High Court judge
- Erik Varden – Catholic Bishop-Prelate of Trondheim
- Philip Vellacott – classical scholar
- Roger Vignoles – concert pianist and accompanist
- Rob Wainwright – international rugby player
- Geoffrey Webb – art historian
- Mark Weedon – cricketer
- Thomas Wentworth-Fitzwilliam, 10th Earl Fitzwilliam – aristocrat
- Chevalier Rafał de Weryha-Wysoczański – Polish art historian
- Geoffrey Whitney – sixteenth-century poet and emblematist
- John Woolley – cricketer
- Wong Yan-lung – Secretary for Justice of Hong Kong
- David Yelland – actor
