= John Probyn =

Anglican priest (died 1843)

John Probyn (died 1843) was an Anglican priest in the late 18th and early 19th centuries.

Probyn was born at Newland, Gloucestershire, a descendant of Sir Edmund Probyn. He was educated at Christ Church, Oxford. He held incumbencies at Abenhall and Matherne. He was Dean and Archdeacon of Llandaff from 1796 to his death on 4 October 1843.

Church of England titles
Preceded by John Porter	Archdeacon of Llandaff; 1796–1843	Succeeded by Thomas Williams
Inaugural appointment	Dean of Llandaff; 1840–1843	Succeeded by William Bruce Knight
