= Henry Lynch Blosse =

Welsh archdeacon

Henry Lynch Blosse was a nineteenth century Anglican priest.

The son of the 8th Baronet, he was educated at Trinity College, Dublin. After a curacy in Cardiff he was the Rector of Michaelston Le Pit, near Cardiff in 1838 then incumbent at Newcastle, Bridgend from 1839 to 1877. He became Archdeacon of Llandaff in 1859. He held this post until 1877, after which he was Dean of Llandaff until his death on 28 January 1879.

Church in Wales titles
Preceded by James Colquhoun Campbell	Archdeacon of Llandaff; 1859–1877	Succeeded by John Griffiths
Preceded by Thomas Williams	Dean of Llandaff; 1877–1879	Succeeded by Charles John Vaughan
