= Thomas Pritchard =

Thomas Pritchard may refer to:

- Thomas Farnolls Pritchard (1723–1777), English architect and interior decorator
- Tom Pritchard (1917–2017), New Zealand cricketer and centenarian
- Tom Pritchard (restaurateur) (1883–1964), restaurateur based in Manila

== See also ==
- William Thomas Pritchard (1829–1907), British consul and adventurer
- Roy Thomas Pritchard (1925–1993), English footballer
- Thomas Prichard (disambiguation)
