= John Quarre =

Welsh Anglican priest

John Quarre was a Welsh Anglican priest in the 16th century.

Langley was educated at Merton College, Oxford. He was Archdeacon of Llandaff from 1529 until 1540.
