= David Davies (archdeacon of Llandaff) =

Welsh archdeacon (1820–1930)

David Davies (1820 – June 1930) was Archdeacon of Llandaff from his appointment in 1924 until his death.

Born in Carmarthenshire, he was educated at Llandovery College, Shrewsbury School and Jesus College, Oxford and ordained in 1882. After curacies in Conwy and Cardiff he held incumbencies in Newcastle, Bridgend, Canton, Cardiff and Dinas Powis. He was Surroage for the Diocese of Llandaff from 1907; and a Canon Residentiary at its Cathedral from 1914.

Church in Wales titles
Preceded by James Buckley	Archdeacon of Llandaff; 1897–1897	Succeeded by John James
