= James Buckley (priest) =

Welsh archdeacon (1849–1924)

The Ven. James Rice Buckley , BD (28 January 1849 – 8 September 1924) was Archdeacon of Llandaff from 1913 until his death.

He was educated at Carmarthen Grammar School and St David's College, Lampeter; and ordained in 1872. After a curacy in Neath he was Vicar of Llandaff from 1878 to 1913. He was later a Surrogate for the Diocese of Llandaff; then its Rural Dean.

There is a statue of him on Llandaff’s Cathedral Green.

Church in Wales titles
Preceded by Frederic William Edmondes	Archdeacon of Llandaff; 1913–1924	Succeeded by David Davies
