= Thomas Blyth =

Canon Thomas Allen Blyth DD

Personal details
- Born: 7 January 1844 London, England
- Died: 19 July 1913 (aged 69)
- Education: Bedford Modern School; Queen's College, Oxford

Canon Thomas Allen Blyth DD (7 January 1844 – 19 July 1913), author, historian, editor of the Worcester Diocesan Calendar (1889), Hon. Canon of Worcester Cathedral (1898), examining Chaplain and Commissary to the Archbishop of Ottawa, Commissary to the Bishops of Niagara (from 1890) and Surrogate to the Diocese of Worcester (from 1900).

== Early life ==
Thomas Allen Blyth was born in London on 7 January 1844, the second son of Henry Ralph Blyth of Wivenhoe, Beaumont, London and Bedford. He was educated at Bedford Modern School and Queen's College, Oxford (BA (Hons in Theology) 1882, MA 1885, BD 1888, DD 1892).

== Career ==
Blyth was an Assistant Master at the Bedford Schools (1865–75) and ordained in 1875. He was Curate of Wymondham, Norfolk (1875–77), Clifton-upon-Dunsmore (1877–78), Thame (1879–81) and St Saviour in the Parish of Upper Chelsea (1884–85). He was a Fellow of the Educational Institute of Scotland (1870); Hon. Fellow Academy of Roman Citizens (1870); PhD and MA, University of Göttingen (1870).

Blyth was vice-chairman of the Foleshill Board of Guardians (1887–92) and was made editor of the Worcester Diocesan Calendar in 1889. He was Hon. Canon of Worcester Cathedral (1898), examining Chaplain and Commissary to the Archbishop of Ottawa, Commissary to the Bishops of Niagara (from 1890), Chairman of the Stoke School Board (1897–99) and Surrogate to the Diocese of Worcester (from 1900).

Blyth was made a Doctor of Divinity of the University of Durham in 1901 and was a senior fellow of the Geological Society of Edinburgh. In addition to his official church duties, Blyth was an author, translator and historian producing 38 works in 61 publications, many Latin translations.

== Family life ==
Blyth married Mary Jane, 3rd daughter of John Hands of Grandborough House, Grandborough, Warwickshire. They had a son and a daughter. He died on 19 July 1913.

== Bibliography ==
- Sir William Harpur, Lord Mayor of London in 1561. Published 1864
- John Bunyan and his Church
- The Stranger's Guide to the Bedford Schools, 1864
- Burt's Bedford Directory and History of the Churches of Bunyan, Howard, and Wesley; John Jukes, 1866
- The Bedford Directory and Almanac, 1866
- Carter's Directory and History of the Ancient Parish Churches of Bedford, 1869
- Metallography as a Separate Science, 1871
- The History of Bedford, 1873; John Huss, 1879
- Plato’s Meno, literally translated
- The Oxford Logic Chart
- Terence's Andria, Phormio, and Heauton Timorumenos, literally translated
- The Oxford Handbook of Logic, 1880
- Xenophon’s Memorabilia, I, II, IV, literally translated
- The Undergraduate's Guide to the Holy Gospels
- Lecture Notes on Human Physiology, 1881
- Questions and Exercises in Advanced Logic, 1881
- Rudiments of Faith and Religion
- Guide to Matriculation and Responsions at Oxford
- Livy's History of Rome, XXI, XXII, XXIII, literally translated, 1882
- Homer’s Iliad, I to IV, Cæsar de Bello Gallico, I to IV, literally translated, 1883
- Plato’s Apology of Socrates, literally translated, 1884
- Handbook for the Clergy, 1893
- The History of Stoke-in-Coventry, 1897
- The Thirty-nine Articles, 3rd edn, 1899
- Editor, Oxford Translations of the Classics
- The Oxford Science Primers
- Oxford Aids to The Schools, 1878–85
