= John Rogers (dean of Llandaff) =

Dean of Llandaff, Wales (1934–2023)

John Rogers (27 November 1934 – 16 February 2023) was Dean of Llandaff from 1993 to 1999.

== Biography ==
John Rogers was born on 27 November 1934 and educated at the University of Wales, Oriel College, Oxford and St Stephen's House, Oxford. Ordained in 1960 his first post was at St Martin, Roath. He served the church in Guyana from 1963 until 1971. He held incumbencies at Caldicot, Monmouth and Ebbw Vale before his appointment as Dean.

Rogers retired to Myddfai, continuing to officiate in parishes around the upper Tywi valley. He died at a care home in Llandovery on 16 February 2023, at the age of 88.

Church of England titles
Preceded by Alun Radcliffe Davies	Dean of Llandaff; 1993–2000	Succeeded by John Lewis
