= John Evans (archdeacon of Llandaff) =

Welsh archdeacon (1695–1749)

John Evans, D.D. (c. 1695 - 23 March 1749) was Archdeacon of Llandaff from 1722 to 1749 and a Canon Residentiary of Llandaff Cathedral from 1721.

Evans was born at Upton Bishop and educated at Trinity College, Oxford. He held livings at Lugwardine, Bromyard and Upton Bishop. He died on 23 March 1749.

Church in Wales titles
Preceded by George Bull	Archdeacon of Llandaff; 1722–1749	Succeeded by John Fulham
