= Janet Henderson =

Dean of Llandaff, Wales (born 1957)

Janet Henderson (born 1957) is a Welsh Anglican priest and former nurse. In 2012, she became the first woman appointed to the post of Dean of Llandaff.

== Early life ==
Henderson was born in Neath and grew up in Llandrindod Wells and Aberystwyth. She was educated at Ardwyn Grammar School Aberystwyth and Howell's School Llandaff. She went on to a career in nursing working at Addenbrooke's Hospital, Cambridge. She left nursing to become an Anglican priest. She studied theology and trained for ordination at Cranmer Hall, Durham. In 1988, she graduated from Durham University with a first class honours Bachelor of Arts (BA) degree.

== Religious life ==
In 1988, Henderson was ordained an Anglican deacon at Ely Cathedral. She later became one of the Church of England's first women priests, ordained at Southwell Minster in 1994. She served a curacy at St Peter and Paul, in Wisbech, before moving to Nottingham, where she served in the Bestwood Team Ministry, Bestwood. She was appointed lecturer in Worship at St John's College, Nottingham in 1993 and moved to the Cambridge Theological Federation in 1997 where she spent four years teaching worship and was Tutor and Director of Studies at Ridley Hall Theological College. In 2001, she left Ridley to become Priest-in-Charge at St Patrick’s, Nuthall and Dean of Women's Ministry in the Diocese of Southwell and Nottingham. From 2004 she was also an honorary canon of Southwell Minster.

In 2007 she became the first woman to be appointed as an archdeacon in the Province of York when she accepted the posts of Archdeacon of Richmond in the Diocese of Ripon and Leeds and residentiary canon of Ripon Cathedral. Between 2009 and 2013 she served as a Director of St John's College Durham and a Trustee of St Michael's Hospice, Harrogate. In November 2012 she was appointed as Dean of Llandaff, the first woman Dean of Llandaff and the second woman Dean in Wales, and was installed in March 2013. Henderson held the position for just two months, resigning in early May, with no official explanation given. Since 2013, she has served as the Spiritual and Pastoral Care Manager at Saint Michael's Hospice, Harrogate.

Henderson is the co-editor of Pastoral Prayers (ed. Deadman, Fletcher, Henderson and Lake, Mowbray Cassell, London, 1996). From 2010 to 2013 she blogged at Archdeacon in the Dales and from 2013 at Social Horizons.

Church of England titles
Preceded by Ken Good	Archdeacon of Richmond; 2007 - 2012	Succeeded by Nicholas Henshall
Church in Wales titles
Preceded by John Thomas Lewis	Dean of Llandaff; 2012 - 2013	Succeeded by Gerwyn Capon
