= Edmondes =

Edmondes is a surname. Notable people with the surname include:

- Charles Edmondes (1838–1893) English clergyman
- Clement Edmondes (c. 1568–1622) English government politician
- Frederic Edmondes (1840–1918) Archdeacon of Llandaff
- Thomas Edmondes (1563–1639) English politician
- William Edmondes (1903–1968) Australian politician
