= John James (archdeacon of Llandaff) =

Welsh archdeacon

John Daniel James was Archdeacon of Llandaff from his appointment in 1930 until his death on 17 January 1938.

He was educated at Magdalene College, Cambridge and ordained in 1886. After curacies in Llangefni and Abergavenney, he held incumbencies in Goytre and Llwynypia. He was Surrogate for the Diocese of Llandaff from 1895; and Vicar of Cadoxton-juxta-Neath from 1900.

Church in Wales titles
Preceded by David Davies	Archdeacon of Llandaff; 1930–1938	Succeeded by Richard Jones
