= Charles Griffith (priest) =

Welsh Anglican priest (1857–1934)

Charles Edward Thomas Griffith (28 August 1857 - 25 June 1934) was Dean of Llandaff from 1913 until 1926.

Griffith was educated at Trinity College, Cambridge, and ordained in 1882. After a curacy in Merthyr Tydfil, he was Vicar of Blaenavon, then Trevethin. He was Rector of Machen from 1901 until his appointment as Dean.

Church of England titles
Preceded by William Davey	Dean of Llandaff; 1913–1926	Succeeded by Frederick Worsley
