= Gerwyn Capon =

Dean of Llandaff, Wales (born 1965)

Gerwyn Huw Capon (born 9 April 1965) is a Welsh Anglican priest serving as Archdeacon of Montgomery in the Church in Wales Diocese of St Asaph. He was Dean of Llandaff from 2014 until 2022.

Capon was educated at Liverpool Polytechnic and St Stephen's House, Oxford; and ordained in 2004. After a curacy at St Mary's Church, West Derby, Liverpool, he was Chaplain to the Archbishop of Wales from 2007 to 2009. He was Priest in charge of Holy Trinity Church, Bolton-le-Sands from 2009 to 2012 and again Archbishop's Chaplain from 2012 until his appointment as Dean. He was installed as Dean on 28 February 2014. He announced his resignation on 17 May 2022, following his withdrawal of the allegation of bullying which he had made against the Bishop of Llandaff, June Osborne.

On 31 January 2023 he was installed as the Rector for the Benefice of Thaxted, the Sampfords, Radwinter and Hempstead, in rural Essex. He was collated Archdeacon of Montgomery on 1 September 2024.

Church in Wales titles
Preceded by Janet Henderson	Dean of Llandaff; 2014–2022	Succeeded by Richard Peers
