= Charles Vaughan (priest) =

English scholar and priest

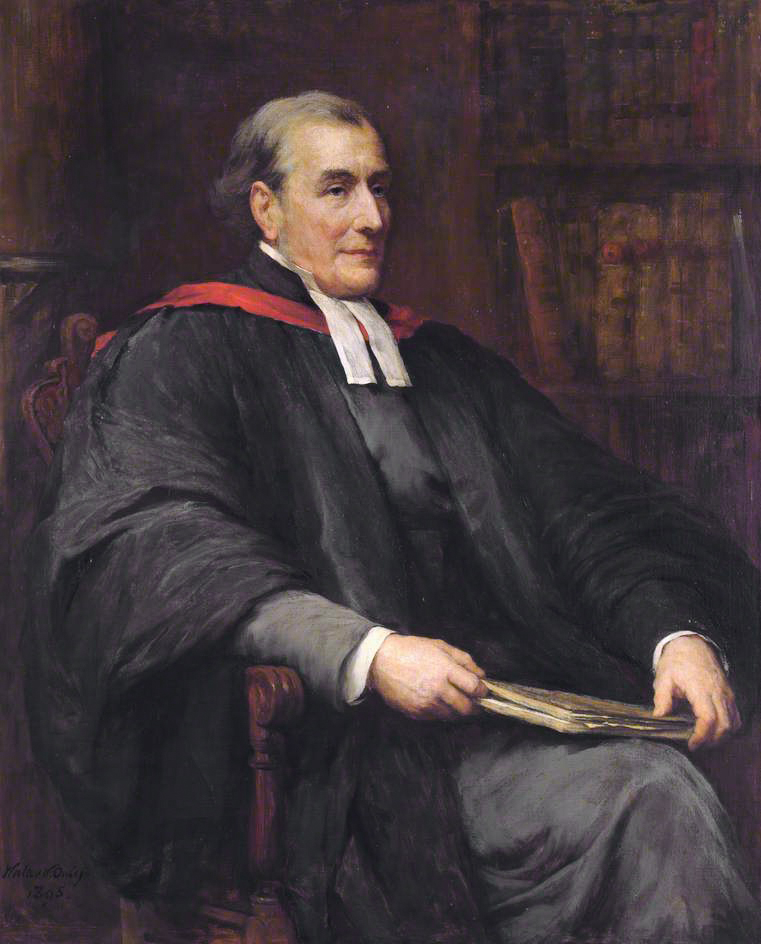
Charles John Vaughan (Walter William Ouless, 1895), portrait in the collection of Trinity College, Cambridge.

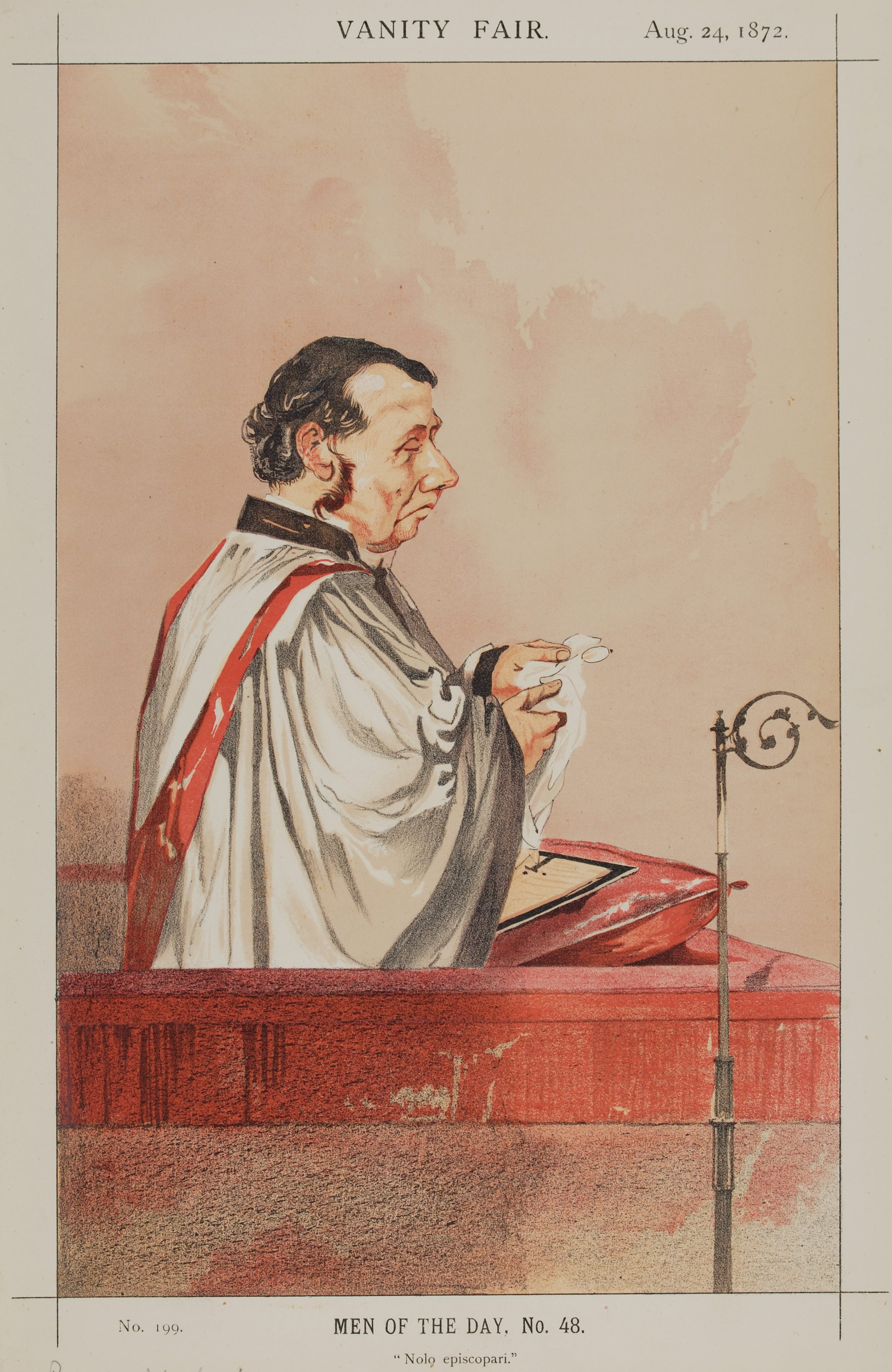
"Nolo episcopari" Chromolithograph caricature of Vaughan in Vanity Fair, 24 August 1872

Charles John Vaughan (16 August 1816 – 15 October 1897) was an English scholar and Anglican churchman.

== Life ==
He was born in Leicester, the second son of the Revd Edward Thomas Vaughan, vicar of St Martin's, Leicester. He was educated at Rugby School and Trinity College, Cambridge, where he was bracketed senior classic with Lord Lyttelton in 1838. In 1839 he was elected a fellow of Trinity, and for a short time studied law. He took orders in 1841, and became vicar of St Martin's, Leicester. Three years later he was elected headmaster of Harrow School. He resigned the headship in 1859; this was, secretly, because of his homosexuality having become known. In 1860 he was appointed vicar of Doncaster; in this capacity he was celebrant of the marriage of the new Headmaster of Harrow School, the Revd Henry Montagu Butler, in December 1861. In 1863 he accepted the bishopric of Rochester but afterward withdrew his acceptance. He was appointed Master of the Temple in 1869, and Dean of Llandaff in 1879, a post he held until his death. In 1894 he was elected president of University College, Cardiff, in recognition of the prominent part he took in its foundation.

Vaughan was a well-known Broad Churchman, an eloquent preacher and an able writer on theological subjects, his numerous works including lectures, commentaries and sermons. His greatest contribution to the Church of England was the help he gave to over 400 graduates preparing themselves for Ordination. These men became known as 'Vaughan's doves'. Eighteen of them became Bishops, and two of them Archbishops.

Vaughan wrote the first published New Testament commentary that utilized the scholarship of Brooke Foss Westcott and Fenton Hort. In his 1859 book St. Paul's Epistle to the Romans: with notes Vaughan thanked Westcott for allowing him to use the text being prepared for the new recension.

"Mr Westcott has thus allowed me to anticipate (with regard to this Epistle) the publication of that complete recension of the text of the New Testament, on which he has been for some time engaged."

In 1871, Vaughan joined the English Revision Committee, New Testament company, where the text of Westcott and Hort became the working papers source for the Revision Committee. Westcott had been an assistant master under Vaughan at Harrow from 1852 to 1859.

Vaughan died in 1897 in the Llandaff deanery and was buried within the cathedral grounds. He had married in 1850 Catherine Maria Stanley, youngest daughter of Edward Stanley, Bishop of Norwich.

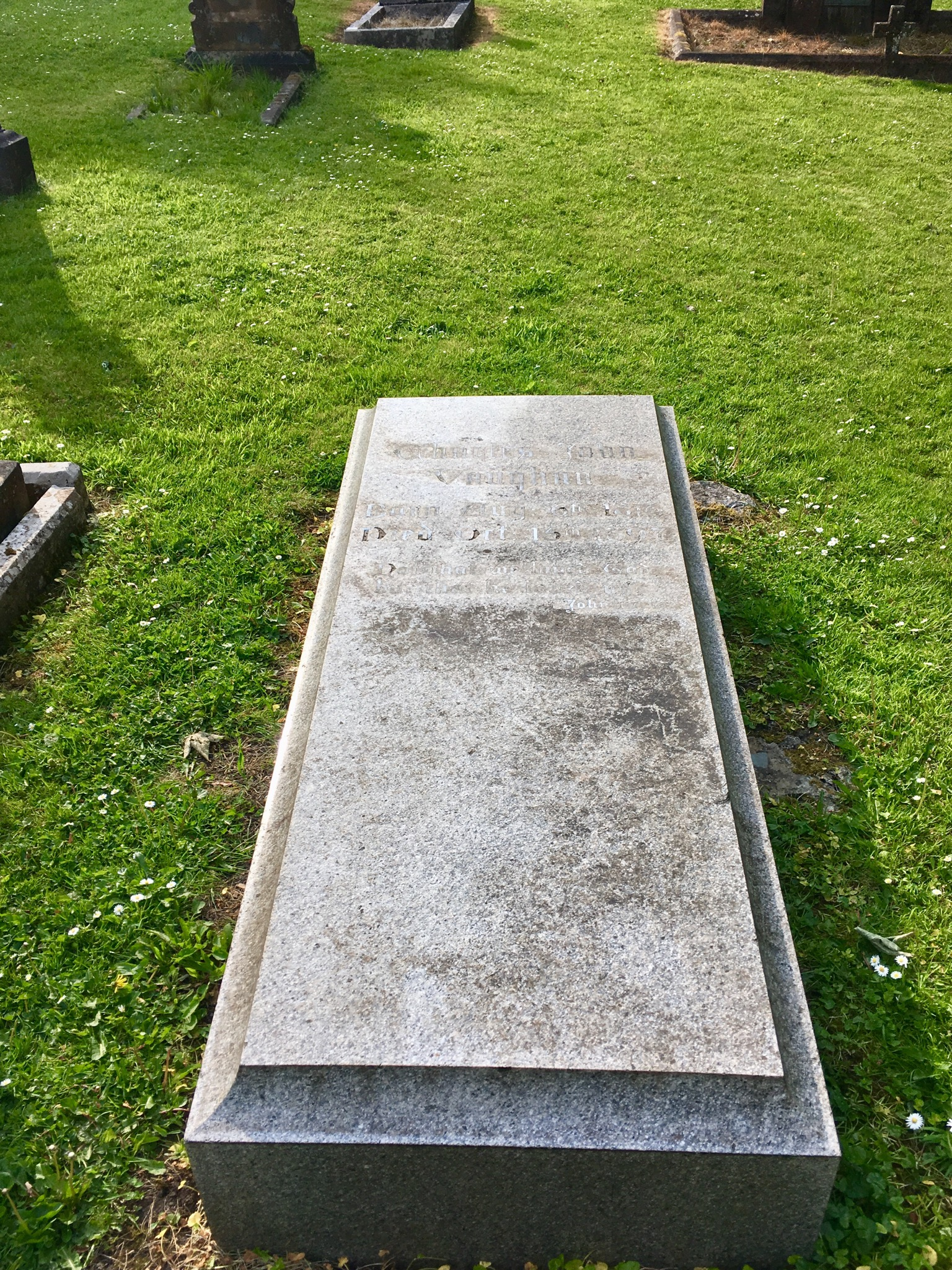
Vaughan's grave in the churchyard of Llandaff Cathedral, May 2020

F. D. How included Vaughan in the 1904 book Six Great Schoolmasters.

== Alleged paedophilia at Harrow ==
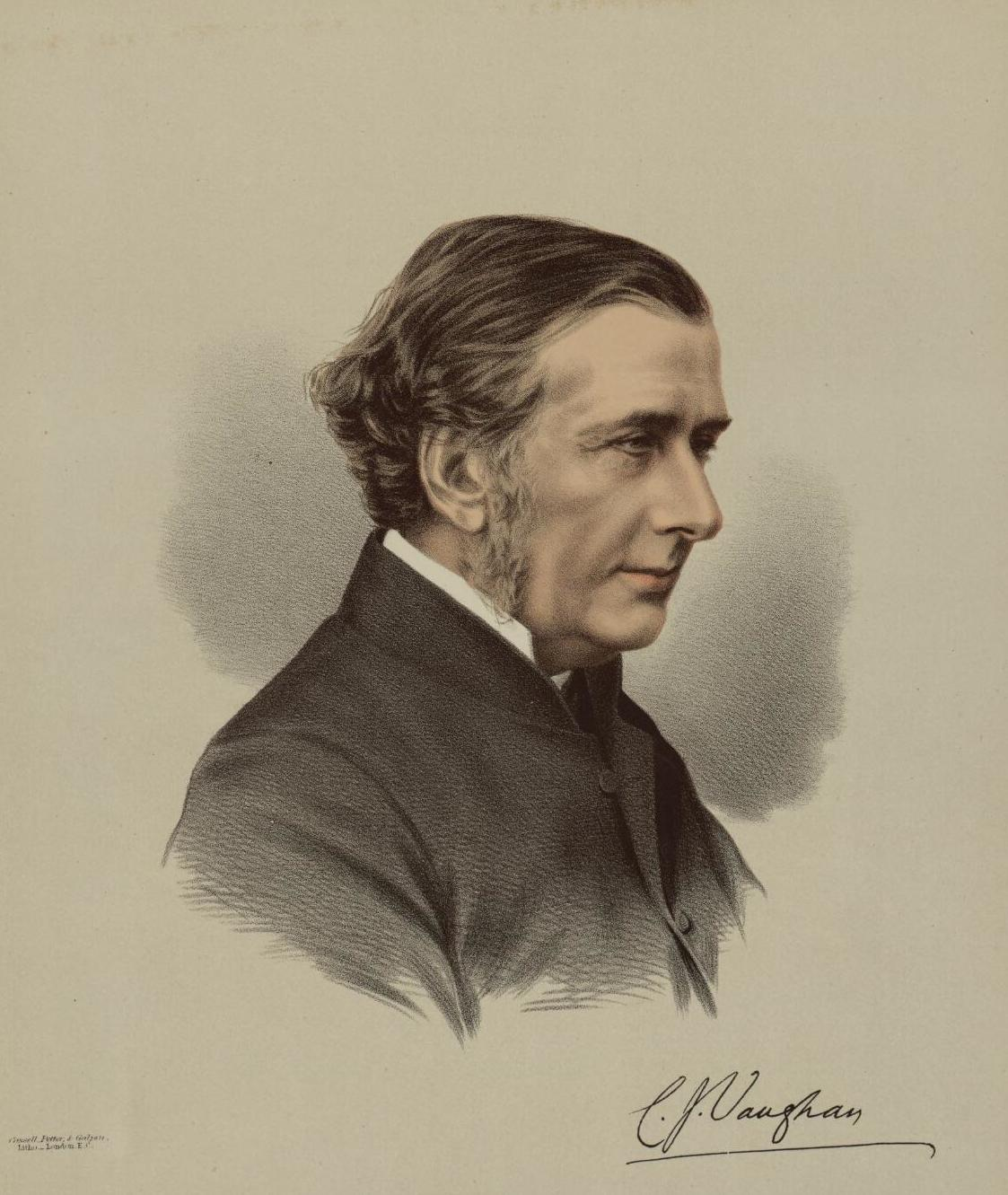
Portrait of Charles John Vaughan, 1870s

Until the 1970s no convincing reason for Vaughan's resignation from Harrow School was known. Speculation ended when Phyllis Grosskurth discovered the diaries of John Addington Symonds, who attended Harrow School while Vaughan was headmaster. The following account based on what Symonds wrote is accepted in some quarters, though uncorroborated; but John Roach writing in the Oxford Dictionary of National Biography points to discrepancies in the dates, and Symonds's own sexual orientation, as reasons to suspend judgement.

Harrow in the 1840s and 1850s had a schoolboy homosexual culture. Jonathan Gathorne-Hardy calls it "an adolescent boy's jungle; a jungle where lust and brute strength raged completely unrestrained". Symonds was propositioned numerous times. A master at Harrow intercepted a note between two of the boys, and passed it to Vaughan. He summoned the whole school immediately, and read the whole letter aloud. He then banned the sending of such letters, and the use of female nicknames, and flogged both culprits.

Through this incident Vaughan was, in the words of Gathorne-Hardy, "... not for the first time... in the grip of a devastating physical passion which he was completely unable to control." In early 1858, Alfred Pretor (1840–1908), a spirited, good-looking friend of Symonds, sent Symonds a letter, telling him that he was having an affair with Vaughan, and showed him several love letters. Symonds did not mention the incident for over a year, and then in 1859, gave the whole story to John Conington. Conington told Symonds to tell his father John Addington Symonds, a doctor.

Symonds senior wrote to Vaughan to inform him that he knew of his behaviour with Pretor. He would not expose him publicly, as long as Vaughan agreed to resign at once. After a long confrontation, about which nothing is known, Vaughan agreed. On 16 September Vaughan sent a circular to the parents. It read: "I have resolved after much deliberation, to take that opportunity of relieving myself from the long pressure of these heavy duties and anxious responsibilities which are inseparable from such an office, even under the most favourable circumstances." Four years later, in 1863, Vaughan accepted the position of Bishop of Rochester, ignoring Symonds's demand that Vaughan also never hold any high position in the church. Symonds telegraphed Vaughan, ordering him to resign or risk public exposure. So he resigned again. According to Noel Annan, "only after the elder Symonds' death did Vaughan dare to accept the deanery of Llandaff, where his ordinands were known as 'Vaughan's doves.'"

Pretor was furious about the younger Symonds's part in the scandal and refused to speak to him; but the secret was kept. Horatio Brown, Symonds's biographer and literary executor, skipped the Harrow years, saying merely "The autobiography of the Harrow period is not copious". On his death Vaughan had all his papers destroyed and forbade any biography of him to be written. Vaughan had maintained his friendship with Pretor until his death and at his request Pretor undertook the duties of his literary executor.

== Works ==
- The Presence of God in His Temple
- Authorised or Revised?

== See also ==
- The Fall of Doctor Onslow by Frances Vernon is a novel loosely based on events surrounding Vaughan's resignation from Harrow.

== Sources ==
- Bibliographic directory from Project Canterbury.
- Gathorne-Hardy, Jonathan (1977). The Old School Tie: The Phenomenon of the English Public School. Viking Press. ISBN 0-670-52316-X
- Park, Trevor (2014). Nolo Episcopari: A Life of C. J. Vaughan. ISBN 978-0-9508325-4-8
