= John Treasure =

British advertising executive (1924–2004)

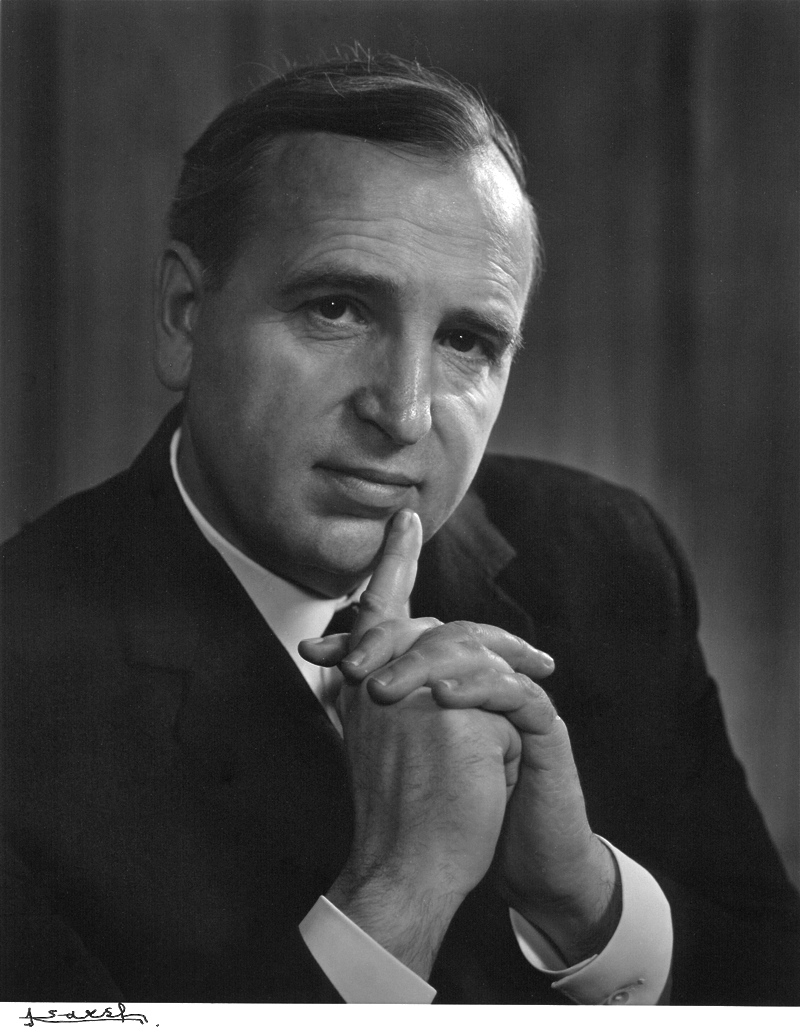
- John Treasure by Yousuf Karsh.
- Born: 20 June 1924; Usk, Monmouthshire
- Died: 9 February 2004 (aged 79); Kingston upon Thames
- Occupation: Advertising executive
- Known for: Chairman J Walter Thompson, vice chairman Saatchi & Saatchi

John Treasure (20 June 1924 – 9 February 2004) was a leading figure in the British advertising industry in the 1960s, 70s and 80s. He was chairman of J Walter Thompson in the UK while it was the country's number one agency, and then vice chairman of Saatchi & Saatchi when it in turn held the number one position; he was also Dean of City University Business School and Master of the Worshipful Company of Marketors. He was a potent proponent of the economic and social value of his industry, and became known as "Mr Advertising."

== Early life and rise in BMRB and JWT ==
John Albert Penberthy Treasure was born at Usk, in Monmouthshire, on 20 June 1924. The son of a bank clerk, he was brought up in Cardiff, where he was educated at the High School, and went on to take first-class honours in economics at University College, then part of the University of Wales. In 1947 he won a Kemsley Fellowship to spend two years in America. He returned to teach and read for a doctorate at Magdalene College, Cambridge; his thesis, On problems of the British export trade, later had some influence on the reporting of balance of payments figures. Meanwhile, he made ends meet by offering guided tours of Cambridge's colleges which earned him £5 a day. He met and married Valerie Bell during this period, and to finance his PhD studies, in 1952 he joined the British Market Research Bureau (BMRB). By 1957, he was BMRB's managing director; by 1960, director of the marketing and research department at its parent company, J Walter Thompson. While running this 60-strong department, he set up a research and development committee to plan and manage JWT's substantial research budget. Innovations during this period included the TV Attention Survey (a prototype of modern TV audience research which gave useful insights, enabled JWT to buy airtime better and became a remarkable new business tool) and the creative workshop, which tested new and experimental ideas with qualitative research. JWT became the standard bearer of modern market research and the theory of how advertising works, what it does and how to measure it.

== 'Mr Advertising' ==
In 1967, at the age of 43, Treasure became JWT chairman. Between then and 1976, when he resigned, he presided over one of the most successful periods in the long life of that agency: under his chairmanship, JWT in the UK grew fourfold in recorded billings from £20 million to £80 million. Treasure became a director of the J Walter Thompson company worldwide, becoming vice chairman in 1974, and was president of both the Institute of Practitioners in Advertising and the Market Research Society. He was also president of the National Advertising Benevolent Society and later of the History of Advertising Trust, where he remained a governor until 2002; he also headed a Conservative Party committee on communications. Not only to the advertising village, but also to a much wider world outside, he became known as 'Mr Advertising'. When he was the subject of Bernard Levin's chat show The Levin Interview in 1966, the television critic of The Sunday Times wrote: "On the level of civil, intelligent Q&A it was very good. A good deal of rubbish that is talked about advertising, from both sides, was sensibly disposed of".

== Academia and the Saatchis ==
He left the agency world in 1977 at the age of 52 to become Dean and Professor of Marketing at the City University Business School, where in four years he raised the school's profile, expanded its range and secured new professorial posts and premises. He returned to the commercial advertising world in 1980, running his own agency John Treasure and Partners, which then merged with Freeman Mathews Milne to become Freeman Mathews Treasure, before the Saatchi brothers, possibly in recognition of the role he had played in suggesting them to Margaret Thatcher for the Conservative Party account, invited him to become vice-chairman of their rapidly growing agency. He joined Saatchi & Saatchi in 1983, and added weight and gravitas to the predominantly young and aggressive management team there for several years.

== Taylor Nelson and the Marketors ==
In 1989 he moved back to his first love, market research, to become chairman of Taylor Nelson AGB plc, and presided over its acquisition of Sofres to become the world's number two market research group. In the Millennium year he was a well-connected, highly regarded Master of the Worshipful Company of Marketors. He retired the following year, and though he was active in Richmond, Surrey (he chaired the Friends of Old Deer Park and raised money for Richmond Theatre and the Museum of Richmond) his health declined from then on.

== Character and influence ==
Colleague and industry commentator Jeremy Bullmore wrote: "Although he retained a certain reserve all his life, Treasure was always possessed of presence; he commanded attention. He chaired meetings and spoke in public with natural confidence and evident enjoyment.... The source of this authority was a clear and analytical mind, combined with an enviable ability to express complicated thoughts in jargon-free language.... Treasure's intellectual curiosity, his withering contempt for flabby thinking and his fascination with theory had a liberating effect on others. His presence seemed to grant implicit permission to experiment, to speculate and to innovate."

Possibly the best evidence of Treasure's intense focus and competitive nature came from golf. He took up the game at the age of 50, becoming an active member of Royal Mid-Surrey Golf Club – and within five years, with RMS professional David Talbot, he had become good enough to compete in the State Express 555 National Pro-Am Championship at Penina in Portugal. He holed a 40-footer on the 18th green to draw level with the leaders, and the pair went on to win the play-off; at the winners' press conference, Treasure revealed that he had dreamed the night before that he would win with just such a putt, provoking the headline "Prophetic Prof Sinks Dream Putt". Good publicity was in his nature.

John Treasure's influence on the advertising profession and its image in the UK was significant and lasting: Maurice (later Baron) Saatchi called him "one of the great figures of advertising". Hamish Pringle, the IPA director-general, said: "With John's passing we have lost another giant of UK advertising. His contribution to the industry was enormous."

John Treasure died in Kingston Hospital on 9 February 2004. His papers from his time at JWT are stored as the John Treasure Collection at the History of Advertising Trust.

== Additional sources ==
- Financial Times, London: 19.02.04
- Sunday Times, London: profile 09.10.77
- New Society Magazine, London: 17.1.74
- South Wales Echo, Cardiff: 3 Feb 1966
