= David Lee (archdeacon of Llandaff) =

British Christian clergy

David Stanley Lee (born 20 February 1930) is a British clergyman in the Church in Wales who was Archdeacon of Llandaff, from 1991 to 1997.

== Biography ==
Lee was born on 20 February 1930, educated at the University of Wales, and ordained in 1958. After curacies in Caerau and Port Talbot – pioneering an industrial chaplaincy to the steelworks, he was Rector of Merthyr Tydfil until his appointment as Archdeacon.

Church in Wales titles
Preceded by Albert Lewis	Archdeacon of Llandaff; 1991–1997	Succeeded by Bill Thomas
