= Alun Davies (priest) =

Welsh Anglican priest

Alun Radcliffe Davies (6 May 1923 – 8 June 2003) was a Welsh Anglican priest in the last third of the twentieth century.

Davies was born on 6 May 1923 into an ecclesiastical family: his father was the Revd Canon Rhys Hughes Davies. He was educated at Cowbridge Grammar School, University College, Cardiff, Keble College, Oxford and St. Michael's College, Llandaff. After a curacy in Roath he was a Lecturer at St. Michael's College, Llandaff then Domestic Chaplain to the Archbishop of Wales. He was a Chaplain in the RNR until 1960 when he became Vicar of Ystrad Mynach. He was Chancellor of Llandaff Cathedral from 1969 to 1971; Archdeacon of Llandaff from 1971 to 1977; a Residentiary Canon of Llandaff Cathedral from 1975 to 1977; Dean of Llandaff from 1977 to 1993; and Chaplain to the Lord Lieutenant of South Glamorgan from 1994 until his death on 8 June 2003.

He had two sons and a daughter with his wife Winifred who died in 1999.

Church of England titles
Preceded by John Williams	Archdeacon of Llandaff; 1971–1977	Succeeded by Lewis Clarke
Preceded by John Williams	Dean of Llandaff; 1977–1993	Succeeded by John Rogers
