= Carrickmacross lace =

Net lace originating in Ireland

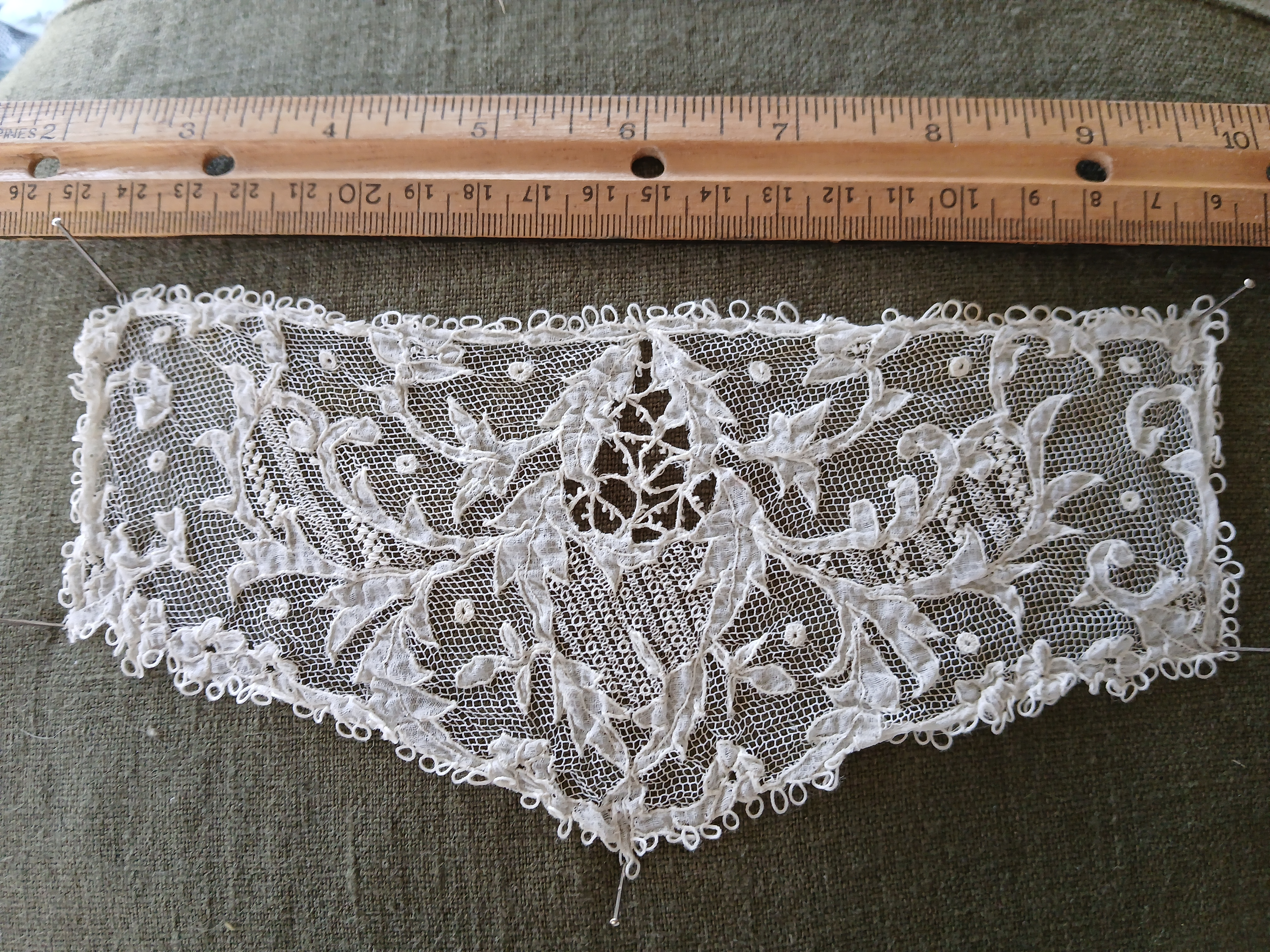
- Example of Carrickmacross lace
- Type: Lace
- Material: cotton
- Production method: Needle lace
- Production process: Craft production
- Place of origin: Carrickmacross, Ireland
- Introduced: c. 1820

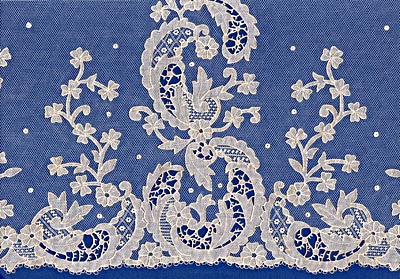
Carrickmacross lace

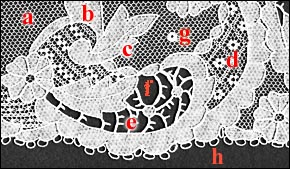
Detail of Carrickmacross lace.; (a) area of net, (b) area of muslin, (c) outlining, (d) needle-run decoration, (e) bars, (f) area where both net and muslin have been cut away, (g) 'pop', (h) 'twirl'.

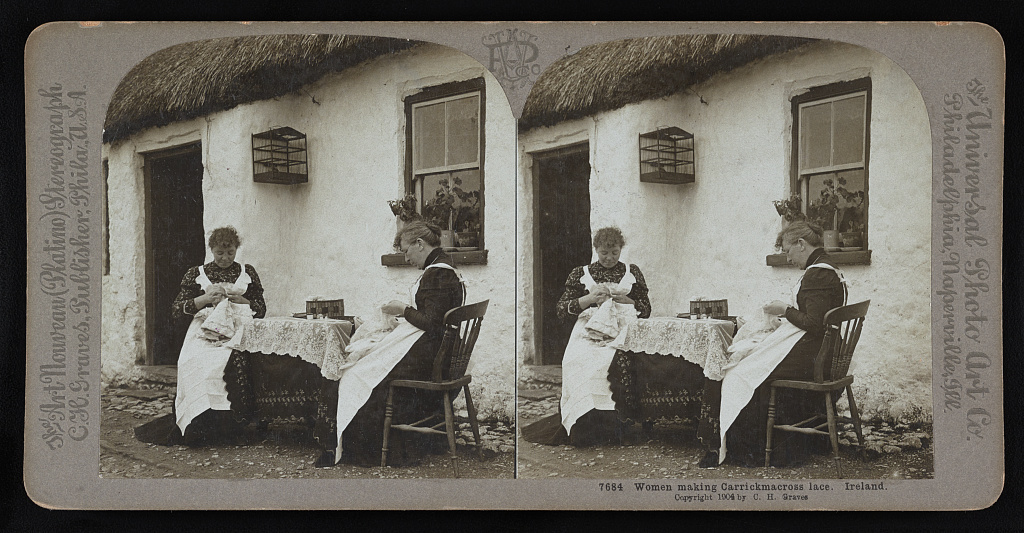
Women making Carrickmacross lace, Ireland

Carrickmacross lace is a form of lace that may be described as decorated net. A three-layer 'sandwich' is made consisting of the pattern (at the bottom), covered with, first, machine-made net and then fine muslin, through which the pattern can be seen. A thick outlining thread is stitched down along the lines of the pattern, sewing net and fabric together. Loops of thread known as 'twirls' are also couched along the outer edge. The excess fabric is then cut away. Some of the net is then usually decorated further with needle-run stitches or small button-holed rings known as 'pops'. Occasionally bars of buttonhole stitches are worked over fabric and net before both are cut away.

Carrickmacross skills continue to be taught to new lacemakers, and contemporary patterns that include traditional Irish motifs like the Celtic harp and the claddagh ring are available to textile artists today.

== History ==
Carrickmacross lace was introduced into Ireland in about 1820 by Mrs Grey Porter of Donaghmoyne, who taught it to local women so that they could earn some extra money. Porter had been inspired by some examples of appliqué lace she had seen while on her honeymoon in Italy in 1816. It was only in 1872 that the name Carrickmacross came to define the style.

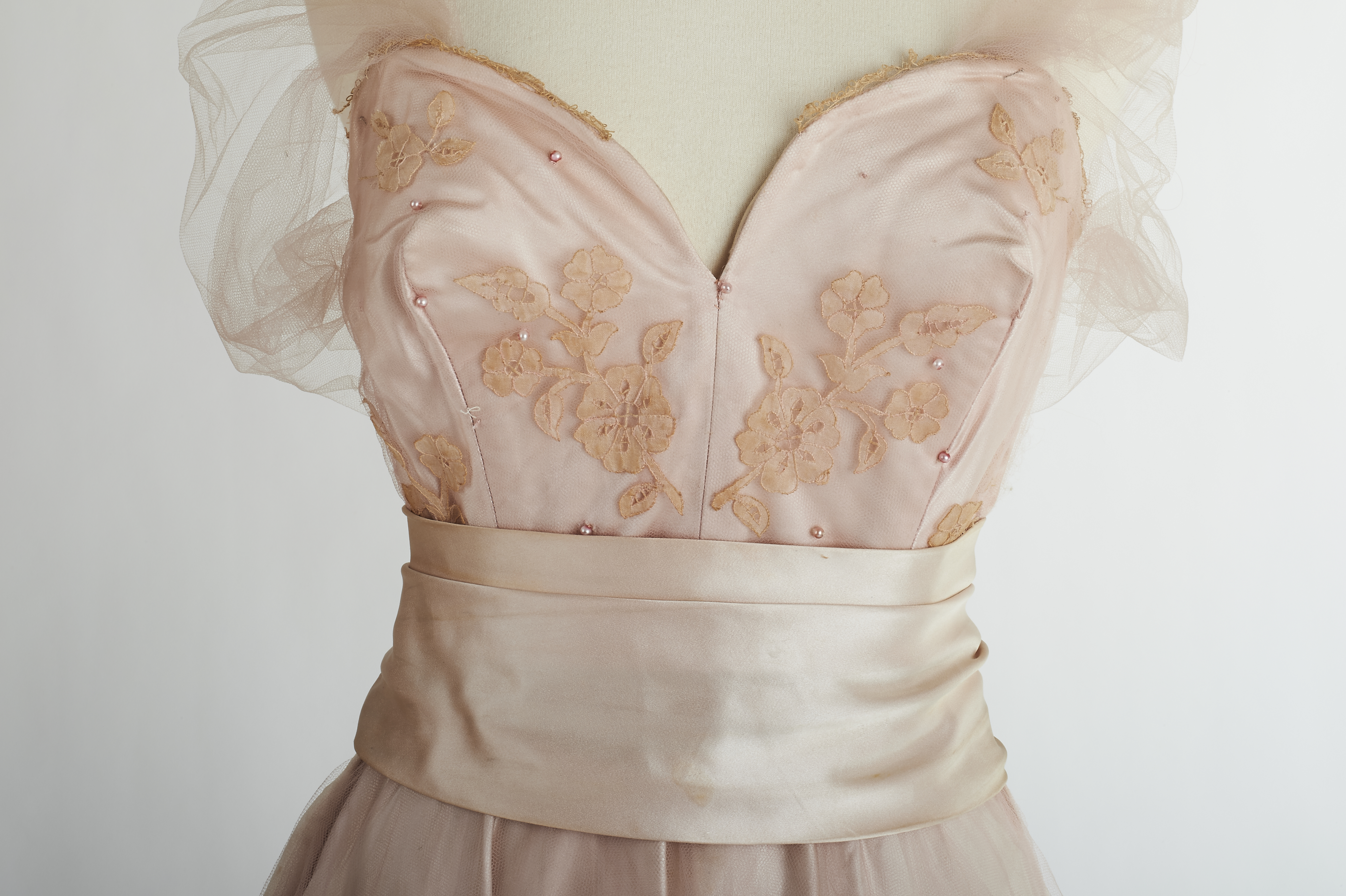
Pink Ice gown by Sybil Connolly, Carrickmacross lace over satin

The scheme was initially of limited success, and it was only after the Great Famine in 1846, when a lace school was set up by the managers of the Bath and Shirley estates at Carrickmacross as a means of helping their starving tenants, that the lace became known and found sales.

The wedding dress of Lady Diana Spencer featured a square of Carrickmacross lace that had belonged to Queen Mary sewn to the front.

Irish fashion designer Sybil Connolly (24 January 1921 – 6 May 1998) used Irish lace types in her design, often layering the lace over silk or satin.

In 2011, Catherine Middleton incorporated lace inspired by Carrickmacross lace, amongst others, into her wedding dress.

Irish lacemakers continue to hone their craft on both souvenir objects as well as contemporary couture fashion garments.

== Materials and Techniques ==
Carrickmacross lace is made with a series of layers, with a top layer of organdie, then tulle or netting if creating applique style, the traced pattern, and tissue paper at the base. If the guipure form is selected, the netting layer is omitted. Sewing thread is used to attach a heavier outline cord to the materials. Cutwork areas are created with special scissors that are designed to protect netting and threads from accidental damage.
