= Albert Lewis (priest) =

Welsh Anglican priest

- Church: Anglican Church in Wales
- Diocese: Llandaff
- Appointed: Archdeacon of Llandaff
- In office: 1988–1991
- Predecessor: Herbert Lewis Clarke
- Successor: David Lee
- Previous post: Archdeacon of Margam (1981–1988)

Orders
- Ordination: 1945

Personal details
- Born: 1921
- Died: 2008 (aged 86–87)
- Education: University College of South Wales, St. Michael's College, Llandaff

Albert John Francis Lewis (1921-2008) was a Welsh Anglican priest in the late twentieth century: he was the Archdeacon of Margam from 1981 to 1988; and Archdeacon of Llandaff from 1988 to 1991.

He was educated at the University College of South Wales and St. Michael's College, Llandaff; and ordained in 1945. After a curacy in Cardiff he was the incumbent at Pendoylan until his appointment as Archdeacon.

Church in Wales titles
Preceded by David Reece	Archdeacon of Margam; 1981–1988	Succeeded by Douglas Gordon James
Preceded by Herbert Lewis Clarke	Archdeacon of Llandaff; 1988–1991	Succeeded by David Lee
