= William Bruce Knight =

Dean of Llandaff, Wales (1786–1845)

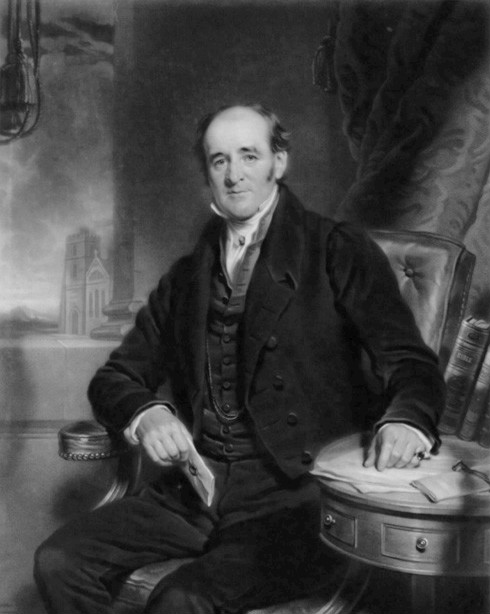
Bruce Knight in 1834

William Bruce Knight (baptised 31 December 1785 – 8 August 1845) was an Anglican cleric who was Dean of Llandaff from 1843 until his death.

== Life ==
Bruce Knight was born in Braunton, Devon, to John Knight and his wife, Margaret Bruce. He was named after an elder brother who was born in 1782 and lived only four months. When he was young, the family moved to Llanblethian in the Vale of Glamorgan. He was educated at Cowbridge Grammar School and Sherborne. He studied at Exeter College, Oxford. He held incumbencies at Llantrithyd and Margam; and was a Prebendary of Llandaff Cathedral; and, from 1825, its Chancellor.

His brother James Knight-Bruce was a British barrister, known as a judge and politician.

== Works ==
Bruce Knight wrote:

- Remarks Historical and Philological on the Welsh Language
- A Critical Review of John Jones' Reply

He was one of the editors of the 1841 revised version of the Welsh Book of Common Prayer.

Church of England titles
Preceded by John Probyn	Dean of Llandaff; 1843–1845	Succeeded by William Conybeare
