= Peggy Jackson =

Welsh archdeacon

Frances Anne "Peggy" Jackson (born 1951) was Archdeacon of Llandaff from 2009 to 2021.

She was educated at Somerville College, Oxford and became a chartered accountant. She was ordained deacon in 1987 and priest in 1994. After a curacy in Ilkeston she held incumbencies in Hemel Hempstead and Mortlake until her appointment as Archdeacon. She was collated on 31 May 2009. She retired on 31 July 2021.

Church in Wales titles
Preceded by Bill Thomas	Archdeacon of Llandaff; 2009–2021	Succeeded by Rod Green
