= The Fall of Doctor Onslow =

1994 novel by Frances Vernon

- First edition
- Author: Frances Vernon
- Language: English
- Genre: Novel
- Publisher: André Deutsch
- Publication date: 16 June 1994
- Publication place: United Kingdom
- Media type: Print (Hardback)
- Pages: 218 pp
- ISBN: 0-233-98875-0
- OCLC: 30862993

The Fall of Doctor Onslow is a novel by Frances Vernon, published in 1994. Many of its characters are loosely based on real people, sometimes with names changed.

== Plot summary ==
The story begins in 1858 at Charton School, a fictional English public school (i.e. secondary boys’ private school in North American usage) where Dr. George Onslow, a clergyman of great note, is headmaster. Onslow is credited with having turned around the previously poor reputation of the school: it is now seen as a very successful institution. But Onslow has a secret: he is sexually attracted to many of the pupils and has had affairs with several of them. There is also much homosexual behaviour amongst the boys themselves, a situation that may be due to Onslow's relatively permissive attitude.

The plot of the story begins to unfold when one of Onslow's young lovers—Arthur Bright—reveals his affair with the headmaster to another pupil, Christian Anstey-Ward, an idealistic young man who admires the ancient Greek ideal of Platonic love between males. Christian is shocked and incredulous, but is forced to believe Arthur when the latter gives him a passionate letter indiscreetly written to him by Onslow. Christian leaves Charton that year, still in possession of the letter. The following Summer he has a homosexual experience with a boy a little younger than himself and the guilt and self-doubt precipitated by this event prompts him to consider whether he should break Arthur‘s confidence and reveal Onslow‘s secret. While on holiday in Europe, he describes the whole affair in a letter to his father. The rest of the novel relates how the latter is able to use this information to exert a powerful hold on Onslow, which radically affects not only his career, but also his personal relationships and inner life.

== Allusions to actual history, geography, and current science ==
In an author's note, Frances Vernon explains that she based the central plot on events surrounding the resignation of Charles John Vaughan, Headmaster of Harrow School 1844-59, as recounted in the memoirs of John Addington Symonds, though she adds that many of the characters have undergone considerable elaboration or, in some cases, total invention. A side-plot involves the famous 1860 Oxford evolution debate between Thomas Huxley and Samuel Wilberforce concerning Charles Darwin's theory of evolution.

== Development of the novel ==
The Fall of Doctor Onslow was Frances Vernon’s last novel. The first version, entitled A School Story, was turned down by Gollancz, who had published her previous novel The Marquis of Westmarch. She reluctantly rewrote it and a few months after her death, Michael Marten, who had been her literary adviser, sent the rewritten version back to Gollancz, but it was again turned down. Marten then sent the book to about twenty more publishers, including André Deutsch, who agreed to publish it. It finally appeared in 1994, three years after Vernon's death.

== Critical response ==
In the Times Ben Preston called it ‘a searing indictment of the process of education … tersely written in a style that successfully captures Victorian restraint and its stifling sensibilities’. Jill Delay remarked in the Tablet that ‘it is difficult to believe when reading it that the author was a child of our times and did not actually live in the middle of the [nineteenth] century: she recreates that world so vividly, with such understanding of its characters, such an ear for its speech, such feeling for its attitudes and taboos.’ Lucasta Miller for the Independent described it as ‘both a tragic reminder of what she might have gone on to do, and a testimony to what she did achieve.’

== Sources ==
- Vernon, Frances (2014). Privileged Children. London: Faber & Faber (first published by Michael Joseph, 1982). ISBN 978-0-571-32078-3.
