= John Griffiths (archdeacon of Llandaff) =

Welsh archdeacon (1820–1897)

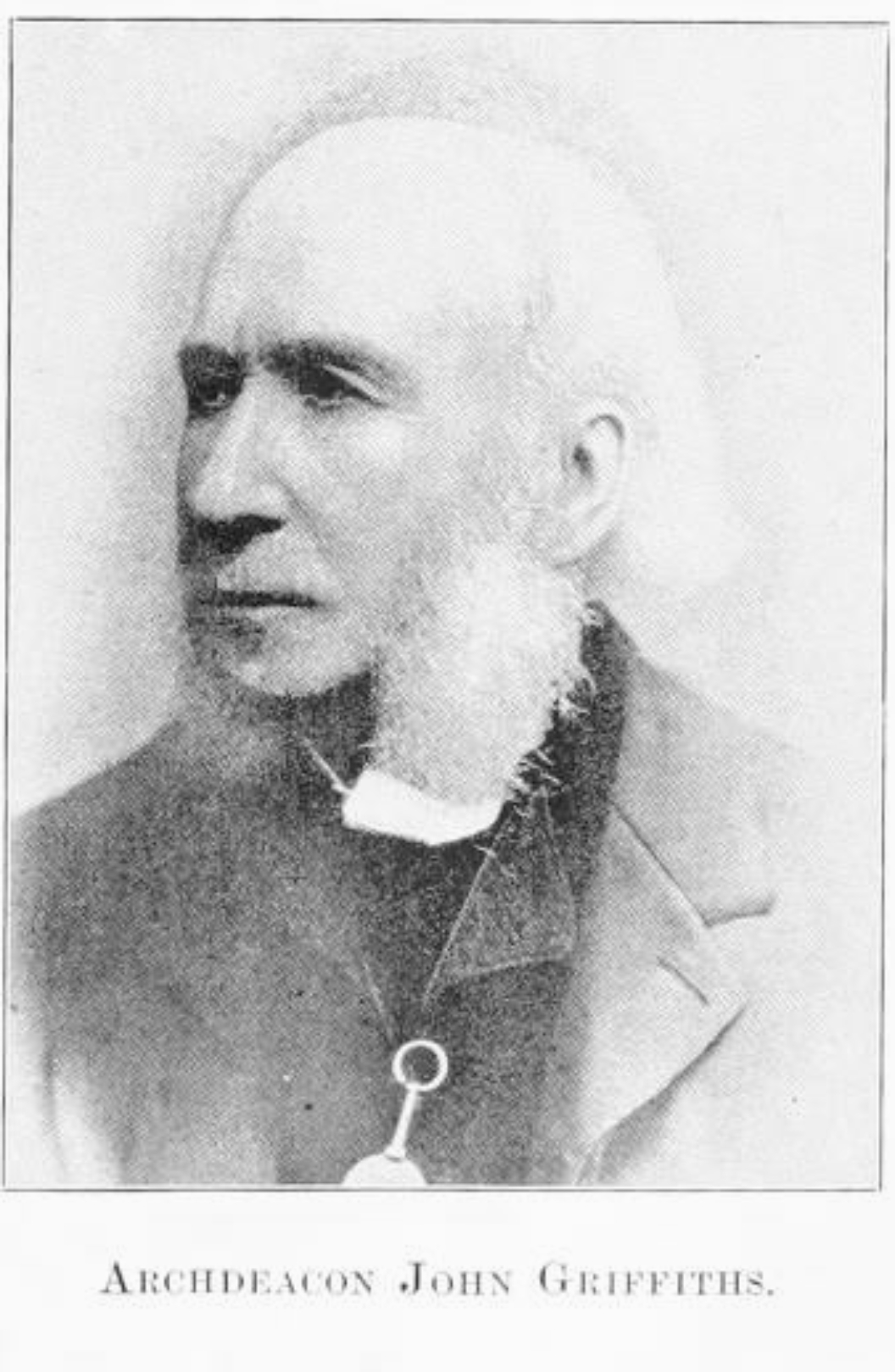
John Griffiths (Archdeacon of Llandaf)

The Venerable John Griffiths, BD (1820 – 1 September 1897), Rector of Neath, was Archdeacon of Llandaff from 1877 to 1897.

He was educated at St David's College, Lampeter. A past Headmaster of Cardigan Grammar School he was six times President of the National Eisteddfod of Wales.

Church in Wales titles
Preceded by Henry Lynch Blosse	Archdeacon of Llandaff; 1897–1897	Succeeded by Frederic Edmondes
