= Margaret Grey Porter =

Irish philanthropist

- Born: Margaret Lavinia Lindsey; County Mayo
- Died: 1881; Clogher Park, County Fermanagh
- Notable work: development and establishment of Carrickmacross lace

Margaret Grey Porter (died 1881) was an Irish philanthropist who developed and established Carrickmacross lace.

== Life ==
Margaret Grey Porter was born Margaret Lavinia Lindsey the eldest daughter of gentleman, Thomas Lindsey, and the daughter of Charles Bingham, 1st Earl of Lucan, Lady Margaret. She had 3 brothers and 4 sisters. She married Reverend John Grey Porter (1789–1871) in 1816. He was the rector of Kilskeery, County Monaghan from 1814 to 1871. John Grey Porter was the son of the bishop of Clogher, John Porter. There were a very wealthy family, with John Grey Porter donating large amounts of the Church of Ireland.

Soon after their marriage, the couple visited Italy. While there, Porter bought samples of Italian appliqué work, and upon their return to Kilskeery, she set about studying how to recreate the work with her maid, Ann Steadman. The new lace the women developed garnered interest with its artistic designs. From around 1820 the women taught local women and girls the lace making skill, from patterns they developed. The resulting lace, Carrickmacross lace, was successful with the local women earning extra income through their lace making. When Porter and her husband left the area, the teaching was taken up by two Misses Reid of Rahans, and later Tristram Kennedy.

Her husband bought the Belleville estate and Belmore lands in County Fermanagh in 1830. He later bought the Clogher episcopal palace, renamed Clogher Park, in 1850. After her husband's death, Porter lived at Clogher Park until her death in 1881. By the 1870s the Porter family owned 20,000 acres. The Porters had one son, John Grey Vesey Porter, and 6 daughters.
