= Frederick Worsley =

Dean of Llandaff, Wales (1873–1956)

Frederick William Worsley (1873–1956) was Dean of Llandaff from 1926 until 1929.

== Biography ==
Worsley was born in Singapore and educated at Brighton College, King's College, London (AKC), University College, Durham (MA, DD) and Clare College, Cambridge (MA). He was ordained in 1897. After curacies in Barnes and South Kensington, he was Vicar of Corringham. He was on the staff of St Michael's College, Llandaff, from 1914 to 1926, during which period he was also a Chaplain to the Forces from 1915 to 1919. He was interviewed on 29 October 1915 and was described as married with 5 children and medically fit for service at home and abroad. In November 1915, he was posted to France and attached to a Casualty Clearing Station. He was ill with trench fever in August 1916 but returned to duty one month later, serving in England, in France with the British Red Cross and in Italy. In 1919, he was promoted from 4th to 3rd Class and, from 1921, was an Honorary 4th Class chaplain. In June 1930 he availed himself of the provisions of the Clerical Disabilities Act 1870 (33 & 34 Vict. c. 91). He was the father of T C Worsley.

== Publications ==
- The Apocalypse of Jesus: Being a Step in the Search for the Historical Christ (1912)
- The Theology of the Church of England (1913)

Church of England titles
Preceded by Charles Griffith	Dean of Llandaff; 1926–1929	Succeeded by Garfield Williams
