= Cadwalader Hughes =

Welsh anglican priest

Cadwalader Hughes was a Welsh Anglican priest in the late 16th and early 17th centuries.

Hughes was educated at Balliol College, Oxford. He held livings at Heathfield, Bridgwater, Skilgate and Milverton. He was Archdeacon of Llandaff from 1601 to 1616.
