= William Watts (priest) =

Welsh Anglican priest (1667–1722)

William Watts (b Much Marcle 14 March 1667; d Abbey Dore 15 October 1722) was a Welsh Anglican priest in the 18th century.

Watts was educated at Brasenose College, Oxford. He graduated B.A. in 1666, M.A. in 1669, and B.D. in 1676. Watts became Rector of Abbey Dore in1677; a Canon of Hereford Cathedral in 1677; Precentor of Hereford in 1686; and Archdeacon of Llandaff in 1707.
