= Thomas Williams (dean of Llandaff) =

Welsh Anglican priest (died 1877)

Williams in 1857

Thomas Williams (died 24 April 1877) was a Welsh Anglican priest in the mid-nineteenth century.

Williams was born at Llanvapley and educated at Oriel College, Oxford. He held incumbencies at Llanddewi Skirrid then Llanvapley from 1859 to 1880. He was Archdeacon of Llandaff from 1843 to 1857 and Dean of Llandaff from 1857 until 1877.

Church of England titles
Preceded by John Probyn	Archdeacon of Llandaff; 1843–1857	Succeeded by James Colquhoun Campbell
Preceded by William Conybeare	Dean of Llandaff; 1857–1877	Succeeded by Henry Lynch Blosse
