= Thomas Prichard =

Thomas Prichard or Tom Prichard may refer to:

- Thomas Prichard (priest, born c. 1591), Welsh clergyman and academic at the University of Oxford
- Thomas Prichard (priest, born 1577), Archdeacon of Llandaff
- Thomas Prichard (priest, born 1910) (1910–1975), Archdeacon of Maidstone, 1968–72
- Thomas Octavius Prichard (1808–1847), English psychiatrist
- Tom Prichard (born 1959), American professional wrestler and author

== See also ==
- Thomas Pritchard (disambiguation)
