= Jason Bray =

Welsh Anglican priest (born 1969)

The Very Reverend Dr Jason Bray
- Dean of Llandaff
- Church: Church in Wales
- Diocese: Llandaff
- In office: September 2024 – present
- Predecessor: Richard Peers

Orders
- Ordination: 1997 (deacon); 1998 (priest)

Personal details
- Born: Jason Stephen Bray; 16 April 1969 (age 57) Merthyr Tydfil
- Denomination: Anglicanism
- Education: Durham University; Fitzwilliam College, Cambridge

Jason Stephen Bray (born 16 April 1969) is a Welsh Anglican priest. Since 2024, he has served as Dean of Llandaff.

== Life and career ==
Bray was born on 16 April 1969 in Merthyr Tydfil. He was educated at Cyfarthfa High School, and studied theology at Durham University, graduating BA in 1990. He then studied at Fitzwilliam College, Cambridge, obtaining his doctorate in 1996, with a thesis titled "The Danite cultic legend in its Ancient Near Eastern context: a study of Judges 17-18". From 1997 to 1999, he served as curate at St Mary, Abergavenny, before becoming a minor canon of Newport Cathedral in 1999. In 2002, he became vicar of Blaenavon with Capel Newydd, and in 2015 he became vicar of St Giles' Church, Wrexham.

After his appointment as Dean of Llandaff was announced on 7 April 2024, he was installed as Dean on 8 September.

He has been featured in the news as a deliverance minister, and in 2020 published a book about his life and experiences in this role, Deliverance: Everyday Investigations into Poltergeists, Ghosts and Other Supernatural Phenomena.

Church in Wales titles
Preceded by Richard Peers	Dean of Llandaff; 2024–	Incumbent
