= John Clegge =

17th century Anglican priest

John Clegge was an Anglican priest in the first half of the 17th century.

Clegge was educated at the University of Oxford. He held livings at Llangibby and Llansoy from 1601 to 1607. He became Archdeacon of Llandaff in 1646.
