= Lewis Clarke (priest) =

Welsh archdeacon

Herbert Lewis Clarke was Archdeacon of Llandaff from 1977 to 1988.

Clarke was born in 1920 and educated at Jesus College, Oxford; and ordained in 1946. After a curacy in Llanelly he was a Lecturer at Wells Theological College, St David's College, Lampeter and Bishop's University, Lennoxville. He was Sub-Warden of St. Michael's College, Llandaff from 1959 to 1967 and then the incumbent at Caerphilly until his appointment as Archdeacon.

Church in Wales titles
Preceded by Alun Radcliffe Davies	Archdeacon of Llandaff; 1977–1988	Succeeded by Albert John Francis Lewis
