= Gordon Phillips (priest) =

Anglican priest and author (1911–1982)

Gordon Lewis Phillips (27 June 1911 – 5 December 1982) was an Anglican priest and author.

Phillips was educated at The Cathedral School, Llandaff, Dean Close School and Brasenose College, Oxford. He was ordained in 1938. After a curacy at St Julian, Newport, he was Rector of Northolt from 1940 to 1955 and Bloomsbury from 1956 to 1968. He was Dean of Llandaff from 1968 until 1971, then Gresham Professor of Divinity from 1967 until 1969, and from 1971 until 1973.

Church of England titles
| Preceded by Eryl Thomas | Dean of Llandaff; 1968–1971 | Succeeded by John Williams |
