= Garfield Williams =

Anglican priest (1881–1960)

Garfield Hodder Williams OBE (21 November 1881 – 8 August 1960) was an eminent Anglican Priest in the second quarter of the 20th century.

Born into an eminent publishing family in Bromley on 21 November 1881, he was educated at the City of London School and Barts. Eschewing a medical career he undertook missionary work at home and abroad before being ordained in 1914.

After this he was Principal of St Andrew's College, Gorakhpur. He was appointed an Officer of the Order of the British Empire in the 1919 New Year Honours for his services as editor of the War Journal while living in the United Provinces during the First World War.

He returned to England following the war and was an Assistant Master at Rugby School. He was Secretary of the Missionary Council of the National Church Assembly from 1924 to 1929 when he was appointed Dean of Llandaff. Two years later he became Dean of Manchester. He died on 8 August 1960.

== Notes ==
Church of England titles
| Preceded by Frederick Worsley | Dean of Llandaff; 1929 – 1931 | Succeeded by David Jones |
| Preceded by Hewlett Johnson | Dean of Manchester; 1931 – 1948 | Succeeded by Leonard Wilson |
