= William Davey =

Dean of Llandaff, Wales (1825–1917)

William Davey

William Davey (28 July 1825, Thorpe, Norwich – 26 March 1917, Llandaff) was Dean of Llandaff from 1897 until 1913.

Davey was educated at Charterhouse and Lincoln College, Oxford. He was a Master at Marlborough College before becoming a tutor of Chichester Theological College, then Cuddeson, and finally St David's College, Lampeter. He was a Prebendary of St David's Cathedral from 1876 until 1895; and Examining Chaplain to the Bishop of Llandaff from 1895 to 1905.

Church of England titles
Preceded by Eryl Thomas	Dean of Llandaff; 1968–1971	Succeeded by John Williams
