= Richard Peers =

British Anglican priest

The Very Reverend Richard Peers
- Dean of Llandaff
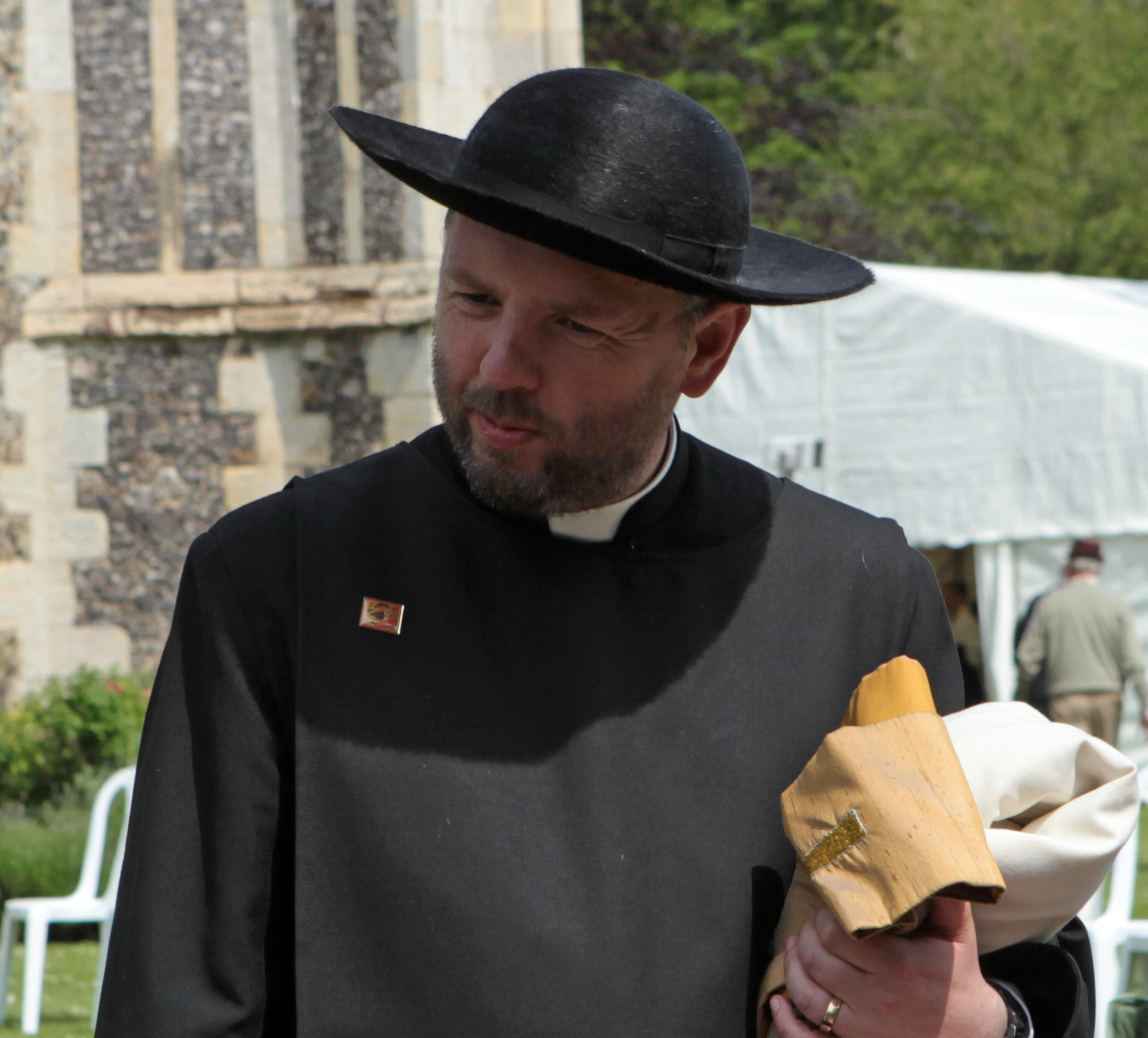
- Peers in 2014
- Church: Church in Wales
- Diocese: Llandaff
- In office: November 2022 – March 2024
- Predecessor: Gerwyn Capon
- Successor: Jason Bray
- Previous post: Sub-dean of Christ Church Cathedral, Oxford (2020–2022)

Orders
- Ordination: 1993 (deacon); 1994 (priest)

Personal details
- Born: Richard Charles Peers; July 1965 (age 61)
- Denomination: Anglicanism

Richard Charles Peers (born July 1965) is a British Anglican priest. Between 2022 and 2024, he served as Dean of Llandaff.

== Life and career ==
The Very Reverend Richard Charles Peers was born in July 1965. He is a British Anglican priest who most recently served as the Dean of Llandaff from November 2022 until his retirement in April 2024.

He trained and worked as a teacher before being ordained in 1993. He later served as the Head Teacher of Trinity Church of England School, Lewisham. He served as curate at St Hilda's, Grangetown, and was made deacon at Petertide 1993, by John Habgood, Archbishop of York, at York Minster, before being ordained priest the following Petertide (4 July 1994), by Gordon Bates, Bishop of Whitby, at St Hilda's. After serving in parishes in the Dioceses of York, Portsmouth, Lichfield, and Southwark, he spent time as the Director of Education for the Diocese of Liverpool and served as the CEO of the Liverpool Diocesan Schools Trust.

Appointed in May 2020, he served as the Sub-Dean and residentiary Canon of Christ Church Cathedral, Oxford., where he oversaw cathedral livings, chaired the Cathedral School, and provided pastoral support.

After his appointment as Dean of Llandaff was announced in September 2022, he was installed as Dean of Llandaff on 20 November.

In March 2024, Peers was cleared of misconduct charges brought under the Clergy Discipline Measure (CDM). The allegations were related to statements he was accused of making regarding the former Dean of Christ Church, Dr. Martyn Percy. Ten days after being exonerated by the Diocese of Oxford Disciplinary Tribunal, Peers announced his retirement during Easter Sunday services on March 31, 2024, noting that the time was right to step down following the resolution of the saga.

He lives with his husband, Jim, who is a garden writer.

Church in Wales titles
Preceded by Gerwyn Capon	Dean of Llandaff; 2022–2024	Succeeded by Jason Bray
