= Bill Thomas (priest) =

Archdeacon of Llandaff, Wales

William Phillip Thomas was Archdeacon of Llandaff from 1998 to 2008.

Thomas was born in 1943 and educated at Lichfield Theological College; and ordained in 1971. After curacies in Llanilid and Pontypridd he was Vicar of Tonyrefail then Rector of Neath until his appointment as Archdeacon.

Church in Wales titles
Preceded by David Lee	Archdeacon of Llandaff; 1998–2008	Succeeded by Peggy Jackson
