= John Porter (bishop) =

Anglican bishop (1751–1819)

John Porter (1751 – 27 July 1819) was an 18th-century Anglican bishop in Ireland.

Porter was the son of Rev. Thomas Porter, perpetual curate of Northenden. He was educated at Manchester Grammar School and Trinity College, Cambridge, matriculating in 1768, graduating B.A. (5th wrangler) 1773, M.A. 1776, D.D. (per lit. reg.) 1792.

He was ordained deacon on 6 June 1773 and priest on 18 December 1774 (both ordinations performed by John Hinchliffe, Bishop of Peterborough and Master of Trinity College), and became a Fellow of Trinity College in 1774. He was Boyle Lecturer in 1786, and Regius Professor of Hebrew from 1790 to 1795.

He was appointed Archdeacon of Llandaff in 1789. Moving to Ireland as chaplain to Lord Lieutenant Earl Camden, he was nominated Bishop of Killala and Achonry on 6 May 1795 and consecrated on 7 June 1795 that year. He was translated to Clogher on 30 December 1797 and died in office on 27 July 1819.

== Family ==
On 3 December 1784, Porter married Mary Smith, daughter of Joseph Smith of Coltishall, Norfolk (and niece of the Cambridge astronomer and academic John Smith). They had the following children:

- Rev. John Grey Porter (1789–1873), married Margaret Lavinia Lindsey in 1816.
- Commodore Thomas Porter, R.N.
- Rev. Charles Porter (1796–1877), married Penelope Fleetwood in 1827.
- Major-General Henry Edward Porter (1801–1871).
- Captain William Henry Porter (1802–1887), married Elizabeth Gibbs Ludlow in 1830.
- Margaret Porter (died 1859), married Hugh Harris.
- Elizabeth Porter, married Lieutenant-Colonel John O'Ferrall Carmichael (son of Lieutenant-General Sir Hugh Lyle Carmichael).

Religious titles
Preceded by John Law	Bishop of Killala and Achonry; 1795–1797	Succeeded by Joseph Stock
Preceded by William Foster	Bishop of Clogher; 1797–1819	Succeeded by Lord John Beresford
