= Frances Vernon =

British novelist

- Born: Georgina Frances Vernon; 1 December 1963
- Died: 11 July 1991 (aged 27)
- Occupation: Novelist
- Education: New Hall, Cambridge (now Murray Edwards College, Cambridge)
- Genre: Literary fiction

Frances Vernon (1 December 1963 – 11 July 1991) was a British novelist. She was the daughter of the tenth Baron Vernon.

== Novels ==
Vernon was encouraged in her writing by her first cousin, the photographer and author Michael Marten. She wrote her first novel Privileged Children (1982) at the age of sixteen. It won the Authors' Club Best First Novel Award. She studied briefly at New Hall, Cambridge (now Murray Edwards College, Cambridge) but soon left to continue her writing. She produced five more novels: Gentlemen and Players (1984), The Bohemian Girl (1985), A Desirable Husband (1987), The Marquis of Westmarch (1989) and finally The Fall of Doctor Onslow (1994), which was published three years after her death. Lucasta Miller for the Independent described it as "both a tragic reminder of what she might have gone on to do, and a testimony to what she did achieve".

== Depression and suicide ==
Vernon suffered from depression, which worsened towards the end of her life. She was seeing a psychotherapist for about five years before her death. She suffered in particular from a fear of travelling. Vernon committed suicide on 11 July 1991. She had promised her psychiatrist not to use the pills he had prescribed her for her depression but instead used her own "herbal" concoction.

== Sources ==
- Vernon, Frances (2014). Privileged Children. London: Faber & Faber (first published by Michael Joseph, 1982). ISBN 978-0-571-32078-3.
- Vernon, Frances (1994). The Fall of Doctor Onslow. London: Andre Deutsch. ISBN 0-233-98875-0.
