= John Fulham =

English priest (1699–1777)

John Fulham M.A. (1699–1777) was an English cleric, Canon of Windsor from 1750 to 1777 and Archdeacon of Llandaff from 1749 to 1777

== Career ==
He was educated at Eton College and Christ Church, Oxford where he graduated B.A. in 1720.

He was appointed:

- Rector of Compton 1722–1777
- Rector of Merrow 1736–1752
- Prebendary of Chichester Cathedral 1745–1773
- Chaplain to the Speaker of the House of Commons 1746
- Archdeacon of Llandaff 1749–1777
- Vicar of All Saints’ Church, Isleworth 1751–1777

He was appointed to the seventh stall in St George's Chapel, Windsor Castle in 1750, and held the stall until 1777.

John Fulham died on 13 July 1777; a monumental inscription to him survives at Compton.
