= Warren Sach =

Former United Nations official

- Born: Warren Edward Sach; 1946 (age 79–80); Essex, England

Warren Edward Sach (born 1946) occupied various executive roles at the United Nations, retiring in 2013 as Assistant Secretary-General for Central Support Services.

== Education ==
Sach was educated at University College London (BSc in Economics), and Magdalene College, Cambridge (post-graduate diploma in Development Economics).

== Career ==
Sach has served the United Nations in a variety of positions. Earlier in his career, from October 1968 to September 1970, he worked as a Junior Professional Officer with the United Nations Development Programme (UNDP) in Kenya. From May 1974, he became first as a Recruitment Officer and later as a Budget Officer at United Nations Environment Programme (UNEP) headquarters, Nairobi, Kenya.

Between May 1979 and October 1988, Sach served in the Budget Division as a Budget Officer. Later on, he became Chief of the Data Analysis and Systems Control Unit.

Sach was the Chief of the Salaries and Allowance Division of the International Civil Service Commission (ICSC) from 1988 to 1995. In 1996, he was appointed as Deputy Director of the Programme Planning and Budget Division. He was Director of the same Division from 1997 to March 2005. In April 2005, he was appointed United Nations Controller at the level of Assistant Secretary-General.

From 2005 to 2008, he was Assistant Secretary-General and Controller of the United Nations.

He became representative of the Secretary-General for the investments of the assets of the United Nations Joint Staff Pension Fund in 2006, a position he will keep concurrently to his other responsibilities until 2013. (2006-2013) and as the Assistant Secretary-General/controller of the United Nations (2005-2008).

He was appointed as United Nations Assistant Secretary-General for Central Support Services in 2008 and kept the position until his retirement in 2013.

After retirement, Sach took various board positions at the Association of Former International Civil Servants (AFICS/NY), the Federation of Associations of Former International Civil Servants (FAFICS), and the UN Joint Staff Pension Board.
