= Roger Morris (engineer) =

Roger Brian Morris (19 March 1933 – 15 June 2001) was a pioneer in railway engineering, having helped develop the rail system for the Channel Tunnel, the hovertrain project as well as a number of the railway systems in Eastern Europe and South America.

Morris was born in Liverpool, England.

In his later years he became a fellow of Magdalene College, Cambridge. During those years he functioned as an assistant to students attending the college. His obituary in The Times described him as "a Cambridge don of an increasingly rare kind, concerned not just with academic results but the development of rounded personalities. A friendly uncle to waves of students...he taught not only engineering, but how to get the most out of the university, and out of life."
