= Dean of Llandaff =

Office in the Church of Wales

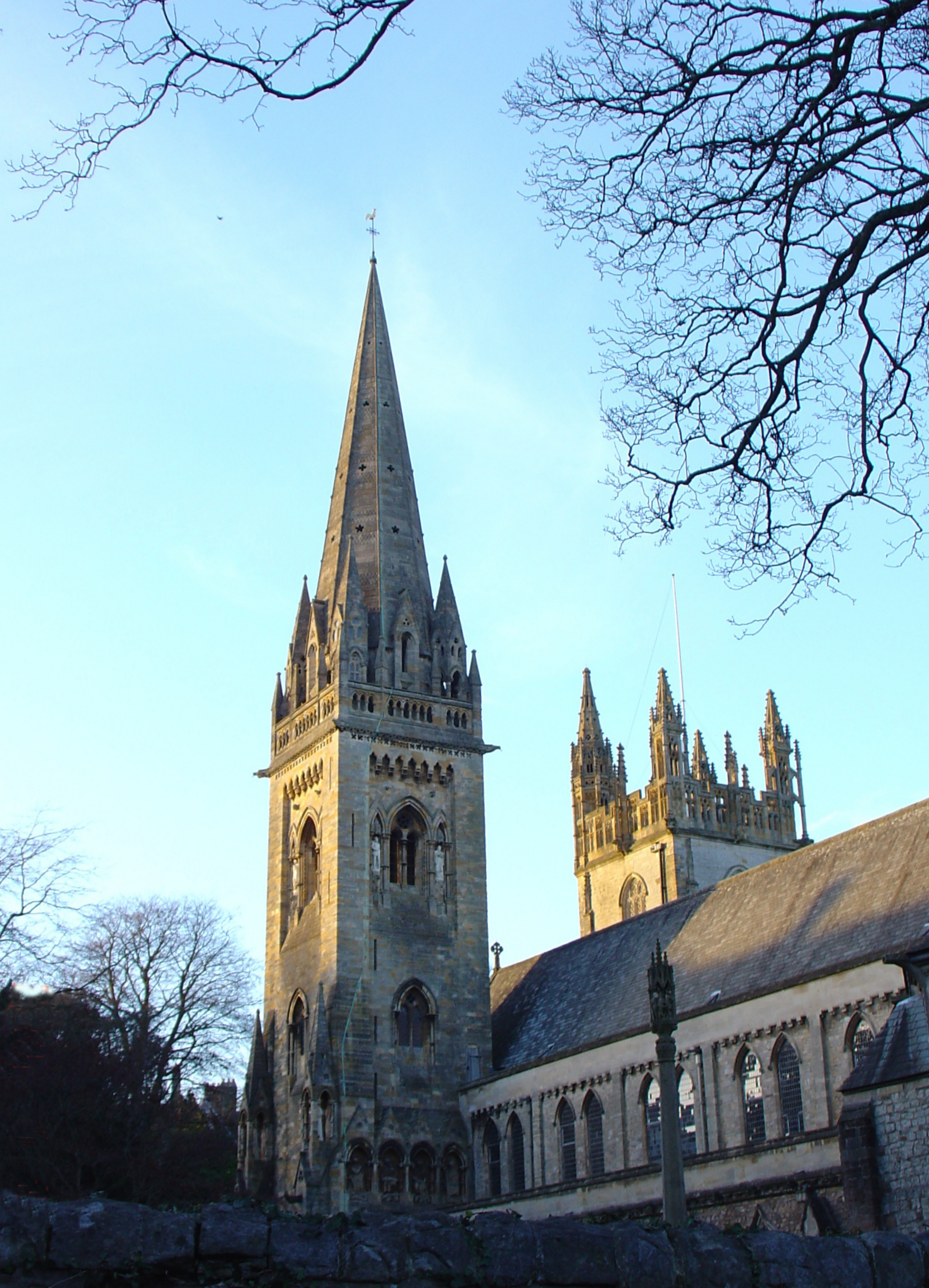
Llandaff cathedral

Dean of Llandaff is the title given to the head of the chapter of Llandaff Cathedral, which is located in Llandaff, Cardiff, Wales. It is not an ancient office – the head of the chapter was historically the Archdeacon who appears in this role in the Liber Landavensis and in the Chapter Acts preserved in the Glamorgan Records Office – but the office of a separate Dean was established by act of parliament in 1843. A century later, the Deanery was merged with the Vicarage of Llandaff. The Chapter forfeited its legal rights on Disestablishment in 1920, when the Dean and Chapter as an ecclesiastical corporation was dissolved, under the terms of the Welsh Church Act 1914. There continues, however, to be a Dean and Chapter under the scheme or constitution made under the Constitution of the Church in Wales.

== Deans of Llandaff ==
- 1840–1843 John Probyn (archdeacon and dean)
- 1843–1845 William Bruce Knight
- 1845–1857 William Conybeare
- 1857–1877 Thomas Williams
- 1877–1879 Henry Lynch Blosse
- 1879–1897 Charles Vaughan
- 1897–1913 William Davey
- 1913–1926 Charles Edward Thomas Griffith
- 1926–1929 Frederick Worsley
- 1929–1931 Garfield Williams (afterwards Dean of Manchester)
- 1931–1948 David John Jones
- 1948–1953 Glyn Simon (afterwards Bishop of Swansea and Brecon, 1953, Bishop of Llandaff, 1957, and Archbishop of Wales, 1968)
- 1954–1968 Eryl Thomas (afterwards Bishop of Monmouth, 1968, and Bishop of Llandaff, 1970)
- 1968–1971 Gordon Phillips
- 1971–1977 John Williams
- 1977–1993 Alun Davies
- 1993–2000 John Rogers
- 2000–2012 John Lewis
- 2013 Janet Henderson
- 2014–2022 Gerwyn Capon
- 2022–2024 Richard Peers
- 2024–present Jason Bray

== Bibliography ==
- Phyllis Grosskurth, John Addington Symons, a Biography, 1964
- Owain W. Jones, Glyn Simon, His Life and Opinions, 1981
- Portrait of the geologist William Daniel Conybeare (1787–1857): Gathering the Jewels
