= Richard Jones (bishop) =

Welsh Anglican priest

Richard William Jones was an eminent Welsh Anglican priest.

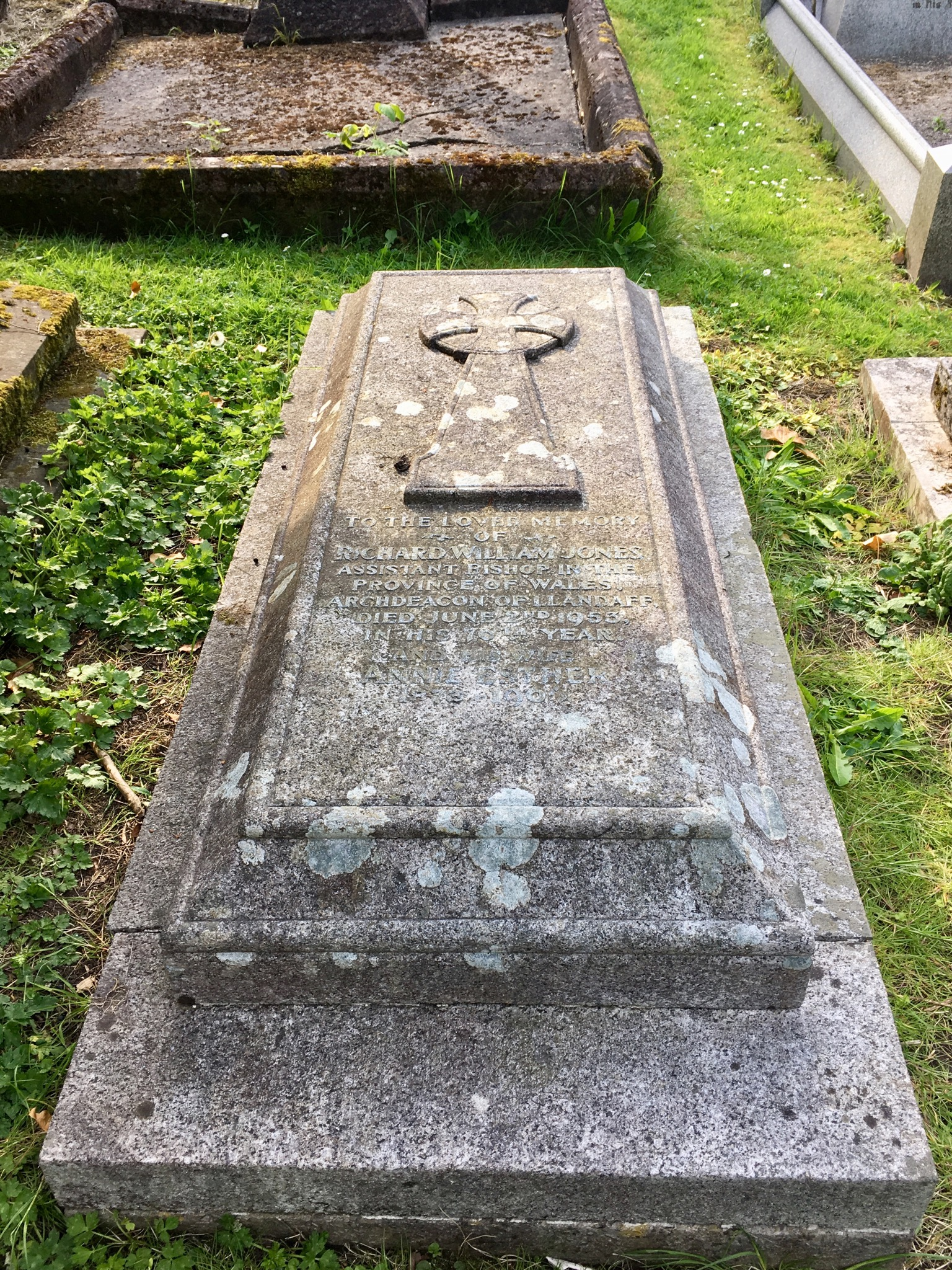
Jones's grave in the churchyard of Llandaff Cathedral, May 2020

He was educated at the University of Wales and St. Michael's College, Llandaff and ordained in 1904. After curacies in Aberdare and Cutcombe, he held incumbencies in Oystermouth, Gorseinon (Vicar of St Catherine's, 1914–18), Llangynidr (Rector, 1919–25), Bishopston (Rector, 1925–27), Neath with LLantwit (Rector, 1936–38) and Peterston-super-Ely (Rector, 1938 – his death). He was also Diocesan Missioner for Llandaff (1927–36), an honorary canon of Llandaff Cathedral (1929–35), a canon of Llandaff (1935–38), Archdeacon of Llandaff from 1938, and an Assistant Bishop to the Archbishop of Wales from 1946. He was consecrated into bishop's orders on the Feast of St Peter (29 June 1946) at St Davids Cathedral.

He died on 2 June 1953 at Peterston.

Church in Wales titles
Preceded by John James	Archdeacon of Llandaff; 1938–1953	Succeeded by Gwynno James
