= Archdeacon of Llandaff =

Office in the Church in Wales

The Archdeacon of Llandaff is a senior ecclesiastical officer in the Church in Wales Diocese of Llandaff. The archdeacon is the senior priest with responsibility over the area of the archdeaconry of Llandaff, one of two archdeaconries in the diocese (the other is Margam). The archdeaconry of Llandaff currently consists of two large deaneries: Cardiff, and Eglwysilan.

== History ==
The first recorded archdeacons of Llandaff occur soon after the Norman Conquest. However, no territorial titles are recorded until after c. 1125. Until 1843, when the separate position of Dean of Llandaff was created, the Archdeacon also performed the duties of cathedral dean.

== List of archdeacons of Llandaff ==
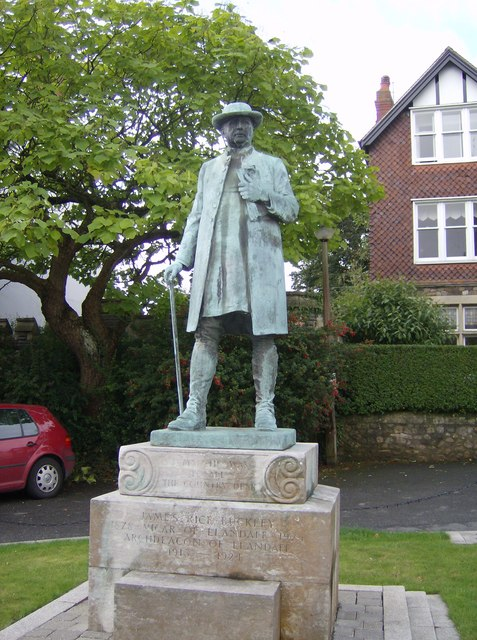
James Rice Buckley, Archdeacon of Llandaff, 1913–24 (Cathedral Green, Cardiff)

- Leofric
- 1059-1104 Abraham
- Urban I
- 1126 Uhtred
- 1140–1148 Urban II
- c.1154–1159 Ralph
- 1165–1179 William
- 1172–1179 Urban III
- 1217–1242 Maurice
- 1243 Ralph of Newcastle
- 1244 Thomas, the king's chaplain
- 1260 Nicholas
- 1260–c1287 Simon of Radnor
- 1287 Robert de Briouze
- 1289 Henry de Cranborne or Wager
- 1290 Robert
- 1323,1337 Alexander de Monmouth
- 1338 Richard de Halton
- 1347 Thomas de Burgherssh
- ?–1361 John de Coventry
- 1361,1364 Henry Despenser
- 1361–1368 Robert de Walsham
- 1363–? Thomas Banastre of Eltisley
- 1366 Thomas de Southam
- 1368–? Richard Boule
- ?–1373 Thomas de Alston
- 1373–? John de Sulthorn
- 1385,1393 Robert de la More
- 1396–? Thomas Orewelle
- ?-1447 Robert Cole
- 1447–1454 John Stradling
- 1454–? Lewis Byford
- 1529,1541 John Quarre
- ?–1564 John Smith
- 27 April 1564 – 17 April 1571 Giles Langley
- 26 April 1571–? Lewis Baker
- 28 May 1596–? Morgan Roberts
- 6 May 1601 – 17 July 1606 Cadwalader Hughes
- 9 February 1607–December 1623 Robert Robotham
- 6 December 1623–? Francis Foxton
- 4 August 1626–May 1646 Thomas Prichard
- 1646–? John Clegge (Note: Note that source 9 and source 7 contradict each other on the matter of John Clegge being an Archdeacon. Source 7 states that the office was vacant from 1646-1660.)
- 16 October 1660 – 30 June 1666 Francis Davies (afterwards Bishop of Llandaff, 29 January 1667)
- 18 January 1668 Edward Gamage
- Edward Gamage Jnr
- Thomas Gamage
- 1686-1705 George Bull (afterwards Bishop of St David's, 1705)
- 1706-1722 William Watts
- 1722-1749 John Evans
- 1749–1777 John Fulham
- 1777–1789 William Adams
- 1789–? John Porter
- c.1796–1843 John Probyn (also Dean of Llandaff)
- 1843–1857 Thomas Williams (afterwards Dean of Llandaff, 1857)
- 1857–1859 James Colquhoun Campbell (afterwards Bishop of Bangor, 1859)
- 1859–?1877 Henry Lynch Blosse
- 1877-1897 John Griffiths
- 1897–1913 Frederic Edmondes
- 1913–1924 James Buckley
- 1924–1930 David Davies
- 1930–1938 John James
- 1938–1953 Richard Jones
- 1953–1964 Gwynno James (afterwards Dean of Brecon, 1964)
- 1965–1969 Thomas Hughes, Assistant Bishop
- 1969–1971 John Williams
- 1971–1977 Alun Davies (afterwards Dean of Llandaff, 1977)
- 1977–1988 Lewis Clarke
- 1988–1991 Albert Lewis
- 1991–1997 (ret.) David Lee
- 1998–2008 (ret.) Bill Thomas
- 31 May 2009 – July 2021 Peggy Jackson
- 5 September 2021 – present Rhod Green (previously called Rod)

Roderick Ernest Alexander Green (called Rhod since c. 2023; previously called Rod; born 1974) was collated Archdeacon of Llandaff on 5 September 2021. He trained for the ministry at Wycliffe Hall, Oxford and received ordination in the Church of England: he was made deacon at Petertide 2007 (30 June) — by Richard Chartres, Bishop of London, at St Paul's Cathedral — and ordained priest on 17 May 2008 — by Stephen Oliver, Bishop of Stepney, at St John-at-Hackney. He then served all his ministry in the Diocese of London prior to his archidiaconal collation: as curate at Christ Church, Spitalfields, Associate Vicar at St Paul's Church, Shadwell (an HTB church plant), and Vicar in Harrow as several churches there united as a "resource church".
