= Frederic Edmondes =

Welsh archdeacon (1840–1918)

The Ven. Frederic William Edmondes, MA (1840-1918) was Archdeacon of Llandaff from 1897 to 1913.

He was educated at Cowbridge Grammar School and Jesus College, Oxford; and ordained in 1865. After a curacy in Newcastle, Bridgend he was Rector of Michaelston-super-Ely from 1867 to 1873; and then of Coity until 1901. He died on 10 November 1918.

Church in Wales titles
| Preceded by John Griffiths | Archdeacon of Llandaff; 1913–1924 | Succeeded by James Rice Buckley |
