= John Williams (dean of Llandaff) =

Welsh Anglican priest (1907–1983)

John Frederick Williams (9 March 1907 – 1 September 1983) was a Welsh Anglican priest in the last third of the twentieth century. Williams was educated at Friars School, Bangor, and the University of Wales; and ordained in 1930. After curacies in Portmadoc and Aberdare he served incumbencies at Miskin, Skewen and Neath. He was Archdeacon of Llandaff from 1969 to 1971; and Dean of Llandaff from 1971 to 1977.

Church in Wales titles
Preceded by Thomas Hughes	Archdeacon of Llandaff; 1969–1971	Succeeded by Alun Davies
Preceded by Gordon Phillips	Dean of Llandaff; 1971–1977	Succeeded by Alun Davies
