= Thomas Prichard (priest, born 1577) =

Welsh Anglican priest (1577–1646)

Thomas Prichard (1577–1646) was a Welsh Anglican priest in the first half of the 17th century.

Prichard was born in Glamorgan educated at Hart Hall, Oxford. He was archdeacon of Llandaff from 1626 until his death.
