= History of Advertising Trust =

British advertising archive and charity

- Abbreviation: HAT
- Formation: 1976
- Type: Archive; registered charity
- Registration no.: 276194
- Location: Raveningham, Norfolk, England

The History of Advertising Trust (HAT) is a British archive and registered charity based in Raveningham, Norfolk, England. It holds records and other material relating to the history of advertising and marketing in the United Kingdom. The organisation was formed in 1976 and registered as a charity in 1978.

== History and collections ==
HAT was established as an archive for material connected with British advertising. John Philip Jones's reference work Advertising Organizations and Publications includes an entry on the History of Advertising Trust Archive.

The archive has also been used as a source for business and advertising history. In 2005, Stefan Schwarzkopf published an article in Business Archives on advertising-agency records and related material held by HAT.

== Ghostsigns Archive ==
In 2010, HAT launched the Ghostsigns Archive, a project documenting painted advertising signs on buildings in the United Kingdom. The Guardian reported that the project recorded more than 650 signs with contributions from photographers through the Ghostsigns Flickr group. A later Guardian article described the archive as containing about 600 examples from around the country.

== See also ==
- Advertising
- History of advertising
- Outdoor advertising
- Poster
- Television advertising
