= Matherne =

Matherne is a French surname. Notable people with the surname include:

- Beverly Matherne (born 1946), American writer and poet
- Samantha Matherne, American philosopher
- Wayne Matherne (born 1949), retired Canadian football player
- Brian Matherne, a coach in a sex abuse case in the archdiocese of Gregory Michael Aymond
- Ethel Jeanne Matherne (1916–2002), wife of educator and businessman Cliff Ammons
- Londa Jean Matherne, wife of Harry Connick Sr.
