= John Lewis (dean of Llandaff) =

Anglican priest (1947–2019)

John Thomas Lewis (1947 – 18 February 2019) was a Welsh Anglican priest who was Dean of Llandaff from 2000 to 2012.

== Life ==
Thomas was born in 1947 and educated at Dyffryn Grammar School before winning a scholarship to Jesus College, Oxford, where he studied mathematics. After obtaining his BA in 1969 and a diploma in applied statistics in 1970, he transferred to St John's College, Cambridge, where he studied theology in preparation for his ordination.

He was ordained deacon in 1973 and priest in 1974, serving initially as curate in Whitchurch and then in Lisvane before becoming chaplain at Cardiff University (1980–1985). He was appointed as vicar of St David's, Brecon, with Llanspyddid and Llanilltyd in 1985, moving to Bassaleg in 1991 before becoming Dean of Llandaff in 2000. In addition to his parish ministry, Lewis was secretary of the Provincial Selection Panel of the Church in Wales and chaplain for Continuing Ministerial Education for the Bishop of Monmouth. He retired as Dean & Vicar of Llandaff on 31 July 2012.

He died in 2019, aged 71.
