= Surrogate (clergy) =

A Surrogate (from Lat. surrogare, to substitute for), is the deputy of a bishop or an ecclesiastical judge, acting in the absence of his principal and strictly bound by the authority of the latter. It is particularly common as a term for clergy deputising for the diocesan judge in dioceses of the Church of England.

== History ==
Canon 128 of the 1603 canons of the Church of England lays down the qualifications necessary for the office of surrogate, and canon 123 specifies the regulations for appointment to the office.

== Current use ==
At present the chief duty of a surrogate in England is the granting of marriage licences, so that although often nominated by the bishop, the person appointed is in fact a surrogate to the Chancellor (chief judge) of the diocese. Surrogates may have more extensive delegated powers, and judgments of the Arches Court of Canterbury have been delivered by a surrogate in the absence of the official principal.

Surrogates are appointed by means of a legal commission issued by the Chancellor, which takes force after the new surrogate has sworn an oath. Upon appointment to the office "surrogate" becomes part of the holder's formal title. Thus the Rector of Sherborne (for example) upon taking up the office becomes known as Rector of Sherborne and Surrogate.

== See also ==
- Ecclesiology
