= Pembrokeshire Coast Path =

Hiking trail in Wales

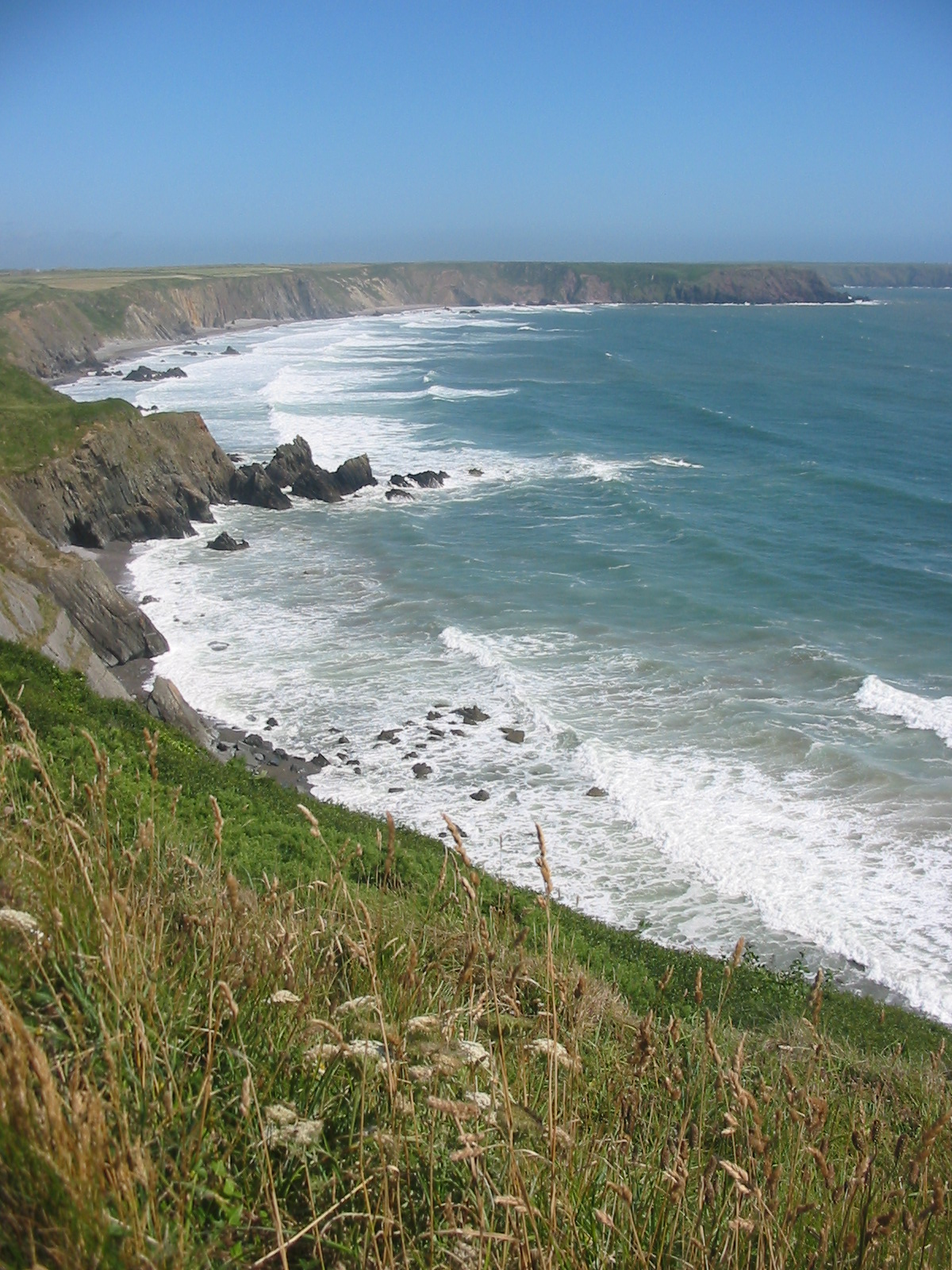
- View from the Pembrokeshire Coast Path on Marloes peninsula
- Length: 186 mi (299 km)
- Location: Wales
- Designation: UK National Trail
- Trailheads: Poppit Sands, near St Dogmaels, Ceredigion; 52.0891°N 4.6822°W; Amroth, Pembrokeshire; 51.7340°N 4.6477°W
- Use: Hiking
- Elevation change: 35,000 feet (11,000 m)
- Highest point: Pen yr afr, on Cemaes Head 175 metres (574 ft)
- Lowest point: Sandy Haven crossing, near Milford Haven 1.8 metres (6 ft)
- Season: All year

Map of Pembrokeshire, showing the Coastal Path (red) and National Park (green)

The Pembrokeshire Coast Path (Welsh: Llwybr Arfordir Sir Benfro), often called the Pembrokeshire Coastal Path, is a designated National Trail in Pembrokeshire, southwest Wales. Established in 1970, it is a 186-mile (299 km) long-distance walking route, mostly at cliff-top level, with a total of 35,000 feet (11,000 m) of ascent and descent. At its highest point – Pen yr afr, on Cemaes Head – it reaches a height of 574 feet (175 m), and at its lowest point – Sandy Haven crossing, near Milford Haven – it is just 6 feet (2 m) above low water. Whilst most of the coastline faces west, it offers – at varying points – coastal views in every direction of the compass.

The southern end of the path is at Amroth, Pembrokeshire. The northern end is often regarded as being at Poppit Sands, near St Dogmaels, Pembrokeshire, where the official plaque was originally sited but the path now continues to St Dogmaels, where a new marker was unveiled in July 2009. Here the path links with the Ceredigion Coast Path, which continues northwards.

The Pembrokeshire Coast Path forms part of the 870-mile (1,400 km) Wales Coast Path around the whole coast of Wales from Chepstow to the border with Chester, which was officially opened in 2012.

== History of the path ==
Following the establishment of the Pembrokeshire Coast National Park in 1952, Welsh naturalist and author Ronald Lockley surveyed a route around the coast. Although there were villages and settlements on the coast, communication between these was largely by boats, and access in the region was generally poor. Lockley's report for the Countryside Commission in 1953 was welcomed and broadly adopted. Some sections of the walk were existing rights-of-way, but the majority were in private hands, necessitating negotiation. Most landowners were in favour, and many benefitted from the erection of new fencing. Even today, however, the path in places detours from the obvious line where landowners were unwilling to accept a new right-of-way across their land.

Completion of the path took 17 years, and this work included the erection of more than 100 footbridges and 479 stiles, and the cutting of thousands of steps into steep or slippery sections. When opened by Wynford Vaughan-Thomas on 16 May 1970, the length of the path was given as 180 miles (290 km), but over the years there have been a number of Footpath Diversion Orders which have extended it to its current length of 186 miles (299 km).

Celebrations to mark the 50th anniversary of the path's opening were due to be held in May 2020, but were postponed because of the coronavirus pandemic, during which the public were asked not to use the path.

== Description ==
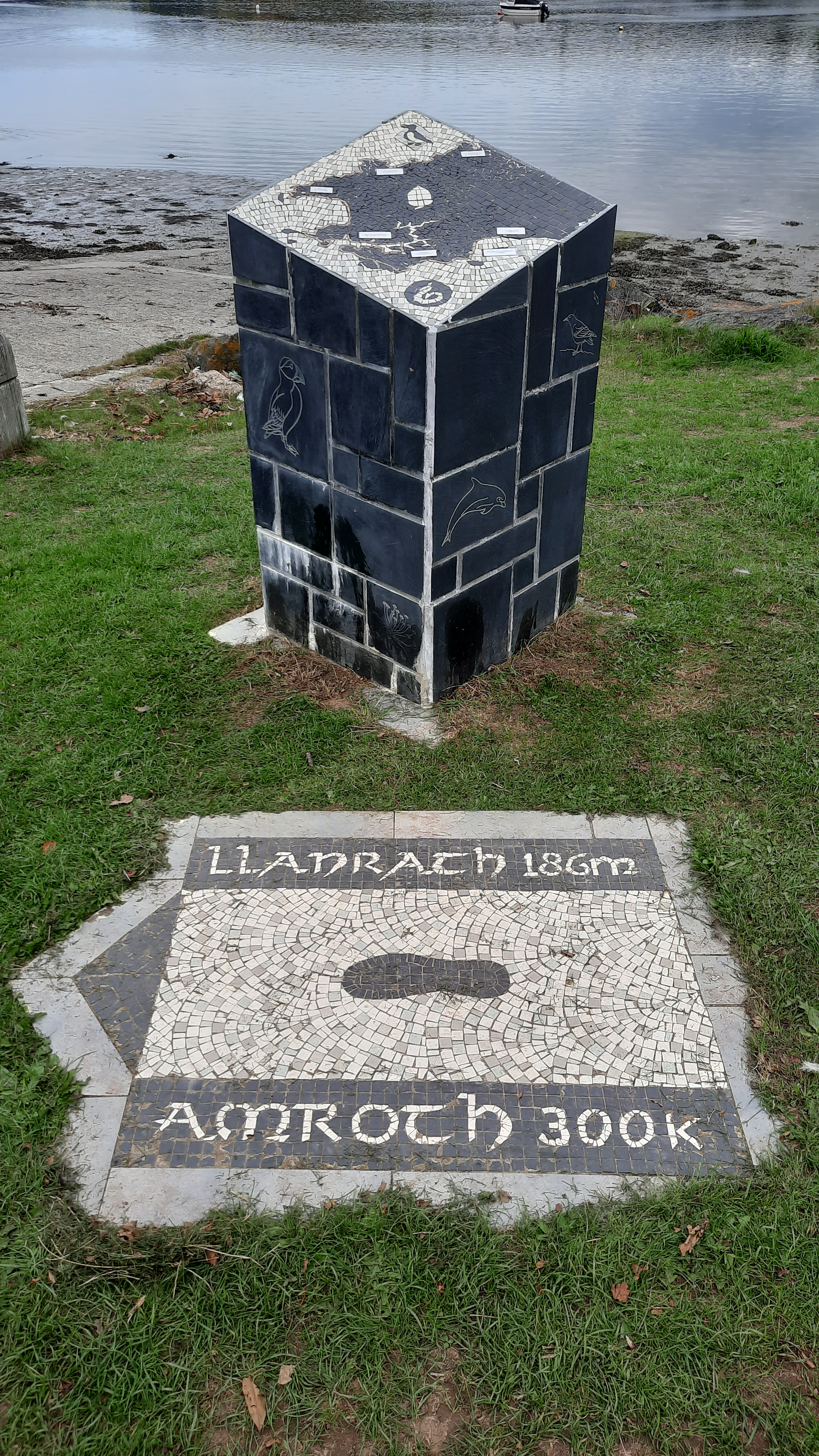
The plaque at the northern end of the Pembrokeshire Coast Path at St Dogmaels

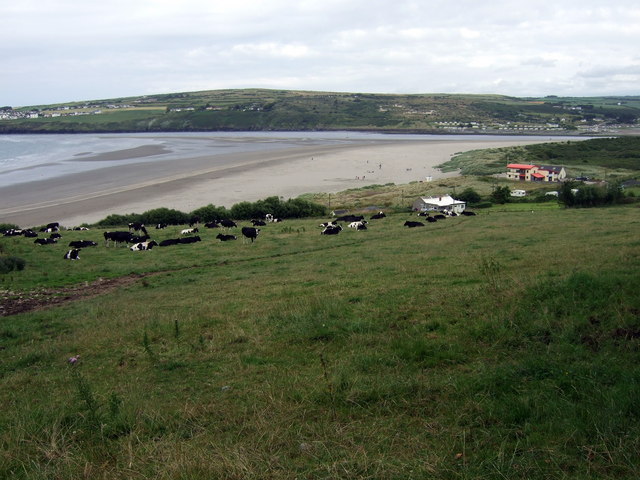
Poppit Sands, near the northern end of the trail

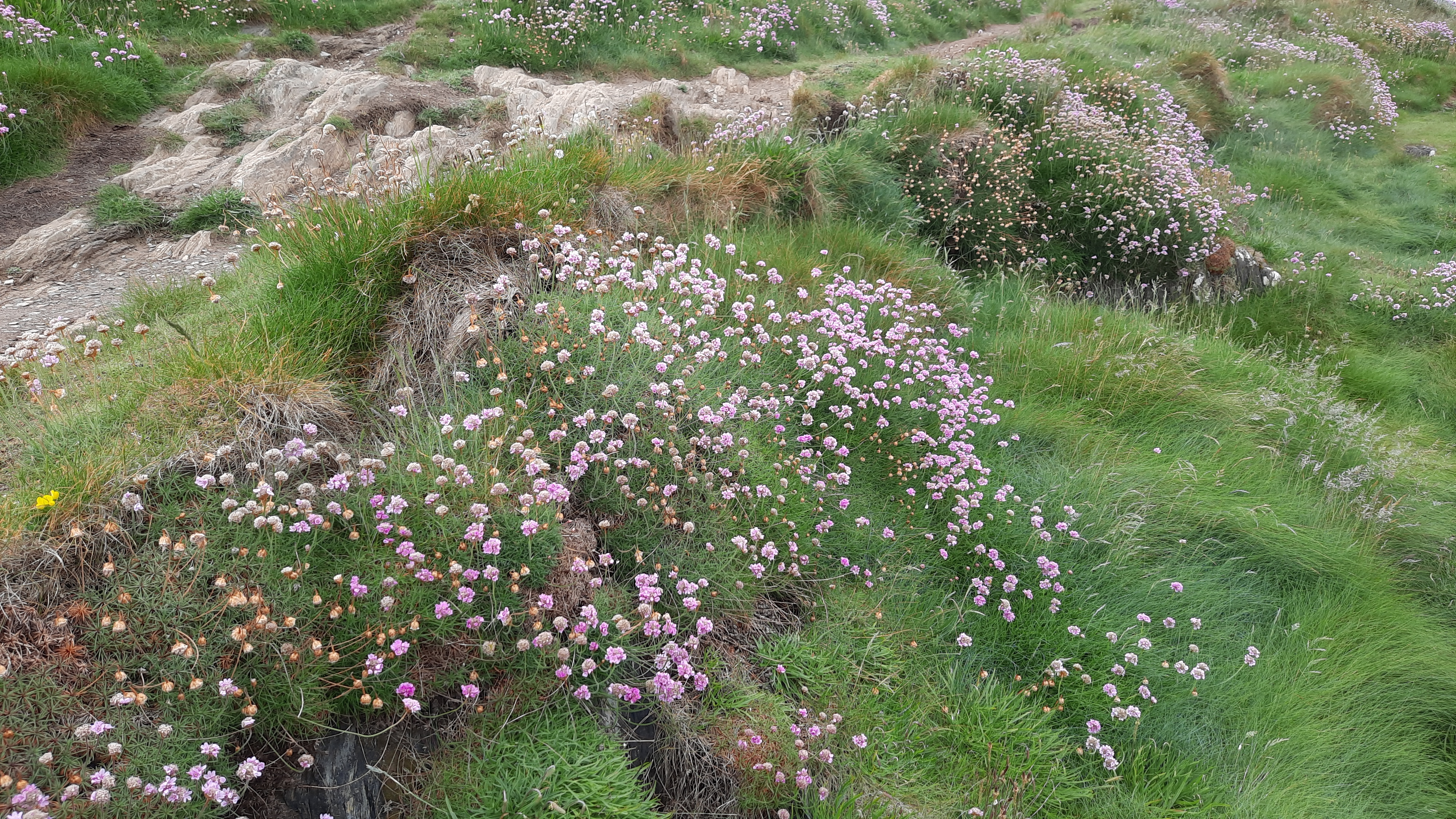
Sea thrift on the Pembrokeshire coast path near Newport

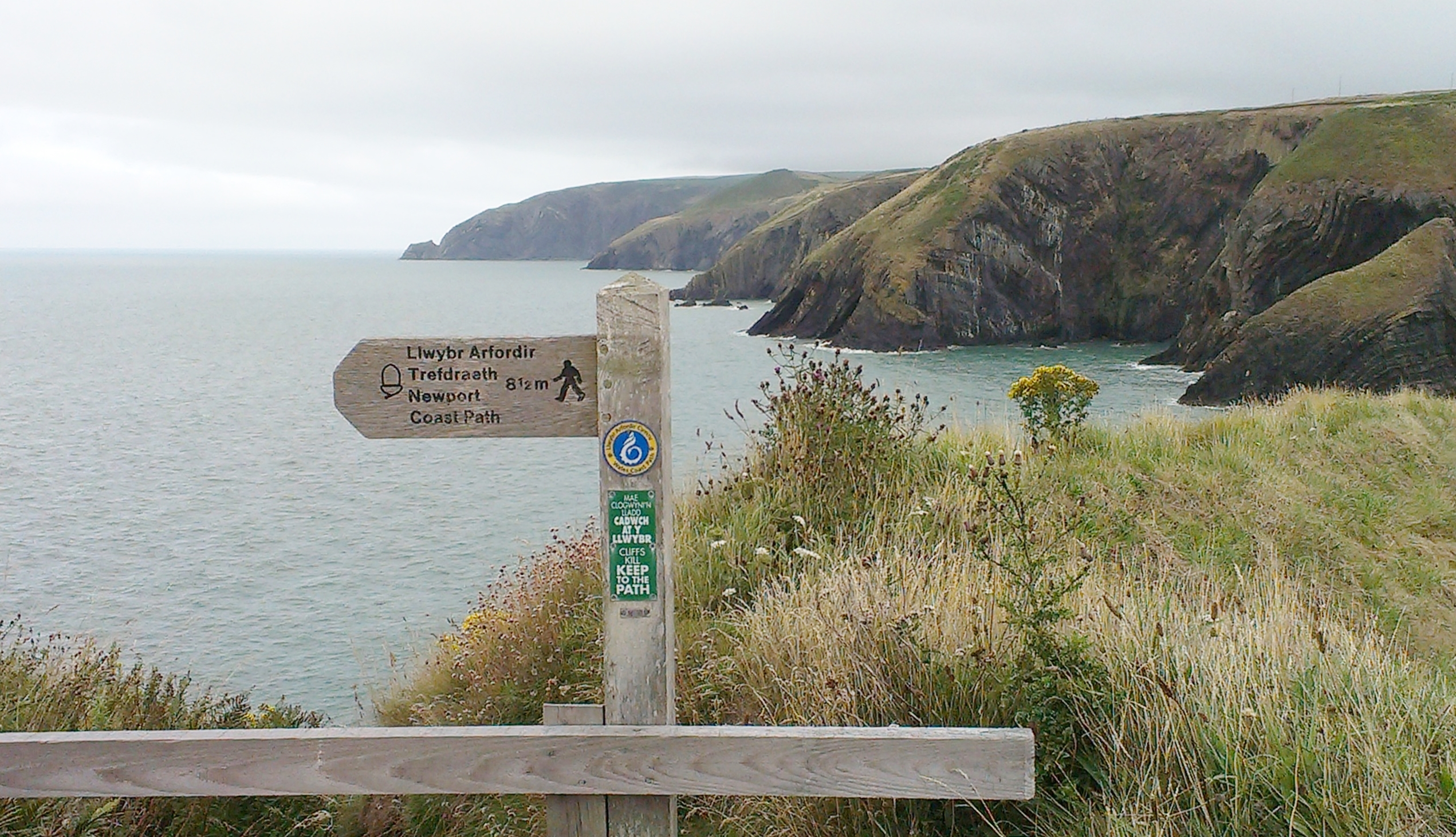
Near Ceibwr Bay, looking north towards Cemaes Head

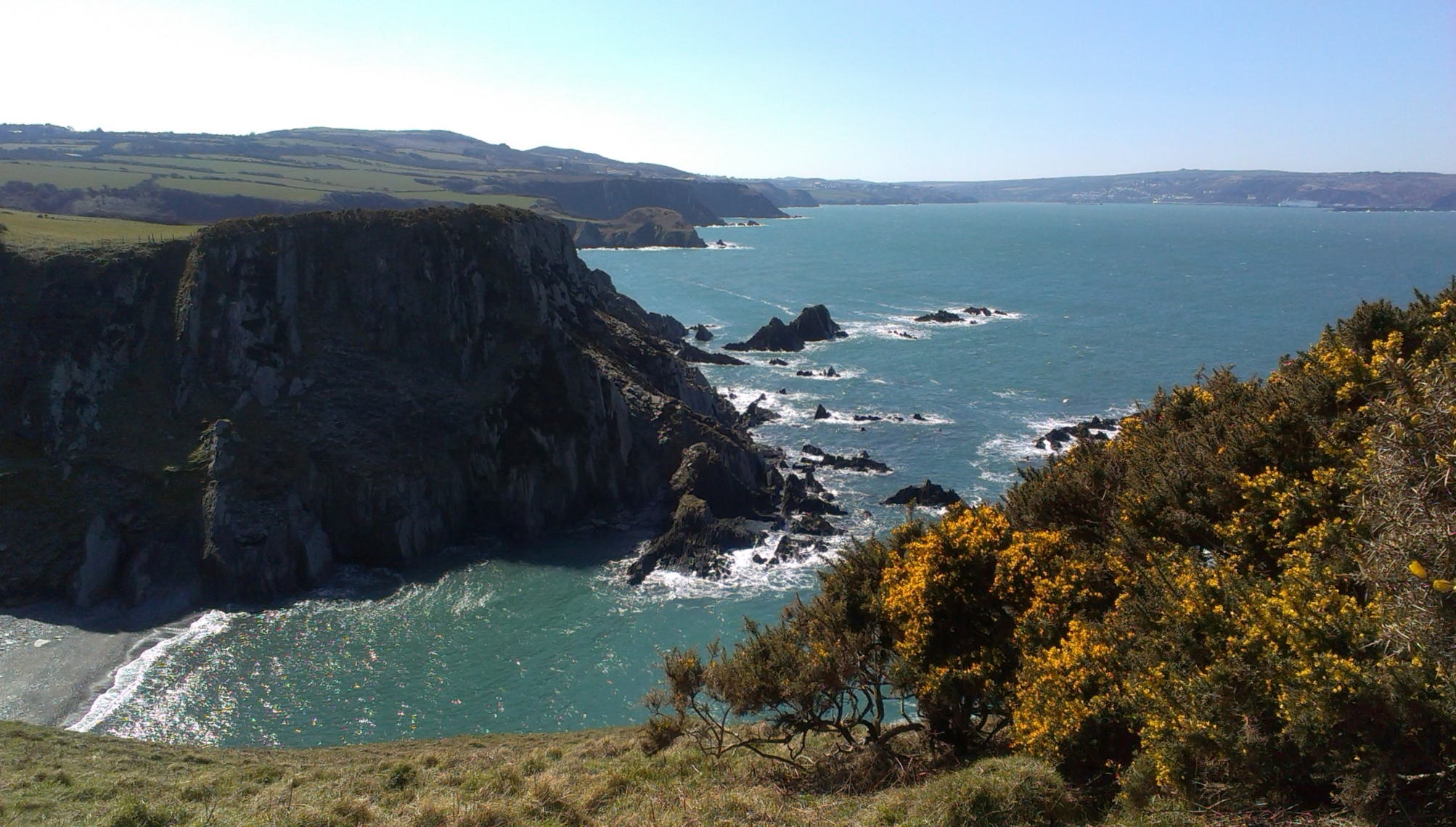
Between Pwllgwaelod and Fishguard

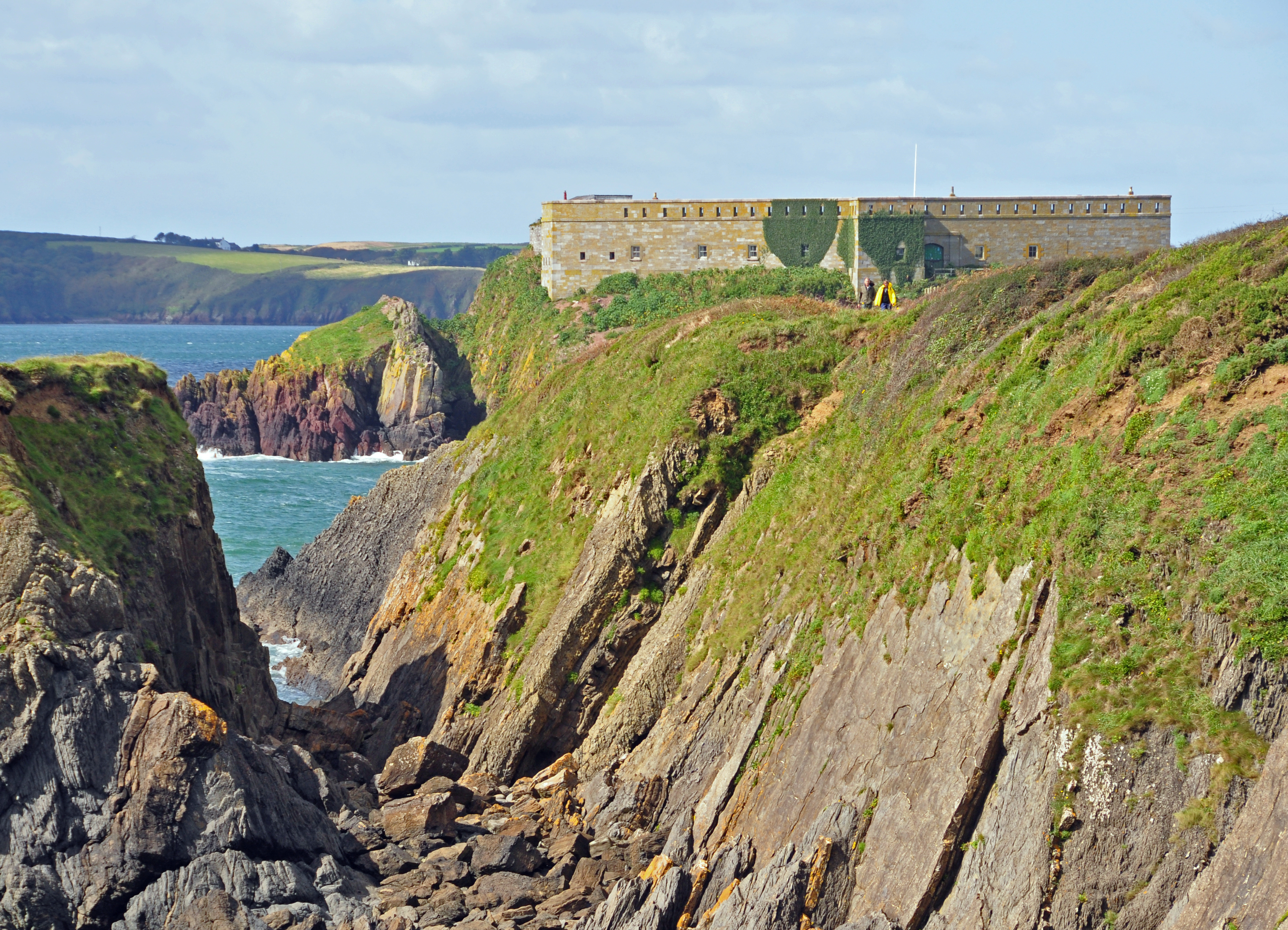
Thorn Island or Thorne Island from West Angle

The Pembrokeshire Coast Path lies almost entirely within the Pembrokeshire Coast National Park — Britain's only coastal national park. Throughout its length, it covers a range of maritime landscapes, from rugged and steep limestone cliffs and volcanic headlands to sheltered red sandstone coves, flooded glacial valleys, winding estuaries, and wide-open beaches. The path passes 58 beaches and 14 harbours.

As far as possible the route runs close to the cliff edge and coast, but this is not possible at all times; on occasion the coast is barely visible where the path briefly detours round industrial or for miles around military areas such as Castlemartin Training Area. Since the construction of the Cleddau Bridge across Milford Haven Waterway it is possible to walk the whole route of the trail without a break. The path, however, is not continuous in that it is not designated through built-up areas in the southern section, such as Milford Haven, Pembroke Dock, Tenby and Saundersfoot. There is also an undesignated section between St Dogmaels and Cardigan at the northern end of the path where Cardigan Bridge over the River Teifi is the nearest point to the coast between the Pembrokeshire and Ceredigion Coast Paths.

The walking is not strenuous, but there are constant undulations and narrow sections, including many stiles. In its entirety the Coast Path represents a considerable physical challenge — its 35,000 feet (11,000 m) of ascent and descent is said to be equivalent to climbing Everest. There are two low-tide crossings, at Dale and Sandy Haven, which require lengthy detours if not timed suitably.

Along the path are seaside towns and coastal villages, such as Tenby, St Davids, Solva and Newport. For backpackers attempting longer parts of the trail there are shops and campsites along the way, but food and water may need to be carried on some sections. There are small hotels and guest houses en route, and cottages for hire, often built in traditional styles.

For the vast majority of walkers, the coastal path is walked in shorter sections, and the Pembrokeshire Coast National Park lists some 130 shorter circular walks on its website. Access to the coastal path (by bus or car) is possible in many locations. The whole coast is served by a number of dedicated walkers' bus services, which operate over the entire length of the path, including the Puffin Shuttle, the Coastal Cruiser, the Celtic Coaster, St David's Peninsula Shuttle Service, the Strumble Shuttle, and the Poppit Rocket.

== Locations on the path ==
Listed from north to south:

- St Dogmaels
- Poppit Sands
- Cemaes Head
- Ceibwr Bay
- Newport Cliffs
- Newport
- Cwm-yr-Eglwys
- Dinas Island
- Pwllgwaelod
- Fishguard
- Goodwick
- Strumble Head
- Llechdafad Cliffs
- Abercastle
- Trefin (Trevine)
- Porthgain
- Abermawr
- Abereiddi
- Arfordir Abereiddi
- Portheiddy Moor
- St David's Head
- Whitesands Bay
- Solva
- Newgale
- Broad Haven
- Little Haven
- Marloes Sands
- St Ann's Head
- Dale
- Milford Haven
- Neyland
- Pembroke Dock
- Angle
- St Govan
- Stackpole Estate
- Greenala Point
- Freshwater East
- Manorbier
- Lydstep Haven
- Penally
- Tenby
- Saundersfoot
- Wiseman's Bridge
- Amroth

== Offshoot trails ==
There are a number of smaller trails very near the Coast Path, which often take users inland on shorter routes; these include:

- Cardigan to Cilgerran Wildlife Trail. The trail runs from Station Road, Cardigan, through Teifi Marshes Nature Reserve, to Cilgerran, passing the Welsh Wildlife Centre and following the trackbed of the former Whitland and Cardigan Railway.
- Cilgerran Gorge Circular Walk. This is a medium-length walk of 4.2 miles (6.8 km) lasting around 3 hours. It starts at Dolbadau car park, Cilgerran and follows the woodland pathway to the Wildlife Centre and returning via undulating paths up and down the steep-sided Cilgerran Gorge.
- Brunel Way Walk. This is a long walk of 9 miles (14 km) on well-surfaced tarmac pathways, lasting around 4 hours. It begins at Brunel Quay car park, Neyland and ends at County Hall, Haverfordwest. Along the way there are views of Milford Haven and of the quay.

== Geology ==
All the rocks underlying the surface are more than 300 million years old, but the coastline as seen today has been much subjected to the effects of coastal and river action and, in places, to events which occurred during the Ice Age.

The oldest igneous and volcanic Precambrian granites outcrop on Ramsey and at the southern tip of the peninsula. Later Cambrian sedimentation produced sandstones, visible on the northern coast of St Brides Bay (and which were used in the building St David's Cathedral). Subsequent Ordovician fine muds dominate the northern Pembrokeshire coast, but volcanic activity has complicated the whole. The later Silurian Period saw the creation of limestone and shale, visible along the southern Marloes peninsula. The coast of St Brides Bay is backed by Coal Measures rocks dating from the late Carboniferous Period as is the coast between Tenby and Amroth and the upper reaches of the Cleddau. Much of the rest of Milford Haven is fronted by Old Red Sandstone from the preceding Devonian Period along with all of the Dale peninsula and Skokholm Island. Carboniferous Limestone dating from the early Carboniferous forms much of the southern coast traversed by the coast path notably between Freshwater West and Stackpole and between Lydstep and Tenby.

Subsequent earth movements, erosion by ice and water, and changes in sea level have further affected what we see today.

== Wildlife ==
During the spring and early summer the path displays an array of wild coastal flowers, and there is a wealth of bird life. Colonies of seabirds nest along the cliffs, and a variety of European seabirds are supported by the uninhabited offshore islands that act as bird sanctuaries, such as Skomer, Skokholm and Ramsey Island. Seals, porpoises and dolphins can often be spotted swimming offshore.

== Human history and activity ==
Remnants of Neolithic cromlechs and hut circles can be seen on the path, as can evidence of Bronze Age settlement, by which time the peninsula was being used as a connection to Ireland. Iron Age settlers, probably originating in France, are responsible for the number of coastal promontory fortifications visible today. The evidence of later human activity, such as Norman castles and settlements, and hermit churches, is also evident. Today almost all the surrounding land is farmed, and fishing still plays a role, albeit less prominent, in the coastal settlements.

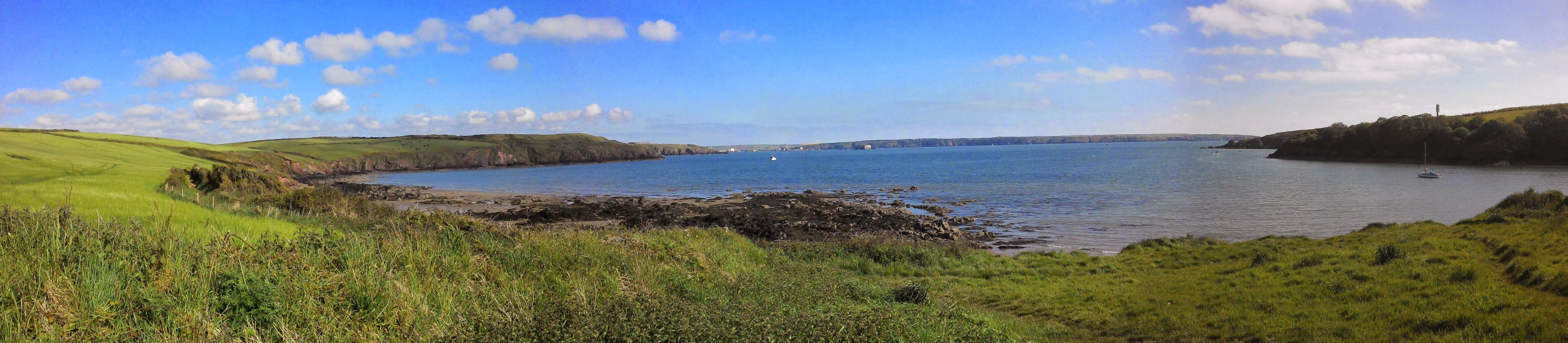
Panoramic of Sandy Haven beach near Milford Haven, looking out to the Cleddau estuary

== Award ==
In 2011 National Geographic magazine voted Pembrokeshire the second-best coastal destination in the world.

The Coastal Path passes all of Pembrokeshire's award-winning beaches, Over the years these have been awarded 41 Blue Flag Awards (13 in 2011), 47 Green Coast Awards (15 in 2011) and 106 Seaside Awards (31 in 2011). In 2011 there were 39 beaches recommended by the Marine Conservation Society.

== See also ==
- List of long-distance footpaths in the United Kingdom
- Pembrokeshire Coast National Park
