= Jeffreyston =

Village, parish and community in Pembrokeshire, Wales

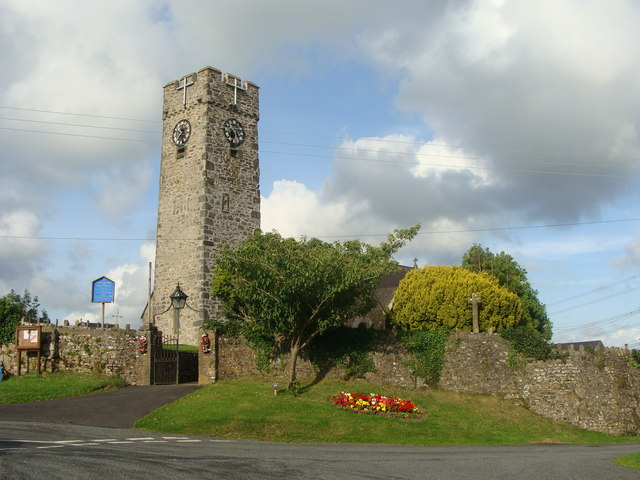
- Church of St Jeffrey and St Oswald

- Location within Pembrokeshire
- Population: 574 (2011)
- OS grid reference: SN089066
- Principal area: Pembrokeshire
- Preserved county: Dyfed
- Country: Wales
- Sovereign state: United Kingdom
- Post town: KILGETTY
- Postcode district: SA68
- Dialling code: 01646 651
- Police: Dyfed-Powys
- Fire: Mid and West Wales
- Ambulance: Welsh
- UK Parliament: Mid and South Pembrokeshire
- Senedd Cymru – Welsh Parliament: Ceredigion Penfro
- List of places UK Wales Pembrokeshire 51.73°N 4.77°W Map of the community

Jeffreyston (also known as Jeffreston) is a village, parish and community in Pembrokeshire.

Jeffreyston lies on the B4586 road about 1 mile (1.6 km) northwest of the main A477 St Clears to Pembroke road; the nearest town is Tenby about 6 miles (9.7 km) to the southeast.

== Community ==
As well as Jeffreyston itself, the predominantly rural and agricultural community includes the settlements of Cresselly, Cresswell Quay, Loveston and Yerbeston. In 2011 the community's population was 574.

=== Cresselly ===
The name Cresselly probably originated as Croes Elli.

=== Cresswell Quay ===
On the Cresswell River which flows into Milford Haven Waterway, Cresswell Quay has been a loading port for coal mined in the area for centuries; remains of the quays can still be seen. The settlement is marked (as Creswel) on a 1578 parish map of Pembrokeshire. To the north, on the left bank of the river, are the ruins of Cresswell Castle.

=== Loveston ===
Loveston has its own church. Loveston pit disaster in 1936, in which seven colliers were drowned, brought an end to mining in the area.

== Parish ==
As well as Jeffreyston village, the parish includes the settlements of Cresselly and Cresswell Quay.

The parish church is dedicated to St Jeffrey and St Oswald and is a Grade II* listed building.

Cresselly House in the village of Cresselly is a Grade II* listed Georgian country house built around 1770, seat of the Allen family; it is now a country house hotel and wedding venue.

== Notable people ==
- James Relly (ca.1721–1778), Methodist minister who spread Christian universalism in the United States.
- Lancelot Baugh Allen (1774–1845), Master of the College of God's Gift in Dulwich up to 1820.
- Henry George Allen MA JP QC (1815–1908), a British lawyer and Liberal politician.

== Site of Special Scientific Interest ==
Jeffreyston Pastures is a SSSI south of Jeffreyston. It was designated as such in January 1996 in an attempt to protect its fragile biological elements. The site has an area of 15.72 hectares (38.8 acres) and is managed by Natural Resources Wales.

== School ==
St Oswald's Church in Wales VA School is in Jeffreyston.

== History ==
Anthracite and coal mining was carried out in the area, first recorded in the 13th century and continuing into the 20th century. Coal was shipped to Sussex from Cresswell Quay, where vessels up to about 80 tons could be loaded.
