= List of Sites of Special Scientific Interest in Pembrokeshire =

Map of Pembrokeshire within Wales

This is a list of the Sites of Special Scientific Interest (SSSIs) in the Pembrokeshire Area of Search (AoS).

== Sites ==
- Aber Mawr
- Eastern Cleddau River
- Western Cleddau River
- Afon Teifi
- Allt Pontfaen - Coed Gelli-fawr
- Angle Peninsula Coast
- Arfordir Abereiddi
- Arfordir Niwgwl - Aber bach - Newgale Little Haven
- Arfordir Saundersfoot - Telpyn Coast
- Beech Cottage, Waterwynch
- Broomhill Burrows
- Carew Castle
- Carn Ingli
- Castlemartin Corse
- Castlemartin Range
- Cemaes Head
- Treffgarne Gorge & Tors
- Chwarel Bryn Banc (bryn Bank Quarry)
- Coed Ty-canol (ty-canol Wood)
- Coedydd A Corsydd Aberteifi (teifi Estuary Woodlands & Marshes)
- Comins Tre-rhos - Tre-rhos Common
- Cors Penally - Penally Marsh
- Corsydd Llangloffan
- Creigiau Abergwaun - Fishguard Cliffs
- Cwm Bach, Sychpant
- Cwm Dewi
- Dale And South Marloes Coast
- De Porth Sain Ffraid / St Bride's Bay South
- Dowrog Common
- Dwrhyd Pit
- Dyffryn Gwaun
- Esgyrn Bottom
- Felin Llwyngwair
- Freshwater East Cliffs to Skrinkle Haven
- Gallt Llanerch - Coed Gelli-deg
- Garn Wood, Kilkiffeth Wood, Dan-Deri-Cwm Felin Ban
- Gas Works Lane Section, Haverfordwest
- Grassholm - Ynys Gwales
- Gweunydd Blaencleddau
- Gweunydd Hendre Eynon (Hendre Eynon Pastures)
- Hook Wood
- Jeffreyston Pastures
- Little Hoyle and Hoyles Mouth Caves and woodland
- Lydstep Head to Tenby Burrows
- Marloes Mere
- Milford Haven Waterway
- Minwear Wood
- Mountain Meadows
- Mynydd Preseli
- Newport Cliffs
- Offshore Islets of Pembroke Ynysoedd Glanau Penfro
- Orielton Stable Block and Cellars
- Park House Outbuildings
- Pengelli Forest and Pant-teg Wood
- Portheiddy Moor
- Ramsey - Ynys Dewi
- Rhosydd Yerbeston - Yerbeston Moors
- Ritec Fen
- Robeston Wathen Quarries
- Shoalshook Railway Cutting and Pit
- Skokholm
- Skomer Island and Middleholm
- Slebech Stable Yard Loft, Cellars and Tunnels
- St Davids Airfield Heaths
- St Davids Peninsula Coast
- St Margaret's Island
- Stackpole
- Stackpole Courtyard Flats and Walled Garden
- Stackpole Quay - Trewent Point
- Strumble Head - Llechdafad Cliffs
- Tenby Cliffs and St Catherines Island
- Trefeiddan Moor
- Treffgarne Bridge Quarry
- Treitio Common
- Wallis Moor
- Waterwynch Bay to Saundersfoot Harbour
- Waun Fawr Ty Ddewi - St Davids
- Waun Fawr, Puncheston
- Wyndrush Pastures
