= Felin Llwyngwair =

Protected area in Pembrokeshire, Wales

- Site of Special Scientific Interest
- Location within Wales
- Location of Felin Llwyngwair.
- Area of search: Pembrokeshire
- Grid reference: SN0696739245
- Coordinates: 52.01796°N 4.8145485°W
- Interest: Biological
- Area: 0.01 ha (0.025 acres)
- Notification date: 2000

Felin Llwyngwair is a Site of Special Scientific Interest (or SSSI) near Newport in Pembrokeshire, South Wales. It was designated a SSSI (ID2580, code 32WE3) in October 2000 to protect its fragile biological elements. The site has an area of 0.01 hectares (120 sq. yd.) and is managed by Natural Resources Wales.

== Type ==
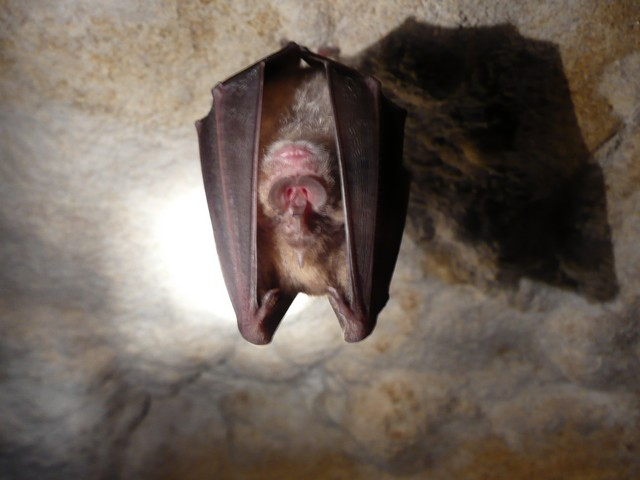
One of the smallest SSSI sites in Britain, which protects the greater horseshoe bat.

This site is designated for its biological features, in particular: the Rhinolophus ferrumequinum (greater horseshoe bat). SSSIs in Wales have been notified for a total of 142 different animal species and 191 different plant species.

Greater horseshoe bats require warm, safe roosts in which to raise their young, with plenty of suitable feeding habitat nearby. The period of greatest bat activity at this roost is between May and the end of August.

== See also ==
- List of Sites of Special Scientific Interest in Pembrokeshire
