= Milford Haven Waterway SSSI =

Protected area in Pembrokeshire, Wales

Milford Haven Waterway
- Site of Special Scientific Interest
- Location within Wales
- Location of Milford Haven Waterway.
- Area of search: Pembrokeshire
- Grid reference: SM830040 to SM960120
- Coordinates: 51.69028°N 5.00594°W
- Interest: Geological and Biological
- Area: 2,192.1 hectares (5,417 acres)
- Notification date: 2002

Milford Haven Waterway, is a Site of Special Scientific Interest (SSSI) on Milford Haven Waterway in Pembrokeshire, South Wales, designated since 2002. The site is protected for a wide range of reasons, including its geology, marine environment and ecosystems, and to protect a diversity of flora and fauna.

== Geology ==
Milford Haven Waterway is an exceptional example of a ria (a system of valleys drowned by post-glacial rise in sea level) that consists of a number of estuaries, embayments and inlets. Cliffs in the southern regions are mostly developed in rocks of the Old Red Sandstone, whereas the geology of the upper reaches is relatively complex. In the outer part of Milford Haven vertical cliffs are common but elsewhere the cliff profile is often composed of a slope with a vertical rock face below it, the slope being a remnant from an earlier landform - a river valley - that has not yet been eroded by the sea. In many locations stony clays mantle the middle section of the cliff profile and are exposed above the rock faces.

The cliffs and foreshore at Little Castle Head (Note: Little Castle Head: 51.71562°N 5.10689°W) provide exposures of two air-fall tuff horizons (Note: Tuff is lithified volcanic ash; in this case airborne ash which settled, and by age and compression, has been turned to solid rock.) within the Sandy Haven Formation of the Lower Old Red Sandstone, Milford Haven Group. The two tuff units, the Pickard Bay Tuff Bed and the Townsend Tuff Bed, are useful stratigraphical marker horizons, particularly the latter, which can be traced across the whole of the Old Red Sandstone outcrop in South Wales. At Little Castle Head the tuffs are exposed in an area of tight folding, and comparison of logged sections across the limbs of the folds shows lateral variations in the thickness of the tuff beds and the intervening sandstone units. Faecal pellets have been preserved as unusual trace fossils at the base of, and within, the tuffs.

== Biology ==
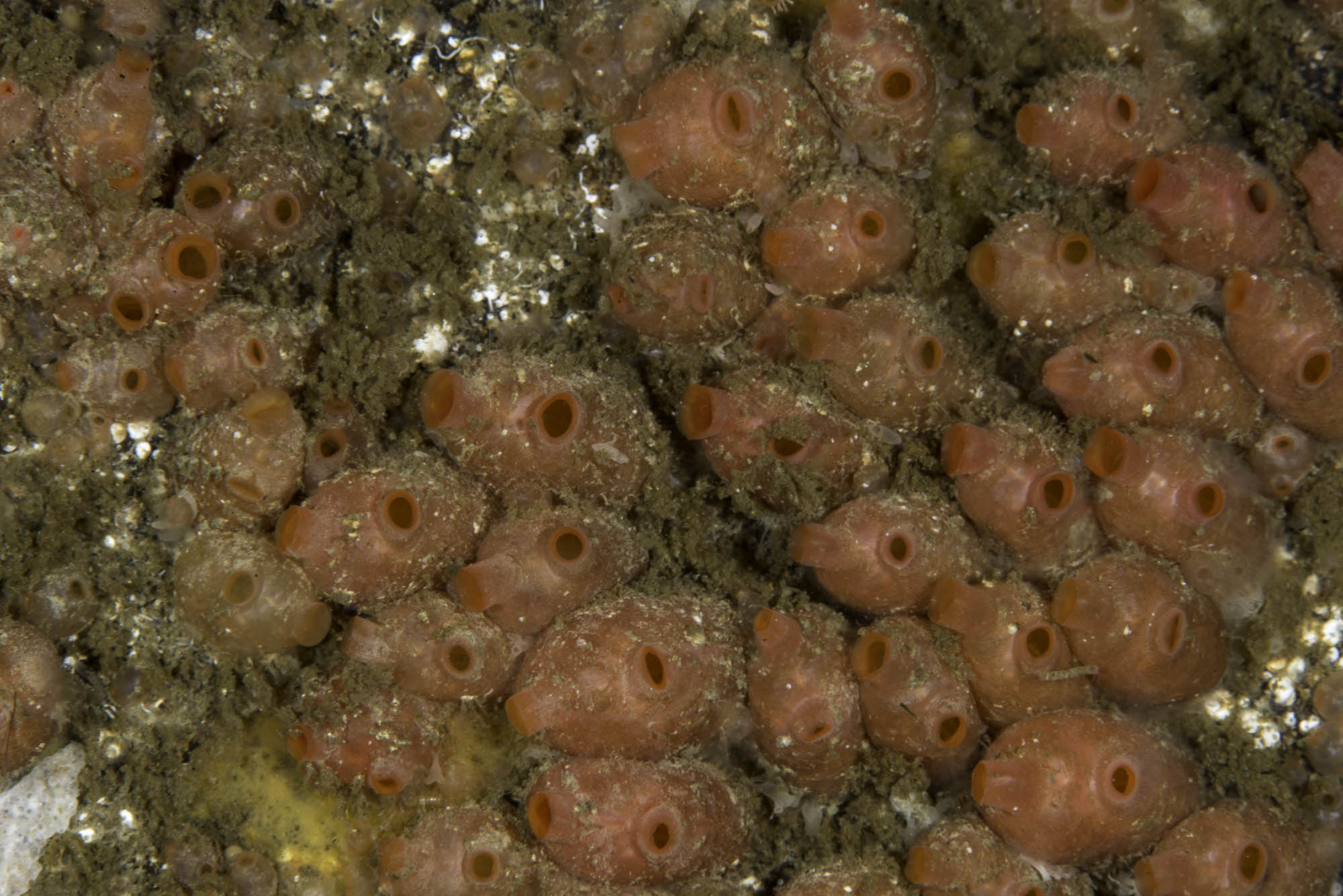
Gooseberry seasquirt (Dendrodoa grossularia)

The Milford Haven Waterway consists of a main channel that has extensive rocky shores, with large sandy beaches in embayments near the entrance, and mudflats in sheltered areas further up the channel and in muddy creeks (pills) at intervals along the length of the inlet. The foreshore supports good examples of a variety of intertidal marine habitats including muddy gravels, sheltered mud, moderately exposed sand, and sheltered rock. These shore types support a diverse range of intertidal communities, with species-rich rock pools, marine eelgrass Zostera spp. beds, and overhang and under-boulder communities. Tidal water movements are particularly strong in places, allowing the development of tide swept lower shore communities that are particularly rich, with animal species such as the breadcrumb sponge (Halichondria panicea), gooseberry seasquirt (Dendrodoa grossularia) and star seasquirt (Botryllus schlosseri). Other communities include beds of native oyster (Ostrea edulis) and areas of mixed sediment supporting segmented worms of the family Syllidae.

The site supports three saline lagoons; the Pickleridge lagoon (Note: Pickerage lagoon: 51.718791°N 5.170595°W) within the Gann Estuary, (Note: Gann Estuary: 51.715791°N 5.166239°W) a weired pool at Westfield Pill (Note: Westfield Pill: 51.720668°N 4.946161°W) near Neyland and the old Millpond (Note: Carew Castle old Millpond: 51.698944°N 4.831260°W) within the grounds of Carew Castle. Saline lagoons are an unusual and rare habitat both in the UK and elsewhere supporting a number of characteristic species that are rarely found in other habitats. Species found in the above three sites include the nationally scarce tentacled lagoon worm (Alkmaria romijni) and the crustacean Gammarus chevreuxi, along with lagoon cockle (Cerastoderma glaucum).

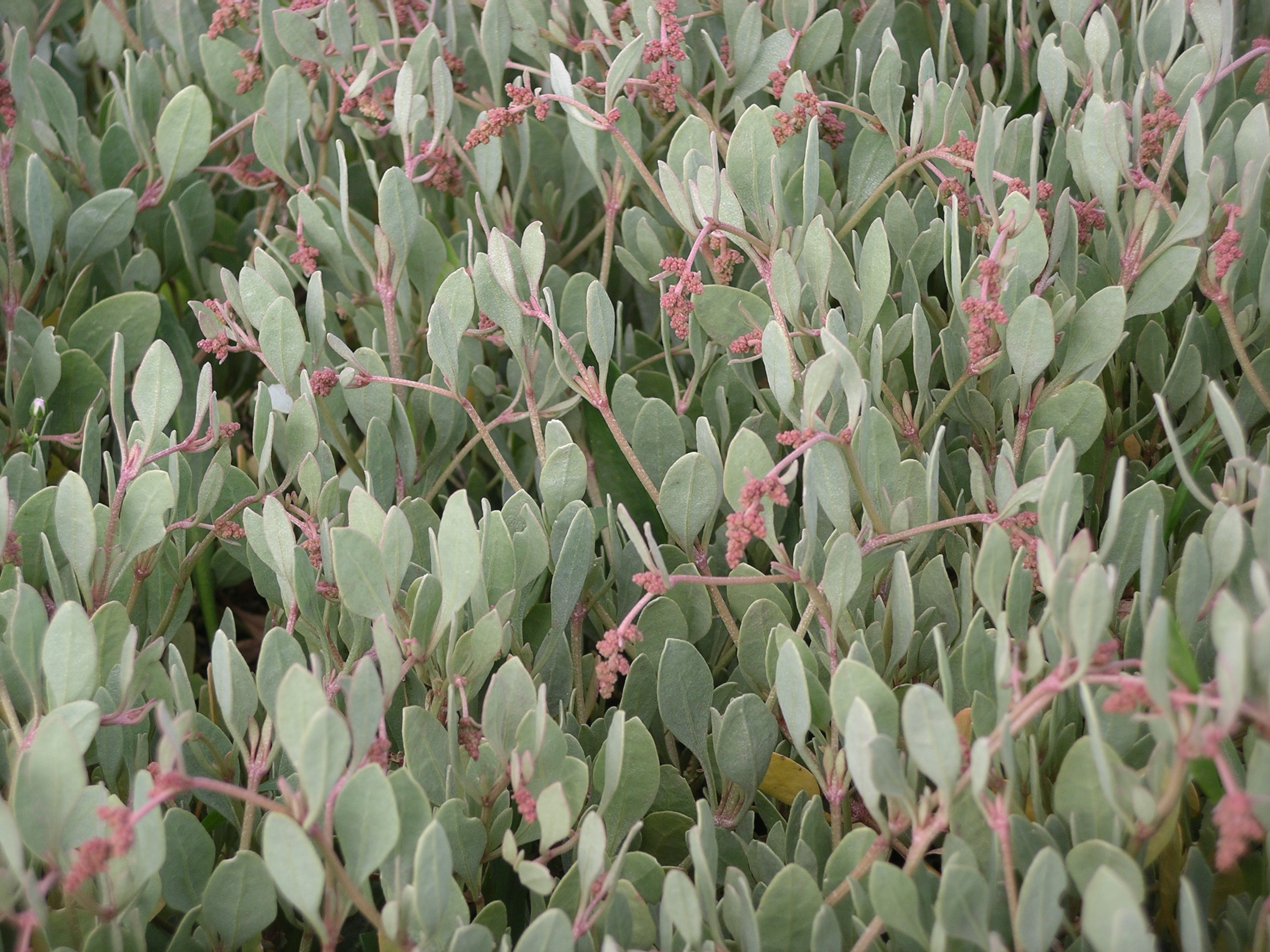
Sea purslane (Atriplex portulacoides)

The saltmarshes within the Haven occur predominantly in sheltered areas within the upper regions of the main channel, and in the muddy creeks (pills) and embayments found at intervals along the length of the inlet. A variety of saltmarsh communities exist within the site, the most extensive being characterised by the pioneering species common cord-grass (Spartina anglica) on the lower shore. Other dominant species include sea purslane (Atriplex portulacoides), common saltmarsh grass (Puccinellia maritima) and red fescue (Festuca rubra). These grade into upper saltmarsh or brackish communities with occasional sea rush (Juncus maritimus) and saltmarsh rush (Juncus gerardii). In some areas, there is a transition zone from upper saltmarsh into areas of reed-bed dominated by Phragmites australis. Species found within the saltmarsh include the nationally scarce lax-flowered sea-lavender (Limonium humile) and the one-flowered glasswort (Salicornia pusilla).

Ancient woodland, dominated by sessile oak (Quercus petraea), fringes areas of the main channel. This relict woodland becomes more extensive at Lawrenny, which can be dated back to at least 1600 when extensive oak woods once clothed all the shoreline of the 'drowned valley' system of Milford Haven. Wild service-tree (Sorbus torminalis) is frequent on the lower slopes and the ground flora is rich with ancient woodland indicator species. The woodland supports a large number of interesting lichens including the nationally rare Arthonia astroidea.

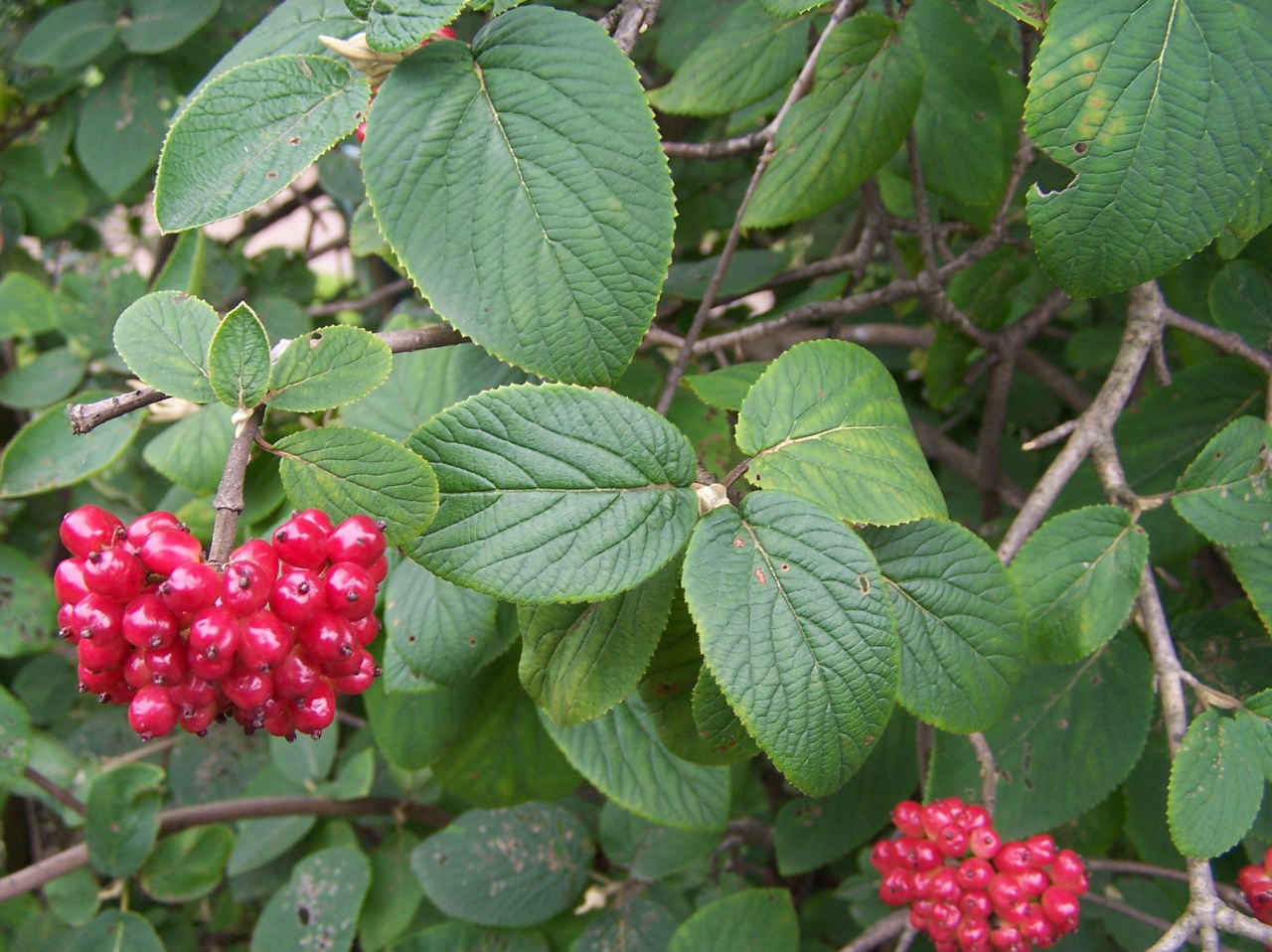
Wayfaring tree (Viburnum lantana)

The various habitats within the Haven support a rich assemblage of flowering plants. The site supports some of the largest populations in Pembrokeshire of species that have seen a marked decline at the national level over recent years. These populations include dwarf eelgrass (Zostera noltei), marsh pea (Lathyrus palustris), spurge-laurel (Daphne laureola) and wayfaring tree (Viburnum lantana). Other nationally rare or scarce flowering plants include rock sea-lavender (Limonium procerum spp. cambrense), musk stork's-bill (Erodium moschatum), marsh mallow (Althaea officinalis) and chamomile (Chamaemelum nobile). The coastal slopes throughout the Haven support a rich assemblage of mosses and liverworts. The nationally rare moss Tortula cuneifolia is another species that has undergone a significant decline in Britain in recent years, has been recorded within the site. Nationally scarce lower plants include the mosses Bryum torquescens and Weissia perssonii along with the liverwort Cololejeunea minutissima.

The saltmarsh and mudflats within the Haven support significant numbers of overwintering wildfowl and waders. This number rises during particularly hard winters, when the mild Pembrokeshire climate results in the Haven population becoming augmented by wildfowl and waders coming in from other estuaries to the east that have become frozen. Species of special interest within the Haven include little grebe (Tachybaptus ruficollis), shelduck (Tadorna tadorna), Eurasian wigeon (Anas penelope), Eurasian teal (Anas crecca), dunlin (Calidris alpina) and Eurasian curlew (Numenius arquata). The Haven makes up the lower part of the Cleddau catchment, an area recognised as being one of the most important places in southern Britain for otter.

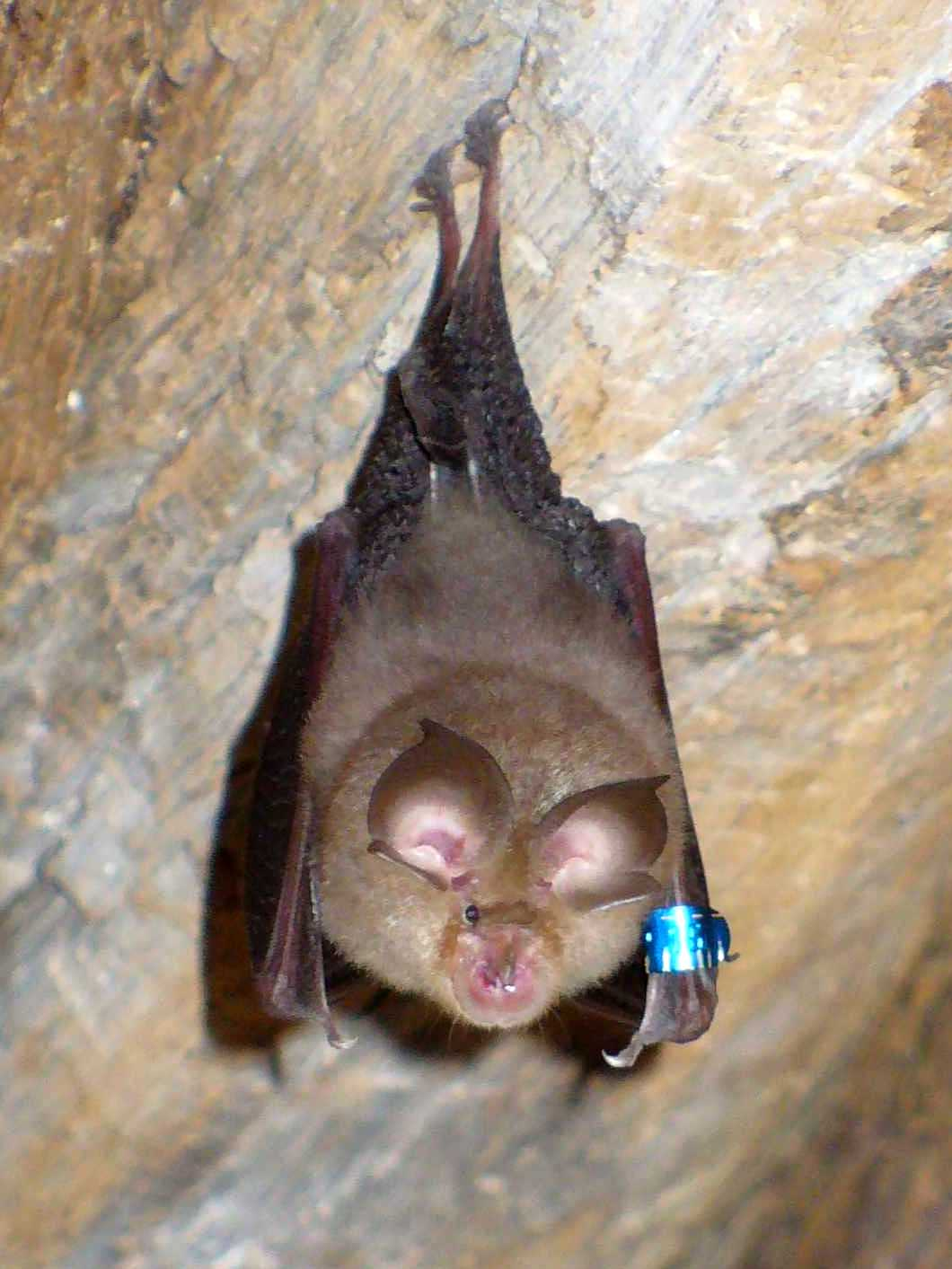
Lesser horseshoe bat

Within the vicinity of the Haven are important bat breeding sites, supporting internationally important populations of greater horseshoe bats, as well as nationally important numbers of lesser horseshoe bats. Broadleaved woodland and scrub, along with estuarine and grassland habitats, that border the main channel and its various embayments and inlets, provide essential feeding grounds for the bats, as well as flight paths between sites. The horseshoe bats and other bat species also roost in buildings and caves (adjacent to and within the site) during the year. These roosts are used by bats as daytime roosts, night-feeding roosts, or as winter hibernacula.

Saltmarsh on the site supports a number of nationally scarce invertebrate species including comb footed spider (Enoplognatha mordex), the ground and short winged mould beetles (Bembidion laterale and Brachygluta simplex), the weevils Polydrusus pulchellus and Notaris bimaculatus, the hoverfly Platycheirus immarginatus and the cranefly Limonia (Dicranomyia) complicata. Blackthorn (Prunus spinosa) scrub in places supports nationally important populations of brown hairstreak butterfly (Thecla betula), a species that has undergone a rapid decline throughout Britain during the last thirty years.

== Ownership and overlapping protections ==
Parts of the site are owned by Pembrokeshire County Council and the National Trust; both organisations lease parts of the site to the Wildlife Trust of South and West Wales. The Crown Estate owns the majority of the foreshore, which is leased to Pembrokeshire County Council and the Pembrokeshire Coast National Park. Sporting rights are leased to the Pembrokeshire Wildfowlers Association and the Pembroke Rod and Gun Club.

Approximately two-thirds of the site lies within the Pembrokeshire Coast National Park. The area covered by the Wild Birds (Cleddau Sanctuary) Order 1970 lies within the site, which is also part of the Pembrokeshire Marine/Sir Benfo Forol candidate Special Area of Conservation for its estuary, shallow inlets and bays, reefs, Atlantic salt meadows, otter, intertidal mudflats and sandflats and lagoon features.

The otter and greater and lesser horseshoe bats are listed in Annex IIa of the EC Habitats Directive (Directive 92/43/EEC on the Conservation of Natural Habitats and of Wild Fauna and Flora).

The tentacled lagoon worm Alkmaria romijni, otter and greater and lesser horseshoe bats are listed under Schedule 5 of the Wildlife and Countryside Act 1981.

The entire SSSI falls within a Marine Character Area, used by the Welsh government to "highlight the key natural, cultural and perceptual influences that make the character of each seascape distinct and unique". It also falls within the Pembrokeshire Marine Special Area of Conservation, a European Marine Site designated in 2004.

== Subdivisions ==
The site is divided, for management reasons, into 11 component areas covering the shores and mudflats of most of the ria from its mouth at Dale Point on the north shore and Thorn Island on the south, to the upper reaches of the Daugleddau at Haverfordwest in the west and Blackpool Mill in the north-east. The areas are:

- Angle Bay
- Carew and Cresswell Rivers
- Cosheston Pill
- Dale Point to Musselwick Point
- Daugleddau
- Lawrenny Wood
- Littlewick Point to Brunel Quay
- Milford Haven South
- Musselwick Point to Littlewick Point
- Pembroke River
- Sandy Haven

== See also ==
- List of Sites of Special Scientific Interest in Pembrokeshire
