= Trefeiddan Moor =

Protected area in Pembrokeshire, Wales

- Site of Special Scientific Interest
- Location within Wales
- Location of Trefeiddan Moor.
- Area of search: Pembrokeshire
- Grid reference: SM7329525048
- Coordinates: 51.878°N 5.295°W
- Interest: Biological
- Area: 21.61 hectares (53.4 acres)
- Notification date: 1966

Trefeiddan Moor is a Site of Special Scientific Interest (or SSSI) in Pembrokeshire, South Wales. It has been designated as a Site of Special Scientific Interest since January 1966 in an attempt to protect its fragile biological elements. The site has an area of 21.61 hectares (53.4 acres) and is managed by Natural Resources Wales.

== Type ==
This site is designated due to its biological qualities. SSSIs in Wales have been notified for a total of 142 different animal species and 191 different plant species.

The pale dog violet (Viola lactea) is particularly dependent on the heathland whilst the pillwort, slender centaury and chamomile thrive on winter-wet disturbed ground near and on paths and tracks. Floating water plants need areas of open water at least ankle-deep in summer and without too much organic matter. Natural Resources Wales attempts to encourage these conditions.

== See also ==
- List of Sites of Special Scientific Interest in Pembrokeshire
