= Gallt Llanerch - Coed Gelli-deg =

Protected area in Pembrokeshire, Wales

- Site of Special Scientific Interest
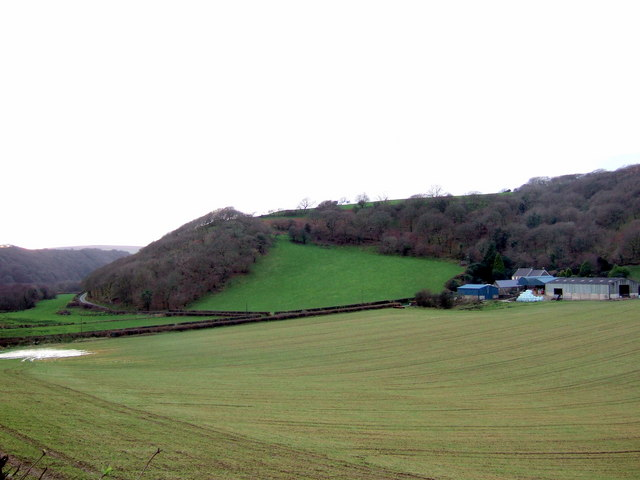
- Llannerch Farm on site

- Location within Wales
- Location of Gallt Llanerch - Coed Gelli-deg.
- Area of search: Pembrokeshire
- Grid reference: SN064358
- Coordinates: 51.987°N 4.821°W
- Interest: Biological
- Area: 30.47 ha (75.3 acres)
- Notification date: 1954

Gallt Llanerch - Coed Gelli-deg is a Site of Special Scientific Interest (or SSSI) in the Gwaun Valley, Pembrokeshire, South Wales. It is about 4 km south of Newport, within the Pembrokeshire Coast National Park. It has been designated as a Site of Special Scientific Interest since January 1954 in an attempt to protect its fragile biological elements. The site has an area of 30.47 hectares and is managed by Natural Resources Wales.

== Type and features ==
This site is designated on the basis of its wildlife, such as birds, glow-worms, newts, reptiles and insects. SSSIs in Wales have been notified for a total of 142 different animal species and 191 different plant species.

The site has two special features:

- Broadleaved woodland
- Lichens typical of ancient woodlands

The site is unusual in that it escaped clear-felling during the two World Wars and some oak trees have survived. Species not native to Pembrokeshire have been planted in the past, including beech and sycamore trees which will gradually be removed from the wood as both species create dense shade, making conditions unfavourable for many lichens.

== See also ==
- List of Sites of Special Scientific Interest in Pembrokeshire
