= Park House Outbuildings =

Protected area in Pembrokeshire, Wales

Park House Outbuildings, Stackpole
- Site of Special Scientific Interest
- Location within Wales
- Location of Park House Outbuildings, Stackpole.
- Area of search: Pembrokeshire
- Grid reference: SR9812896154
- Coordinates: 51.627891°N 4.9180542°W
- Interest: Biological
- Area: 0.01 ha (0.025 acres)
- Notification date: 1998

Park House Outbuildings, Stackpole is a Site of Special Scientific Interest (or SSSI) in Pembrokeshire, South Wales, 4 kilometres (2.5 mi) south of Pembroke, and is of special interest as the largest known nursery roosts of lesser horseshoe bats Rhinolophus hipposideros in Pembrokeshire. It has been designated as a Site of Special Scientific Interest since February 1998 in an attempt to protect its fragile biological elements. The site has an area of 0.01 hectares (0.025 acres) and is managed by Natural Resources Wales.

The stone outbuildings were built during the late nineteenth century when they were used as stables and coach house, being part of the Stackpole Estate owned by the Earl of Cawdor. Today the buildings have been turned into a double garage and a workshop with continuous lofts above.

== Type and features ==
This site is designated due to its biological qualities. SSSIs in Wales have been notified for a total of 142 different animal species and 191 different plant species.

There are only nine roosts for this species in Pembrokeshire and it is very likely that there is an interchange of adults between this population and that at the nearby SSSI at Stackpole Courtyard Flats. In 1987, 32 adult bats were counted but the numbers have been steadily increasing: 85 in 1993, 99 in 1994, 103 in 1995, 102 in 1996, and 141 in 1997.

== See also ==
- List of Sites of Special Scientific Interest in Pembrokeshire
