= Gweunydd Blaencleddau =

Protected area in Pembrokeshire, Wales

- Site of Special Scientific Interest
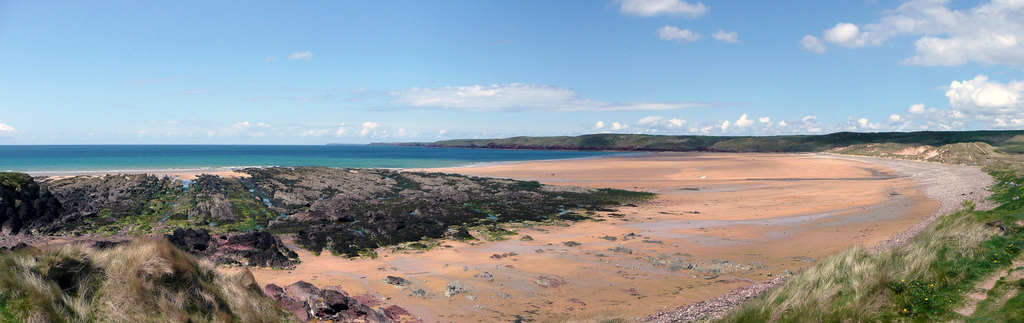
- Freshwater West Panorama

- Location within Wales
- Location of Gweunydd Blaencleddau.
- Area of search: Pembrokeshire
- Grid reference: SN1549931781
- Coordinates: 51.954°N 4.686°W
- Interest: Biological
- Area: 149.5 hectares (1.5 km^{2}; 0.58 sq mi)
- Notification date: 2000

Gweunydd Blaencleddau is a large wetland complex in a shallow south-west valley around the headwaters of the Eastern Cleddau river. It is a Site of Special Scientific Interest (SSSI) and a Special Area of Conservation (SAC) situated in Pembrokeshire, South Wales.

== Site of Special Scientific Interest ==
Gweunydd Blaencleddau is situated at the head of the Eastern Cleddau river, 1.67 miles (2.69 km) south-west of Crymych and covers an area of 149.6 hectares (370 acres) of shallow south-west trending valley between 190 m and 275 m above sea-level. The site was designated an SSSI in 2000 for its biological qualities. It is a mixture of wet heath and damp grassland and has significant populations of the marsh fritillary (Euphydryas aurinia) and the southern damselfly (Coenagrion mercuriale).

== Special Area of Conservation ==
A Special Area of Conservation has also been established around this north-eastern tributary of the Eastern Cleddau river. The site is designated for habitats including calcium-rich springwater-fed fens - Alkaline fens; the southern damselfly (Coenagrion mercuriale); marsh fritillary butterfly Euphydryas (Eurodryas, Hypodryas) aurinia; purple moor-grass meadows - molinia meadows on calcareous, peaty or clayey-silt-laden soils (Molinion caeruleae); wet heathland with cross-leaved heath Rhostiroedd gwlyb - Northern Atlantic wet heaths with Erica tetralix; very wet mires often identified by an unstable 'quaking' surface - transition mires and quaking bogs; and blanket bogs.

== See also ==
- List of Sites of Special Scientific Interest in Pembrokeshire
