= Castlemartin Corse =

Protected area in Pembrokeshire, Wales

- Site of Special Scientific Interest
- Location within Wales
- Location of Castlemartin Corse.
- Area of search: Pembrokeshire
- Grid reference: SR8950499717
- Coordinates: 51.6567°N 5.04461°W
- Interest: Biological
- Area: 30.4 hectares (75 acres)
- Notification date: 1985

Castlemartin Corse is a Site of Special Scientific Interest (or SSSI) in Pembrokeshire, South Wales. It has been designated as a Site of Special Scientific Interest since February 1985 in an attempt to protect its fragile biological elements. The site has an area of 30.4 hectares (75 acres) and is managed by Natural Resources Wales.

== Type ==
This site is designated due to its biological qualities. SSSIs in Wales have been notified for a total of 142 different animal species and 191 different plant species.

The site is the best example of a calcareous fen in Pembrokeshire. The 20 hectare reed-bed is also the largest and most diverse in the county. Calcareous flushes support rare plants and there are numerous scarce fen plants in this SSSI.

Rare species include the yellow-sedge Carex elata, the fen pondweed Potamogeton coloratus, the short-winged conehead cricket Conocephalus dorsalis and the ground-hopper Tetrix subulata.

== See also ==
- List of Sites of Special Scientific Interest in Pembrokeshire
