= Treffgarne Bridge Quarry =

Protected area in Pembrokeshire, Wales

- Site of Special Scientific Interest
- Location within Wales
- Location of Treffgarne Bridge Quarry.
- Area of search: Pembrokeshire
- Grid reference: SM9595722805
- Coordinates: 51.866°N 4.965°W
- Interest: Geological
- Area: 0.4 hectares (0.99 acres)
- Notification date: 1954

Treffgarne Bridge Quarry is a Site of Special Scientific Interest (or SSSI) in Pembrokeshire, South Wales. It has been designated as a Site of Special Scientific Interest since January 1954 in an attempt to protect its fragile geological elements. The site has an area of 0.4 hectares (0.99 acres)and is managed by Natural Resources Wales. The name derives from the Welsh "Trefgarn".

== Type ==
This site is designated due to its geological qualities: Cambrian sedimentary rocks exposed in a disused quarry and road cutting. In Wales, geological sites range from quarries to rocky outcrops and massive sea-cliffs. 30% of SSSIs in Wales are notified for geological and geomorphological features.

The sedimentary rocks have yielded a variety of fossils that indicate that the rocks were formed around 490 million years ago and therefore provide a means of correlation with other key sites such as those in North Wales and Shropshire.

== See also ==
- List of Sites of Special Scientific Interest in Pembrokeshire
