= Minwear Wood =

Protected area in Pembrokeshire, Wales

- Site of Special Scientific Interest
- Location within Wales
- Location of Minwear Wood.
- Area of search: Pembrokeshire
- Grid reference: SN0372513733
- Coordinates: 51.788°N 4.847°W
- Interest: Biological
- Area: 13.69 hectares (33.8 acres)
- Notification date: 1968

Minwear Wood is a Site of Special Scientific Interest (or SSSI) in Pembrokeshire, South Wales. It has been designated as a Site of Special Scientific Interest since January 1968 in an attempt to protect its fragile biological elements including ancient woodland of sessile oak (Quercus petraea) with hazel (Corylus avellana) and downy birch (Betula pubescens) on the upper part of the Milford Haven estuary. The wood is structurally diverse and has scarce plants and epiphytic lichens. The site has an area of 13.69 hectares (33.8 acres) and is managed by Natural Resources Wales.

== Type and features ==
This site is designated due to its biological qualities. SSSIs in Wales have been notified for a total of 142 different animal species and 191 different plant species.

This predominantly sessile oakwood on red marls of the Old Red Sandstone and Silurian mudstones, is a remnant of a once older and larger woodland at Minwear described in Elizabethan times as a “great wood or forest”.

Scarce plants include: the hay-scented buckler-fern (Dryopteris aemula) and wood spurge (Euphorbia amygdaloides), the wild service tree (Sorbus torminalis), crab apple (Malus sylvestris) and aspen (Populus tremula). The 70 different epiphytic lichens found include: Phyllopsora rosei, the pollution-sensitive Lobaria pulmonaria. Around 85 different mosses and liverworts are found in this site including Nowellia curvifolia.

== See also ==
- List of Sites of Special Scientific Interest in Pembrokeshire
