= Allt Pontfaen - Coed Gelli-fawr =

Protected area in Pembrokeshire, Wales

- Site of Special Scientific Interest
- Location within Wales
- Location of Allt Pontfaen - Coed Gelli-fawr.
- Area of search: Pembrokeshire
- Grid reference: SN0446134530
- Coordinates: 51.974744°N 4.8483302°W
- Interest: Biological
- Area: 73.12 ha (180.7 acres)
- Notification date: 1954

Allt Pontfaen - Coed Gelli-fawr is a Site of Special Scientific Interest (or SSSI) in Pembrokeshire, South Wales which starts at Allt Pontfaen and finishes at Coed Gelli-fawr. It has been designated as a Site of Special Scientific Interest since January 1954 in an attempt to protect its fragile biological elements. The site has an area of 73.12 hectares and is managed by Natural Resources Wales.

== Type ==
This site is designated due to its biological qualities. SSSIs in Wales have been notified for a total of 142 different animal species and 191 different plant species.

The site is described by Natural Resources Wales as containing: "Six contiguous ancient semi-natural woodlands situated on the steep slopes of the south side of the Gwaun Valley sub-glacial meltwater channel. The rich epiphytic lichen flora is of national importance, featuring many old forest species. Several notable woodland plants and invertebrates occur. Dormice are also present."

== See also ==
- List of Sites of Special Scientific Interest in Pembrokeshire
