= Dyffryn Gwaun =

Protected area in Pembrokeshire, Wales

- Site of Special Scientific Interest
- Location within Wales
- Location of Dyffryn Gwaun.
- Area of search: Pembrokeshire
- Grid reference: SN0509634837
- Coordinates: 51.977723°N 4.8392718°W
- Interest: Biological
- Area: 25.36 ha (62.7 acres)
- Notification date: 1954

Dyffryn Gwaun is a Site of Special Scientific Interest (SSSI) in Pembrokeshire, South Wales. It has been designated as a Site of Special Scientific Interest since January 1954 in an attempt to protect its fragile biological elements. The site has an area of 25.36 hectares and is managed by Natural Resources Wales.

== Type and features ==
This site is designated due to its biological qualities. SSSIs in Wales have been notified for a total of 142 different animal species and 191 different plant species.

This site has 3 special features.

- Woodland (semi-natural broadleaf)
- Marshy grassland
- Lichens typical of ancient woodland

The site has other habitats that contribute to the special wildlife interest including swamp and running water which support a wide range of species such as: otter, scarce flies and beetles.

== See also ==
- List of Sites of Special Scientific Interest in Pembrokeshire
