= Waun Fawr, Puncheston =

Protected area in Pembrokeshire, Wales

- Site of Special Scientific Interest
- Location within Wales
- Location of Waun Fawr, Puncheston.
- Area of search: Pembrokeshire
- Grid reference: SN0171230334
- Coordinates: 51.936°N 4.886°W
- Interest: Biological
- Area: 8.26 hectares (20.4 acres)
- Notification date: 1995

Waun Fawr, Puncheston is a Site of Special Scientific Interest (or SSSI) in Pembrokeshire, South Wales. It has been designated as a Site of Special Scientific Interest since March 1995 in an attempt to protect its fragile biological elements. The site has an area of 8.26 hectares (20.4 acres).

== Type ==
This site is designated due to its biological qualities. SSSIs in Wales have been notified for a total of 142 different animal species and 191 different plant species.

The site is of special interest for its population of the internationally rare southern damselfly (Coenagrion mercuriale), which breeds in this small valley near Afon Anghof, above Puncheston. A number of springs and streams support a large population of the damselfly. Amongst the abundant wetland plants is a population of the pale butterwort (Pinguicula lusitanica).

== See also ==
- List of Sites of Special Scientific Interest in Pembrokeshire
