= Wallis Moor =

Protected area in Pembrokeshire, Wales

- Site of Special Scientific Interest
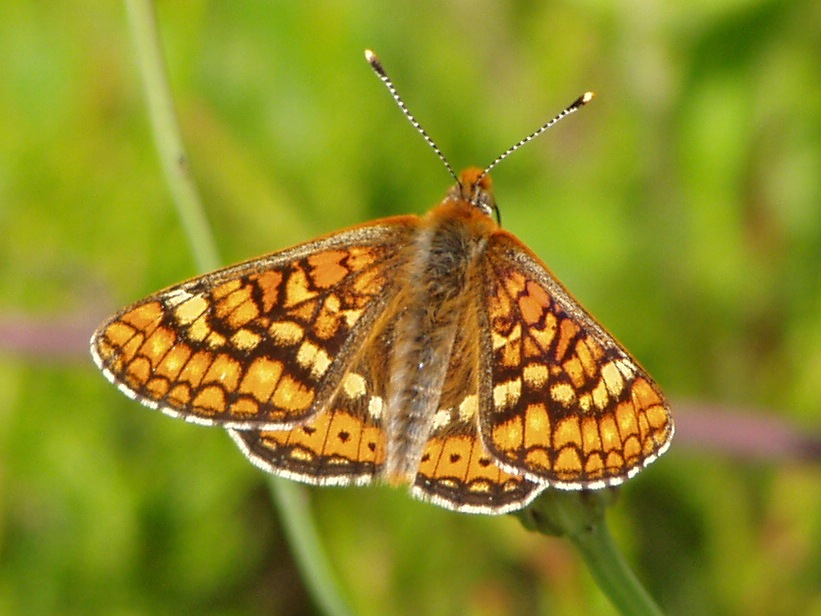
- The scarce marsh fritillary butterfly (Eurodryas aurinia)

- Location within Wales
- Location of Wallis Moor.
- Area of search: Pembrokeshire
- Grid reference: SN0140126264
- Coordinates: 51.899435°N 4.888047°W
- Interest: Biological
- Area: 63.22 ha
- Notification date: 1998

Wallis Moor is a Site of Special Scientific Interest (or SSSI) 12 km to the north of Haverfordwest near the village of Ambleston in Pembrokeshire, South Wales. It has been designated as a Site of Special Scientific Interest since March 1998 in an attempt to protect its fragile biological elements. The site has an area of 63.22 hectares and is managed by Natural Resources Wales.

== Type ==
This site is designated due to its biological qualities, especially its wet heath and marshy grassland. It also has an important population of the nationally scarce marsh fritillary butterfly (Eurodryas aurinia).

== See also ==
- List of Sites of Special Scientific Interest in Pembrokeshire
