= Dwrhyd Pit =

Protected area in Pembrokeshire, Wales

- Site of Special Scientific Interest
- Location within Wales Location within the United Kingdom
- Location of Dwrhyd Pit.
- Area of search: Pembrokeshire
- Grid reference: SM7916624778
- Coordinates: 51.877°N 5.210°W
- Interest: Geological
- Area: 0.18 hectares (0.44 acres)
- Notification date: 1957

Dwrhyd Pit is a Site of Special Scientific Interest (or SSSI) in Pembrokeshire, South Wales. It has been designated as a Site of Special Scientific Interest since January 1957 in an attempt to protect its fragile geological elements. The site has an area of 0.18 hectares (0.44 acres) and is managed by Natural Resources Wales.

== Type and features ==
This site is designated due to its geological qualities. In Wales, geological sites range from quarries to rocky outcrops and massive sea-cliffs. 30% of SSSIs in Wales are notified for geological and geomorphological features.

Dwrhyd Pit is exceptionally rich in fossils and gives a most valuable insight into the life which existed during Middle Cambrian times (515 million years ago). Amongst these are trilobites and brachiopods. These fossils have allowed this section to be correlated with rocks of a similar age in North Wales, the Welsh Borders and Scandinavia. The site is also of great value in expanding our knowledge of the Cambrian System as a whole.

== See also ==
- List of Sites of Special Scientific Interest in Pembrokeshire
