= Marloes Mere =

Protected wetland in Pembrokeshire, Wales

- Site of Special Scientific Interest
- Location within Wales
- Location of Marloes Mere.
- Area of search: Pembrokeshire
- Grid reference: SM7751308213
- Coordinates: 51.728°N 5.223°W
- Interest: Biological
- Area: 17.17 hectares (42.4 acres)
- Notification date: 1985

Marloes Mere is a wetland in Pembrokeshire, South Wales. It has been designated as a Site of Special Scientific Interest since November 1985 in an attempt to protect its fragile biological elements. The site has an area of 17.17 hectares (42.4 acres) and is managed by Natural Resources Wales.

== Type ==
This site is notable for its wet acidic vegetation. It lies in a hollow on the Marloes peninsula lined with glacial silt and clay and each winter the pasture floods. Such pasture is rare in West Wales. Scarce plants occur and the shallow winter waters and ponds are frequented by waterfowl. The mere was common land until 1811; at that time Richard Fenton mentioned that it abounded in medicinal leeches (Hirudo medicinalis), from which the villagers derived a considerable trade.

== Rare species ==
Rare plants include:

- Three-lobed crowfoot (Ranunculus tripartitus)
- Tubular water-dropwort (Oenanthe fistulosa) growing on the margins of the ditches, reservoirs and pools
- Wintering wildfowl include wigeon, shoveler, pintail, teal and mallard
- The great green bush-cricket (Tettigonia viridissima), and the marsh fritillary butterfly (Euphydryas aurinia)
- Six dragonflies including the emperor dragonfly (Anax imperator).

== See also ==
- List of Sites of Special Scientific Interest in Pembrokeshire
