= Wyndrush Pastures =

Protected area in Pembrokeshire, Wales

- Site of Special Scientific Interest
- Location within Wales
- Location of Wyndrush Pastures.
- Area of search: Pembrokeshire
- Grid reference: SN0904303884
- Coordinates: 51.701°N 4.765°W
- Interest: Biological
- Area: 45.5 hectares (112 acres)
- Notification date: 1999

Wyndrush Pastures is a Site of Special Scientific Interest (or SSSI) south-east of the village of Redberth, just south of the A477, and around five km (3.1 mi) to the north-west of the coastal town of Tenby in Pembrokeshire, South Wales. It has been designated as a Site of Special Scientific Interest since October 1999 in an attempt to protect its fragile biological elements. The site has an area of 45.5 hectares (112 acres) and is managed by Natural Resources Wales.

== Type ==
This site is designated due to its biological qualities. SSSIs in Wales have been notified for a total of 142 different animal species and 191 different plant species.

It is of special interest for its areas of neutral and marshy grassland communities, which are set amongst areas of broadleaved woodland, interspersed with smaller areas of dry acidic grassland and tall-herb fen.

== See also ==
- List of Sites of Special Scientific Interest in Pembrokeshire
