= Hook Wood =

Protected area in Pembrokeshire, Wales

- Site of Special Scientific Interest
- Location within Wales
- Location of Hook Wood.
- Area of search: Pembrokeshire
- Grid reference: SM9702411510
- Coordinates: 51.765381°N 4.9429209°W
- Interest: Biological
- Area: 12.02 ha (29.7 acres)
- Notification date: 1986

Hook Wood is a Site of Special Scientific Interest (or SSSI) in Pembrokeshire, South Wales. In 1603 George Owen described Hook Wood as one of “the best standing woods” of Pembrokeshire. It has been designated as a Site of Special Scientific Interest since January 1986 in an attempt to protect its fragile biological elements. The site has an area of 12.02 hectares and is managed by Natural Resources Wales. SSSIs in Wales have been notified of a total of 142 different animal species and 191 different plant species.

== Type and features ==
This is an ancient estuarine woodland of sessile oak Quercus petraea on the steep outer banks of the Western Cleddau estuary. More than 130 plants have been recorded, and this site is one of the most diverse of the oakwoods on the rocky shorelines of Milford Haven.

The woodland canopy is predominantly coppice of sessile oak which varies from about 15 metres on the upper slope to around 4 metres on the low cliffs below. A detailed estate map by Thomas Lewis in 1776, shows that the extent of the wood since that time has been kept.

== See also ==
- List of Sites of Special Scientific Interest in Pembrokeshire
