= Cwm Bach, Sychpant =

Protected area in Pembrokeshire, Wales

- Site of Special Scientific Interest
- Location within Wales
- Location of Cwm Bach, Sychpant.
- Area of search: Pembrokeshire
- Grid reference: SN0445735139
- Coordinates: 51.980°N 4.849°W
- Interest: Biological
- Area: 8.67 hectares (21.4 acres)
- Notification date: 1989

Cwm Bach, Sychpant is a Site of Special Scientific Interest (or "SSSI") in Pembrokeshire, South Wales. It has been designated as a Site of Special Scientific Interest since February 1989 in an attempt to protect its fragile biological elements. The site has an area of 8.67 hectares (21.4 acres) and is managed by Natural Resources Wales.

== Type ==
This site is designated due to its biological qualities. SSSIs in Wales have been notified for a total of 142 different animal species and 191 different plant species. The site has an unusually high number of different butterfly species found around the bracken.

The woodland areas of the site are particularly important for lichens typical of ancient woodland.

== See also ==
- List of Sites of Special Scientific Interest in Pembrokeshire
