= Portheiddy Moor =

Protected area in Pembrokeshire, Wales

- Site of Special Scientific Interest
- Location within Wales
- Location of Portheiddy Moor.
- Area of search: Pembrokeshire
- Grid reference: SM8039231340
- Coordinates: 51.937°N 5.196°W
- Interest: Biological
- Area: 9.5 hectares (23 acres)
- Notification date: 1987

Portheiddy Moor is a Site of Special Scientific Interest (or SSSI) a little to the east of Abereiddy in Pembrokeshire, South Wales. It has been designated as a Site of Special Scientific Interest since July 1987 in an attempt to protect its fragile biological elements: a "diverse example of grazed fen-meadow with springs, swamp and tall fen amongst extensive flushed communities". The site has an area of 9.5 hectares (23 acres) and is managed by Natural Resources Wales.

== Type ==
This site is designated due to its biological qualities: Marsh orchids (Dactylorhiza incarnata) are exceptionally abundant. SSSIs in Wales have been notified for a total of 142 different animal species and 191 different plant species. Scarce plants include fewflower spikerush (Eleocharis quinqueflora) and marsh arrowgrass (Triglochin palustris).

Portheiddy Moor lies on the sloping southern side of the valley separating Barry Island from the mainland. The valley is known as the "Abereiddi meltwater channel", and is a product of sub-glacial meltwater erosion during the Ice Ages.

== See also ==
- List of Sites of Special Scientific Interest in Pembrokeshire
