= Dowrog Common =

Protected area in Pembrokeshire, Wales

- Site of Special Scientific Interest
- Location within Wales
- Location of Dowrog Common.
- Area of search: Pembrokeshire
- Grid reference: SM7720027041
- Coordinates: 51.897°N 5.240°W
- Interest: Biological
- Area: 100.86 hectares (249.2 acres)
- Notification date: 1954

Dowrog Common (Welsh: Comin Dowrog) is a Site of Special Scientific Interest (or SSSI) in Pembrokeshire, South Wales. It has been designated as a Site of Special Scientific Interest since January 1954 in an attempt to protect its fragile biological elements. The site has an area of 0.18 hectares (0.44 acres) and is managed by The Wildlife Trust of South & West Wales.

== Features ==
This site is designated due to its biological qualities. SSSIs in Wales have been notified for a total of 142 different animal species and 191 different plant species.

This site has eight special features:

- Fen
- Swamp
- Marshy Grassland
- Wet Heath
- Dry Heath
- Floating Water Plantain
- Rare Plants
- Small Red Damselfly

== See also ==
- List of Sites of Special Scientific Interest in Pembrokeshire
