= Newport Cliffs =

Protected area in Pembrokeshire, Wales

- Site of Special Scientific Interest
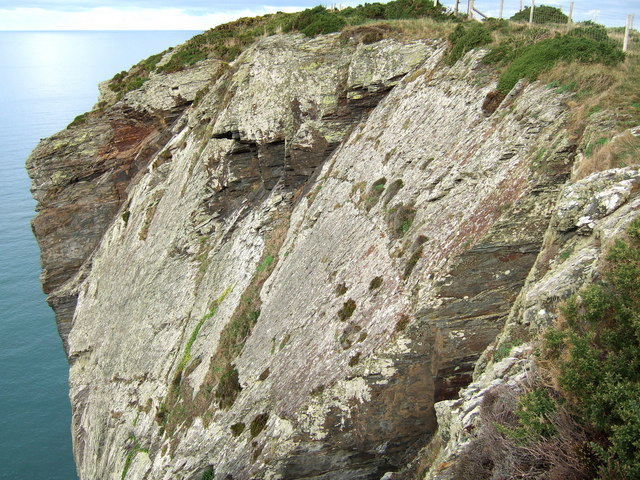

- Location within Wales
- Location of Newport Cliffs.
- Area of search: Pembrokeshire
- Grid reference: SN0499441943
- Coordinates: 52.041°N 4.845°W
- Interest: Biological
- Area: 48.23 hectares (119.2 acres)
- Notification date: 1954

Newport Cliffs is a Site of Special Scientific Interest (or SSSI) lying a little to the north of Newport in Pembrokeshire, South Wales. It has been designated as a Site of Special Scientific Interest since January 1954 in an attempt to protect its fragile biological elements. The site has an area of 48.23 hectares (119.2 acres) and is managed by Natural Resources Wales.

== Type and features ==
This site is designated due to its biological qualities. SSSIs in Wales have been notified for a total of 142 different animal species and 191 different plant species.

This site has four special features.

- Sea cliffs and associated ledges and crevices
- Coastal grassland
- Coastal heathland
- Perennial centaury

The site has other habitats and species that contribute to the wildlife interest including cliff-nesting chough, peregrine falcons, and razorbill. Rare plants include: royal fern, sea spleenwort and sea purslane.

== See also ==
- List of Sites of Special Scientific Interest in Pembrokeshire
