= Corsydd Llangloffan =

Protected area in Pembrokeshire, Wales

- Site of Special Scientific Interest
- Location within Wales
- Location of Corsydd Llangloffan.
- Area of search: Pembrokeshire
- Grid reference: SM905318
- Coordinates: 51.9447°N 5.0498°W
- Interest: Biological
- Area: 56.7 hectares (140 acres)
- Notification date: 1992

Corsydd Llangloffan is a Site of Special Scientific Interest (or SSSI) in Pembrokeshire, South Wales. It has been designated as a Site of Special Scientific Interest since February 1992 to try to protect its fragile biological elements. The site has an area of 56.7 hectares (140 acres) and is managed by Natural Resources Wales.

== Type ==
This site is designated due to its biological qualities. SSSIs in Wales have been notified for a total of 142 different animal species and 191 different plant species.

Corsydd Llangloffan SSSI is within the Cleddau Rivers Special Area of Conservation (cSAC) for otter, bullhead, river lamprey, brook lamprey, sea lamprey and water crowfoot. Breeding birds include barn owl, song thrush, spotted flycatcher, linnet, Eurasian bullfinch and reed bunting.
