= Jeffreyston Pastures =

Protected area in Pembrokeshire, Wales

- Site of Special Scientific Interest
- Location within Wales
- Location of Jeffreyston Pastures.
- Area of search: Pembrokeshire
- Grid reference: SN0886105912
- Coordinates: 51.719275°N 4.7685256°W
- Interest: Biological
- Area: 15.72 hectares (38.8 acres)
- Notification date: 1996

Jeffreyston Pastures is a Site of Special Scientific Interest (or SSSI) in Pembrokeshire, South Wales. It has been designated as a Site of Special Scientific Interest since January 1996 in an attempt to protect its fragile biological elements. The site has an area of 15.72 hectares (38.8 acres) and is managed by Natural Resources Wales.

== Type ==
This site is designated due to its biological qualities. SSSIs in Wales have been notified for a total of 142 different animal species and 191 different plant species.

== See also ==
- List of Sites of Special Scientific Interest in Pembrokeshire
