= Cresswell Castle =

Castle in Pembrokeshire, Wales

Coordinates: 51.728°N 4.826°W

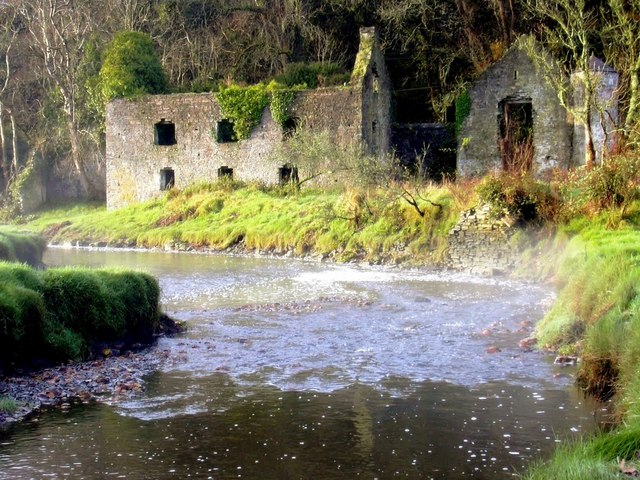
Cresswell Castle in Pembrokeshire, west Wales

Cresswell Castle is a castle half a mile north of the village of Cresswell Quay, Pembrokeshire, west Wales. It is situated on the banks of the River Cresswell in what is currently private land. The buildings were originally a 13th-century stone fortified manorial complex, founded by the Augustinian Priory of Haverfordwest.

== History ==
Cresswell Castle is thought to date back to the thirteenth century but has seen many alterations since, particularly in the sixteenth and seventeenth centuries. It originally had some defensive adaptations but in its later guise had a more domestic function. It seems to have been abandoned in the latter part of the seventeenth century.

== The site ==
Cresswell Castle consists of a range of three buildings set along the perimeter of a courtyard. It was originally a fortified manorial complex and has undergone substantial alterations over the years. The castle overlooks the River Cresswell at its highest navigable point. The courtyard is rectangular in shape, about 30 by 20 m (100 by 70 ft), and is surrounded by a curtain wall with a small circular tower at each corner. The largest of these towers was built as a dovecote. During the sixteenth century, the Barlows of Slebech converted the castle into a manor house with stables, gardens and fishponds.

== Visitor information ==
The castle is located inside the Pembrokeshire Coast National Park, three miles north of Carew Castle and eight miles south of Llawhaden Castle. It can be approached by Millway Lane, a turning off the A4075, the Canaston Bridge to Pembroke road. The property is close to the minor road on private land beside the River Cresswell, but is visible from the road where there is room for a few cars to park.
