= Arfordir Abereiddi =

Protected area in Pembrokeshire, Wales

- Site of Special Scientific Interest
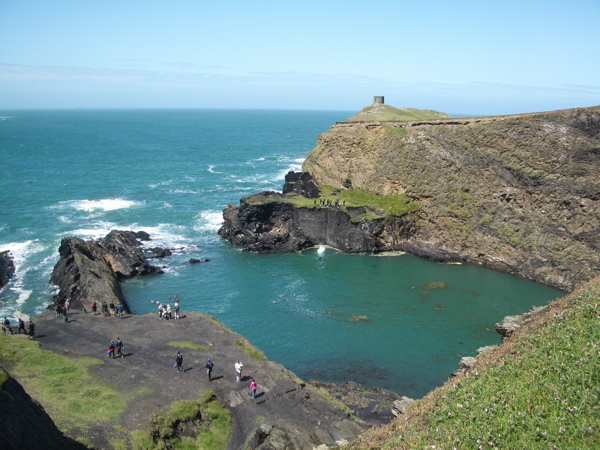
- Part of site, including the lagoon

- Location within Wales
- Location of Arfordir Abereiddi.
- Area of search: Pembrokeshire
- Grid reference: SM7965531099
- Coordinates: 51.934662°N 5.2067117°W
- Interest: Biological and Geological
- Area: 63.74 ha (157.5 acres)
- Notification date: 2002

Arfordir Abereiddi is a Site of Special Scientific Interest (SSSI) in Pembrokeshire, South Wales. It has been designated as a Site of Special Scientific Interest since January 2002 in an attempt to protect its fragile biological and geological elements. The site has an area of 63.74 hectares and is managed by Natural Resources Wales.

== Type and features ==
This SSSI has been notified as being of both geological and biological importance. The following features have been noted as Special Scientific Interest:

1. Littoral Rock (Reef)
2. Sea caves
3. Saline Lagoon
4. Grey seal (Halichoerus grypus)
5. Arenig – Llanvirn GCR block
6. Ordovician Igneous GCR block

== See also ==
- List of Sites of Special Scientific Interest in Pembrokeshire
- Abereiddy
