= River Cleddau =

River in west Wales

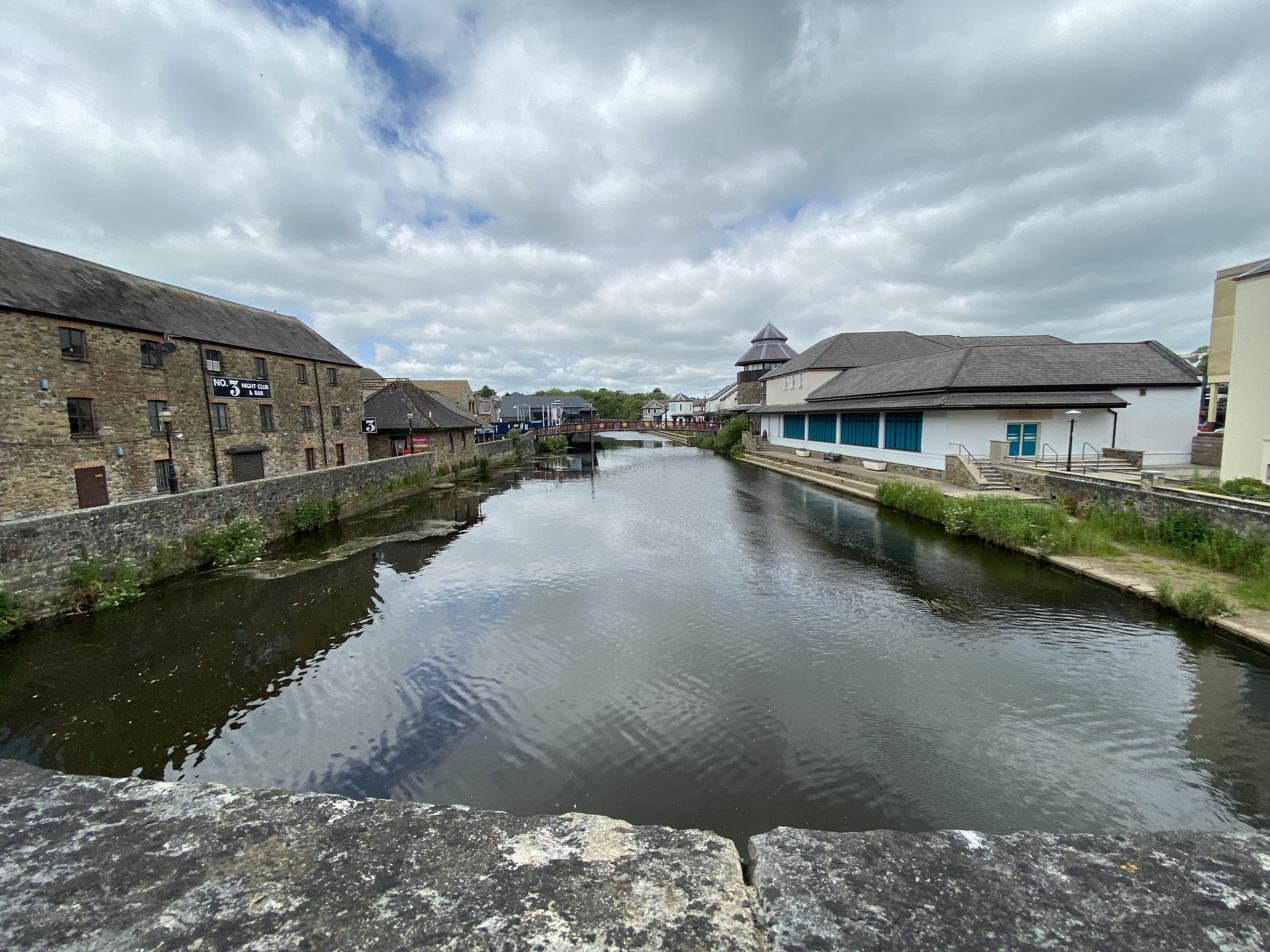
- The Western Cleddau in Haverfordwest Town Centre
- Native name: Afon Cleddau (Welsh)

Location
- Country: Wales
- County: Pembrokeshire

Physical characteristics
- Source: Western Cleddau
  - location: Penysgwarne, Pembrokeshire
- 2nd source: Eastern Cleddau
  - location: Waun Cleddau, Preseli Hills, Pembrokeshire
- Mouth: Celtic Sea
  - location: Milford Haven, Pembrokeshire

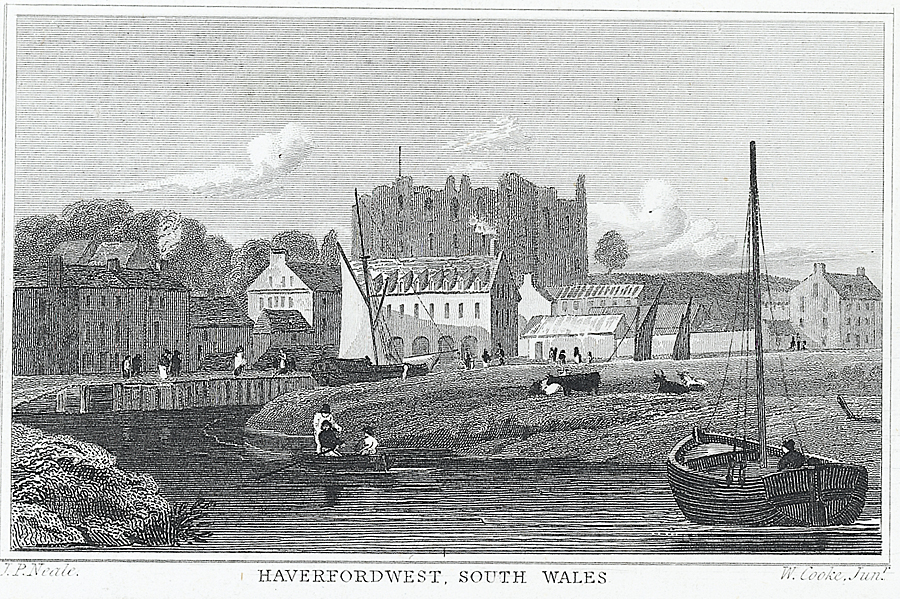
The Western Cleddau at Haverfordwest

The River Cleddau (Welsh: Afon Cleddau) consists of the Eastern and Western Cleddau rivers in Pembrokeshire, west Wales. They unite to form the Daugleddau estuary and the harbour of Milford Haven Waterway.

The name of the combined estuary – the Daugleddau – means “the two Cleddaus”. The name Cleddau, whilst seeming to be a plural ('-au' generally denotes plurality in Welsh) comes from the Welsh word cleddyf meaning 'sword' and refers perhaps to the manner in which both rivers are incised into the landscape of Pembrokeshire. A number of former Anglican parishes in the area have been combined to form the modern Church in Wales parish of Daugleddau in the Diocese of St Davids.

== Eastern Cleddau ==
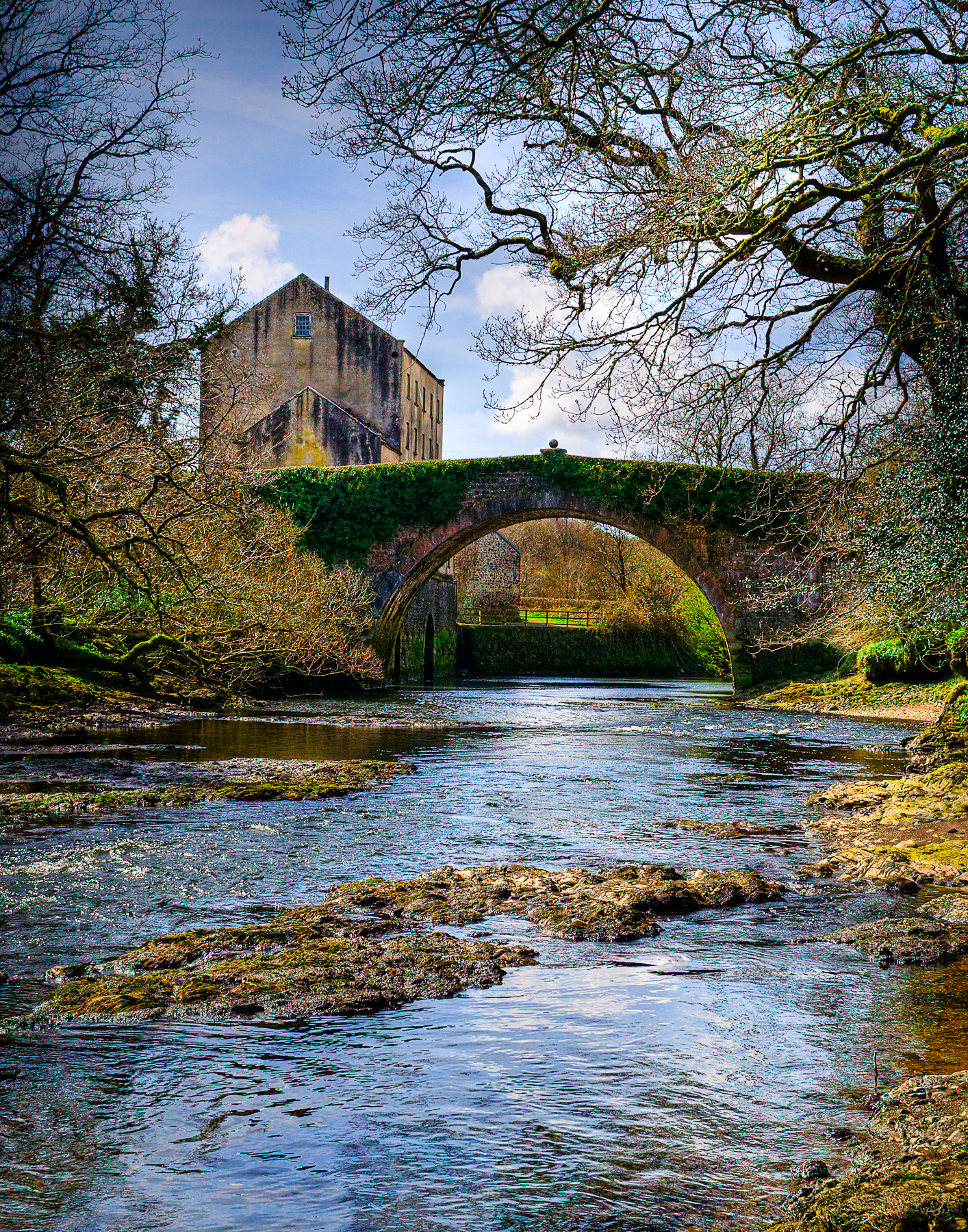
The Eastern Cleddau at Blackpool Mill

The Eastern Cleddau (Welsh: Cleddau Ddu meaning 'black') rises in the foothills of Preseli Mountains at Blaencleddau in the parish of Mynachlog-ddu. It flows southwest through a broad moorland valley to Gelli Hill, where the River Syfynwy joins it. It then flows south through a deep valley past Llawhaden and becomes tidal at Canaston Bridge, the lowest crossing point. The estuary joins that of the Western Cleddau at Picton Point. Its length is about 34 km, of which about 7 km is tidal.

== Western Cleddau ==
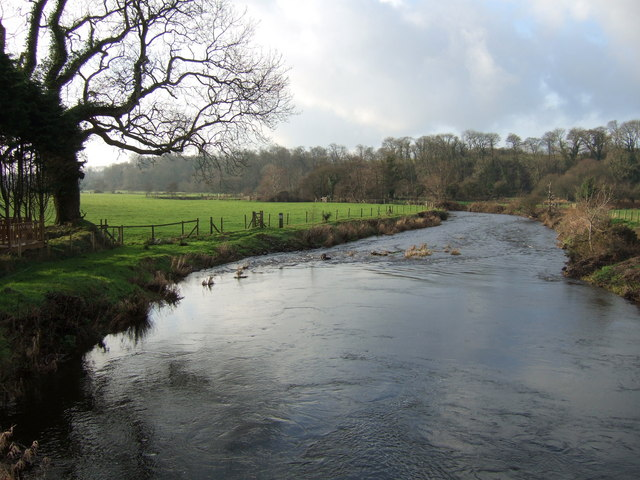
The Western Cleddau at St Catherine's Bridge

The Western Cleddau (Welsh: Cleddau Wen meaning 'white') has two branches: the eastern branch rises at Llygad Cleddau in the parish of Llanfair Nant y Gôf, 4 km south-east of Fishguard. It flows southwest past Scleddau, and meets the western branch at Priskilly. The western branch rises at Penysgwarne in the parish of Llanreithan and flows east to Priskilly. The combined stream flows through Wolf's Castle, where it enters the 90 m deep Treffgarne gorge, cutting through the hard volcanic rocks of Treffgarne Mountain. It then flows south to Haverfordwest, where it becomes tidal, this being the lowest bridge crossing. The tidal estuary expands into a deep ria, and unites with the Eastern Cleddau estuary at Picton Point, to form the Daugleddau estuary. Its length (Penysgwarne to Picton Point) is about 40 km, of which about 9 km is tidal.

The Western Cleddau is an example of a underfit stream: the valley is deep, although the stream that flows in it is small. The valley was formed at the end of the last Ice Age, when the River Teifi, swollen with melt waters, was prevented from flowing into the Irish Sea by an ice dam, and flowed instead westward through the valleys of the Nevern and Gwaun, then south along the course of the Western Cleddau.

Historically, the tidal estuary enabled sea traffic to reach Haverfordwest. It was important also for the export of anthracite, which was mined on its west bank and shipped from Hook.

== Daugleddau Estuary and Milford Haven ==
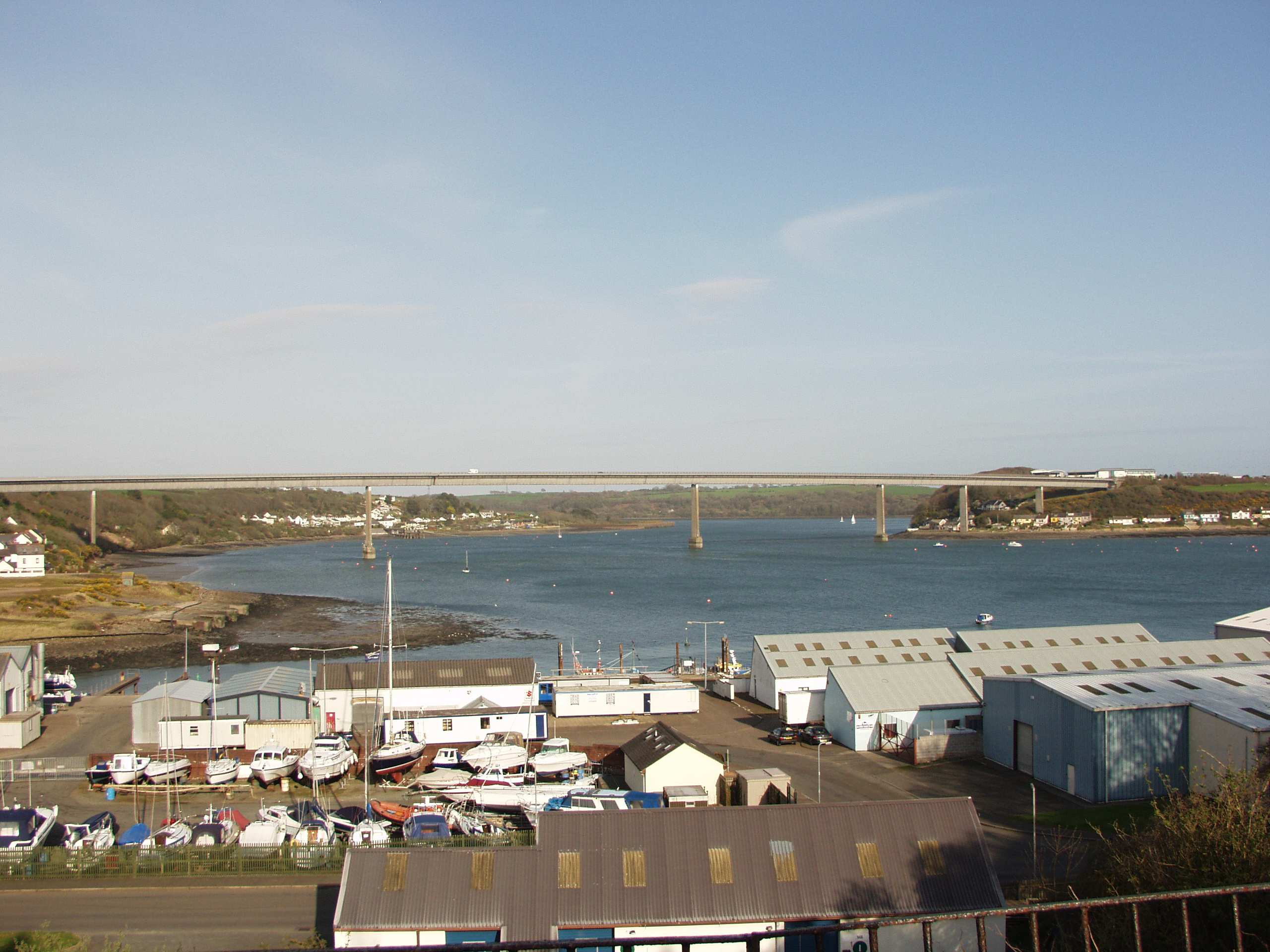
Cleddau Bridge viewed from Neyland

The combined estuary—the Daugleddau—from Picton Point to the Blockhouses guarding the harbour entrance, is a massive ria which is deep and wide, but sufficiently serpentine to be sheltered from high winds and rough seas, and is thus an excellent natural harbour. Because it can easily accommodate supertankers of 300,000 tonnes and more, it became an important centre of the oil industry from 1957 onwards, with Esso, BP, Texaco, Gulf Oil and Amoco operating terminals and oil refineries. In the mid-1970s, it became briefly the UK's second biggest port in terms of tonnage. The Daugleddau and its several tributary tidal reaches are known collectively as Milford Haven. Its length (from Picton Point to the Blockhouses) is about 27 km.

Historically, the estuary gave seaborne access to castles such as Pembroke and Carew, allowing these to be used as depots in the Norman invasion of Ireland. It was important in the early Industrial Revolution, shipping anthracite from Llangwm, Landshipping and Crescelly, and limestone from Lawrenny and West Williamston. A small fishing industry operated from harbours such as Pill, Angle and Dale, but in 1790 the building of the new town of Milford commenced, and a large herring fishery grew up based on its docks. In its heyday, it became the UK's seventh largest fishing port, operating several hundred fishing trawlers, but with exhaustion of inshore fishing grounds, the docks were too small for large ocean-going trawlers, and fishing is now virtually totally non-existent. Milford was originally built for a naval dockyard, but this project was transferred in 1814 to Pembroke Dock on the opposite side of the estuary, where it operated until closure in 1926. The town of Neyland, originally known as New Milford, was also purpose-built, this time by the Great Western Railway as a transatlantic shipping terminal. Its functions were largely transferred to Fishguard in the early 20th century.

== Ecology ==
Both branches of the Cleddau are noteworthy for their diverse aquatic ecology that has been largely untouched by man's activities. The rivers support otter populations and a wide variety of fish species including Lampreys. Stretches of both rivers have been designated as SSSIs because they are of special interest primarily for important populations of otter Lutra lutra, bullhead Cottus gobio, river lamprey Lampetra fluviatilis and brook lamprey Lampetra planeri. They are also of special interest for sea lamprey Petromyzon marinus; for the range of river habitats including beds of submerged aquatic plants often dominated by water-crowfoot Ranunculus spp., as well as a variety of associated riverside habitats.

The Cleddau rivers are also a Special Area of Conservation designated for the European bullhead (Cottus gobio), European river lamprey (Lampetra fluviatilis), Brook lamprey (Lampetra planeri), Otter (Lutra lutra), Sea lamprey (Petromyzon marinus); rivers with floating vegetation often dominated by water-crowfoot (watercourses of plain to montane levels with the Ranunculion fluitantis and Callitricho-Batrachionvegetation); active raised bogs; and Alder woodlands on floodplains (Alluvial forests with Alnus glutinosa and Fraxinus excelsior (Alno-Padion, Alnion incanae, Salicion albae)).

Additionally, land around a north-eastern tributary of the Eastern Cleddau, Gweunydd Blaencleddau, is designated as a Special Area of Conservation for habitats including: calcium-rich springwater-fed fens - Alkaline fens; the southern damselfly (Coenagrion mercuriale), marsh fritillary butterfly Euphydryas (Eurodryas, Hypodryas) aurinia; purple moor-grass meadows - molinia meadows on calcareous, peaty or clayey-silt-laden soils (Molinion caeruleae); wet heathland with cross-leaved heath Rhostiroedd gwlyb – Northern Atlantic wet heaths with Erica tetralix; very wet mires often identified by an unstable 'quaking' surface – transition mires and quaking bogs; and blanket bogs.

== See also ==
- Dungleddy, an ancient hundred whose name continues in the present day as Daugleddau
