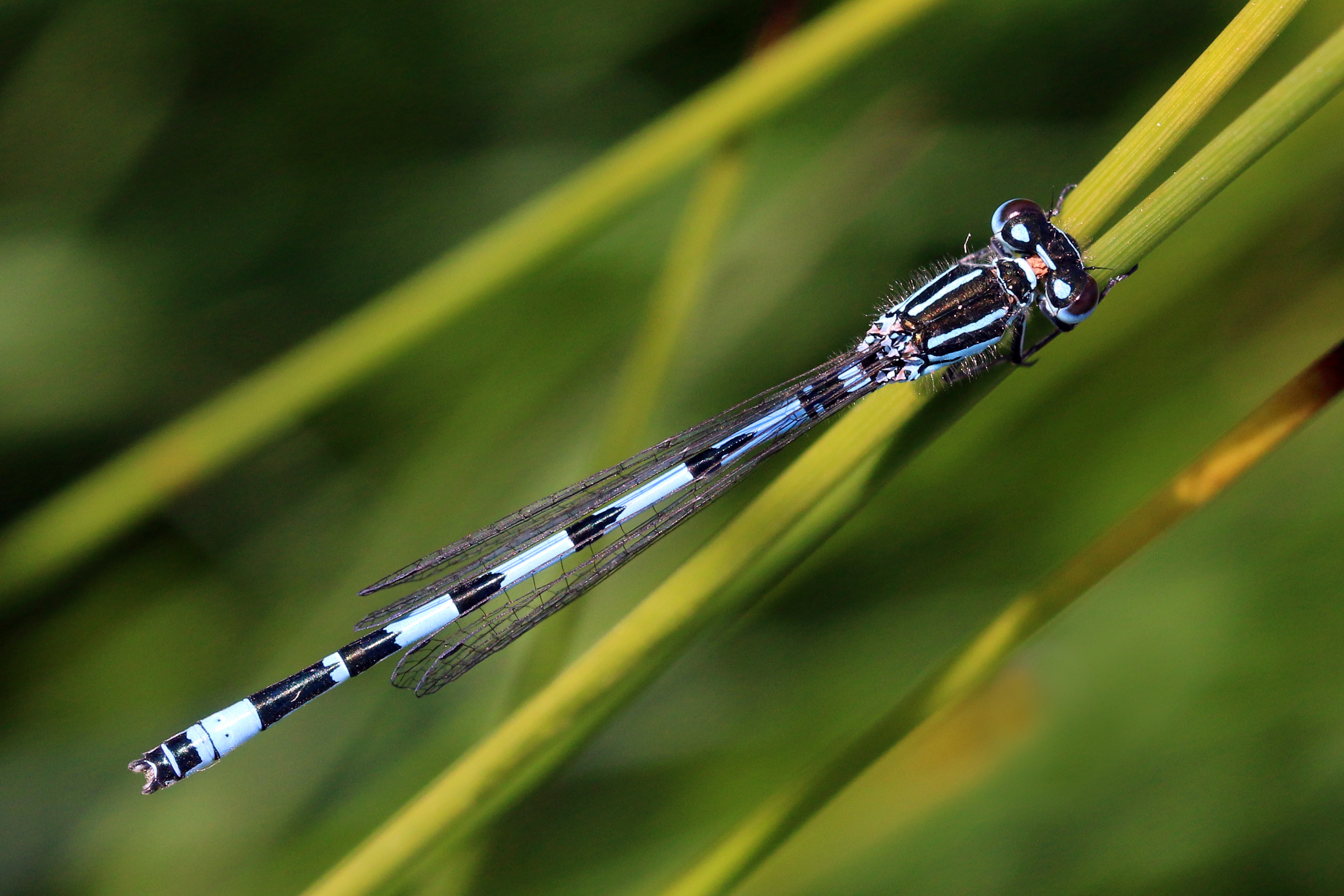
- Male, Parsonage Moor, Oxfordshire
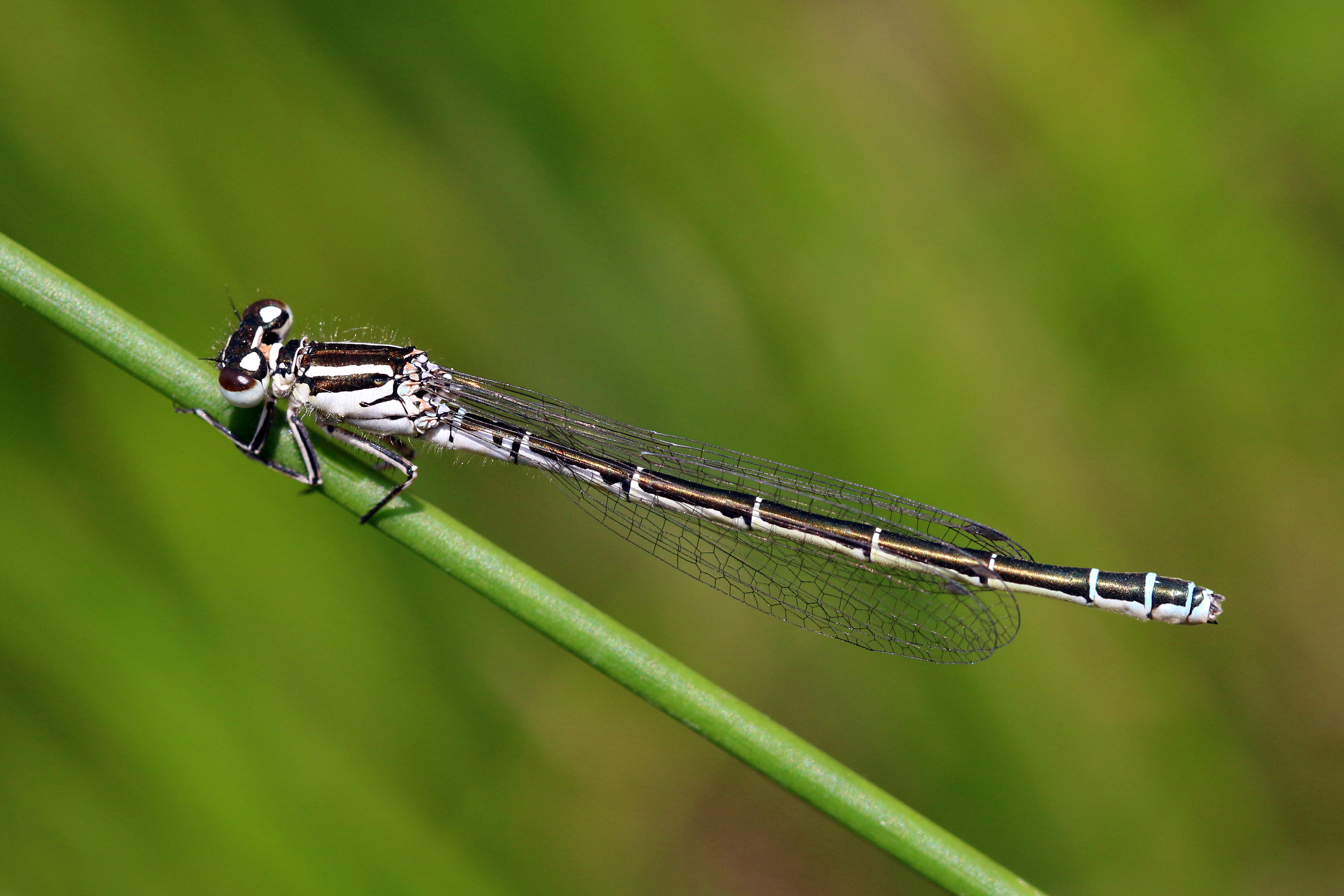
- Female, Dry Sandford Pit, Oxfordshire

Conservation status
- Vulnerable (IUCN 3.1)

Scientific classification
- Kingdom: Animalia
- Phylum: Arthropoda
- Clade: Pancrustacea
- Class: Insecta
- Order: Odonata
- Suborder: Zygoptera
- Family: Coenagrionidae
- Genus: Coenagrion
- Species: C. mercuriale

Binomial name
- Coenagrion mercuriale (Charpentier, 1840)

= Coenagrion mercuriale =

Species of damselfly

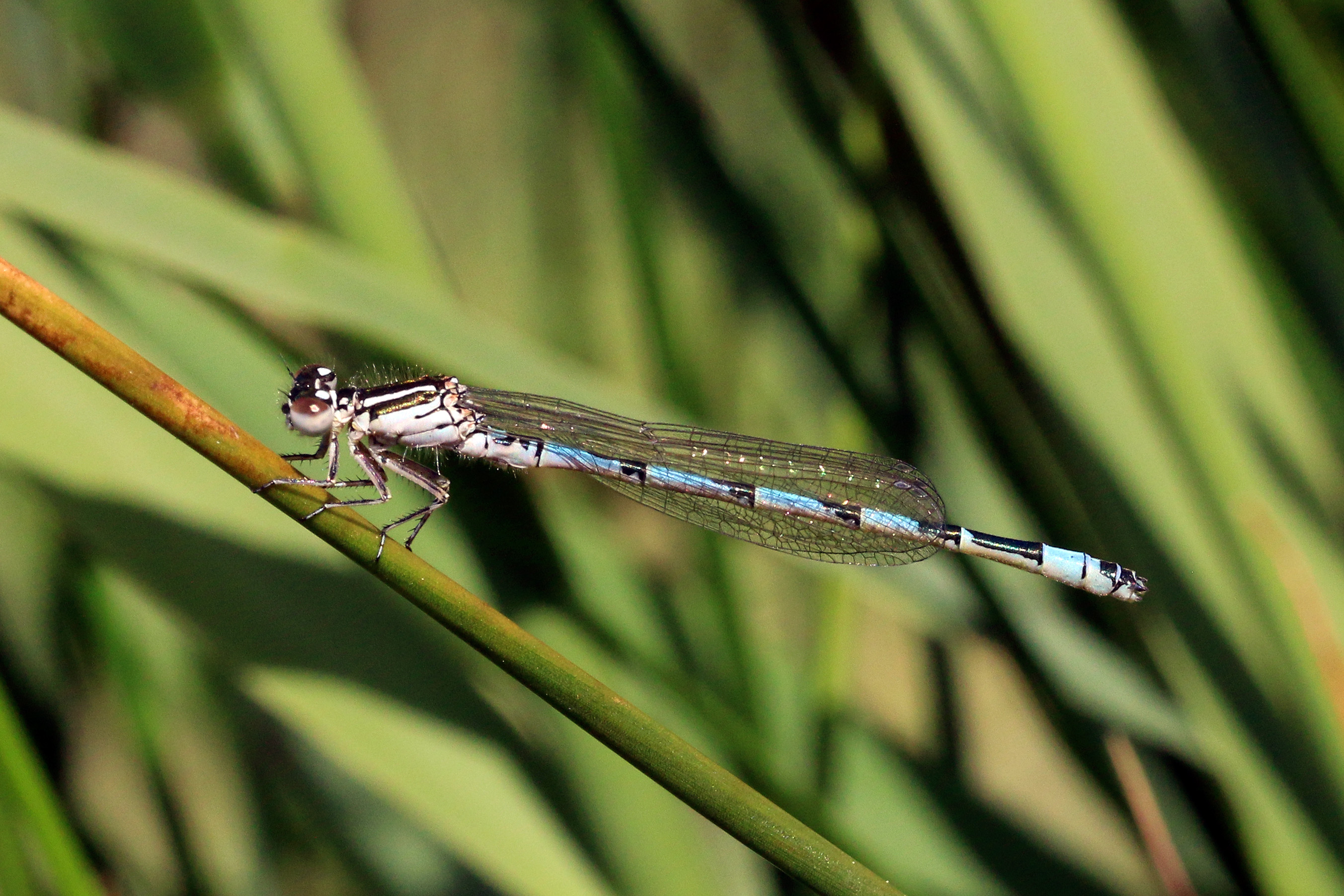
immature male Parsonage Moor, Oxfordshire

Coenagrion mercuriale, the southern damselfly, is a species of damselfly in the family Coenagrionidae. It is found in Algeria, Austria, Belgium, France, Germany, Italy, Liechtenstein, Luxembourg, Morocco, the Netherlands, Portugal, Romania, Slovakia, Slovenia, Spain, Switzerland, Tunisia, and the United Kingdom. Its natural habitats are rivers and freshwater springs. It is threatened by habitat loss.

The specific part of the scientific name, mercuriale, is because of the distinctive markings on the second segment of the abdomen that resembles the astrological symbol for the planet Mercury - ☿. This also gives the species an alternative common name of mercury bluet.

== Habitat ==
They require areas of open vegetation, mixed with slow flowing water in which to lay their eggs.

The larvae spend 2 years underwater before emerging as damselflies.

== Status in the United Kingdom ==
It is thought that 25% of the world population exists within the United Kingdom but it has declined by 30% since 1960 due to changes in grazing, land drainage and water abstraction.

Places where they are found include the New Forest, Hampshire, Oxfordshire and the Preseli Hills, Pembrokeshire, where work was being carried out in 2015 to improve habitat, work that was reported in 2020 as successful. In 2009, 500 adults were captured and released in the Venn Ottery nature reserve in Devon. This nature reserve is owned and managed by the Devon Wildlife Trust and grazing has been re-introduced there to help encourage this species which had not been recorded there since 1988.

The species is protected under Schedule 5 of the Wildlife and Countryside Act 1981.

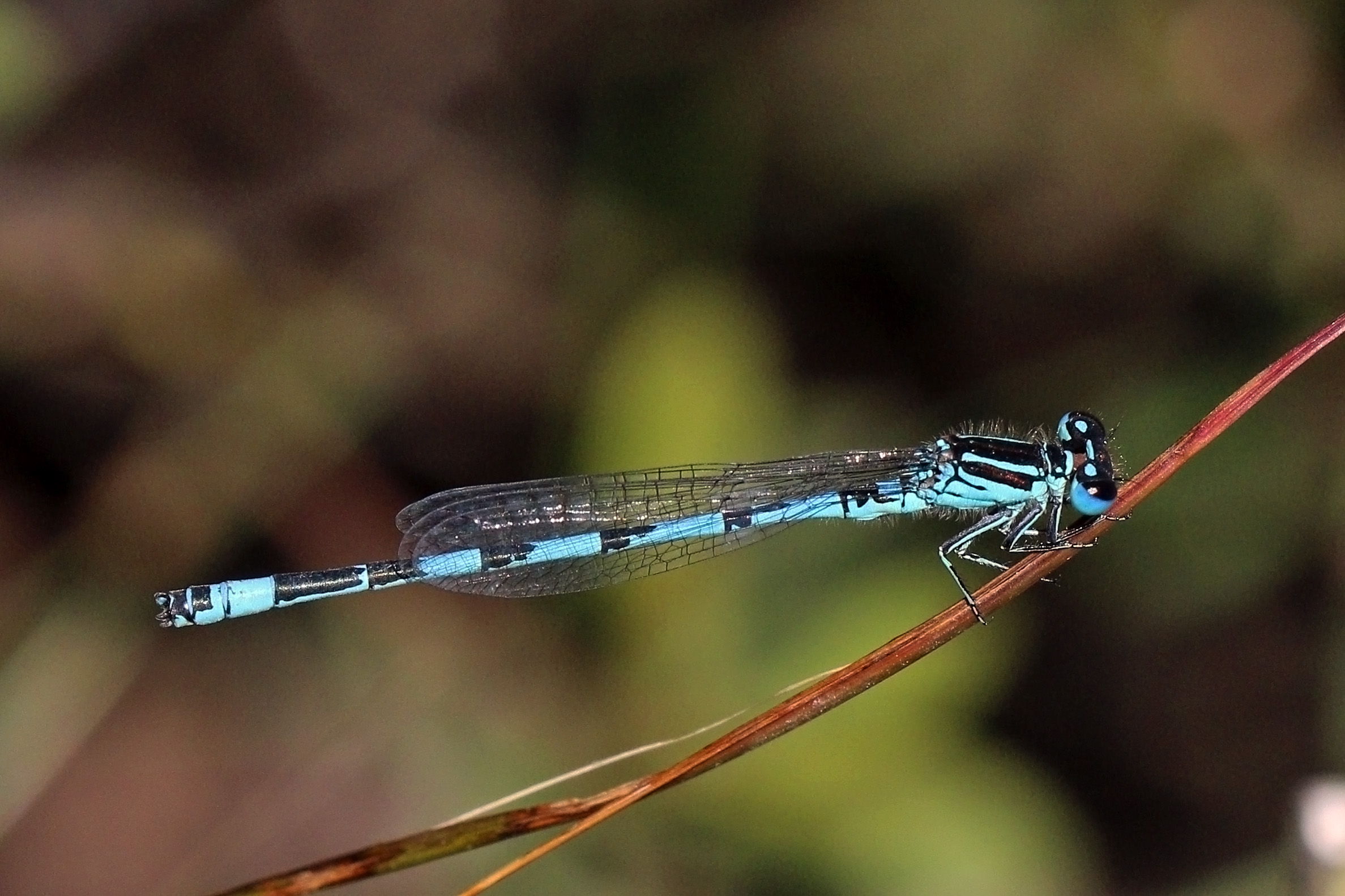
male, Crockford Stream, Hampshire
no spur on S9

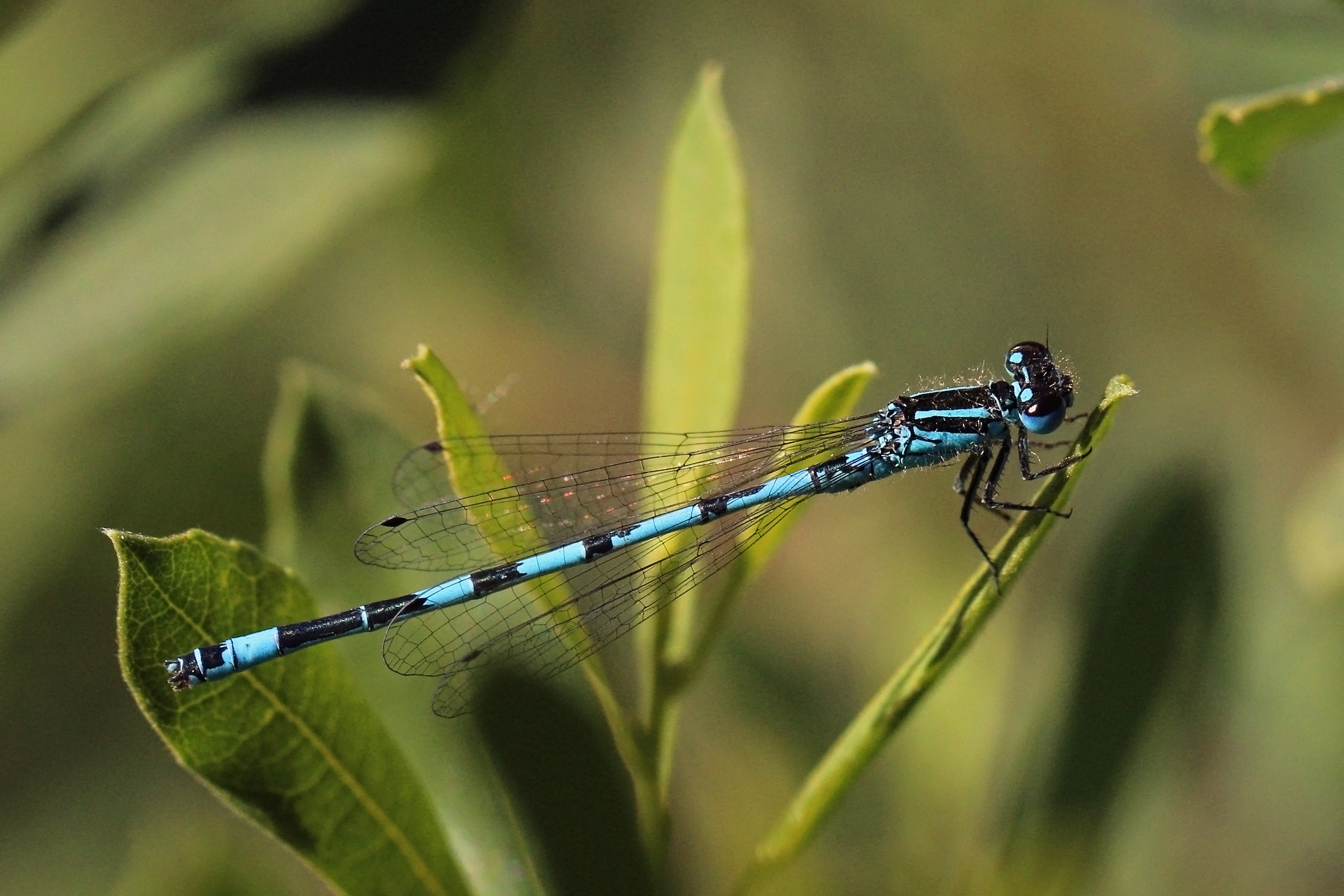
male, Crockford Stream, Hampshire
two spurs on S9
