= Natural Resources Wales =

Welsh Government sponsored body

- Cyfoeth Naturiol Cymru

Welsh Government Sponsored Body overview
- Formed: 1 April 2013
- Preceding agencies: Countryside Council for Wales; Environment Agency Wales; Forestry Commission Wales
- Jurisdiction: Wales
- Headquarters: Cardiff Cathays Park, Welsh Government Offices, Cathays Park, King Edward VII Avenue Cardiff; 51.4884°N 3.1826°W
- Employees: Over 2,000
- Annual budget: £141.4 million GBP
- Welsh Government Sponsored Body executives: Neil Sachdev, chair; Ceri Davies, chief executive
- Website: naturalresources.wales

Map
- Natural Resources Wales is responsible for environmental protection & regulation and the maintenance of natural resources throughout Wales.

Natural Resources Wales (Welsh: Cyfoeth Naturiol Cymru) is a Welsh Government sponsored body, which became operational from 1 April 2013, when it took over the management of the natural resources of Wales. It was formed from a merger of the Countryside Council for Wales, Environment Agency Wales, and the Forestry Commission Wales, and also assumed some other roles formerly performed by the Welsh Government.

== Roles and responsibilities ==
=== Purpose ===
NRW's purpose is to "pursue sustainable management of natural resources” and “apply the principles of sustainable management of natural resources” as stated in the Environment (Wales) Act 2016.

=== Remit ===
NRW receives a Remit Letter at the start of each financial year setting out what the Welsh Government wants it to achieve during that year.

A short film by NRW on ICT out in the field

An example of construction work by NRW: the Pontarddulais Flood Scheme

Its main responsibilities are:

- Adviser: principal adviser to Welsh Government, and adviser to industry and the wider public and voluntary sector, and communicator about issues relating to the environment and its natural resources.
- Regulator of the marine, forest and waste industries, and prosecuting those who breach the regulations that NRW is responsible for.
- Designator for Sites of Special Scientific Interest – areas of value for their wildlife or geology, Areas of Outstanding Natural Beauty (AONBs), and National Parks, as well as declaring National Nature Reserves, and describing Marine Character Areas.
- Responder to about 9,000 reported environmental incidents a year as a Category 1 emergency responder.
- Statutory consultee to about 7,000 development planning applications a year.
- Manager/Operator: managing seven per cent of Wales’ land area including woodlands, National Nature Reserves, water and flood defences, and operating five visitor centres, recreation facilities, hatcheries and a laboratory.
- Partner, Educator and Enabler: collaborator with the public, private and voluntary sectors, providing grant aid, and helping a wide range of people use the environment as a learning resource; acting as a catalyst for others’ work.
- Evidence gatherer: monitoring the environment, commissioning and undertaking research, developing knowledge, and being a public records body.
- Employer of almost 1,900 staff, as well as supporting other employment through contract work, and work experience.

=== Regulatory responsibilities ===
NRW is responsible for more than 40 different types of regulatory regime across a wide range of activities.

Some examples are:

- major industry (refineries, chemicals, cement, power stations, iron and steel, food and drink etc.).
- waste industry (storage, treatment, disposal).
- Sites of Special Scientific Interest - consents and assents.
- radioactive substances (nuclear and non-nuclear).
- European protected species licensing.
- Forestry licensing.
- marine licensing.
- water discharges (surface and groundwater).
- water resources (abstraction, impoundment, drought).
- packaging regulations and EU/UK trading schemes.
- commercial fisheries (eels, salmon, shellfish).
- Countryside and Rights of Way Act 2000 – access restrictions, open access land.

For most of these activities, NRW grants permits, undertakes compliance assessment and, where necessary, takes formal enforcement action.

== Statutory duties within the Environment (Wales) Act 2016 ==
=== State of Natural Resources Report ===
The Environment (Wales) Act 2016 requires NRW to prepare and publish a State of Natural Resources Report (SoNaRR).

SoNaRR assesses the current state of natural resources in Wales and whether they're being sustainably managed. It informs the Welsh Government's Natural Resources Policy to set priorities for action at the national level.

SoNaRR also looks at how pressures on Wales’ natural resources are resulting in risks and threats to long-term social, cultural, environmental and economic well-being as set out in the Well-being of Future Generations (Wales) Act 2015.

NRW will produce a new report every five years.

=== Area Statements ===
The Natural Resources Policy sets the context for Area Statements produced by NRW, which will deliver the national priorities at a local level. The Area Statements will specify priorities, risks and opportunities for sustainable management of natural resources and how NRW proposes to address them.

== Statutory duties within the Well-being of Future Generations (Wales) Act 2015 ==
=== Public Service Boards ===
The evidence in SoNaRR will also be used to inform the well-being assessments being prepared by Public Service Boards (PSB) as part of the requirements of the Well-being of Future Generations (Wales) Act 2015. NRW is a statutory member of each PSB. Statutory members are collectively responsible for fulfilling the PSB's statutory duties in relation to, for example, publishing a well-being assessment, a well-being plan and preparing an annual progress report.

=== Well-being Statement ===
Natural Resources Wales' first Well-being Statement, 'Managing today's natural resources for tomorrow's generations' meets its obligations under the Well-being of Future Generations (Wales) Act 2015. It sets out its Well-being Objectives and explains how meeting the objectives will contribute to the achievement of the well-being goals within the Act.

== Past and present officers ==
Short video of Clare Pillman

Chair:

- Peter Matthews (2013–2015)
- Diane McCrea (2015–July 2018)
- Sir David Henshaw (interim chair; July 2018 – 2024)
- Neil Sachdev (2025 - present)

Chief executive:

- Emyr Roberts (2013–2017)
- Clare Pillman (2018–2025)
- Ceri Davies (2025 - present)

== Merger debate ==
As a justification for the merger, the Welsh Government claimed that the new body would produce savings of £158 million over ten years. Whilst the three agencies were broadly supportive of the move, the board appointed by Environment minister John Griffiths did not include any representatives from the forestry sector, and Forestry Commission Wales chairman Jon Owen Jones - the former Welsh Labour MP for Cardiff Central - raised concerns that the forestry industry's voice would not be adequately heard in the new organisation.
