= John Barrett (conservationist) =

British conservationist (1913–1999)

- Born: John Henry Barrett; 21 July 1913; King's Lynn, Norfolk, England
- Died: 9 February 1999 (aged 85); England
- Occupation: Conservationist
- Known for: First warden at the Dale Fort Field Centre

John Henry Barrett MBE (21 July 1913 – 9 February 1999) was a pioneering conservationist, author and broadcaster, who was the first Warden at Dale Fort Field Centre in Pembrokeshire.

== Early life and education ==
Barrett was born in King's Lynn, Norfolk. He read Economics and Geography at Cambridge University.

== Second World War ==
In the 1930s, Barrett joined the RAF and served with Bomber Command, reaching the rank of Wing Commander. During the early part of World War II he was shot down and became a prisoner-of-war. The next years were spent in a succession of prisoner-of-war camps across Germany and Poland: Oflag VI-B (Dössel, near Warburg), Oflag XXI-B (Schubin), Stalag Luft III (Sagan) (where he was part of the support team for the "wooden horse" escape) and Stalag III-A (Luckenwalde). It was in Oflag VI-B that he met John Buxton, Peter Conder and George Waterston. In their company he developed his lifelong interest in birds, which he later turned to good use in Wales. These four recorded migration patterns and the minutiae of tree sparrow and chaffinch nesting behaviour.

== Post-war ==
Barrett subsequently lived in Pembrokeshire for 50 years. In 1947 he became the first Warden of Dale Fort Field Centre, established as a centre for the study of marine biology, but which also included the Skokholm Bird Observatory on the island of Skokholm. He was appointed Minister's Nominee to the fledgling Pembrokeshire Coast National Park, initiated a series of guided walks, fought for the establishment of a coastal path (he wrote the HMSO guide to the path), and served on the Park Committee for twenty-five years. He established the Pembrokeshire Countryside Unit in Broad Haven in 1968.

When leading walks along the coastal footpath he was accompanied by a dog called "dog".

== Books ==
- Barrett, J. H. & Yonge, C. M. (1958). Collins Pocket Guide to the Seashore. Collins London
- Barrett, J. H. & Nimmo, M. Flowers of the Coast Path (Pembrokeshire Coast National Park subject guide)
- Barrett, J. H. Seashore (1960) Collins.
- Barrett, J. H. Life on the Seashore (Countryside) (1974). Collins
- Barrett, J. H. Dale Peninsula (Pembrokeshire Coast National Park area guide) (1986)
- Barrett, J. H. A Plain Man's Guide to the Path round the Dale Peninsula (1966)
- Barrett, J. H. The Pembrokeshire Coast Path (1979)

== Sources ==
- Crothers, John (2000). "J. H. Barrett MBE, MA, MSc 1913–1999 [obituary]" (PDF). Field Studies. 9: 549–554.
- Wildlife. Issue no. 79, Spring 1999, Obituary
