= George Waterston =

British ornithologist (1911–1980)

George Waterston OBE FRSE FZS LLD (10 April 1911 – 30 September 1980) was a 20th-century Scottish stationer, ornithologist and conservationist. From 1949 to 1954 he owned the remote Scottish island, Fair Isle.

He founded the Inverleith Field Club in 1929 and co-founded what was the Midlothian Ornithologists' Club now known as the Scottish Ornithologists' Club. He was their President, Secretary, Treasurer and Honorary President at various times.

He was also one of the founders of the Scottish Arctic Club with its Waterston Arctic Library, now held by the Royal Scottish Geographical Society. He was Director of the Royal Society for the Protection of Birds in Scotland.

== Early life ==
Waterston was born in Edinburgh on 10 April 1911, the eldest of the seven children of Winifred (née Sandeman) and Robert Waterston. His father was director of George Waterson & Sons, a long-established family firm of Edinburgh printers and stationers. Whilst the main family lived at 10 Claremont Crescent in the northeast of the New Town, Robert and Winifred do not appear to have lived in the city.

Waterston was educated at Edinburgh Academy from 1918 to 1929. He then entered the family firm as a junior partner. This position afforded him both wealth and free time to pursue his main hobby of ornithology. On the death of his father and uncle George he became Director of the company.

The Midlothian Ornithologists' Club were keen to maintain ornithological work on the Isle of May in the Firth of Forth and a migratory study centre was established. Waterston was influenced by Ronald Lockley's work on Skokholm specifically the use of Heligoland trap which Waterston and others erected in 1934 assisted by Lockley and others.

He is probably best known for his interest in Fair Isle which he first visited in 1935 as a young man. He had great plans for the island, but these were interrupted by World War II. The Fair Isle Bird Observatory Trust was set up and founded in a POW camp. Waterston was appointed secretary and remained so until his death. He bought the island in 1947 and sold it for the same sum of money to the National Trust for Scotland in 1954.

== Second World War ==
As a lieutenant in the Royal Artillery, he was involved in the Battle of Crete, and was captured in 1941. Whilst a prisoner of war, he laid plans for a bird observatory and birdwatchers' hostel, but also for other aspects of island life such as a marketing scheme for the island's products, including Fair Isle knitwear.

In addition, he, along with John Buxton, Peter Conder, John Barrett and others, conducted ornithological work in Oflag VI-B in Dössel (now part of Warburg) and Oflag VII-B prisoner-of-war camps. Waterston was the only serving British officer to contribute a paper to a German scientific journal in wartime. Erwin Stresemann published his paper "A survey of the birds of Crete and bird migration in the Aegean" in the Journal für Ornithologie, based on ornithological observations made on Crete during the spring of 1941. He was repatriated in October 1943.

== Later life ==
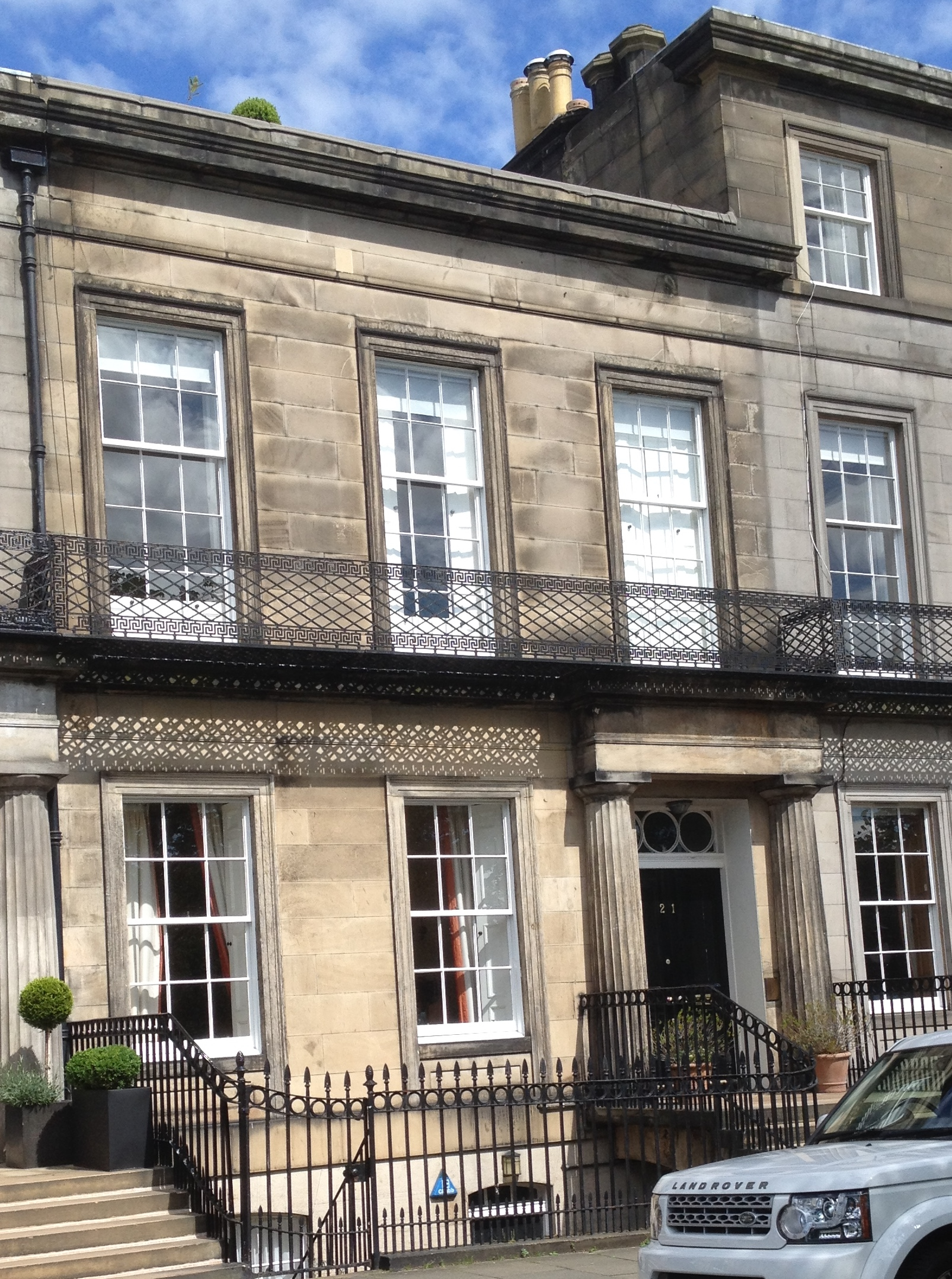
21 Regent Terrace, Edinburgh

Waterston joined James Fisher on the Agricultural Research Council's Rook Survey before rejoining the family business. In 1955, Waterston was appointed half-time salaried secretary to the Scottish Ornithologists' Club but he had a vision for an ornithological centre. This became reality in 1959 with the purchase of 21 Regents Terrace, Edinburgh. His energies had so broadened the field of bird protection in Scotland that a full-time RSPB Director was required – a post he held for 13 years.

Waterston was largely responsible for the protection of newly returned ospreys in the 1950s. He organised a large team of observers who mounted a round-the-clock guard and placed barbed wire around the base of the nesting site.

He purchased Fair Isle in Shetland and founded the Bird Observatory in 1948. He sold the island to the National Trust for Scotland in 1954. The latter continued to maintain the Observatory. Between 1962 and 1968 he and Roy Dennis made an unsuccessful attempt to re-establish white-tailed eagles on Fair Isle by releasing young birds collected from nests in Norway by the ornithologist Johan Fredrik Willgohs.

In the mid-sixties, his attention turned to Greenland and the Canadian Arctic where he joined several scientific expeditions. He died on 30 September 1980 and is buried in Humbie Parish Churchyard.

== Family ==
In 1947 he married Nancy Ritchie and together they had a son, William (d. 2016), who went on to become a solicitor. His marriage to Nancy was dissolved and in 1958 he married Irene Kinnear (d. 1984).

Waterston was survived by his son William. Both are survived by William's son Matthew Waterston. He was also cousin to Charles Dewar Waterston FRSE.

== Tributes ==
1948 - elected a Fellow of the Royal Society of Edinburgh.

1964 - appointed an OBE for services to ornithology and conservation.

1972 - awarded the RSPB Gold Medal.

1974 - University of Dundee awarded him an honorary LLD for his outstanding contribution.

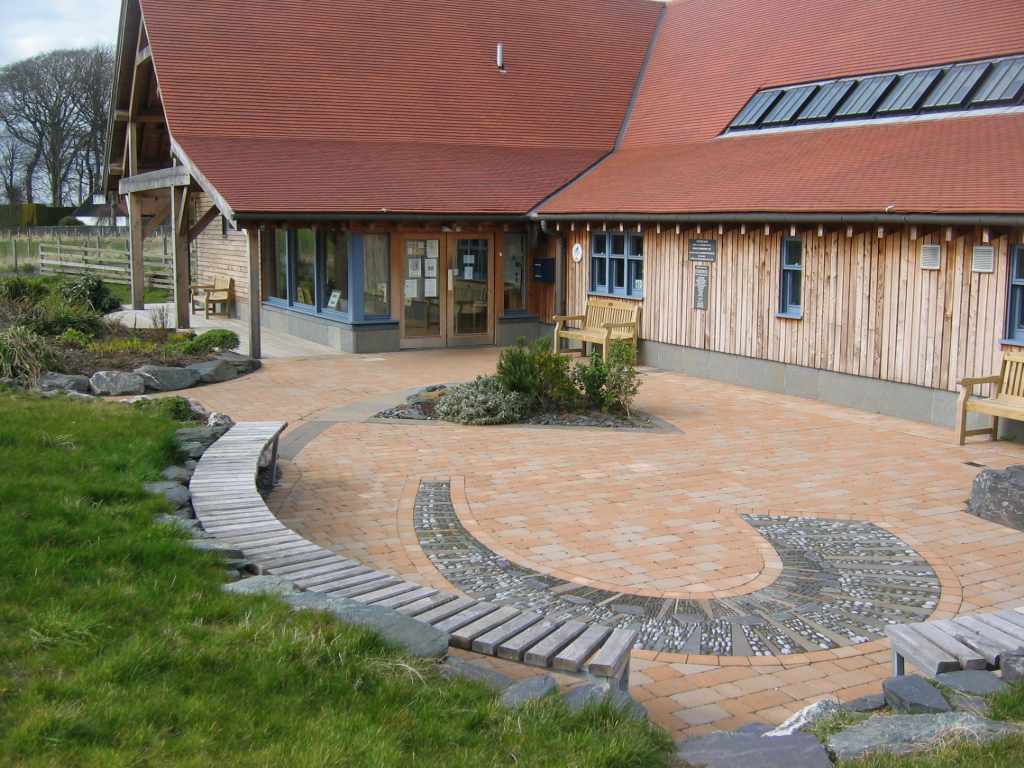
Waterston House, Aberlady - Headquarters of the Scottish Ornithologists' Club

George Waterston tried to encourage other conservationists, among them Donald Watson, the wildlife artist; the Art Gallery at Waterston House is named after him.

Two bird-related centres bear George Waterston's name:

- Waterston House, the headquarters of the Scottish Ornithologists' Club at Aberlady, East Lothian and its Local Nature Reserve
- George Waterston Memorial Centre and Museum on Fair Isle

A wildlife viewing hide at RSPB Scotland Loch Leven bears his name.

== Books ==
Brown, P and Waterston, G. (1962). The Return of the Osprey. Collins.

== See also ==
- Category:ornithologists
