= John Buxton (ornithologist) =

British ornithologist and poet

Edward John Mawby Buxton (16 December 1912 – 11 December 1989) was a scholar, university teacher, poet and an ornithologist who played a significant part in the development of ornithology in Britain in the years immediately after World War II.

== Early life ==
John Buxton was born in Bramhall, Cheshire, and educated at Yarlet Hall, Malvern College, and New College, Oxford. Before the war he visited Norway several times and gave lectures on English Literature at Oslo University. He also went on digging expeditions to Palestine and Ireland. He was Warden at Skokholm Bird Observatory in 1939 with his wife, Marjorie (Ronald Lockley's sister), conducting research and bird ringing.

== World War II ==
At the outbreak of war Buxton was reading for his D.Phil. at Oxford. He volunteered for the Navy, but when a special appeal came from the War Office for men with certain language qualifications he responded to that. After little over two months at an infantry OCTU he was posted, as an intelligence officer, to the 1st Independent Company (later to become the 1st Commandos) to Norway and was taken prisoner early in May 1940. In July he reached Prisoners of War Camp, Oflag VII C/H in Laufen Castle.

At this camp, the prisoners organised a 'University' and Buxton gave lectures in English and helped in the work of the library. His love of the countryside and of birds, apparent in his poetry, was a constant solace in camp life and bird-watching was, for him and several of his fellow prisoners, Peter Conder, John Barrett and George Waterston, one of the keenest of their few pleasures. They were brought together in Oflag VIB near Warburg and later in Oflag VIIB at Eichstatt., John was assisted by Erwin Stresemann, who sent rings to use in camp and some useful literature, including Niethammer's Handbuch der Deutschen Vogelkunde. His research during the incarceration years helped produce the New Naturalist monograph The Redstart (1950).

Westward was written in prison camp. It was of particular interest that prisoners should be able to carry on their literary work and for it eventually to reach England.

== Post-war ==
In 1946 Buxton became vice warden of Skomer Field Study Centre and as a member of West Wales Field Studies Council played a key part in establishing the original Bird Observatory committee. He gave the 1970 Warton Lecture on Poetry.

His life to retirement in 1979 was spent as Fellow of New College Oxford and reader in English literature in the university.

== Books ==
- Buxton, John. The Pilgrimage (1936)
- Buxton, John. Judas (1938)
- Buxton, John. Westward (1942) Jonathan Cape Ltd
- Buxton, John. Such Liberty (1944)
- Buxton, John. Atropos and other poems, (1946) MacMillan & Co Ltd
- Buxton, John. A Marriage Song for The Princess Elizabeth (1947) MacMillan & Co Ltd
- Lockley, R.M. & Buxton, John. (1950). Island of Skomer. Staples Press.
- Buxton, John (1950). The Redstart. New Naturalist
- Buxton, John (1954). Sir Philip Sidney and the English Renaissance.
- Buxton, John (1963). Elizabethan Taste. MacMillan & Co Ltd.
- Buxton, John (1967). A Tradition of Poetry. MacMillan & Co Ltd
- Buxton, John (1992). Walking in the Snow and Other Poems. The Perpetua Press, ed. Jon Stallworthy et al.
