= Peter Conder =

British ornithologist

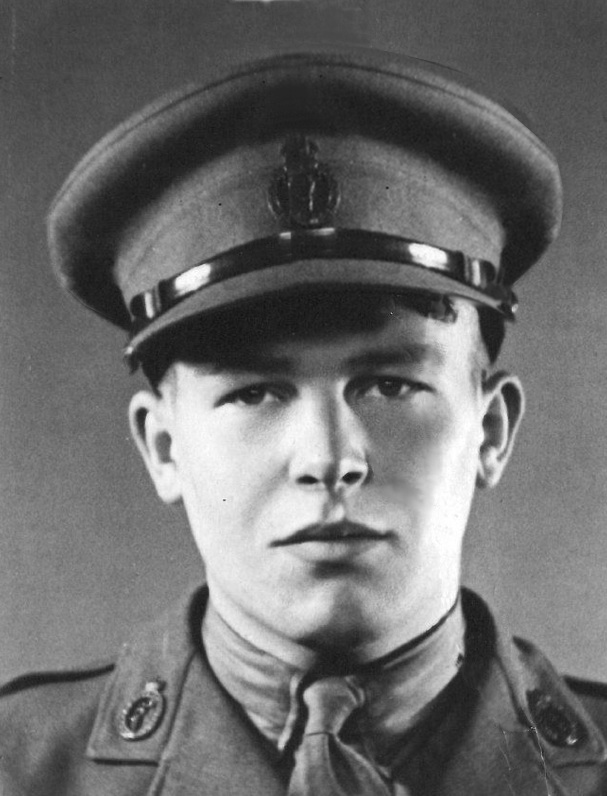
- Born: 20 March 1919; Streatham, London, UK
- Died: 8 October 1993 (aged 74); Cambridge, UK
- Education: Cranleigh School, Surrey
- Occupations: Ornithologist and Conservationist
- Years active: 1945–1986
- Title: Director of the Royal Society for the Protection of Birds
- Term: 1963–1976
- Awards: Order of the British Empire
- Military career
- Allegiance: United Kingdom
- Branch: British Army
- Service years: 1939 – 1945
- Rank: Lieutenant
- Unit: Royal Corps of Signals
- Conflicts: World War II; POW, 1940 – 1945

Peter Conder, OBE (20 March 1919 – 8 October 1993) was a British ornithologist and conservationist known predominantly for his contribution as Director of the Royal Society for the Protection of Birds.

== Early life ==
Peter Conder was born in Streatham, London, the son of John Reynolds Conder, a shipbroker, and his wife Edna Francis, née Benson. He was educated at Cranleigh School, Surrey. His interest in ornithology arose at Cranleigh School where he was a member of the school ornithological society; he recalled sneaking from the school dormitory for early morning birdwatching expeditions. After secondary school, Conder went to Lausanne, Switzerland, to learn French and spent six weeks in Newfoundland on a British Schools Exploring Society expedition. In the spring of 1938, he started work at the pioneering advertising agency S H Benson (founded by Conder's grandfather).

== Second World War ==
As war approached, Conder joined the Territorial Army, and was commissioned into the 2nd London Regiment, Royal Corps of Signals. When the British Expeditionary Force was sent to France (with World War I weapons) in 1939, he was deployed with the Royal Ulster Rifles, the Coldstream and the Grenadier Guards near Lille. On 12 June 1940 he was captured by the Germans at Saint-Valery-en-Caux, France, with the 51st (Highland) Infantry Division. They were marched through France, Belgium, Holland and Germany to Laufen on the German-Austrian border. Conder later wrote, "When I was captured I lost thirty thousand words. Two years' work".

=== Prisoner of War ===
From July 1940 to March 1941, Conder was incarcerated in Oflag VII-C, a prisoner-of-war-camp located in Laufen Castle on the banks of the Salzach river, Germany. In the spring of 1941, with the other younger officers he was moved to Stalag XXI-D in Poznań, Poland. In the move, he lost his suitcase containing writings of forty-five thousand words. A month later, Conder was moved to Stalag XX-A in the Toruń Fortress, Poland.

From Toruń, they were moved in June 1941 to Oflag V-B Biberach in southwest Germany. The camp was a modern German army barracks on the edge of the town set in a largely agricultural landscape with no trees or shrubs in the camp or close to it. Limited by the diversity of the local birds Conder spent the summer transcribing bird song.

Biberach was only 85 kilometres (53 mi) from the Swiss border and this short distance was the stimulus for several escape attempts. The most successful tunnel started below the seats (above the excreta) of a multi-holed lavatory which was situated on the edge of the camp. Eventually the digging team got out of the camp and four made it to the Schaffhausen Gap in Switzerland.

In the autumn of 1941, he was moved to Oflag VI-B in Dössel outside Warburg. The camp was on a plain which rose slightly to the south and was above the town of Warburg or the village of Dössel, so that except for a hill to the south they could see almost 360 degrees. Five hundred yards up the hill there was a barn which was important to the escapers. Officers with special interests had a chance to meet others with similar interests who had been in different camps and that went for birdwatchers particularly. Amongst these were John Barrett, John Buxton and George Waterston. They met once a month in John Buxton's room to record the birds they had seen and had regular talks and discussions.

In July he was watching the black redstart and for most of the winter, Conder watched the feeding and roosting habits of the local flock of rooks and jackdaws and observed the migration of a variety of species including crows moving northeast to Russia. The birdwatching prisoners stationed themselves on a slag heap in the upper part of the camp where they had an overall view of the sky and horizon and could watch and record the birds that passed.

He was arrested by the German guards in early 1942 as suspicions arose over his motives, as he was in a position to acquire intelligence for prisoners digging tunnels. Conder escaped twice; once through a tunnel with fourteen others, but he was recaptured after an hour. The second time the prisoners were being marched to a new camp responding to news of the approaching Allied forces, the line of prisoners was getting longer and longer and he and a friend dived into woods when they went round a bend. They hid in a barn for a few days and eventually saw American tanks approaching and were picked up. Conder arrived back in England on 5 April 1945.

4 September 1942 Oflag VII-B in Eichstätt, Bavaria. Of the camp he says, "It is in a valley with a river, forests on one side, and hills, rather like the South Downs, on the other. The buildings were barracks, and some new stone huts have been built, both of which are quite habitable. Along the edge of the camp is a double row of limes, and there are more trees in odd places around. It is of course a very good place for birds."

Conder started recording the behaviour of the European goldfinch at this camp.

July 1943 – April 1945 Oflag IX-A/Z in Rotenburg, Kassel district: "I am not doing any really intensive bird watching this year, only carrying out two rather smaller surveys; one a census of all birds seen on walks in their different habitats and the other a general survey of all the birds in the camp, so that I have a definite object inside and outside the camp."

== Post-war ==
From 1947 Conder was warden at Skokholm Bird Observatory with the West Wales Field Society. Conder set high standards of research and observation, not only for birds, but for the whole range of island wildlife. He studied the northern wheatear.

=== RSPB years ===
In 1954 he became assistant secretary of the Royal Society for the Protection of Birds (RSPB), responsible for acquisition and management of nature reserves, research, prosecutions, monitoring oil pollution and pesticides, and the protection of rare birds including of the ospreys at Loch Garten, Strathspey.

Conder became the Director of the RSPB in 1963, Conder appointed specialist staff to deal with nature reserves, research, education, publications, film and financial administration. The membership rose from 20,000 to 200,000. Conservation achievements included the RSPB's contribution to the successful campaign to stop the use of organochlorine pesticides, ospreys had become established once more as a breeding species in Britain, the society's list of nature reserves was added to each year and the realisation of the significance of research to successful nature conservation, an applied science, was beginning to be taken seriously by government. He served on the Secretary of State for Home Affairs Advisory Committee on Protection of Birds Act. Travelling extensively, he represented the RSPB overseas at international conferences advising and assisting.

Conder retired in 1976.

=== Post-RSPB ===
Conder spent the next decade as a wildlife consultant serving on training programmes, conservation panels and advisory boards in Britain and abroad. At intervals, he led wildlife tours for British and American companies in South America, Europe, the Near East and the Indian sub-continent. He also co-edited British Birds.

Positions

- Department of the Environment, Scientific Authority for Animals committee.
- UNESCO, Convention for Protection of World Cultural and Natural History. Advice on selection of natural sites. Pakistan.
- Advisory Committee for England, Nature Conservancy Council
- Conservation Panel of the National Trust
- Founder Member of the Rare Breeding Birds Panel
- Management Consultant for WWF and IUCN in Pakistan (Sind Province) and Jordan. (In Azraq Oasis of the Syrian Desert for wetland management.)
- Consultant, Earthwatch Europe. Project S'Albufera.
- Consultant, Wetland Management, Cummune de Comacchio, Italy.
- Dyfed Wildlife Trust, Islands Management Committee
- Cambridge Bird Club, Chairman 1975–1979, Vice-President 1981–1986, President 1987 until his death.

From 1978 he returned to his study of wheatears.

His bird records are archived in the Edward Grey Institute of Ornithology, Oxford.

== Awards ==
- 1976 – appointed OBE for services to conservation.
- 1977 – Honorary MA, Open University conservationist, protector of wildlife, scholar.
- 1977 - RSPB Gold Medal for services to bird protection.

== Publications ==
- British Garden Birds 1966, ISBN 0-17-147025-7
- Birds of Woods and Hedges 1969, ISBN 0-17-147031-1
- RSPB Guide to Birdwatching 1978, ASIN: B000RZC5Z6
- RSPB Guide to Watching British Birds (with David Saunders) 1984, ISBN 0-600-30583-X
- The Wheatear 1990; ISBN 0-7470-0406-4
- The Spur Book of Birdwatching. ISBN 0-7232-3030-7
- Skokholm Summers 2025. Amazon
- Management Plan for La Albufera de Mallorca. Report to ICONA, manuscript
