= West Blockhouse =

West Blockhouse may refer to a:

- West Blockhouse, a Palmerston Fort in Milford Haven
- West Blockhouse, a 16th-century fortification in Angle, Pembrokeshire
