= Peter Moss =

British colonial administrator and conservationist

Peter de Vere Moss FRGS
- Born: 2 August 1938; Shillong, Assam, British India
- Died: 22 April 2017 (aged 78)
- Education: Malvern College; University of Guelph (BSc)
- Occupations: Colonial administrator, park ranger, conservationist
- Known for: Management plan for Kafue National Park; Co-founding the Welsh Wildlife Centre; Pioneer of eco-tourism

Peter de Vere Moss FRGS (2 August 1938 – 22 April 2017) was a British colonial administrator who later became a park ranger, conservationist, and pioneer of eco-tourism.

== Early life and family ==
Peter de Vere Moss was born in Shillong, Assam, on 2 August 1938, the son of Lt. Co. Harry de Vere Moss of the Punjab Frontier Regiment. His family left India when he was seven at the time of the break-up of the country. He received his early education at Glen Gorse preparatory school followed by Malvern College.

Moss's first marriage, to Judy, was dissolved. His second marriage was to Jill.

== Career ==
At the age of 19, Moss joined the provincial administration of the Northern Rhodesia Government as a trainee. In 1961 he attended a one-year Colonial Service course at Cambridge. He returned to Northern Rhodesia and became a district officer. Internal political strife caused him to become disillusioned with public administration, however, and in 1965 he took a post with the Department of Game and Tsetse Control in Chilanga, near Lusaka.

He took a break to complete his education, returning to London to take A levels which he followed with a degree with first class honours in Fish and Wildlife Biology at Guelph University in Canada. On his return to Zambia he became a park ranger at the Kafue National Park, an area about the size of Wales in western Zambia. He produced the first park management plan for the area.

In 1978, back in Britain, he opened the Cardigan Wildlife Park, now known as the Welsh Wildlife Centre, with Ian Manning and David Lloyd. It included rare breeds of sheep cattle and horses as well as species not native to Wales such as bison, wildcats and wolves.

In later life he set up Eco-safari, which became the Ultimate Travel Company, which specialised in exotic holidays with conservation benefits for the destinations, and continued to be consulted by governments around the world for his advice. He was an honorary associate of the Durrell Institute of Conservation and Ecology, a scientific fellow of the Zoological Society of London and a fellow of the Royal Geographical Society.

== Death and legacy ==
Moss died on 22 April 2017. He was survived by his second wife and two children, as well as a child of his first marriage.

== Selected publications ==
- A Visitor's Guide to Kafue National Park, Zambia. 2013.

=== Technical reports ===
- General Management Plan for Kafue National Park, Zambia, 1976. (Revised edition 2010)
- Integrated Resources Management Plan for the Sundarbans Reserved Forest, Bangladesh, 1997.
- Phulchoki-Chandragiri Conservation Area Project, Nepal, 2000.
- National Policy on Environment, NPE, Zambia 2005.
