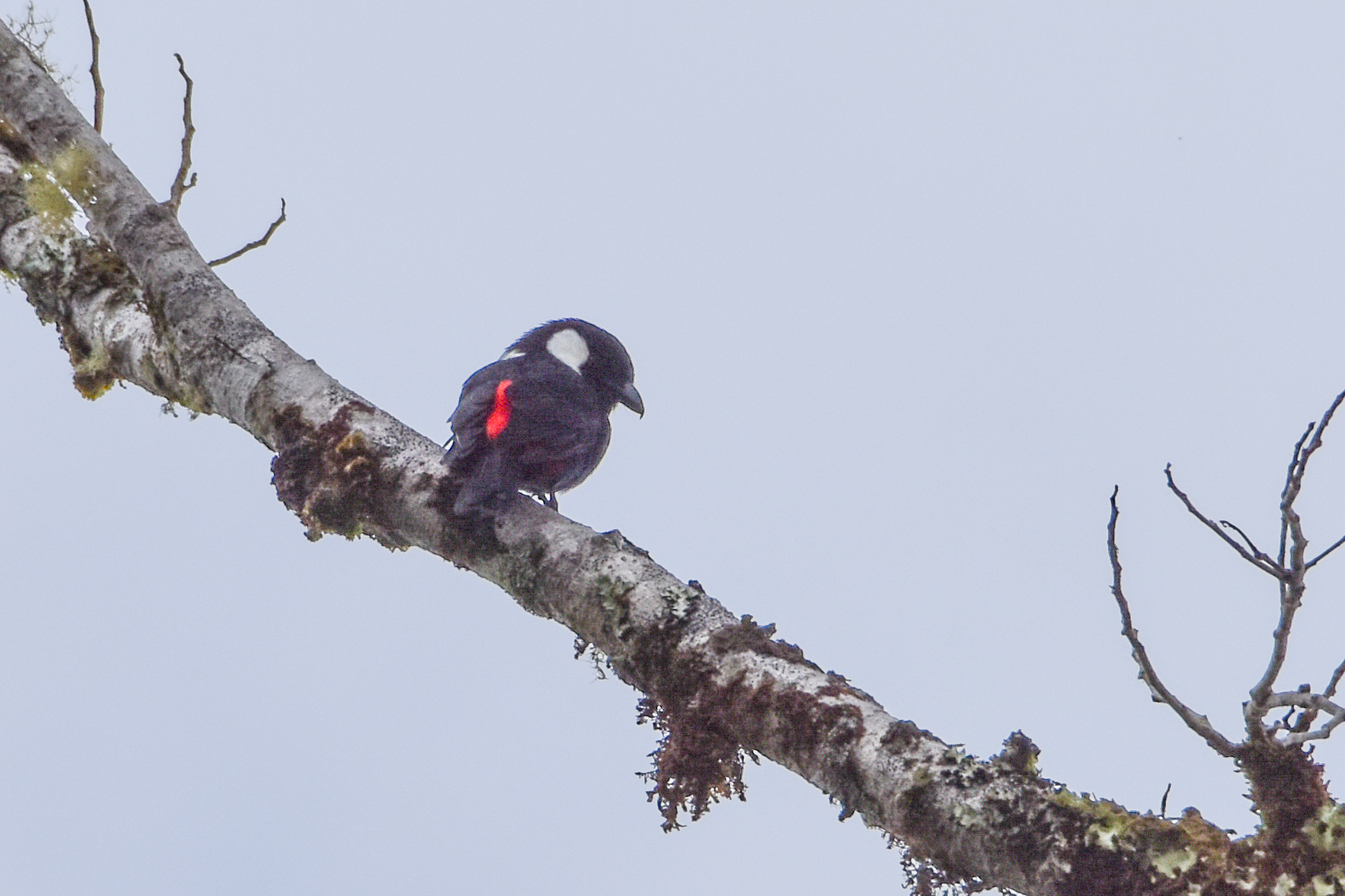

Conservation status
- Least Concern (IUCN 3.1)

Scientific classification
- Kingdom: Animalia
- Phylum: Chordata
- Class: Aves
- Order: Passeriformes
- Family: Artamidae
- Subfamily: Cracticinae
- Genus: Peltops
- Species: P. montanus

Binomial name
- Peltops montanus Stresemann, 1921

= Mountain peltops =

Species of bird

The mountain peltops (Peltops montanus) is a species of bird in the family Cracticidae. It is found in Indonesia and Papua New Guinea. Its natural habitats are subtropical or tropical moist lowland forests and subtropical or tropical moist montane forests.
