= East Blockhouse =

East Blockhouse may refer to:

- East Blockhouse, a Palmerston Fort in Milford Haven
- East Blockhouse, a 16th-century fortification in Angle, Pembrokeshire
