= George Waterston Memorial Centre and Museum =

The George Waterston Memorial Centre and Museum is a local museum in Fair Isle, Scotland.

George Waterston OBE (1911–1980), the former Scottish Director of the Royal Society for the Protection of Birds, was a much-loved figure who had a massive and positive influence on Fair Isle. He bought the island after World War II and co-founded the Bird Observatory in 1948, giving the isle's economy a much-needed boost. In 1955, the National Trust for Scotland succeeded him as landlord and helped islanders to stem emigration and revitalise the community.

Waterston's memorial is a museum in the former Fair Isle School containing displays of Fair Isle's history from prehistoric times to the present.

The collection consists of archaeology, natural sciences, decorative and applied art, fine art, costume, textiles, coins and medals. Next to that it has presentations on social history, music, personalities, world cultures, weapons and war, and land transport and maritime. The museum also maintains an archive.

== Other sites ==
The Scottish Ornithologists' Club decided to name their new headquarters after George Waterston. The building is in Aberlady, East Lothian, on the edge of Aberlady Bay and Kilspindie Golf Club.

Waterston House has one of the largest libraries on ornithology topics in the UK.

== See also ==
- List of music museums
