= Erwin Stresemann =

German ornithologist and naturalist (1889–1972)

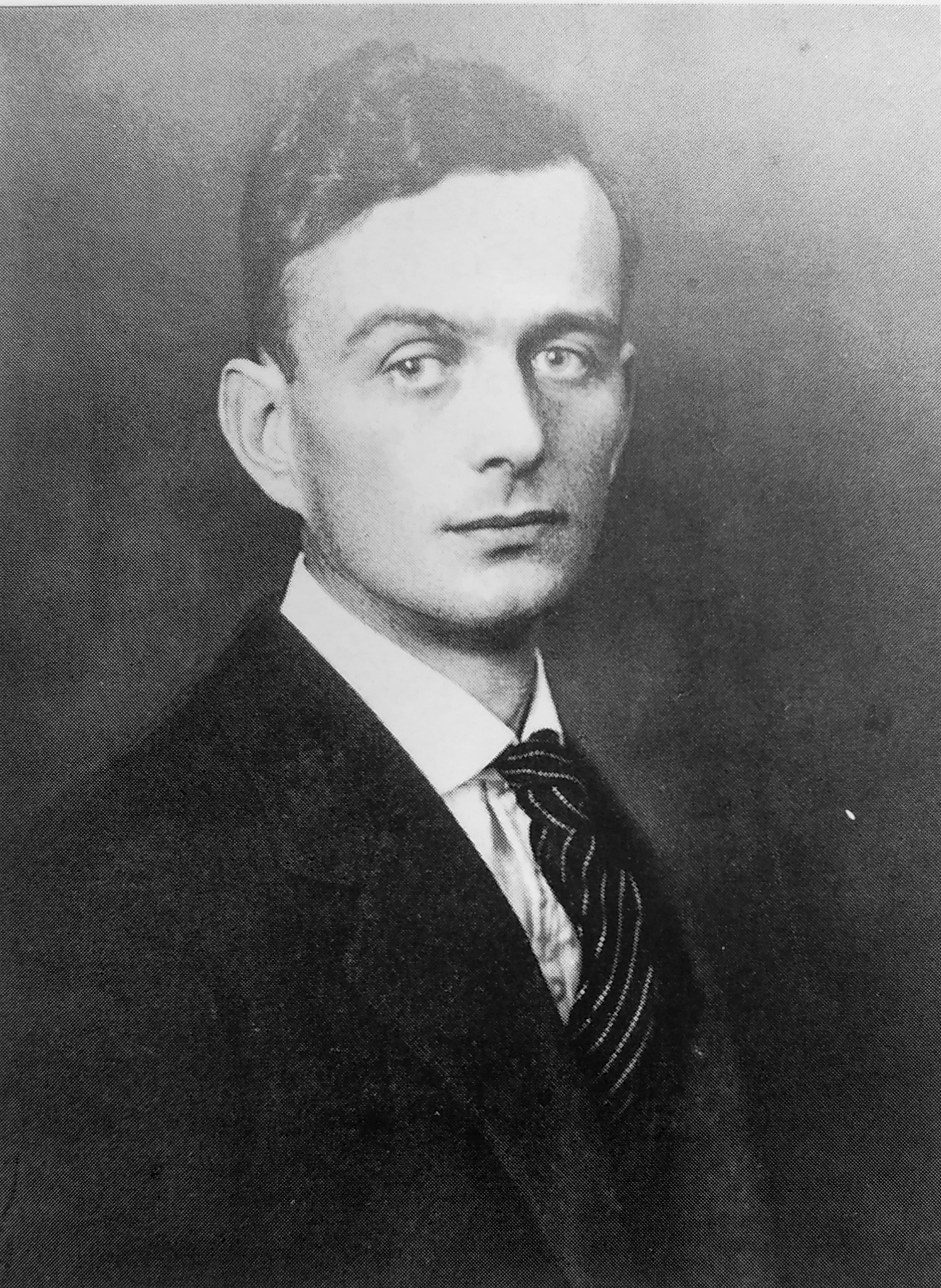
- Stresemann in 1919
- Born: 22 November 1889; Dresden, German Empire
- Died: 20 November 1972 (aged 82); Berlin
- Scientific career
- Fields: Naturalist; ornithologist
- Author abbrev. (zoology): Stresemann

Erwin Friedrich Theodor Stresemann (22 November 1889, in Dresden – 20 November 1972, in East Berlin) was a German naturalist and ornithologist. Stresemann was an ornithologist of extensive breadth who compiled one of the first and most comprehensive accounts of avian biology of its time as part of the Handbuch der Zoologie (Handbook of Zoology). In the process of his studies on birds, he also produced one of the most extensive historical accounts on the development of the science of ornithology. He influenced numerous ornithologists around him and oversaw the development of ornithology in Germany as editor of the Journal für Ornithologie. He also took an interest in poetry, philosophy and linguistics. He published a monograph on the Paulohi language based on studies made during his ornithological expedition to the Indonesian island.

== Early life ==
Stresemann was born in Dresden to Richard, an apothecary and Marie. His grandfather Theodor owned the Zum Roten Adler pharmacy in Berlin-Kölln while his father and a brother Gustav owned the Mohrenapotheke in Dresden from 1876. The family was affluent, providing a stimulating environment and he took an interest in beetles and maintained a vivarium. When he joined the Vitzthum Gymnasium, the teacher of mathematics and biology, Dr. Otto Koepert, gave Erwin the job of organizing the school's collection of American and African birds. At a comparatively young age he was able to travel to Heligoland, Bornholm and Moscow. After high school he went to study zoology at the University of Jena in 1908, and then transferred to the Ludwig-Maximilians-Universität München to study under Richard von Hertwig, and still later at the Freiberg University of Mining and Technology. He made contact with Ernst Haeckel and studied marine biology at Bergen. He took a break from 1910 to 1912 to join as an ornithologist the "Second Freiburg Expedition" to the Moluccas (1910–12). The expedition was led by Karl Deninger, a geologist who had visited the islands in 1906–1907. They were joined by ethnologist Odo Deodatus Tauern. The cost had to be borne by the participants, and Stresemann prepared himself on fauna, geology and ethnology of the Moluccas. He went to Tring and consulted with Ernst Hartert and then climbed hills and trained to stand the heat by climbing Mount Vesuvius. The three had a custom built boat but it did not arrive in the Mollucas when they reached Singapore by a Lloyd Steamer in September 1910. They interacted with the Sekai through the Italian explorer G. Emilio Cerruti who had lived there for two decades (as the king of the tribe!). Their boat "Friborg" arrived in November but the boat did not do well and they were stranded in Bali. Repair of the boat in Java would take three weeks with Deninger handling it while Stresemann and Tauern crossed Bali examining the fauna (adding 53 new species of birds from Bali). The Friborg sank while Deninger was returning to Bali and subsequently all journey were made on a Dutch steamer. They travelled into central Seram and during this time Stresemann took a great deal of interest in the native Alfurians. He spent six months studying the language and exploring Buru. They finally returned to Europe on 1 April 1912 with 1,200 bird skins. Stresemann then studied the bird collections at the Rothschild Museum in Tring where Ernst Hartert worked. His study was supported by Rothschild, and several new species were named in his honour. Stresemann also published his studies on the now near-extinct Paulohi language and wrote a monograph on the topic and a paper on language relations. He also published on the religious customs on Seran. Stresemann also took an interest in poetry, the writings of Goethe, Descartes and Bismarck. Stresemann's studies were interrupted by the First World War and he was conscripted, serving initially in an artillery unit on the Western Front. From an anchored balloon used to study the accuracy of artillery, he made studies using rangefinders on the heights of flight of swifts. He was transferred to Italy and was wounded in November 1917. He returned to Munich and resumed his studies and graduated with majors in zoology and minors in botany and anthropology. He briefly studied under Richard von Hertwig in Munich and examined the avifauna of Macedonia. He graduated summa cum laude in March 1920.

== Aves ==
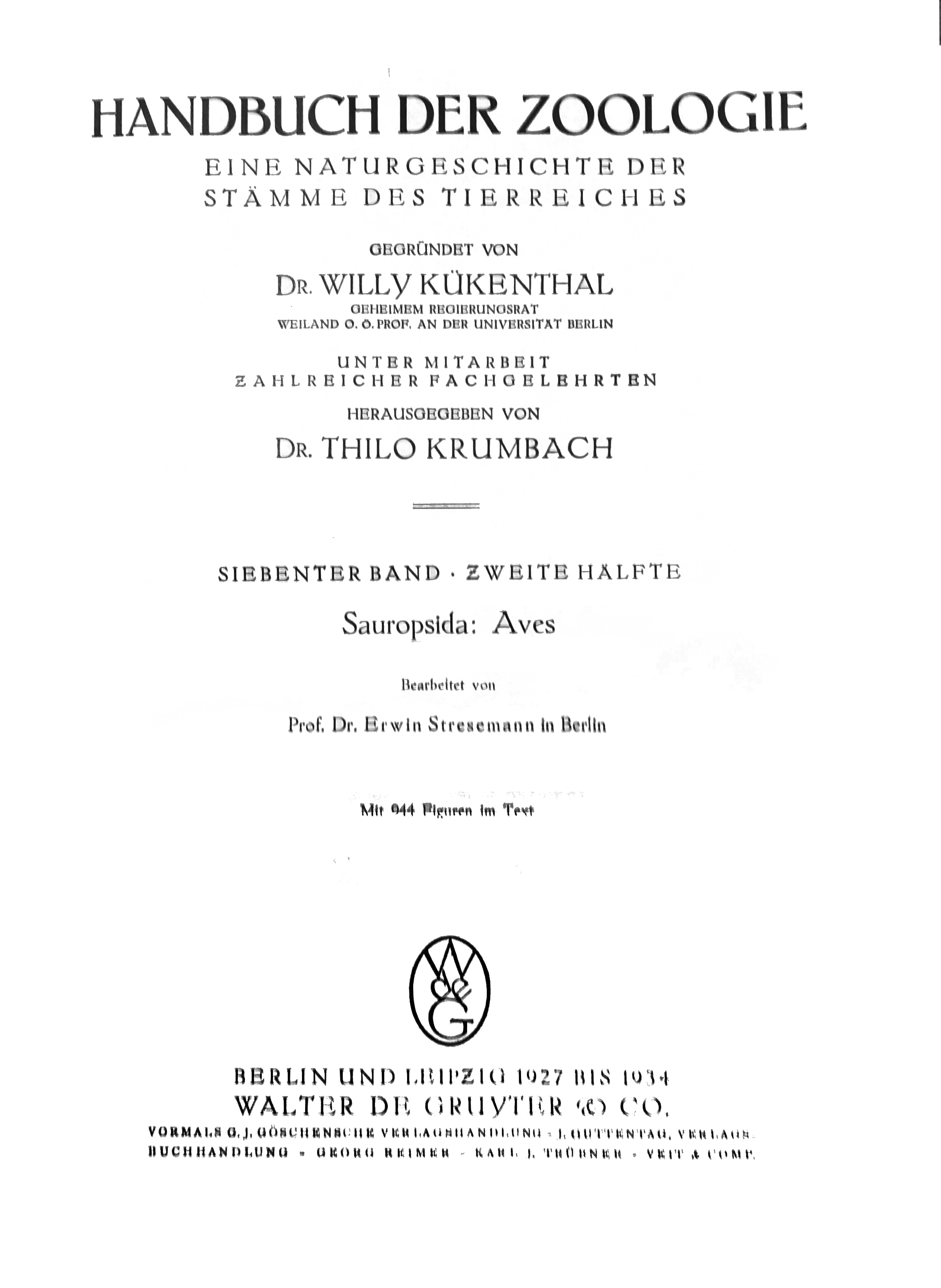
Title page of the 1934 volume

One of Stresemann's early achievements was his authorship of the parts on Aves in the Handbuch der Zoologie. In 1914, the editor of the series, Willy Kükenthal (1861–1922), offered the task to him after others like Anton Reichenow (1847–1941), Valentin Haecker (1864–1927) and Oskar Heinroth (1871–1945) refused to take it up as they were preoccupied. His position as a 24-year old zoology student in comparison to the others was remarkable and Jurgen Haffer notes that this work acted as a springboard for his future career. Stresemann had eminent peers and mentors in Ernst Hartert, Carl Zimmer, Otto Kleinschmidt and Carl Eduard Hellmayr. The Aves work continued to be updated until 1934 and Stresemann produced one of the most comprehensive treatises on birds. It covered anatomy, morphology, behaviour, physiology, and evolution in ways that no other work had done before. It was not until the 1960s that anything comparable was produced in the English language in the multi-author work edited by A.J. Marshall (1960–1961) and later in the multi-volume series on Avian Biology edited by Farner and King.

== Berlin ==
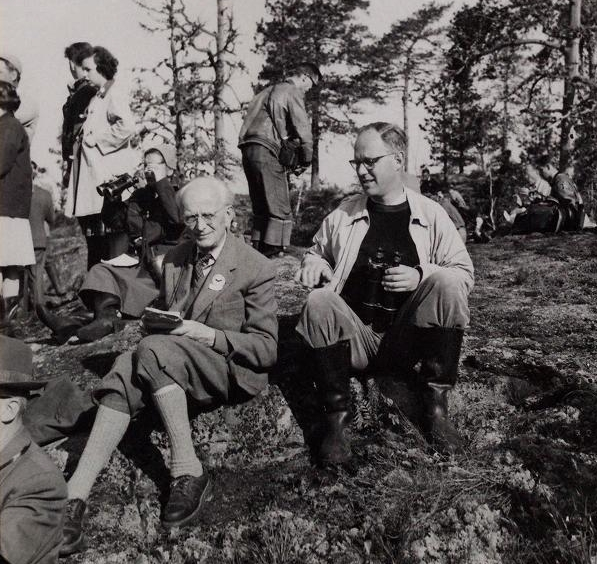
Stresemann (left) at Vesterkulla, June 8, 1958 during the XII Ornithological Congress in Finland

In 1920 he succeeded Anton Reichenow (in his seventies) as curator of ornithology at the Zoological Museum in Berlin, a position he stayed in until his retirement in 1961. The surprise appointment was through Kükenthal's influence. He attended meetings of the Deutsche Ornithologen-Gesellschaft where he was known for his argumentation. He proved himself as a person of wide reading and immense knowledge. His first student was Bernard Rensch. This was followed by Theodor Elsässer who studied iridescent feathers for his doctorate. This was followed by Ernst Mayr on zoogeography, Ernst Schüz on the evolution of powder down, Wilhelm Meise on systematics, Emil Kattinger and Fritz Frank. They pursued diverse topics in ornithology. He was made professor in 1930 and from 1946 to 1961 he was tenured professor at the Humboldt University of Berlin. In November 1935, Stresemann was invited to Yale University by Leonard Cutler Sanford and was offered a position there. Stresemann however felt that he belonged to Berlin. He wrote that he could have worked there but could not live there. During the war years from 1941, he ensured that the 40,000 bird skins and rare books were safely stored in an underground locker. They were safely restored after the war. He also kept up communication with European ornithologists who became German prisoners of war such as David Bannerman. He ensured that they obtained the latest research papers as well. During his career, he worked continuously on several areas of ornithology and maintained a broad interest that allowed him to produce a major treatise on the history and development of the field of ornithology. Towards the 1960s he recognized his own weaknesses in not understanding the applications of statistics in ornithology or the biochemical approaches to systematics. At this point, he shifted focus, along with his second wife Vesta, to the study of the patterns of moults in birds. The Frank M. Chapman Memorial Fund allowed him to examine bird collections around the world to study moult. In his 1966 work dedicated to Oskar Heinroth, he examined moulting patterns and sought to see if there were phylogenetic patterns in them and concluded that they did not show any clear relationship. He found several other biological traits that seemed to influence moult, at least of the flight feathers. He was decorated with GDR Patriotic Order of Merit. In the 1960s and 70s he and his wife were provided special permissions to pass through the Berlin wall at any time to visit the Zoological Museum.

When the Natural History Museum in London established their ornithology collections at Tring in July 1972, Stresemann and his wife were special invitees at the inauguration.

== Influences ==
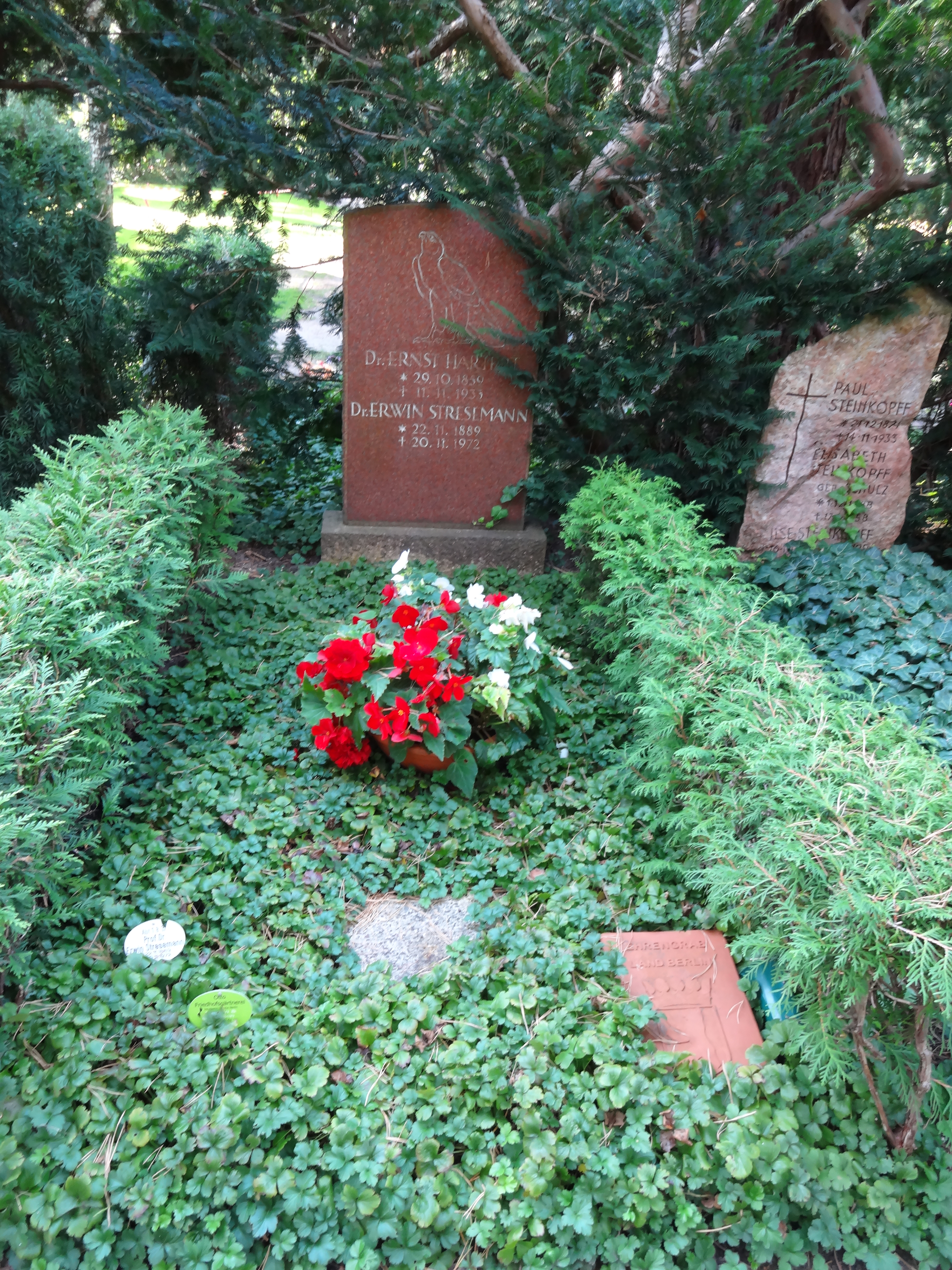
Stresemann's ashes were interred at the grave of his mentor Ernst Hartert at Waldfriedhof Dahlem 52.4560°N 13.2654°E

Stresemann was one of the outstanding ornithologists of the 20th century but is often not recognized outside Germany because most of his works were written in German and ignored due to the wartime rivalries. At the age of 40, Stresemann was elected President of the 8th International Congress. He encouraged a number of young German scientists, including his most famous student Ernst Mayr and Bernhard Rensch. Stresemann had proposed that geographic isolation was key to the speciation of birds, an idea which was developed further by Mayr. Stresemann's influence in ornithology was through his work Aves, the editorship of the Journal für Ornithologie, the leadership of the DO-G and through mentoring students. He established what has been called the "New Avian Biology." Mayr however noted that despite being progressive, Stresemann did not fully grasp or understand the synthesis of evolution and genetics.

Stresemann was the long-standing editor of the Journal für Ornithologie (1922 onwards). As editor, he moved away from the traditional emphasis on faunistics and collections to a preference for articles dealing with the anatomy, physiology, life-history studies and the behaviour of birds. His major publication was the volume Aves (1927–1934) in the Handbuch der Zoologie (Handbook of Zoology). He also wrote Entwicklung der Ornithologie von Aristoteles bis zur Gegenwart (1951), a review of the development of ornithology from Aristotle to modern times, translated into English in 1975 as "Ornithology from Aristotle to the Present".

== Personal life ==
Stresemann married Elisabeth Deninger, sister of his expedition-mate Karl Deninger, in 1916. She was the daughter of chemist Albert Deninger, known for his work on fluoride toothpastes. They divorced in 1939. Stresemann married Vesta née Grote (who was widowed after her husband Friedrich Hauchecorne (1894 – 1938), director of the Halle zoo, was killed in a hunting accident) during the war years in 1941 and they worked on many ornithological papers, especially on moult, and she survived him to live to 103 years. Stresemann was known for his impeccable sense of dressing, his affable personality and excellent dancing in his youth. He was an excellent speaker, carefully adding wit and humour, and proud of the German language despite knowing excellent English. At the Ornithological Congress at Oxford in 1934 he intentionally gave a one-hour presidential speech in German. His German pride was always tempered by his meticulousness and when surprise was expressed after turkey frescoes were found in the Schleswig Cathedral during restoration Stresemann carefully examined the evidence to see if indeed the pictures were made in the 13th century. It however turned out that the frescoes were added by Hanover artist August Olbers who confessed adding them when restoring damage in 1890.

Stresemann died after suffering from poor health since his 80th birthday. In February 1972 he had a cataract removal for his eyes and was delighted with his new found vision. He however suffered that autumn with a heart-trouble and he had wished to be buried alongside his mentor Ernst Hartert. He was cremated and according to his wishes the ashes were interred into the grave of Ernst Hartert in the Waldfriedhof (forest cemetery) at Dahlem.

== Legacy ==
Stresemann is commemorated in the scientific names of numerous species of animals including a species of gecko, Cyrtodactylus stresemanni, at least two butterflies (Walter Rothschild named some butterflies from the Molucca expedition after Stresemann. One of them, Papilio stresemanni, was mistaken by the German press who thought it linked Gustav Stresemann, then foreign minister, with the Jewish banking magnate), a grasshopper Oxya stresemanni and several birds (Hylexetastes stresemanni described by Emilie Snethlage in 1925, Zaratornis stresemanni, and Zavattariornis stresemanni are full species but a much larger number of birds honour him in their subspecific name), a bat Rousettus stresemanni, and a mollusc Isidora stresemanni. Some of these species were described from Stresemann's Moluccas expedition.

== Nazi affiliation ==
Stresemann's association with and affinity for Nazi ideology is ambiguous. There is no evidence that he was a member of the NSDAP; however, when Stresemann visited the bird collection at the Academy of Natural Sciences of Philadelphia in January 1936, he was questioned by a newspaper reporter about Hitler’s imperialist agenda and its vision of Aryan supremacy. Stresemann reportedly stated that “There is a pure Aryan race politically—if not anthropologically ... The Hitler Government preaches the idea of the emergence of a race of tall, fair, blue-eyed men and women which we shall believe to be superior, racially, economically and artistically ... I do not believe Germany can be great if the German strain is mixed with the blood of alien races.”

Stresemann also stated, in response to a question about the anti-Jewish Nuremberg Laws in Germany that, "the Government is trying to work out a plan—a solution. I believe in time it will be found”, presumably referring to the Final Solution. Stresemann however supported British prisoners of war including John Buxton, Peter Conder, and George Waterston in Nazi Germany who were interested in birds, providing them books and supporting their bird studies.

== Cited references ==
- Haffer, Jürgen; Rutschke, Erich; Wunderlich, Klaus (2000). "Erwin Stresemann (1889–1972). Leben und Werk eines Pioniers der wissenschaftlichen Ornithologie". Acta Historica Leopoldina (34): 1–465. ISBN 3-8304-5091-5.
