= Ronald Lockley =

Welsh ornithologist and naturalist

- Lockley c. 1940
- Born: 8 November 1903; Cardiff, Wales
- Died: 12 April 2000 (aged 96)
- Occupations: Ornithologist, naturalist, author

Ronald Mathias Lockley (8 November 1903 – 12 April 2000) was a Welsh ornithologist and naturalist. He wrote over fifty books on natural history, including a study of shearwaters, and the book The Private Life of the Rabbit, which was used in the development of his friend Richard Adams's children's book Watership Down.

== Life and career ==
Lockley was born in Cardiff and grew up in the suburb of Whitchurch, where his mother ran a boarding school. While still at school, he spent his weekends and summer holidays living rough in the woods and wetlands that now form the Glamorganshire Canal local nature reserve.

After leaving school, he established a small poultry farm with his sister near St Mellons, Cardiff.

His son is the palaeontologist Martin Lockley.

== Skokholm ==
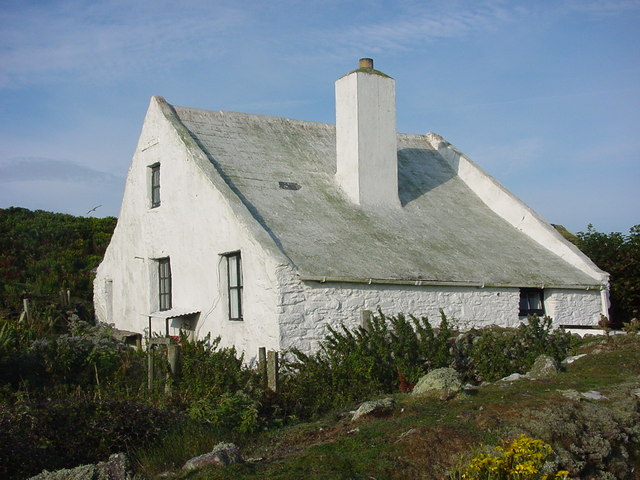
Lockley House on Skokholm, the UK's first bird observatory, rebuilt and lived in by Ronald Lockley

In 1927, with his first wife Doris Shellard, he took a 21-year lease of Skokholm, a small island some 4 kilometres (2.5 mi) off the western tip of Pembrokeshire, which was inhabited only by rabbits and seabirds. Attempts to make a living from catching and selling rabbits and breeding chinchilla rabbits were abandoned when he found he could make a better living writing articles and books. He began to study migratory birds from 1928, establishing the first British bird observatory in 1933, and carrying out extensive pioneering research on breeding Manx shearwaters, Atlantic puffins and European storm-petrels. He was encouraged to record the exact incubation and fledging period of the Manx shearwater by Harry Witherby, the then editor of British Birds.

He provided the initial catalyst for the British Bird Observatory movement which, following the wartime interruption, reached its zenith in the fifties. He described his research in several books, including Dream Island (1930), Island Days (1934) and I Know an Island (1938). The work brought him to the notice of a wider circle of conservationists and naturalists, among them Peter Scott and Julian Huxley. Lockley's notable scientific monograph Shearwaters is a result of a twelve years' study. He founded the Pembrokeshire Bird Protection Society which later became the West Wales Field Society. He urged the broadening of the activities of the original Society and the extension of its area to include the whole of West Wales and it was at his insistence that the West Wales Field Society was incorporated as the West Wales Naturalists' Trust.

With Julian Huxley he made one of the first professional (BFI) nature films, The Private Life of the Gannets (1934), which won an Oscar.

== Postwar ==
Lockley continued farming on the mainland when Skokholm was used by the military during the Second World War. He played a key part in the preliminary survey of the natural history of Skomer Island in 1946, re-establishing Skokholm as a bird observatory and establishing the Council for the Promotion of Field Studies in Dale Fort. He played a role in setting up the Pembrokeshire Coast National Park in 1952, and in mapping out the coastal footpath around the county. Living at Orielton, a large estate near Pembroke, he undertook a four-year scientific study of rabbit behaviour for the British Nature Conservancy during the 1950s. As chairman of the West Wales Field Society, he also led an unsuccessful campaign against the building of a large oil refinery at Milford Haven.

His belief that successive British governments were not sufficiently aware of the threat to the landscape from industrial development led to his decision to emigrate to New Zealand in 1970, with his third wife. There he continued to write, mostly about islands and birds, but also novels, and to travel among the islands of Polynesia and in the Antarctic.

Lockley was awarded an Honorary MSc by the University of Wales in 1977, in recognition of his distinction as a naturalist. In 1993 he was awarded the Union Medal of the British Ornithologists' Union. He died in 2000, aged 96. His ashes were scattered from the boat Dale Princess, in the waters just off Skokholm Island in 2000.

== In popular culture ==
Lockley's The Private Life of the Rabbit (1964) played a role in the plot development of his friend Richard Adams's children's book Watership Down. The New York Times obituary observed "It was a rigorously factual work with none of the anthropomorphic sentimentality that infused Watership with its charm, but it bristled with insights." With Lockley's permission, Adams introduced him (alongside Sir Peter Scott) as a character in his later novel The Plague Dogs (1977).

== Bibliography ==
Books authored or coauthored by Lockley:

- 1930: Dream Island. Witherby: London.
- 1932: The Island Dwellers. G. P. Putnam's Sons: London.
- 1934: Island Days. Witherby: London.
- 1936: The Sea's a Thief. Longman: London
- 1936: Birds of the Green Belt and the Country around London. Witherby: London.
- 1938: I Know an Island. George G. Harrap: London.
- 1939: Early Morning Island – or a dish of sprats. George G. Harrap: London.
- 1940: A Pot of Smoke. Being the Life and Adventures of Dan Owain as Told to R.M. Lockley. George G. Harrap: London.
- 1941: The Way to an Island J M Dent: London.
- 1942: Shearwaters. J. M. Dent: London.
- 1943: Dream Island Days. Witherby: London.
- 1943: Inland Farm. Witherby: London.
- 1945: Islands Round Britain. Collins: London.
- 1945: Birds of the Sea. Penguin Books: London. (With R.B. Talbot Kelly).
- 1946: The Island Farmers. Witherby: London.
- 1947: Letters from Skokholm. J. M. Dent: London.
- 1948: The Cinnamon Bird. Staples Press: London. (Illustrated by Charles Tunnicliffe).
- 1948: The Golden Year. Witherby: London.
- 1948: The Birds of Pembrokeshire. Compiled for West Wales Field Society ( With GCS Ingram & H Morrey Salmon)
- 1949: Natural History of Selborne. Introduction & notes by Lockley. Dent: London (Everyman's Library No.48).
- 1950: The Charm of the Channel Islands. Evans Brothers: London.
- 1950: Island of Skomer. Staples Press: London. (With John Buxton).
- 1951: The Nature-lovers' Anthology. Edited by Lockley.
- 1953: Bird Ringing. The Art of Bird Study by Individual Marking. Crosby Lockwood & Son: London. (With Rosemary Russell).
- 1953: Puffins. Dent: London.
- 1953: Travels with A Tent in Western Europe. Odhams Press: London.
- 1954: Gilbert White. Witherby: London. (Great Naturalists series)
- 1954: The Seals and the Curragh. Introducing the Natural History of the Grey Seal of the North Atlantic. Dent: London.
- 1954: Seabirds. (New Naturalist No.28) Collins: London. (With James Fisher).
- 1957: Pembrokeshire. (Regional Books series). Robert Hale: London.
- 1957: In Praise of Islands. An anthology for friends. Frederick Muller: London.
- 1958: The Bird-lover's Bedside Book. Eyre & Spottiswoode: London. Edited by RML.
- 1961: Pan Book of Cage Birds. Pan Books: London.
- 1964: Britain in Colour. Batsford Books: London.
- 1964: The Private Life of the Rabbit. Andre Deutsch: London. (A Survival Book.)
- 1966: Grey Seal, Common Seal. Andre Deutsch: London. (A Survival Book.)
- 1966: Wales. Batsford: London.
- 1967: Animal navigation. Arthur Barker: London.
- 1968: The Book of Bird Watching. Arthur Barker: London.
- 1968: The Travellers Guide to the Channel Islands. Jonathan Cape: London
- 1969: The Island. Andre Deutsch: London.
- 1970: Man Against Nature. Andre Deutsch: London. (A Survival Book.)
- 1970: The Naturalist in Wales. David & Charles: Newton Abbot.
- 1971: A Traveller's Guide to the Channel Islands. (Corgi – 0552086479)
- 1974: Ocean Wanderers. The migratory sea birds of the world. David & Charles: Newton Abbot.
- 1974: Seal Woman. Rex Collings: London.
- 1977: Orielton: The Human and Natural History of a Welsh Manor. Andre Deutsch: London.
- 1979: Myself When Young: The Making of a Naturalist. Andre Deutsch: London.
- 1979: Whales, Dolphins and Porpoises. David & Charles: Newton Abbot.
- 1980: The House Above the Sea. Longman Paul: New Zealand.
- 1980: New Zealand Endangered Species. Birds, Bats, Reptiles, Freshwater Fishes, Snails and Insects. Cassell New Zealand. (With Noel W. Cusa)
- 1982: Voyage through the Antarctic. Allen Lane: London. (With Richard Adams)
- 1982: New Zealand Birds. (With Geoff Moon) Heinemann.
- 1983: Eric Hosking's Seabirds. (Text by Lockley) Croom Helm: London.
- 1983: The Flight of the Storm Petrel. David & Charles: London.
- 1986: Voyage Through the Antarctic by Lockley and Richard Adams.
- 1987: The Lodge above the Waterfall. Divach Press: Drumnadrochit.
- 1987: The Secrets of Natural New Zealand. Viking Press: Auckland. (With Betty Brownlie)
- 1991: Birds and Islands. Travels in Wild Places. Witherby: London.
- 1996: Dear Islandman. Compiled by Lockley. Gomer Press: Llandysul.

He was also a writer of articles, many of them for Countryman magazine in the 1930s, 40s and 50s.

A 1947 edition of I Know an Island was illustrated by James Lucas.
