= Wildlife Trust of South and West Wales =

Wildlife Trust in Wales

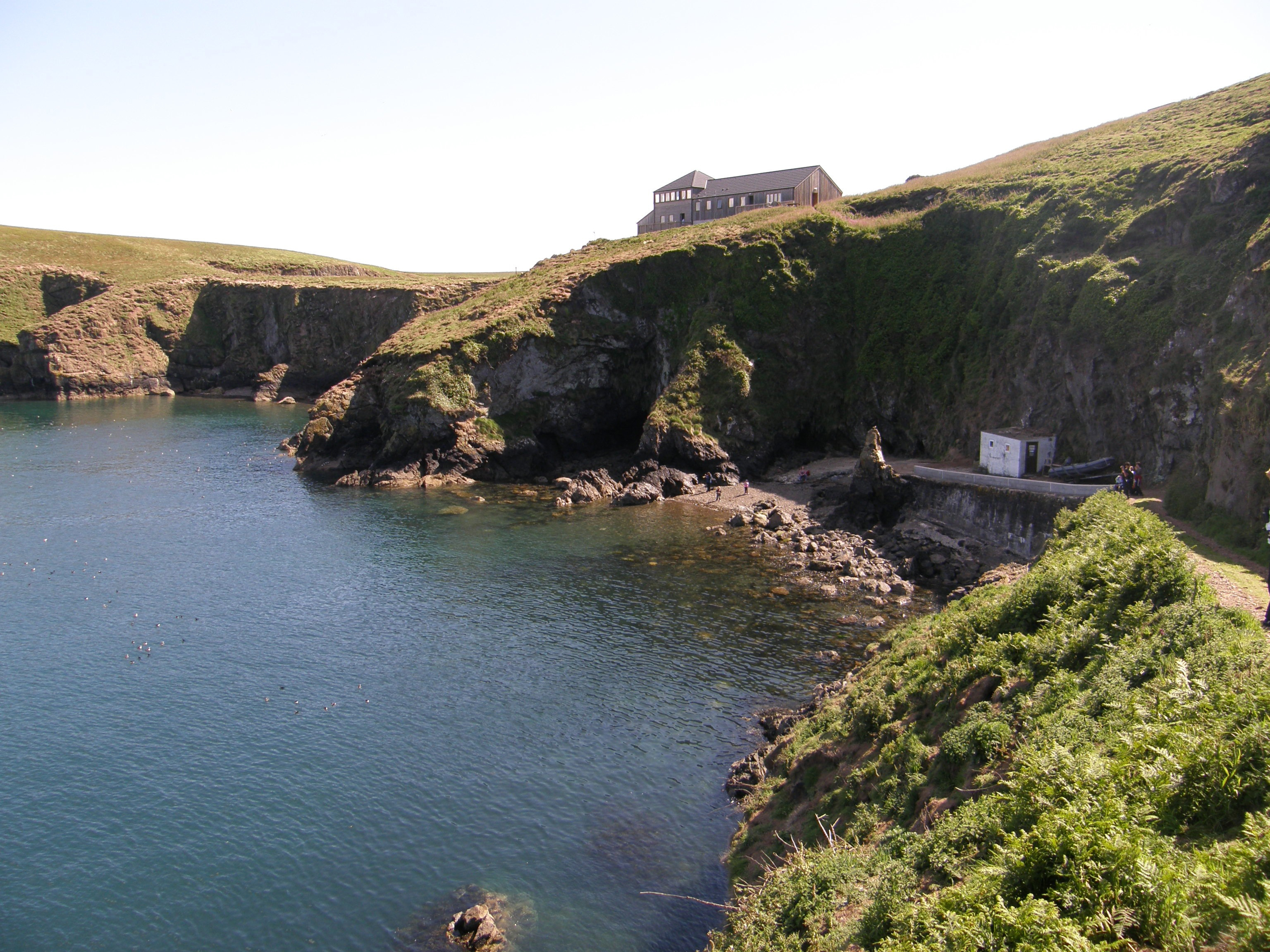
- The Isle of Skomer, Pembrokeshire, a Wildlife Trust of South and West Wales reserve
- Company type: Conservation charity
- Area served: South and West Wales

The Wildlife Trust of South and West Wales (WTSWW) (Welsh: Ymddiriedolaeth Natur De a Gorllewin Cymru) is a Wildlife Trust in south and west Wales, one of 46 such Trusts in the United Kingdom.

== History ==
Forerunner of the WTSWW, the former West Wales Naturalists' Trust traces its origin to a meeting held in Haverfordwest in February 1938. It was convened by L. D. Whitehead, the Welsh industrialist and owner of Ramsey, and the naturalist and author R. M. Lockley, then living on Skokholm. Seventy-eight people were present at that inaugural meeting and on the motion of Mr. Hugh Lloyd-Philipps, of Dale Castle, the Pembrokeshire Bird Protection Society was formed.

In 1943, the society was urged to promote the establishment of nature reserves in readiness for post-war conditions. A meeting in 1945 decided to widen its area, so as to cover the counties of Pembroke, Carmarthen, Cardigan, and Merioneth, in compliance with requests from those counties, and considered a selection of alternative names so as to indicate the extension of the Society's area and activities. The meeting favoured West Wales Field Society. The society purchased Dale Fort which it leased to the Council for the Promotion of Field Studies in August 1946. An arrangement was made in 1947 for the CPFS to operate the Bird Observatory on Skokholm. Dale Fort was sold to the Field Studies Council in 1959.

In January, 1961, the Executive Council formerly resolved to recommend that the Society should be dissolved and reconstituted as the West Wales Naturalists Trust Ltd. In April 2018 it merged with the Brecknock Wildlife Trust to become the WTSWW.

The Wildlife Trust of South and West Wales is a membership organisation with charitable status. The trust is works with volunteers and communities to protect habitats and species. Their work includes reviewing planning applications, managing over 80 reserves, and providing advice to a wide variety of groups.

== Coverage ==
WTSWW work in the Vice-counties of Glamorgan, Carmarthenshire, Pembrokeshire, Cardiganshire and Brecknockshire. The suite of reserves includes the Melincwrt waterfalls (near Neath), Coed y Bwl (daffodil woods near Cardiff), Teifi Marshes (near Cardigan, including the Welsh Wildlife Centre, which has a cafe and shop, and is on the Cardigan-Cilgerran Offshoot trail of the Pembrokeshire Coast Path), Castle Woods in Llandeilo (with castle), and the islands of Skomer and Skokholm.

== Attacks ==
In September 2019 arsonists burnt down a Kingfisher Hide at the Welsh Wildlife Centre, damage which came at a cost of £20,000 to the Trust. On New Year's Day 2020, the site was again attacked by vandals, who damaged a badger sculpture.
