= James Lucas (illustrator) =

British illustrator and teacher

- Born: James Edward Lucas; 20 December 1903; Rugby, Warwickshire, England
- Occupations: Illustrator; Teacher
- Years active: 1930s
- Organization: Communist Party of Great Britain
- Spouse: Phyllis Ladyman

James Edward Lucas (born 20 December 1903) was a British illustrator and teacher, affiliated with the Communist Party of Great Britain (CPGB).

Lucas was born in Rugby, the son of Joseph Lucas, an engine driver, and Anne Marie Sail. His father died in 1906 and his mother remarried William Skipworth. Electrical engineer George Sail Campbell Lucas OBE was his elder brother.

Lucas did not sign much of his work, making attribution difficult.

He designed a banner for the British Battalion of the International Brigades, on behalf of the Artists International. Phyllis Ladyman, his wife and also an illustrator, oversaw its embroidering. The banner's poles had metal finials by the sculptor Betty Rea. It was presented to the battalion by Harry Pollitt at Christmas 1937. When that banner was captured, he designed its replacement. The replacement banner was shown as part of the Conscience and Conflict: British Artists and the Spanish Civil War exhibition at the Pallant House Gallery in 2015.

He is also known for his engraving for the cover of early editions of The Country Standard. He illustrated a 1947 edition of Ronald M. Lockley's I Know an Island.

He taught at Plymouth, where one of his pupils was Reg Turner, another CPGB affiliate.

Dave Cope recalled him as "modest" and the "most political" among his artistic CPGB peers.
