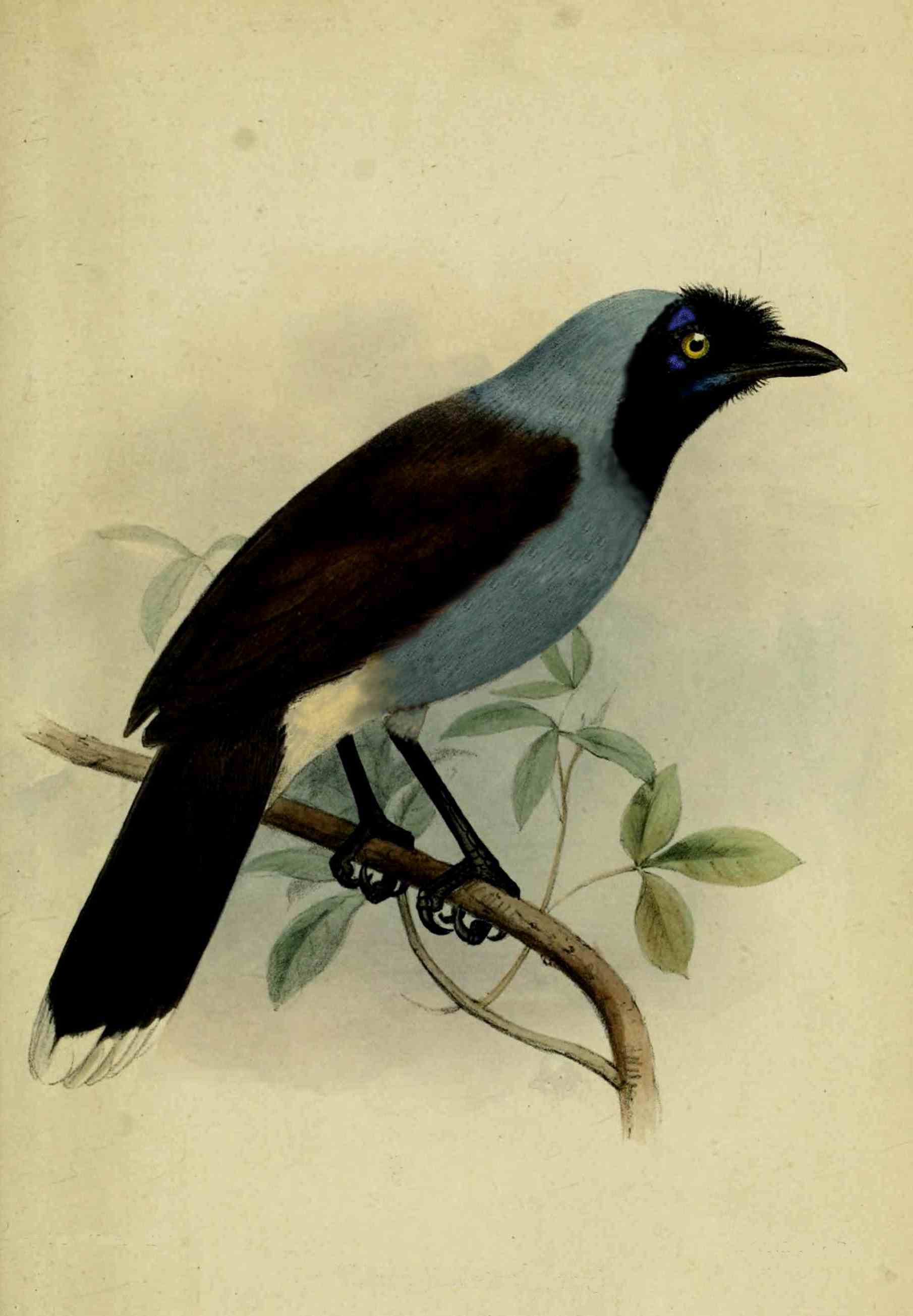
- Speculative redrawing of an azure-naped jay illustration in the colours of a Campina jay

Conservation status
- Near Threatened (IUCN 3.1)

Scientific classification
- Kingdom: Animalia
- Phylum: Chordata
- Class: Aves
- Order: Passeriformes
- Family: Corvidae
- Genus: Cyanocorax
- Species: C. hafferi

Binomial name
- Cyanocorax hafferi Cohn-Haft et al., 2013

= Campina jay =

Species of bird

The Campina jay (Cyanocorax hafferi) is a passerine from the genus Cyanocorax, a group of jays which occur in the Neotropics. It was first discovered in August 2002 by Mario Cohn-Haft but stayed unrecognised for two and a half years until the holotype was collected in January 2005. In 2013, this species was formally described in the Handbook of the Birds of the World. The species' epithet commemorates Dr. Jürgen Haffer, an ornithologist from Germany, best known for his Pleistocene refugia hypothesis developed in 1969. The common name campina refers to its specific habitat, a cerrado-like open savanna in the Amazon River basin in Brazil.

The HBW and Birdlife checklist recognizes campina jay as a separate species. The other three taxonomic authorities - Howard & Moore, EBird/Clements and the IOC - consider it to be a subspecies of azure-naped jay.

== Distribution ==
The Campina jay is endemic to the Brazilian Amazon where it is known almost entirely from within the Madeira-Purus interfluve in the state of Amazonas.
