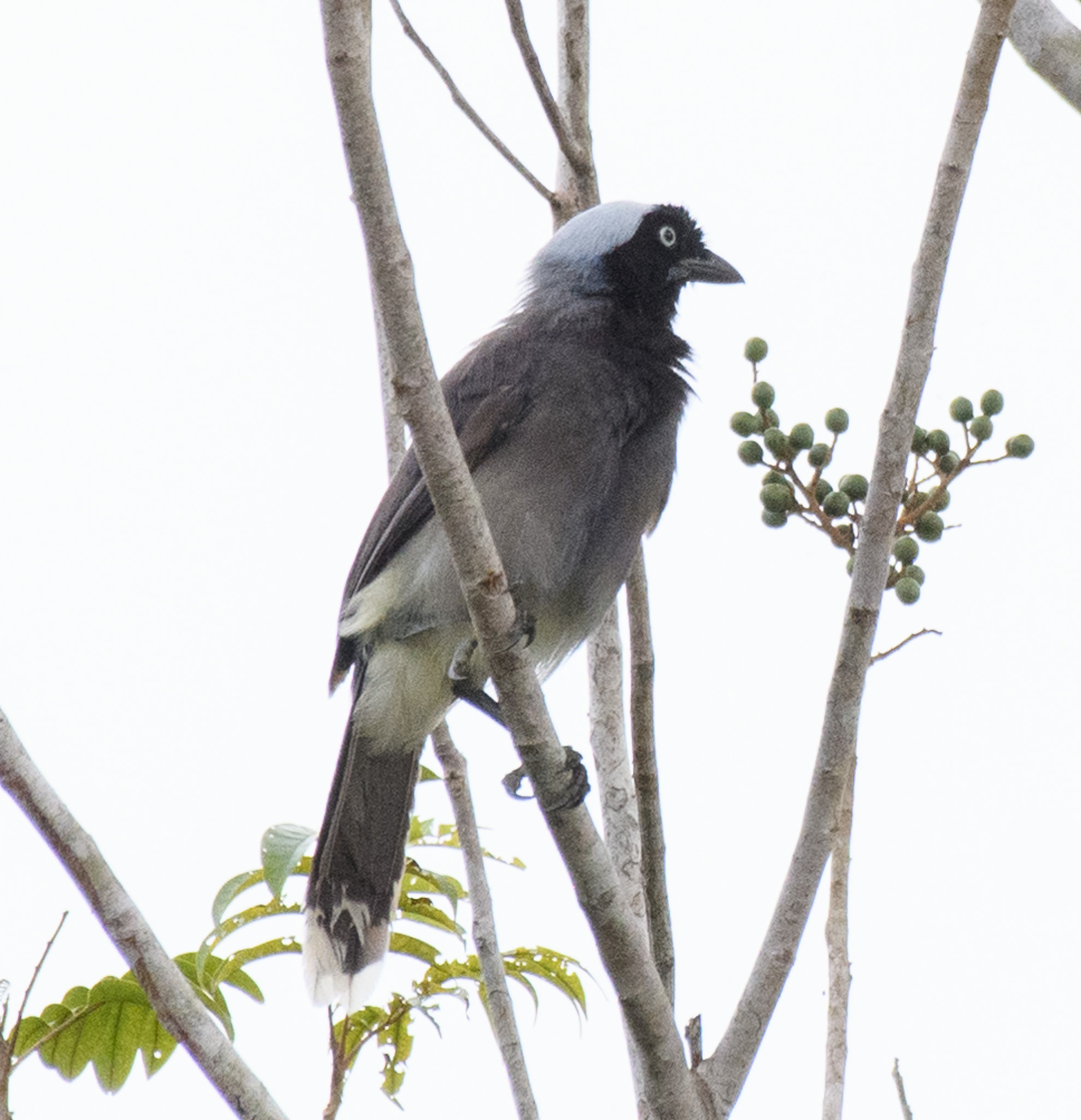
- Photo taken east of Mitú, Colombia

Conservation status
- Least Concern (IUCN 3.1)

Scientific classification
- Kingdom: Animalia
- Phylum: Chordata
- Class: Aves
- Order: Passeriformes
- Family: Corvidae
- Genus: Cyanocorax
- Species: C. heilprini

Binomial name
- Cyanocorax heilprini A. F. Gentry, 1885

= Azure-naped jay =

Species of bird

The azure-naped jay (Cyanocorax heilprini) is a species of bird in the family Corvidae. It is found in Brazil, Colombia, and Venezuela.

Its natural habitats are subtropical or tropical moist lowland forest and subtropical or tropical dry shrubland.

== Taxonomy ==
The Azure-naped jay was first described by Alan F. Gentry based on a single specimen, marked as a male, from the T. B. Wilson Collection of the Academy of Natural Sciences of Philadelphia.

The genus Cyanocorax comes from the Ancient Greek kuanos (dark blue) and korax (raven). The species epithet heilprini honours Gentry's friend, Professor Angelo Heilprin. There are two identified subspecies:

- C. h. heilprini. The nominate subspecies.
- C. h. hafferi. This subspecies, Campina Jay, was described as a new species in 2013, but the South American Classification Committee of the American Ornithologists' Union did not support the proposal.

== Description ==
The back is dark brown, as are the upper sides of the wings and tail. The rear crown and nape are bright lavender blue. The front and sides of the head are black, with the feathers of the forecrown and forehead curled up and forwards in a short bushy crest. From the chin to the centre of the breast the bird is dark violaceous-grey. The lower breast and belly are violaceous, fading to white on the lower belly and vent. The eyes are pale to yellowish-white and the bill, feet and legs are black.

== Distribution and habitat ==
This species is a native resident species of the Amazon basin, found from Southeast Colombia to Southwest Venezuela (Amazonas) and extreme northwest Brazil.

It is a bird of the lower tropical zone, found at altitudes of 250m and below. Its preferred habitat is stunted forests, forest edges and second growth on sandy soils in the upper Río Negro basin, as well as in lighter savannah woodland. Two recent surveys of birds Amazon basin found the Azure-naped jay is endemic to areas of white sand forest, and is not found in nearby areas of nearby terra firme forests, seasonally flooded forests and Amazonian savannas.

== Behaviour ==
These birds are found in noisy groups that travel slowly, foraging at all levels. They are wary of observers and will utter alarm cries, taking turns to observe an intruder before moving on, or simply disappear into surrounding vegetation.

== Status ==
The azure-naped jay is rated a species of Least Concern by Birdlife International, because it occurs over a very large range and the population, though declining, is not thought to be declining rapidly enough to reach the threshold of Vulnerable status.

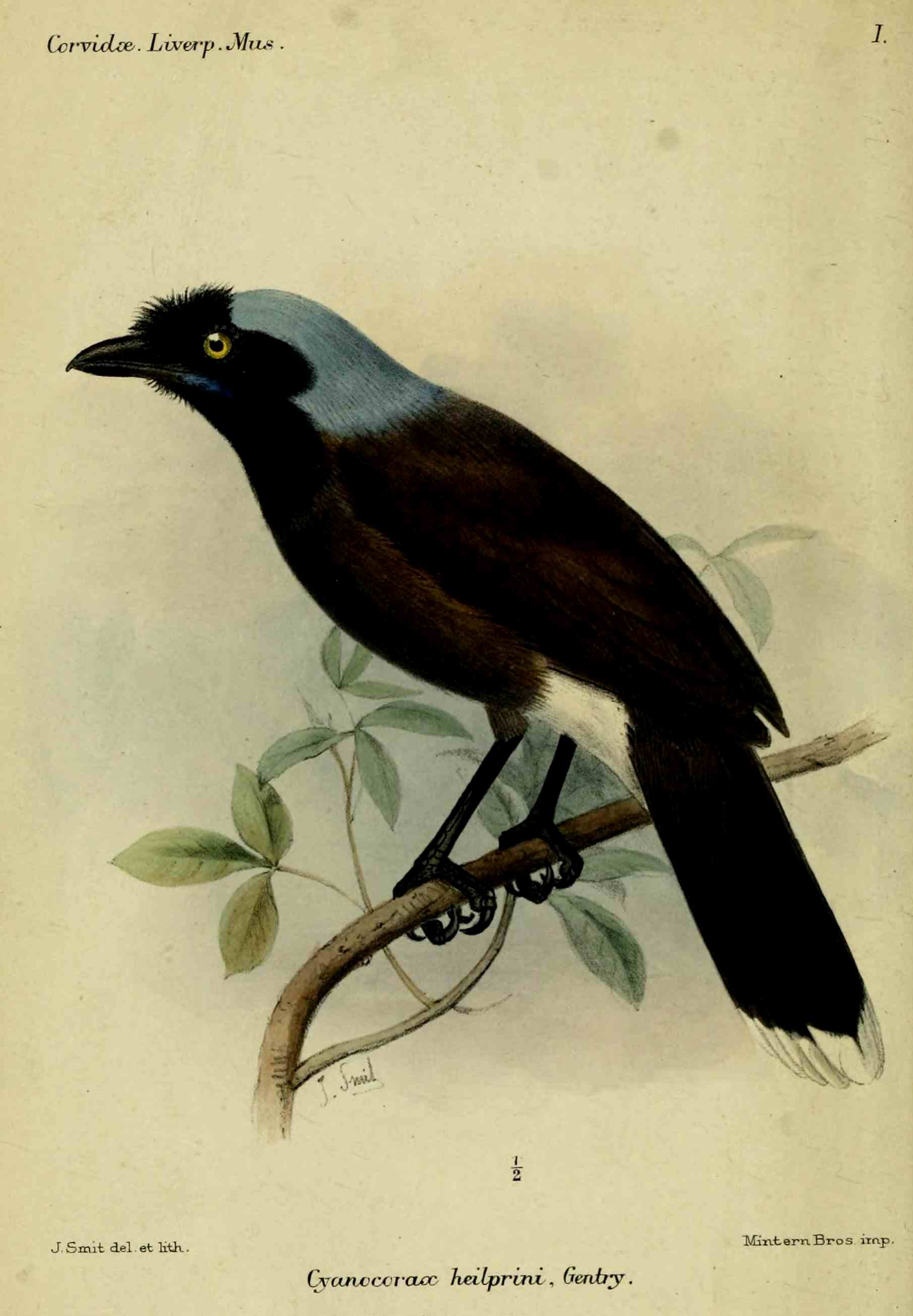
Azure-naped Jay
