= Jürgen Haffer =

German ornithologist and geologist

Jürgen Haffer (9 December 1932 in Berlin – 26 April 2010 in Essen) was a German ornithologist, biogeographer, and geologist. He is most remembered for his theory of Amazonian forest refugia during the Pleistocene that would have contributed to speciation and the diversification of the biota.

== Biography ==
At the age of 13 Haffer found a dead bird with a ring and had taken it to the Berlin Museum where he met Erwin Stresemann who took time to explain to him the purpose of ringing. This made a big impression on him and it marked the beginning of his ornithological interest.

He was the fourth child of Oskar Haffer and Margarete. His father was a high school teacher with a training in biology who encouraged an interest in natural history. After schooling, Haffer worked during the summer of 1951 under Stresemann before going to university. Knowing that ornithology did not offer a career, he studied geology and paleontology. He obtained a Diploma in 1956 and continued on for a doctoral degree in 1957 at the University of Göttingen - working on "Early heterodont Lamellibranchs of the Rhineland Devonian".

He obtained employment with Mobil Oil as a field geologist and went to remote places like lowland Colombia and lived in South and North America, Iran, Egypt, and Norway. During his stay in Colombia he met Maria Kluge, a teacher in Bogotá with an interest in Amazonia, marrying her in 1959. During this time he studied the bird faunas of Amazonia and Iran. In close communication with evolutionary biologist Ernst Mayr since the early 1960s, Haffer formulated his ideas on the diversification of birds and the effects of barriers. In 1978 Beryl B. Simpson and Haffer published their analysis of speciation patterns in Amazonia.

From his studies on the Amazonian avifauna, Haffer authored several papers on Neotropical ornithology and devised his Amazonian refugia theory to explain the rapid diversification of the Neotropical fauna in Pleistocene times. He used the toucanet of the genus Selenidera to explain speciation using the idea of refugia. Haffer's scientific output was substantial, with some 200 scientific publications.

Haffer wrote the first book-length biography of Ernst Mayr and co-authored a biography of Erwin Stresemann, Mayr's teacher and friend. Haffer's foreword on species concepts is included in volume 4 of the Handbook of the Birds of the World. He also wrote extensively on the history and development of ornithology. In 1975, he was awarded the William Brewster Memorial Award.

In 2013, Haffer was commemorated with the newly described Campina jay, Cyanocorax hafferi.

== Sources ==
- Haffer, Jurgen (1969). Speciation in Amazonian Forest Birds. Science. Vol. 165:131-137.
