= Dale, Pembrokeshire =

Village and community in Pembrokeshire, Wales

Dale
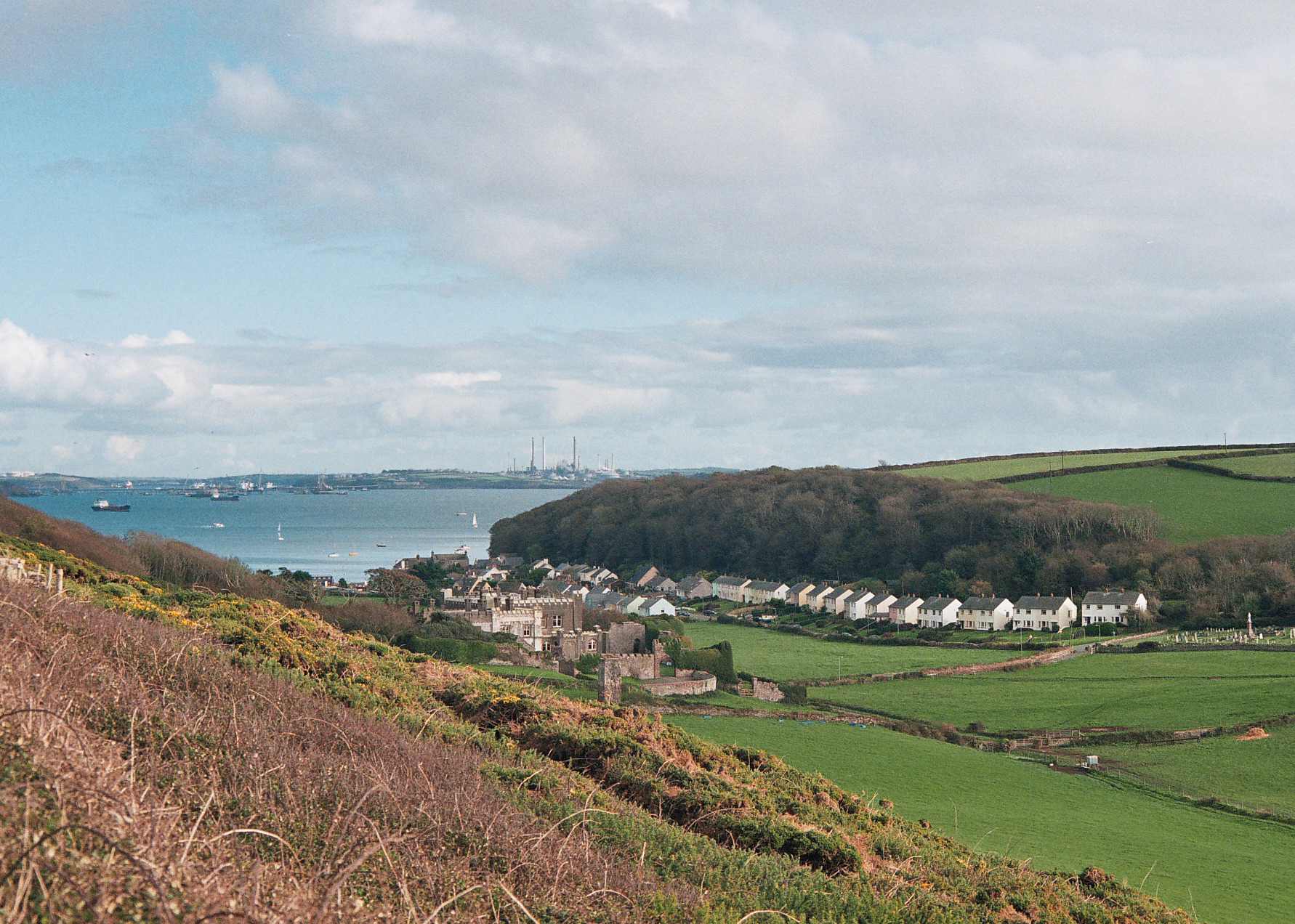
- View over the village, towards Milford Haven and the Pembroke Refinery

- Location within Pembrokeshire
- Population: 225 (2011)
- OS grid reference: SM809057
- Principal area: Pembrokeshire
- Preserved county: Dyfed
- Country: Wales
- Sovereign state: United Kingdom
- Post town: Haverfordwest
- Postcode district: SA62
- Dialling code: 01646
- Police: Dyfed-Powys
- Fire: Mid and West Wales
- Ambulance: Welsh
- UK Parliament: Preseli Pembrokeshire
- Senedd Cymru – Welsh Parliament: Preseli Pembrokeshire
- List of places UK Wales Pembrokeshire 51.71°N 5.17°W Map of the community

Dale is a small village and community in Pembrokeshire, Wales, located on the peninsula which forms the northern side of the entrance to the Milford Haven Waterway. The village has 205 inhabitants according to the 2001 census, increasing to 225 at the 2011 Census.

== History ==
It was once a marcher borough, controlled by the Norman de Vale family from the 13th century Dale Castle. Owen, in 1603, described it as one of nine Pembrokeshire "boroughs in decay". Located in the hundred of Roose, it is part of Little England beyond Wales and has been English-speaking since the 12th century. The name (Old Norse: Dalr = "valley") suggests prior occupation by Scandinavians. The nearby RAF Dale airfield was active from 1941 to 1948. Following cessation of activities in World War II, RAF Dale was decommissioned, and the site became occupied by the Fleet Air Arm as RNAS Dale (HMS Goldcrest), a satellite of HMS Goldcrest at RNAS Brawdy.

=== Henry Tudor ===
In 1485, Henry Tudor landed at Mill Bay near Dale before the Battle of Bosworth, after which he became King Henry VII. Villagers mark the anniversary; the most spectacular commemoration was for the 500th anniversary in 1985.

=== Sea Empress disaster ===
On 15 February 1996, the oil tanker Sea Empress grounded at the Milford Haven entrance, spilling 72,000 tonnes of crude oil.

=== Housing ===
There are many older Victorian homes towards the coastal shore area but away from the shore there are late 1940s council houses.

== Present ==
Dale Fort is a Victorian era fort located on a rocky promontory that now houses a field studies centre, for study of local marine biology, biology, geology, geomorphology, and other related fields.

Dale is a local centre for sailing, and windsurfing is taught in the Dale bay, along with sailing and boat handling courses. Dale is also often the location of sailing galas. The Pembrokeshire Coast Path passes through the village and around the Dale peninsula.

Dale beach has a Blue Flag award.

The Dale Coronation Hall is used for many events in the community and is home to the D.A.D.S. (Dale Amateur Dramatic Society). The society performs a play or a pantomime in March.

The 2011 census showed 5.9% of the population could speak Welsh, a fall from 11.0% in 2001.

The community includes Skokholm Island.

== Climate ==
Climate data for Dale Fort (33m elevation) 1991–2020
Month	Jan	Feb	Mar	Apr	May	Jun	Jul	Aug	Sep	Oct	Nov	Dec	Year
Mean daily maximum °C (°F)	8.9 (48.0)	9.0 (48.2)	10.4 (50.7)	13.1 (55.6)	15.5 (59.9)	17.9 (64.2)	19.4 (66.9)	19.2 (66.6)	17.9 (64.2)	14.9 (58.8)	11.8 (53.2)	9.6 (49.3)	13.9 (57.0)
Mean daily minimum °C (°F)	5.1 (41.2)	4.4 (39.9)	4.9 (40.8)	6.6 (43.9)	8.9 (48.0)	11.5 (52.7)	13.3 (55.9)	13.4 (56.1)	12.2 (54.0)	10.3 (50.5)	7.5 (45.5)	5.9 (42.6)	8.6 (47.5)
Average precipitation mm (inches)	99.9 (3.93)	72.5 (2.85)	74.9 (2.95)	55.1 (2.17)	64.1 (2.52)	60.8 (2.39)	67.8 (2.67)	84.3 (3.32)	67.4 (2.65)	112.4 (4.43)	126.2 (4.97)	105.0 (4.13)	987.9 (38.89)
Average precipitation days	15.68	11.81	11.94	9.20	9.49	9.08	10.16	11.39	10.26	14.53	17.17	15.47	146.09
Source: Meteo Climat
