= Stresemann's bent-toed gecko =

Conservation status
- Data Deficient (IUCN 3.1)

Scientific classification
- Kingdom: Animalia
- Phylum: Chordata
- Order: Squamata
- Suborder: Gekkota
- Family: Gekkonidae
- Genus: Cyrtodactylus
- Species: C. stresemanni

Binomial name
- Cyrtodactylus stresemanni Rösler & Glaw, 2008

Species of lizard

Stresemann's bent-toed gecko (Cyrtodactylus stresemanni) is a species of lizard in the family Gekkonidae. The species is endemic to Malaysia.

== Etymology ==
The specific name, stresemanni, is in honor of German ornithologist Erwin Friedrich Theodor Stresemann.

== Geographic range ==
C. stresemanni is found in Perak, Malaysia.

== Habitat ==
The preferred natural habitat of C. stresemanni is forest.

== Description ==
Medium-sized for its genus, C. stresemanni may attain a snout-to-vent length (SVL) of 9.5 cm (3.7 in) and a total length (including tail) of 19 cm (7.5 in).

== Reproduction ==
C. stresemanni is oviparous.
