= Coed y Bwl =

Protected area in Glamorgan, Wales

- Site of Special Scientific Interest
- Location within Wales
- Location of Coed y Bwl.
- Area of search: Mid and South Glamorgan
- Grid reference: SS9093075103
- Coordinates: 51.464354°N 3.5714895°W
- Interest: Biological
- Area: 2.42 ha (6.0 acres)
- Notification date: 1 January 1972

Coed y Bwl is a Site of Special Scientific Interest in Glamorgan, south Wales. The site is managed by The Wildlife Trust of South and West Wales. It is an ancient ash woodland on the northwest side of the Alun Valley and overlies Carboniferous limestone.

== See also ==
- List of Sites of Special Scientific Interest in Mid & South Glamorgan
