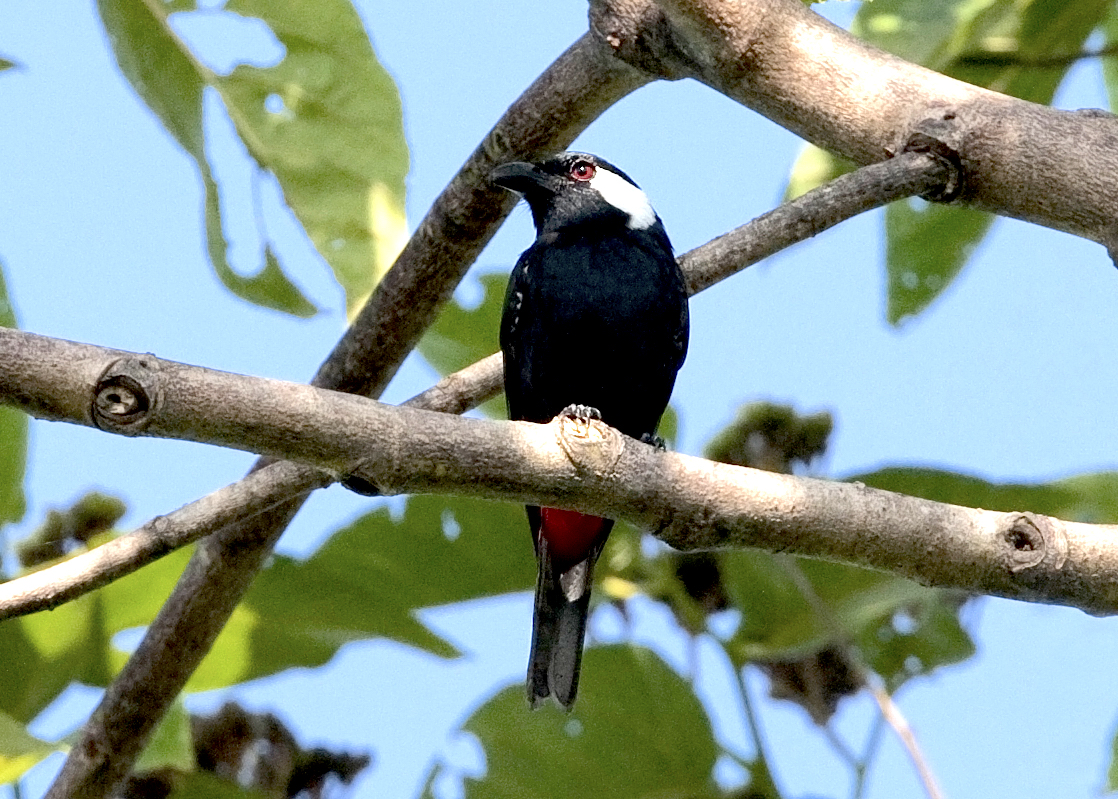

Conservation status
- Least Concern (IUCN 3.1)

Scientific classification
- Kingdom: Animalia
- Phylum: Chordata
- Class: Aves
- Order: Passeriformes
- Family: Artamidae
- Subfamily: Cracticinae
- Genus: Peltops
- Species: P. blainvillii

Binomial name
- Peltops blainvillii (Lesson & Garnot, 1827)

= Lowland peltops =

Species of bird

The lowland peltops or clicking shieldbill (Peltops blainvillii) is a species of bird in the family Artamidae. It is found in Indonesia and Papua New Guinea. Its natural habitat is subtropical or tropical moist lowland forest.
