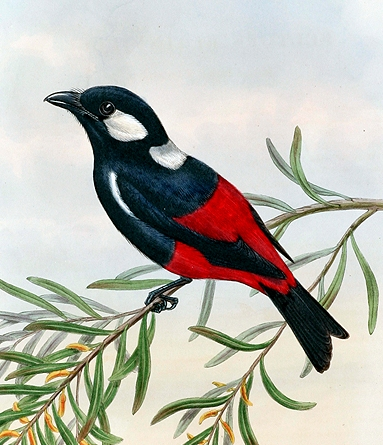
- Lowland peltops (Peltops blainvillii)

Scientific classification
- Kingdom: Animalia
- Phylum: Chordata
- Class: Aves
- Order: Passeriformes
- Family: Artamidae
- Subfamily: Cracticinae
- Genus: Peltops; Wagler, 1829

Type species
- Eurylaimus blainvillii Lesson & Garnot, 1827

Species
- Peltops blainvillii Peltops montanus

= Peltops =

Genus of birds

Peltops is a genus of birds in the family Artamidae. It contains two species that are endemic to the island of New Guinea. The species have also had the common name of shieldbill.

== Taxonomy ==
The genus Peltops was introduced by the German zoologist Johann Georg Wagler in 1829. The type species is the lowland peltops. The name is from the Greek pelte meaning small shield and ops meaning face. The genus was once placed with the monarch flycatchers, but molecular and morphometric studies place it closer to the butcherbirds, possibly as a sister taxon to this group. The genus is placed in its own subfamily, Peltopsinae.

The genus contains two species:

Image	Scientific name	Common name	Distribution
	Peltops blainvillii	Lowland peltops	lowland New Guinea.
	Peltops montanus	Mountain peltops	New Guinea Highlands

== Description ==
Peltops are smaller than the butcherbirds, and have a less massive but still large bill. The mountain peltops is the larger species, at 20 cm (7.9 in), whereas the lowland peltops is slightly smaller at 18 to 19 cm (7.1–7.5 in). The hooked bill is the same size in both species, making it proportionally larger in the lowland peltops.

== Distribution and habitat ==
Both species occupy rainforest on New Guinea, but are separated by altitude. The lowland peltops ranges across the island from sea level to 600 m (2,000 ft), whereas the mountain peltops ranges from 600 to 3,000 m (2,000–9,800 ft). Within the forest they are particularly common at forest openings and edges, tree falls, river edges, and other disturbed areas including human modified openings like roads and gardens. In undisturbed virgin forest they may use massive trees emerging from and above the canopy.
