= Artists' International Association =

The Artists' International Association (AIA) was an organisation founded in London in 1933 out of discussion among Pearl Binder, Clifford Rowe, Misha Black, James Fitton, James Boswell, James Holland, Edward Ardizzone, Peter Laszlo Peri and Edith Simon.

== History ==
The first meeting took place in Misha Black's room at Seven Dials. Originally, it was called Artists' International, but it added the word Association to its name when it was reconstituted in 1935.

Essentially set up as a radically left political organisation, the AIA embraced all styles of art, both modernist and traditional, but the core committee preferenced realism. Its later aim was to promote the "Unity of Artists for Peace, Democracy and Cultural Development". They held a series of large group exhibitions on political and social themes. Their first exhibition was hosted in a showroom on Charlotte Street in 1934, entitled The Social Scene. In 1935, they nailed their radical politics to the mast with an exhibition entitled Artists Against Fascism and War.

The AIA supported the left-wing Republican side in the Spanish Civil War through exhibitions and other fund-raising activities. The Association was also involved in the settling of artists displaced by the Nazi regime in Germany. Many of those linked with the Association, such as Duncan Grant were also pacifists.

By 1936 the membership had grown to around one thousand artists from the original group of thirty-two. In 1940 the group launched their Everyman Prints scheme where prints were sold cheaply to the masses, and made available in high street shops, and not in galleries.

It continued until 1971, but abandoned its original objectives in 1953 and became an exhibiting society. Diana Uhlman had begun to administer the organisation's gallery in Soho. She was the gallery's secretary and notably helped the artists Edward Ardizzone and David Gentleman. She continued in this role until 1957.

Another of the AIA's aims was to promote wider access to art through travelling exhibitions and public mural paintings.

== See also ==
- James Lucas (illustrator) - designed banner on behalf of the AIA
- Association of Revolutionary Visual Artists
