= Welsh Wildlife Centre =

Nature reserve in Wales

- Canolfan Bywyd Gwyllt Cymru
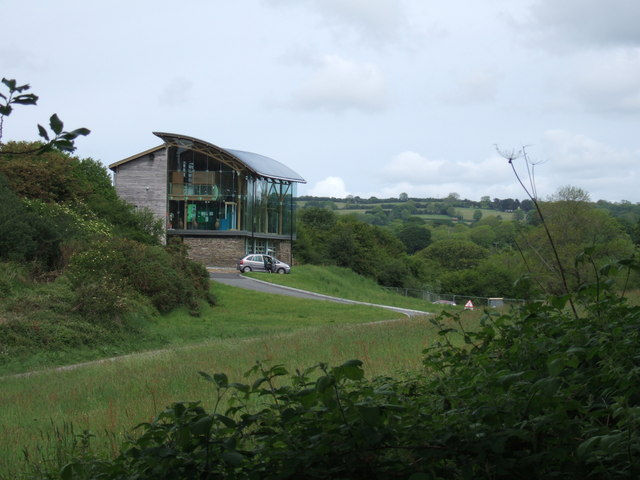
- Welsh Wildlife Centre, Cilgerran

- Location within Wales
- Location: Cilgerran, Wales
- Nearest town: Cardigan, Wales
- Coordinates: 52.074°N 4.645°W
- Area: 264 acres (107 ha)
- Opened: 1993
- Operator: Wildlife Trust of South & West Wales
- Visitors: 80,000 (in 2019)
- Awards: Visit Wales Gold Accolade (2016)
- Hiking trails: Cardigan-Cilgerran Offshoot (Pembrokeshire Coastal Path)
- Website: welshwildlife.org/visitor-centres/the-welsh-wildlife-centre/

The Welsh Wildlife Centre is a wildlife reserve covering Teifi Marshes, near Cilgerran on the Pembrokeshire/Ceredigion border, Wales. The site is located close to the Cardigan-Cilgerran Offshoot of the Pembrokeshire Coastal Path.

== History ==
The reserve was established in 1993, located a mile from Cardigan. The site won an award for its design upon opening. The main building is a wood and glass structure with a panoramic view across Cardigan and the River Teifi.

The site is owned and managed by Wildlife Trust of South & West Wales.

The reserve covers 264 acres (107 ha) of the Teifi Marshes Nature Reserve. It has been described as "one of the best wetland reserves in Wales" by the BBC, and is one of only a few sites in the UK where one can find resident water buffalo.

In September 2019 arsonists burnt down a Kingfisher Hide at a cost of £20,000 to the Wildlife Trust. On New Year's Day that year, the site was again attacked by vandals, who damaged a badger sculpture.

The site currently welcomes over 80,000 visitors per year.

== Habitats and species ==
The reserve includes a wide variety of habitats which include, pasture and wooded hedgerows, freshwater marsh, reedbeds, and tidal mud banks.

The reserve is home to a large number of birds. These have included sedge warblers, reed warblers, cetti's warblers, kingfishers, marsh harriers, and red kites. Also present are water voles, sika deer, otter, and a range of insects in the summer months including 17 different species of dragonfly.

== Facilities ==
The visitor centre includes the Glasshouse Cafe, a restaurant with a panoramic view of the marshes. The menu includes homemade and local food, cakes and ice cream. Within the visitor centre are male and female accessible toilets, a shop, display rooms, and conference facilities available for hire.

== Funding ==
In 2019 the Centre received a grant of £10,000 from the National Lottery Heritage Fund to improve the visitor centre and attract a larger and more diverse group of visitors.

In 2019 the Trust appealed to the public for donations following the September 2019 arson attack, stating it would require almost £20,000 to rebuild the Kingfisher Hide which had been destroyed by vandals. The site was again attacked on New Year's Day.

== Cycling and dog walking path ==
The Centre is a 10 minute drive (3.9 miles from the Cardigan end of the Pembrokeshire Coastal Path (which ends on St Dogmaels Road), or a 20 minute walk via the marshes path.
