= Dale Fort =

19th-century coastal fort in Wales

Coordinates: 51.70320°N 5.15202°W

- Dale, Pembrokeshire, Wales
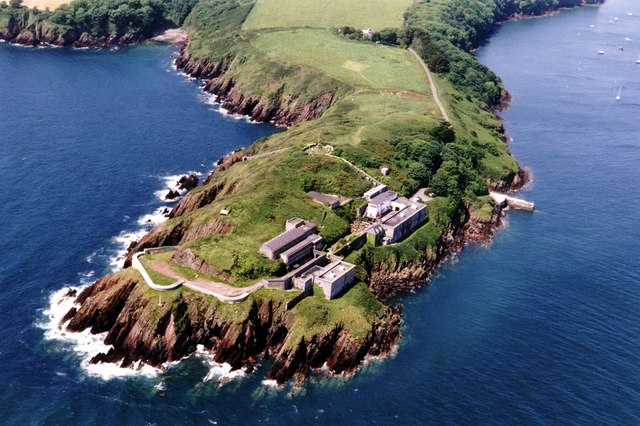
- Dale Fort study centre

Site information
- Open to the public: No
- Condition: Complete

Location

Site history
- Built: c 1851–56
- In use: Field studies centre
- Materials: Stone

Dale Fort is a mid-19th-century coastal artillery fort at Dale Head, a rocky promontory near Dale, Pembrokeshire, west of Milford Haven in Wales. It is one of the centres run by Field Studies Council and offers residential and non-residential fieldwork for schools, colleges and universities, holiday accommodation and professional and leisure courses in natural history and arts.

== History ==
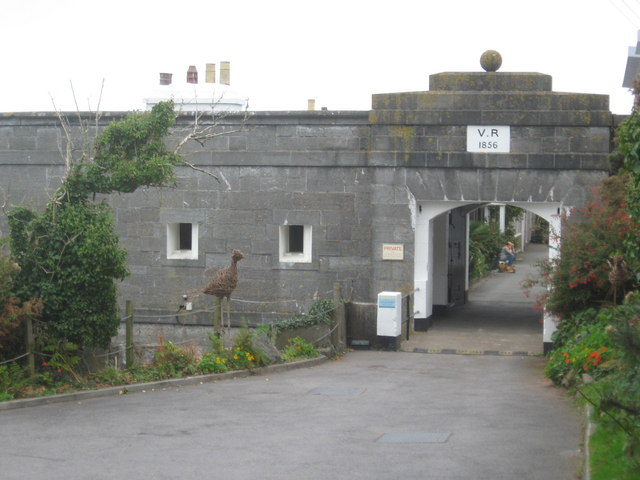
The main entrance to Dale Fort. The plaque reads "V.R. (Victoria Regina) 1856".

Although there was a proposal for an artillery battery on this site in 1829, the present fort is a result of a recommendation by Sir John Fox Burgoyne, the Inspector-General of Fortifications, in 1850. There is no record of when construction started, but the work was completed by 1858 and a date of 1856 is inscribed above the main gate. The fort was intended to protect the anchorage at the mouth of Milford Haven by providing interlocking fire with the nearby forts at Thorn Island and West Blockhouse. In 1876 there was a recommendation that the fort be re-armed with larger and more modern guns, but this was never implemented. The fort was the site for trials of Edmund Zalinski's Pneumatic Dynamite Gun in the 1890s, but the design was not adopted.

In 1902, the fort was sold to Lieutenant-Colonel A. Owen-Evans of the Royal Engineers, who converted it into a home for his family, but it changed hands when he died in 1925. During the Second World War, the fort was requisitioned by the Admiralty for use as a degaussing and mine-watching station, but was returned to the owner at the end of hostilities. The West Wales Field Society purchased Dale Fort for £6,000 in 1946 which it leased to the Council for the Promotion of Field Studies in August. The Wardens of Skokholm operated from Dale Fort initially. In 1959, it was sold to the Field Studies Council (formerly CPFS) at cost price plus an interest-free mortgage of £1,800 transferred to the Council. It has been run by the Field Studies Council as a field centre, and is now used by many thousands of students each year. 70% of the students are A-Level biologists working on the nearby shores to understand ecology.

== Description ==
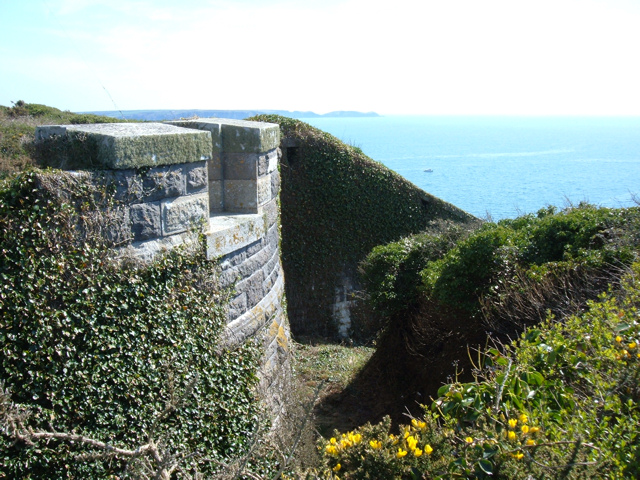
The bastion projecting into the ditch, which defends the landward approach to Dale Fort

The fort occupies the easternmost end of the promontory; it is protected by a ditch cut into the rock, which extends across the promontory and down to the shoreline on either side. The landward (western) side of the fort facing the ditch consists of a loopholed wall, in the centre of which is a D-shaped bastion with embrasures for three guns. In the northwest corner is a defensible building of three ranges. The central one facing the ditch consists of guardrooms, between which the main entrance of the fort passes in a passageway, having crossed the ditch by means of a bridge. The northern range is a barracks for the ordinary soldiers and the southern range contains various storerooms. Further along the northern edge is the officers' quarters and the main magazine, now with a modern accommodation building over it. The gun battery is at the eastern end of the fort on the cliffs overlooking the haven. There are seven positions intended for 68-pounder guns firing en barbette (i.e. on open mountings firing over a parapet), the southernmost four being on a higher level than the other three. Originally there was an expense magazine to support these positions, but it has been demolished. The site of the Dynamite Gun position is close to the present dining area, towards the north of the fort.
