= East and West Blockhouses =

Device Forts built by King Henry VIII

- Angle and Dale, Wales
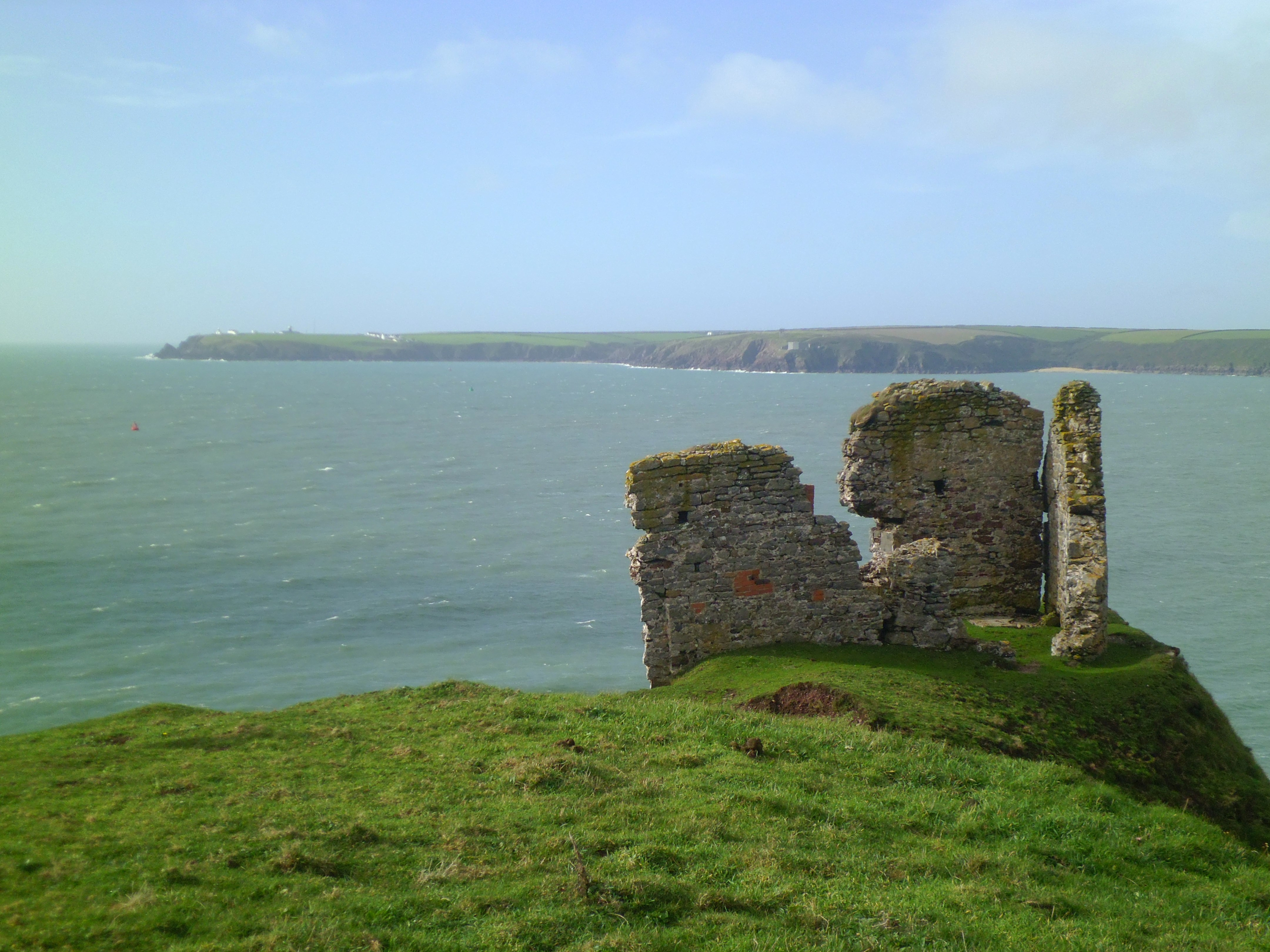
- Remains of the East Blockhouse, Angle, looking out to the site of the West Blockhouse at Dale

Site information
- Type: Device Fort
- Condition: East Blockhouse ruined West Blockhouse destroyed

Location
- The East Blockhouse site, shown within Wales
- Coordinates: 51.68213°N 5.12424°W

Site history
- Materials: Stone
- Events: Second World War

The East and West Blockhouses were Device Forts built by King Henry VIII in 1539 to protect the harbour of Milford Haven in Wales. The two blockhouses were positioned on either side of the Milford Haven Waterway in the villages of Angle and Dale respectively, overlooking the sea. The East Blockhouse was never completed, but the remains were reused as a defensive site in the Second World War. The West Blockhouse was described by contemporaries as forming a round tower with gunports, but it was demolished when West Blockhouse Fort was built on the same site in the 19th century.

== Background ==
The two blockhouses were built as a consequence of international tensions between England, France and the Holy Roman Empire in the final years of the reign of King Henry VIII. Traditionally the Crown had left coastal defences to the local lords and communities, only taking a modest role in building and maintaining fortifications, and with France and the Empire in conflict with one another, maritime raids were common but an actual invasion of England seemed unlikely. Modest defences, based around simple blockhouses and towers, existed in the south-west and along the Sussex coast, with a few more impressive works in the north of England, but in general the fortifications were very limited in scale.

In 1533, Henry broke with Pope Paul III to annul the long-standing marriage to his wife, Catherine of Aragon, and remarry. Catherine was the aunt of Charles V, the Holy Roman Emperor, and he took the annulment as a personal insult. This resulted in France and the Empire declaring an alliance against Henry in 1538, and the Pope encouraging the two countries to attack England. An invasion of England now appeared certain.

== Construction ==
Henry issued an order, called a "device", in 1539, giving instructions for the "defence of the realm in time of invasion" and the construction of forts along the English coastline. Soon afterwards work began on the East Blockhouse in the village of Angle. Angle overlooked the mouth of Milford Haven harbour in Pembrokeshire; another fortification, the West Blockhouse, was built just across the other side of the Milford Haven Waterway at Dale.

The East Blockhouse was constructed on a narrow headland 35 metres (115 ft) above the sea; the Elizabethan historian George Owen described the building as having been intended to be a "rounde turrett", and the physical remains in the 20th century comprised a 7.3 by 4.0 metres (24.0 by 13.1 ft) stone building, with a stone enclosure to the north and a subsidiary building 15 metres (49 ft) away from the main site on the south-east side. The construction work was never completed and by 1546 the walls had begun to collapse. According to Owen, the West Blockhouse was a round tower, 20 feet (6.1 m) in diameter, with eight gunports.

== Later use ==
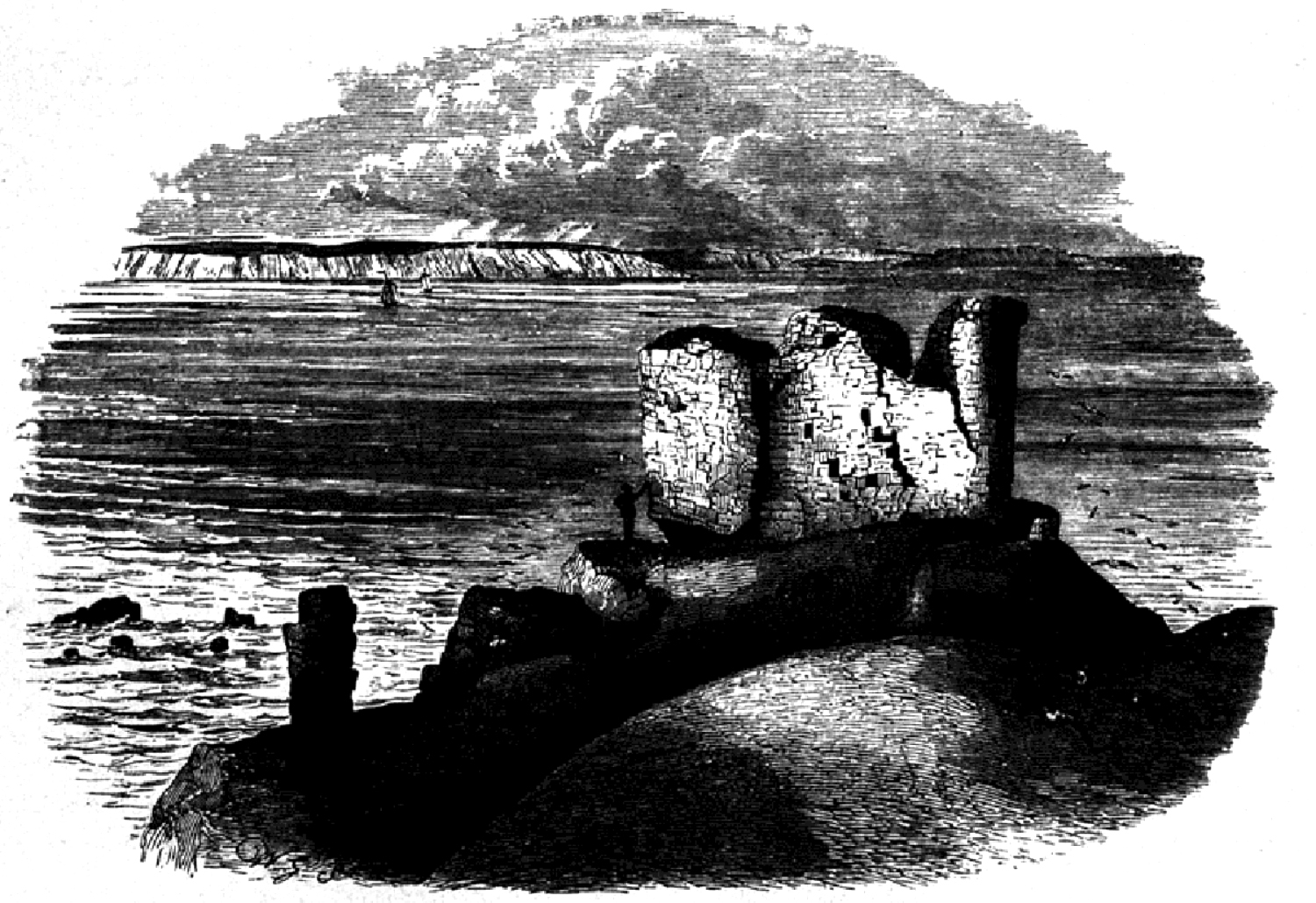
Ruins of the East Blockhouse in 1881

After peace was achieved with France in 1558, military attention shifted towards the Spanish threat to the increasingly prosperous south-west side of England. Tensions with Spain grew and invasion appeared likely in 1589, resulting in royal permission being given to reuse the stonework from the East Blockhouse for new coastal defences, but this work was not carried out. The fort continued to decay until the 20th century. With the outbreak of the Second World War in 1939, the East Blockhouse was adapted for use by the British military. The interior was cleared out and a shed was built in one corner. A slit trench was dug on the north side of the building, a rifle embrasure formed on the east side of the building, and a machine-gun position was dug out and protected with sandbags outside it.

Land erosion has damaged the East Blockhouse site; the north wall collapsed before 1975, and between 2010 and 2011 there was another major landslip. An archaeological survey of the blockhouse, funded by the Welsh heritage agency Cadw, took place in 2011. The East Blockhouse is the only such defensive structure to survive in Wales and is protected under UK law as a scheduled monument.

The West Blockhouse was demolished in the 19th century, when West Blockhouse Fort was built on the same site, and there are no visible remains.

== See also ==
- Castles in Great Britain and Ireland
- List of castles in England

== Bibliography ==
- Biddle, Martin; Hiller, Jonathon; Scott, Ian; Streeten, Anthony (2001). Henry VIII's Coastal Artillery Fort at Camber Castle, Rye, East Sussex: An Archaeological Structural and Historical Investigation. Oxford, UK: Oxbow Books. ISBN 0904220230.
- Crane, P. (2012). East Blockhouse, Angle: Archaeological Excavation, July 2011. Carmarthan, UK: Dyfed Archaeological Trust.
- Hale, J. R. (1983). Renaissance War Studies. London, UK: Hambledon Press. ISBN 0907628176.
- Harrington, Peter (2007). The Castles of Henry VIII. Oxford, UK: Osprey Publishing. ISBN 9781472803801.
- King, D. J. Cathcart (1991). The Castle in England and Wales: An Interpretative History. London, UK: Routledge Press. ISBN 9780415003506.
- Morley, B. M. (1976). Henry VIII and the Development of Coastal Defence. London, UK: Her Majesty's Stationery Office. ISBN 0116707771.
- Pattison, Paul (2009). Pendennis Castle and St Mawes Castle. London, UK: English Heritage. ISBN 9781850747239.
- Saunders, Andrew (1989). Fortress Britain: Artillery Fortifications in the British Isles and Ireland. Liphook, UK: Beaufort. ISBN 1855120003.
- Thompson, M. W. (1987). The Decline of the Castle. Cambridge, UK: Cambridge University Press. ISBN 1854226088.
- Walton, Steven A. (2010). "State Building Through Building for the State: Foreign and Domestic Expertise in Tudor Fortification". Osiris. 25 (1): 66–84. doi:10.1086/657263. S2CID 144384757.
