= Dale Castle =

13th-century castle in Wales

- Dale, Pembrokeshire, Wales.
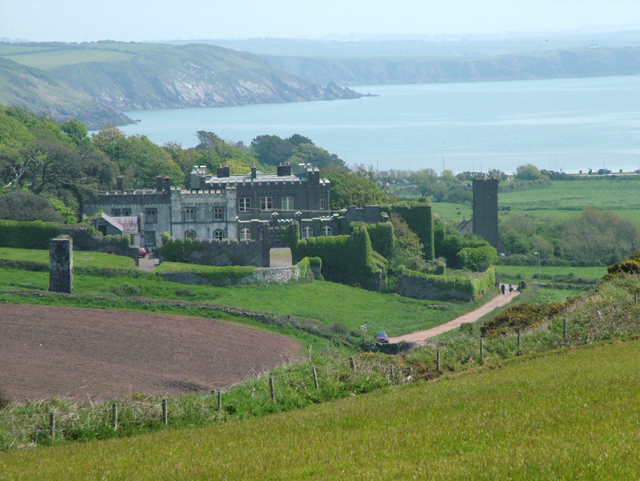
- Dale Castle and Church

Site information
- Type: Castle
- Owner: Ryder Family
- Condition: Rebuilt, Occupied

Location
- Coordinates: 51.7075°N 5.1774°W
- Height: Up to 10 metres (33 ft)

Site history
- Built: Second half, 12th century
- Built by: de Vales
- In use: Private
- Events: English Civil War

Dale Castle is a 13th-century castle located close to the village of Dale in Pembrokeshire, Wales. In 1910, part of the castle was removed and other parts were incorporated into a new private dwelling house, built in the style of a fortified manor house.

== History ==
Built after the Norman invasion of South Wales, the castle was originally built by the de Vales, descendants of a knight who had accompanied Robert fitz Martin on his invasion of north Pembrokeshire. The male line died out, meaning that subsequent owners have rotated through the female bloodline. The Walter family of Roch Castle took ownership, from whom Lucy Walter, mistress of King Charles II and mother of the Duke of Monmouth was descended. It was then owned by the families of the Paynters, Allens and Lloyds.

== The site ==
Little remains of the original medieval castle and what there is was largely remodelled and incorporated into the present modern house and farm in 1910. In an illustration dating from around 1810, a rectangular battlemented tower is visible with a range of buildings with a hipped roof running to the west. Another illustration, this time from the 1880s, shows these buildings to have had three storeys and the tower was still complete at the time. At the time of the remodelling in 1910, the tower seems to have been reduced in height and both the tower and buildings seem to have lost their roofs. The back wall of the buildings was removed and the front wall became part of the forecourt of the house.

The south wing of the current structure was the central block of the medieval castle, 19.5 metres (64 ft) east-north-east to west-south-west by 17 metres (56 ft), with walls 2.4 metres (7 ft 10 in) thick.

Owned now by the Lloyd Philipps family and their trusts, they have sold much of the remaining non-core estate land holdings, including the island of Skokholm. The castle is not open to the public.
