= Skokholm =

Small island in Wales

Coordinates: 51.69788°N 5.28047°W

Native name: Ynys Sgogwm
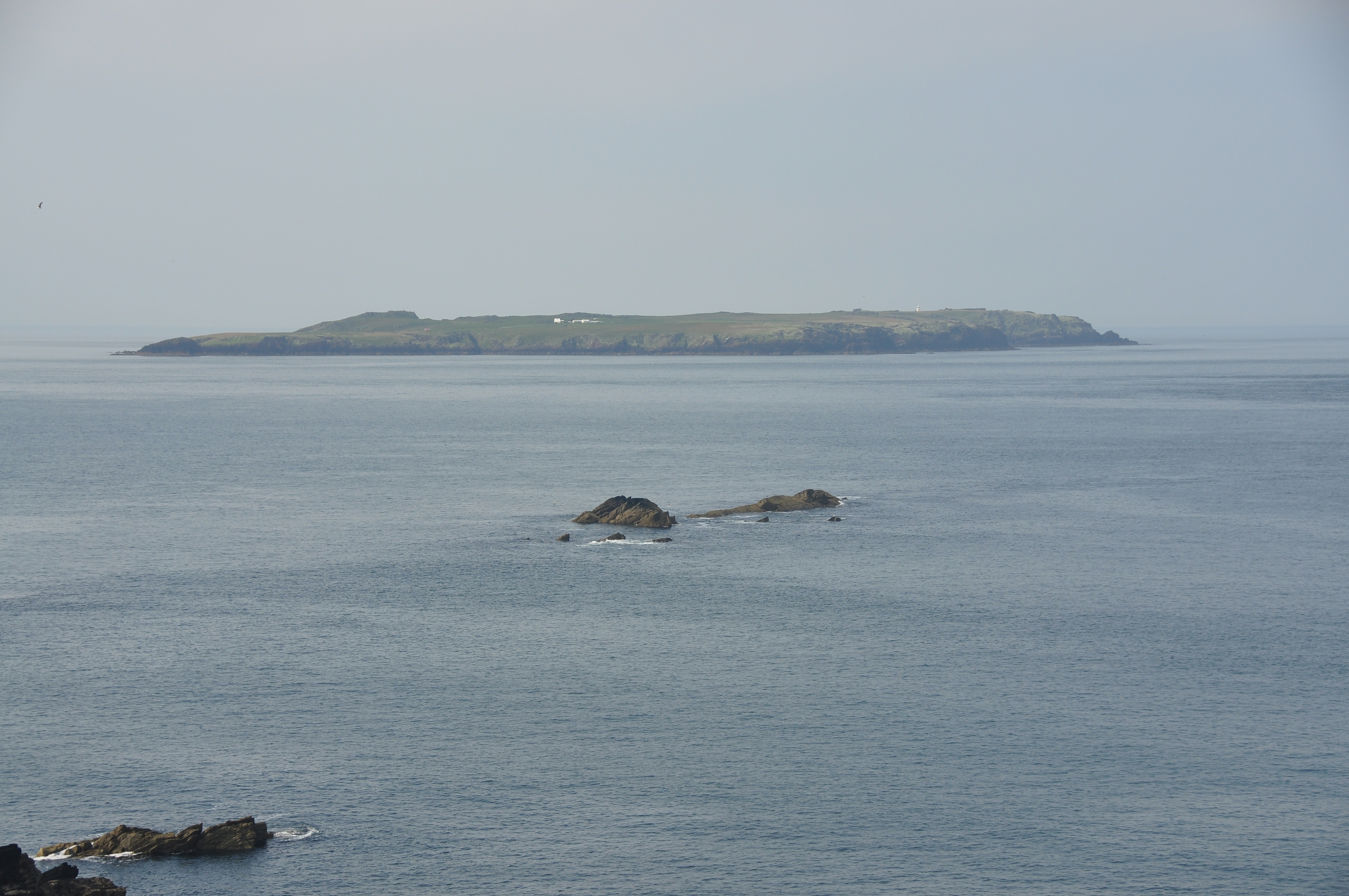
- Skokholm from the mainland of Wales

- Location within Wales

Geography
- Location: St George's Channel
- Area: 106 ha (260 acres)
- Length: 1.6 km (0.99 mi)
- Width: .8 km (0.5 mi)

Administration
- Wales
- County: Pembrokeshire
- Community: Dale

Demographics
- Population: 2

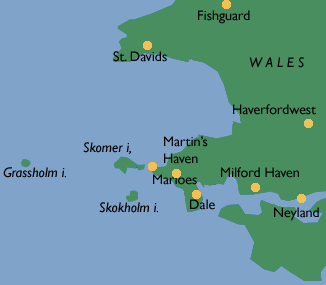
Skokholm and its neighbouring islands

Skokholm (Welsh: Ynys Sgogwm) or Skokholm Island is an island 2.5 miles (4.0 km) off the coast of Pembrokeshire, Wales, south of the neighbouring island of Skomer. The surrounding waters are a marine reserve and all are part of the Pembrokeshire Coast National Park. Both islands are listed as Sites of Special Scientific Interest.

== Geography ==
Skokholm is 1 by 0.5 miles (1.61 by 0.80 km), covering 106 ha (260 acres). Made up of Old Red Sandstone, its cliffs stand between 70 feet (21 m) in the northeast and 160 feet (49 m) in the southwest. Battered by storms, the high cliffs and isolated nature of the island make it a haven for seabirds. There is a rock outcrop close to the centre of the island, which provides shelter to the island's only structures. Its greatest height is 55 metres (180 ft).

== History ==
Whilst no trees grow on the island in modern times, Skokholm is possibly Norse for "wooded island", a combination of skógr (wood, modern Norwegian: skog) and holmr (small island, middle English holm and modern Scandinavian holme), named by the Vikings.

A published map from 1578 called Penbrok comitat by Christopher Saxton names the island as Sealine insul, and Angliae regni florentissimi nova descriptio, written by Matthias Quad and published in 1600, mentions the name of the island as Selome. Saxton also noted the small rocky island north of the main island as being 'Yardlan stone', perhaps a corruption of the Welsh words Yr Llan ("the church") or perhaps Yr Llanw ("the tide").

The island is likely to have been settled for several thousand years; evidence of stone-age occupation has been found.

There is an undated charter in the British Museum by which William Marshal the Younger, Earl of Pembroke 1219–31, grants to a certain Gilbert de Vale, land in Ireland in exchange for lands in Pembrokeshire, including the island of 'Scogholm'. The revenue from the island from 1324 to 1472 was recorded in Ministerial Accounts. Some years later, the island was in the hands of Sir John Perrott, supposedly a natural son of Henry VIII. It appears (in Latin) on a 1578 map of Pembrokeshire as Skokeholme Insul.

The island was bought for £300 in 1646 by William Philipps, a barrister, and it was kept in the family for the next 360 years. In 2005 his descendant Mrs. Osra Lloyd-Philipps (1920 – 24 March 2005) of Dale Castle died. The trustees of the estate decided to offer the island for sale, with first refusal going to the Wildlife Trust of South and West Wales, who had managed the island for the last 50 years on their behalf. After a large fundraising effort, the island was successfully purchased in April 2006 for £650,000, and designated a national nature reserve in December 2008.

== Bird observatory ==
In 1933, Skokholm started functioning as a bird observatory, the first in Britain, founded by Ronald Lockley; its prime function was the ringing of wild birds of resident, visiting, or migrating species and research. Lockley started the Pembrokeshire Bird Protection Society in 1938, now incorporated in the Wildlife Trust of South and West Wales. In 1948 the West Wales Field Society (WWFC), also now Wildlife Trust of South and West Wales, first took the Lease of Skokholm from the owners of the Dale Castle Estate. The WWFC followed on the Lease by Ronald Lockley which had run from 1927, but direct involvement commenced two years earlier when in 1946 the bird observatory was re-opened after the war. Ringing on Skokholm ceased from 1976. During the period of radar studies of migration around 1960, it became clear that bird movements as observed at the observatories were by no means representative of the whole and, inevitably, the significance of the observatories in the study of migration waned. Skokholm had been the site of the most thorough British studies of the European storm petrel and razorbill amongst the seabirds and the Eurasian oystercatcher and the northern wheatear amongst the landbirds. Said warden John Fursdon in 1946, "There can be few other islands anywhere in the world that can boast the continuity of biological recordings, save for wartime years, that has taken place on Skokholm." Skokholm Island was re-accredited as a bird observatory in 2014, with resident wardens Richard Brown and Giselle Eagle.

== Natural history ==
=== Geology ===
The island is composed entirely of mudstones and sandstones of late Silurian/early Devonian age assigned to the Milford Haven Group of the Lower Old Red Sandstone. This suite of rocks was formerly known as the Red Marls. The strata are folded into a syncline with an east–west axis; hence, the rocks on the north coast dip inland, to the south, at 25° to 40°, whilst those on the south coast also dip inland, to the north, even more steeply, at up to 80°. A couple of north–south-aligned faults affect the strata at the eastern end of the island, erosion along them being responsible for both Crab Bay and North Haven.

A couple of areas of till, a relict of the Irish Sea Icesheet from the last Ice Age, are smeared across the island's surface.

=== Flora ===
Most of Skokholm is simple sub-maritime grassland, with the wetter areas graded as heath and some salt marsh. All of these areas house common natural species including three-lobed water crowfoot, tree mallow, marsh St. John's wort, small nettle, and sea campion.

=== Fungi ===
Larger fungi were extensively studied in the 1940s and 1950s by Frederick Parker-Rhodes, who published a series of papers based on his research on the island. Skokholm is the type locality for the corticioid species Trechispora clanculare (Park.-Rhodes) K.H. Larss., described as new-to-science from the island where it was first found in a puffin burrow. Due to its isolated nature, Skokholm houses British nationally scarce lichens, including golden hair lichen (Teloschistes flavicans).

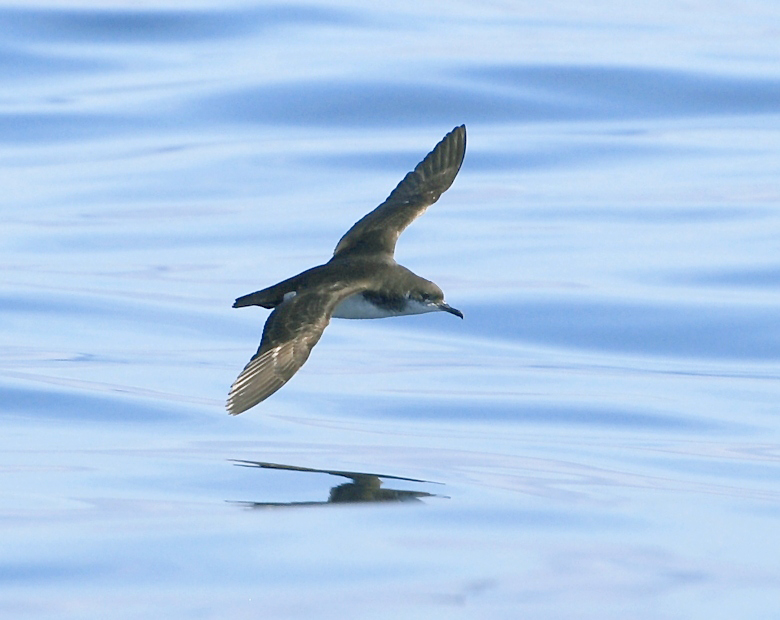
Manx shearwater

=== Bird life and larger fauna ===
Ronald Lockley, a pioneering ornithologist, especially famous for his work on puffins and shearwaters, wrote many books featuring Skokholm, where he lived and researched for many years.

Skokholm is home to the third-largest Manx shearwater colony (15% of world population), and 20% of Europe's population of European storm petrel, as well as (in 2008) 4,500 Atlantic puffins and 2,000 common guillemots and razorbills. A survey in 2016 found the population of puffins to be just under 7,000, and that of guillemots to be 4,000, the highest number since 1927. In 2021, the puffin population was in excess of 11,000, the highest since the 1940s. There are also large colonies of lesser black-backed gulls, herring gulls, and great black-backed gulls. The island is a breeding site for Eurasian oystercatchers, red-billed chough, Eurasian skylark, and northern wheatear.

Storm petrels recorded on Skokholm

In addition to the impressive numbers of breeding seabirds, it is a good UK site for passage migrants, including chiffchaff, willow warblers, common whitethroat, common redstart, and spotted and pied flycatchers.

After the Norman invasion of north Pembrokeshire led by Robert fitz Martin, the Normans built a rabbit farm on the island, later revived during the Victorian era. As a result, the island houses an example of long-term rabbit-maintained grass. House mice were accidentally introduced in the late 19th century.

== Buildings ==
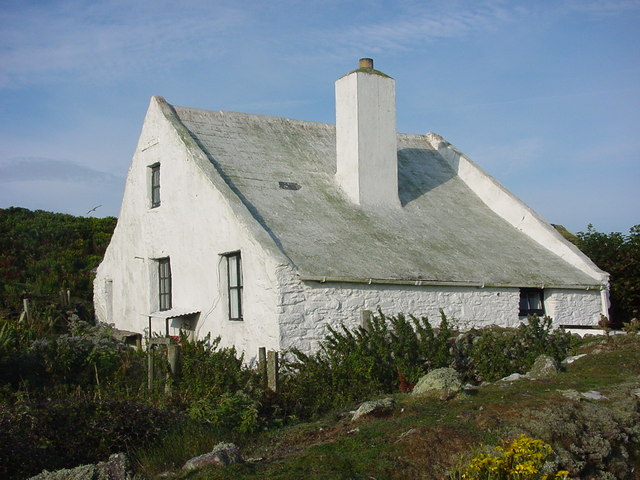
Lockley House, the UK's first bird observatory, rebuilt and lived in by naturalist Ronald Lockley

The first Skokholm Lighthouse was built in 1776, and then rebuilt at its present site in 1861. The lighthouse forms a triangle of protection into Milford Haven along with the lighthouses at South Bishop and the Smalls. Automated in 1983, it is now monitored and controlled from the Trinity House Operations Control Centre at Harwich in Essex. The farm cottage restored by Lockley is a grade II listed building, and the surrounding farm buildings have been converted to accommodation units.

== Transport ==
Connecting boats leave from Martin's Haven, with booked visitors able to stay on this island in basic accommodation. In 2010, the trust announced improvements to the island's landing jetty to allow easier access, with a £38,250 development project funded by Crown Estates and RWE Npower.
