= Geology of Pembrokeshire =

Overview of geology in Pembrokeshire, UK

The geology of Pembrokeshire in Wales inevitably includes the geology of the Pembrokeshire Coast National Park which extends around the larger part of the county's coastline and where the majority of rock outcrops are to be seen. The park was established as a national park in 1952. Pembrokeshire's bedrock geology is largely formed from a sequence of sedimentary and igneous rocks originating during the late Precambrian (Neoproterozoic era) and the Palaeozoic era, namely the Ediacaran, Cambrian, Ordovician, Silurian, Devonian and Carboniferous periods, i.e. between 635 and 299 Ma (million years ago). The older rocks in the north of the county display patterns of faulting and folding associated with the Caledonian Orogeny. On the other hand, the late Palaeozoic rocks to the south owe their fold patterns and deformation to the later Variscan Orogeny.

== Ediacaran ==
A series of late Precambrian rocks which occur around the St Davids peninsula and reaching east almost to Wolf's Castle together with Ramsey Island are assigned to the Pebidian Volcanic Complex or Pebidian Supergroup.

Further south are the diorites, granites and granodiorites of the Johnston Intrusive Complex and the rhyolites of the Benton Volcanic Group which stretch from just northwest of Benton Castle west-northwestwards via Sardis and Johnston in a broken chain to the coast north of Talbenny and include Stack Rocks offshore.

A quarry at Rhydaston works the tuffs of the Ramsey Sound Group whilst another at Boltonhill works the Johnston intrusives.

== Cambrian ==
A series of outcrops of sedimentary rocks from the Early (539-509 Ma), Middle (509-497 Ma) and Late Cambrian (497-485 Ma) are found in the northeast of the county. Unconformably overlying the rocks of the Pebidian, the following sequence has been established (youngest/uppermost at top):

- Lingula Flags
- Menevian Group
- Solva Group
- Caerfai Group
  - Caerbwdy Sandstone
  - Caerfai Bay Shales
  - St Non's Sandstone

These strata are well-displayed in the coastal cliffs at St Justinian's and between Porthllisky and Newgale though exposures inland are less frequent. The Lingula Flags are encountered intermittently along the north coast between Porthgain and Pwlldawnau to the northwest of St Nicholas.

== Ordovician ==
The various tors scattered about the northwest of the St Davids peninsula such as Carn Llidi, Carn Trelwyd and Penberry are formed of microgabbro intruded into mudstones during the Ordovician period. There are numerous intrusions of dolerite into the Aber Mawr Shales of Mynydd Preseli. That exposed at Carn Goedog has been considered as a source of the 'bluestones' of Stonehenge.

== Silurian ==
Rocks dating from each of the four epochs of the Silurian period (444-419 Ma) can be found in Pembrokeshire.

=== Llandovery ===
Strata dating from the Llandovery Epoch (444-433 Ma) outcrop through the middle of the county. These include the sandstones, mudstones and conglomerates of the Rosemarket Formation which extend west-northwest from Rosemarket. An outcrop including the Portfield, Haverford Mudstone and Gasworks Sandstone formations extends east-west beneath Haverfordwest and out to Narberth.

The Skomer Volcanic Group comprises a succession of extrusive igneous rock dating from the Aeronian stage of the Llandovery. These form the island of Skomer and the northern half of the nearby Marloes peninsula.

=== Wenlock ===
The Wenlockian age (433-427 Ma) shales, mudstones and limestones of the Coralliferous Group occur south of St Ishmaels and to the south and west of Marloes. These are overlain by the sandstones and mudstones of the Gray Sandstone Group which outcrop at St Ishmaels and north of Dale along to the Marloes peninsula. A further band occurs as an inlier to the north of St Ishmaels and Marloes.

=== Ludlow ===
Ludlovian (427-423 Ma) sandstones extend in a narrow outcrop between Freshwater East and Broomhill Burrows.

=== Pridoli sequence ===
Strata of latest Silurian age (Pridoli epoch, 423-419 Ma) form the lowermost units of the Old Red Sandstone which is otherwise Devonian in age. Assigned to the Milford Haven Group, these mudstones and siltstones interbedded with some sandstones underlie the Milford Haven area, extending west to the coast around St Brides and forming the Dale peninsula and the island of Skokholm. To the south they form a band of higher ground from Rat Island at the mouth of Milford Haven waterway, east-southeast via Hundleton to Old Castle Head near Manorbier. A further band extends from Freshwater West via Cheriton Stackpole to Greenala Point and Trwent Point in the east. Pridolian rocks form the southern half of Caldey Island. Another area extends west from Tavernspite to Minwear.

== Devonian ==
Lying stratigraphically above the Pridolian age strata are those units of the Old Red Sandstone laid down during the Devonian period (419-359 Ma). They include the:

- Skrinkle Sandstone Formation (part of the Brecon Beacons Group)
- Ridgeway Conglomerate Formation (part of the Milford Haven Group/sub-group)

A band runs westwards from Penally to Pembroke Dock and interruptedly to North Hill at Angle. A second band runs parallel to it to the south from Manorbier towards Rhoscrowther and then along the southern shore of Angle Bay. It extends across the southern part of Caldey Island. A major calcrete exposed in the cliffs at the southern tip of the island is named the Chapel Point Limestone Member. Another broader area extends either side of the Daugleddau and underlies Cosheston, Lawrenny Quay, Burton and Houghton.

The Old Red Sandstone sequences differ to the north and south of the Ritec Fault.

== Carboniferous ==
The Carboniferous system (equating to 359-299 Ma) is represented by four broadly parallel outcrops of the Carboniferous Limestone in the south and southeast of the county, between the more northerly two of which are outcrops of the Marros Group strata and the lower and middle Coal Measures, extending west to the shores of St Brides Bay.

=== Carboniferous Limestone ===
The most extensive outcrop of the limestone is in the southernmost part of the county where it forms almost continuous coastal cliffs between Stackpole Quay and the south end of Frainslake Sands. Several well-known natural features have been formed by erosion along this coast including the deep chasm of Huntsman's Leap, Elegug Stacks and the Green Bridge of Wales, a natural rock arch. Also of note is the rocky inlet of Hobbyhorse Bay. It has given its name indirectly to a slice of Carboniferous time, the Arundian, ‘arundo' being Latin for hobbyhorse.

The sequence in Pembrokeshire is (youngest/uppermost first):

- Pembroke Limestone Group (within which are contained the Black Rock Subgroup and Gully Oolite Formation which have been separately mapped locally by the British Geological Survey)
- Avon Group.

To the north a band of limestone stretches from the headlands of Lydstep Point and Giltar Point west to Pembroke. It extends from the estuary of Pembroke River west via Rhoscrowther to Angle Bay and again from the village of Angle to West Angle Bay. Offshore, the northern half of Caldey Island is an extension of this band.

A further band extends from St Catherine's Island at Tenby west to Pembroke Dock with an arm extending northwest from Carew to West Williamston and beyond. This band and the one to the south form tracts of low-lying land between east-west ridges of Old Red Sandstone.

The last and most northerly of these bands extends from Gilman Point just east of the county and national park boundary; initially averaging 0.5km in width, it extends via Ludchurch to Templeton beyond which it narrows, finally dying out south of Haverfordwest.

=== Marros Group ===
The sandstones and mudstones which make up the Marros Group of south Wales were traditionally known as the Millstone Grit Series. Overlying the limestone, the group comprises three formations, firstly the Twrch Sandstone which is overlain by the Bishopston Mudstone and capped off by the Telpyn Point Sandstone. These strata extend in a band of country from Ragwen Point west-northwest via Marros Mountain (the locality of Marros, after which the sequence is named, is just in Carmarthenshire to the east of the national park) to Picton Park on the Eastern Cleddau and then west and northwest to reach St Brides Bay at Haroldston West. A further band extends from the northern edge of Tenby towards Redberth and via a narrowing outcrop to Llangwm on the western side of the Daugleddau.

=== Coal Measures ===
The Coal Measures extend from Carmarthen Bay to St Brides Bay, forming the Pembrokeshire Coalfield, the westernmost expression of the South Wales Coalfield syncline. In the east, these strata are seen in sea cliffs and outcrops along the shore between Amroth and Waterwynch south of Monkstone Point. In the west, they are seen in the cliffs around Little Haven and Broad Haven. They are present too in the Newgale area but generally obscured by superficial deposits.

=== Pennant Sandstone ===
A fault-bounded block of sandstones, mudstones and siltstones of the Pennant Sandstone Formation occurs around Nolton Haven. These are assigned to the Warwickshire Group.

== Younger rocks ==
There are no post-Carboniferous rocks known within Pembrokeshire though Permian, Triassic and Jurassic strata are known from offshore. It is possible that the entire area lay beneath sea level during Cretaceous times but any evidence of chalk strata from that period has since disappeared.

== Geology of the islands ==
The geology of Ramsey Island is complex and comprises a mix of late Cambrian and Ordovician igneous and sedimentary rocks which have traditionally been assigned different names from their mainland counterparts. Skomer and Midland Isle together with the distant Grassholm and the Smalls are formed from extrusive igneous rocks collectively referred to as the Skomer Volcanic Group (formerly ‘Series'). In contrast Skokholm is formed entirely of Old Red Sandstone.

The Bishops and Clerks are formed from intrusive igneous rocks of Palaeozoic age including gabbro (North Bishop and Carreg Rhoson), rhyolite (South Bishop) and microtonalite (Daufraich).

Caldey Island is formed from Devonian and Carboniferous sedimentary rocks.

== Structure ==
The Variscan Front defines the northern extent of significant deformation associated with the Variscan Orogeny and is usually drawn on an ESE-WNW alignment through St Brides Bay and Saundersfoot Bay.

Named faults within North Pembrokeshire include the Strumble Head, Newport Sands, Aber Richard, Bronnant, Ogof Cadno, Ceibwr Bay and Penffordd faults all of which have east-west through to ENE-WSW alignments.

In the south are the Ritec and Benton faults which, along with various fold axes affecting the late Palaeozoic succession, have an east-west to ESE-WSW alignment.

== Quaternary ==
Successive glaciations took place within the Quaternary and each one affected Pembrokeshire. Mynydd Preseli did not generate its own icefield but the county was subjected to Irish Sea ice moving southeastwards. There is evidence for glacial lakes in the northeast around the flanks of the Preseli Hills and in the Teifi valley. A major system of glacial meltwater channels extends around the coastal zone between the Teifi estuary and Fishguard, north of the Preseli Hills. Earlier interpretations of these channels as the outflows from glacial lakes have been discarded in favour of a subglacial origin. Of particular note are the Cwm yr Eglwys channel, the Gwaun valley and Esgyrn Bottom.

=== Head ===
Head deposits are widespread across the slopes of the Preseli Hills. Elsewhere narrow strips of head occupy the floors of valleys in the northeast of the county.

=== Tidal flat deposits ===
Tidal flats formed from sand, silt and clay are common within the inner reaches of the Cleddau.

=== Marine beach deposits ===
Beaches and shingle bars occur around the back of St Brides Bay.

== Economic geology ==
=== Building stone ===
A quarry at Goodwick produced around 16 million tonnes of rhyolite between 1899 and 1906 for use in the construction of the breakwater at Fishguard. Solva Group sandstones were quarried in the C12th at Caer Bwdy for decorative work in nearby St Davids Cathedral. Slate quarries at Clogeu, Gilfach and Rosebush provided slabs for general building purposes. Locally sourced limestone has been used in the construction of the castles at Carew, Manorbier and Pembroke. Significant coastal limestone quarries were also active at Lydstep and Caldey. Slate was quarried at Caersalem Quarry at Porthgain and exported via the village harbour. Many older buildings and field walls have been constructed from locally sourced stone from riverbeds and hillsides.

=== Crushed rock ===
Though marketed as 'granite', it was an intrusion of dolerite of Ordovician age which was also formerly worked at Jerusalem Quarry, Porthgain and the legacy of that extraction and of the locally sourced slate and their export from the harbour prior to 1931 is now a visitor attraction.

=== Coal ===
Coal was formerly extracted on a small scale from contorted seams within the Pembrokeshire Coalfield.

== Conservation ==
Numerous sites and landscapes within Pembrokeshire are afforded statutory protection for their geological interest. These include SSSIs such as Esgyrn Bottom and RIGS such as Craig Rhos-y-felin in the Preseli Hills. The Pembrokeshire Coast National Park was designated in 1952 principally on account of its spectacular coastal scenery which reflects the diverse geology from which it has evolved. The cliffs, offshore islands and sea stacks (such as Elegug Stacks) provide innumerable nesting sites for seabirds.

== Recreation ==
The sea cliffs of the Pembrokeshire coast provide numerous venues for rock climbing, particularly on the Carboniferous Limestone in the south and the igneous rocks of the north coast. Coasteering is a sport which has grown popular around the coast of the National Park in recent years which makes use of the abundant coastal cliffs.
