= List of built-up areas in Wales by population =

Population density map in Wales from the 2011 census.

The following is a list of built-up areas in Wales by population according to the 2021 and 2011 Census.

== 2021 ==
This is a list of built-up areas as of the 2021 census.

=== Over 10,000 ===
Built-up area	Welsh name	Population
Cardiff	Caerdydd	348,535
Swansea	Abertawe	170,085
Newport	Casnewydd	130,890
Barry	Y Barri	56,605
Bridgend	Pen-y-bont	51,760
Cwmbran	Cwmbrân	47,090
Wrexham	Wrecsam	44,785
Llanelli	Llanelli	42,155
Neath	Castell-nedd	40,730
Merthyr Tydfil	Merthyr Tudful	39,535
Aberdare	Aberdâr	37,675
Caerphilly	Caerffili	33,105
Pontypridd	Pontypridd	31,900
Port Talbot	Port Talbot	31,555
Colwyn Bay	Bae Colwyn	29,275
Pontypool	Pont-y-pŵl	29,070
Penarth	Penarth	28,395
Rhyl	Y Rhyl	26,990
Ebbw Vale	Glynebwy	19,630
Maesteg	Maesteg	18,335
Tonypandy	Tonypandy	17,210
Bangor	Bangor	16,990
Connah's Quay	Cei Connah	16,770
Prestatyn	Prestatyn	16,675
Carmarthen	Caerfyrddin	16,455
Porthcawl	Porthcawl	15,795
Conwy	Conwy	15,715
Risca	Rhisga	15,195
Llandudno	Llandudno	14,710
Aberystwyth	Aberystwyth	14,640
Tredegar	Tredegar	14,530
Hawarden	Penarlâg	14,280
Milford Haven	Aberdaugleddau	14,250
Church Village	Pentre'r Eglwys	14,155
Gorseinon	Gorseinon	14,110
Pyle	Y Pîl	14,075
Abergavenny	Y Fenni	13,695
Buckley	Bwcle	13,560
Porth	Y Porth	13,350
Rhondda	Cwm Rhondda	13,265
Mountain Ash	Aberpennar	13,000
Rhosllanerchrugog	Rhosllanerchrugog	12,785
Flint	Y Fflint	12,780
Blackwood	Coed Duon	12,620
Haverfordwest	Hwlffordd	12,085
Chepstow	Cas-gwent	11,935
Sarn	Sarn	11,870
Ystrad Mynach	Ystrad Mynach	11,855
Holyhead	Caergybi	11,755
Tonyrefail	Tonyrefail	11,440
Newtown (Powys)	Y Drenewydd	10,885
Baglan	Baglan	10,510
Monmouth	Trefynwy	10,325
Abertillery	Abertyleri	10,245

=== Under 10,000 ===
Built-up area	Population
Mold	9,890
Caernarfon	9,835
Caldicot	9,815
Pembroke Dock	9,655
Pontllanfraith	9,360
Brynteg (Wrexham)	9,225
Pencoed	9,115
Kinmel Bay	9,020
Abergele	8,535
Clydach (Swansea)	8,445
Ammanford	8,285
Brecon	8,255
Llanharan and Brynna	8,105
Denbigh	8,075
Bargoed	8,035
Pembroke	7,965
Dinas Powys	7,890
Ystalyfera	7,830
Holywell (Flintshire)	7,735
Treorchy	7,650
Newbridge	7,585
Rogerstone	7,550
Abersychan	7,495
Gowerton	7,445
Beddau	7,350
Caerleon	7,330
Gwersyllt	7,110
Acrefair and Cefn Mawr	6,905
Rhoose	6,780
Broughton (Flintshire)	6,530
Pontarddulais	6,515
Shotton	6,500
Bedwas	6,460
Abercynon	6,375
Cross Hands and Pen-y-groes	6,340
Oakdale	6,130
Bagillt	5,945
Pontyclun	5,800
Undy and Magor	5,740
Ruthin	5,700
Abertridwr and Senghenydd	5,640
Blaenavon	5,640
Pontardawe	5,540
Welshpool	5,455
Llandrindod Wells	5,430
Treherbert	5,425
Llantwit Major	5,345
Llangefni	5,260
Brynmawr	5,250
Abercarn	5,125
Treharris	5,045
Rhymney	4,995
Burry Port	4,965
Gresford	4,945
Coedpoeth	4,740
Mynydd Isa	4,735
Llay	4,665
Loughor	4,630
Ynysybwl	4,580
Blaina	4,555
Nantyglo	4,545
Cwmafan (Cwmavon)	4,525
Hope (Flintshire)	4,420
Aberbargoed	4,415
Ferndale	4,300
Llangennech	4,280
Nelson (Caerphilly)	4,240
Llantrisant	4,200
Penrhyn Bay	4,200
Tenby	4,090
Tumble	4,040
Ystradgynlais	4,030
Chirk	3,935
Glynneath	3,925
Glanamman	3,865
Penyffordd	3,825
Rhuddlan	3,790
Penpedairheol	3,785
Troed-y-rhiw and Pentrebach	3,775
Cardigan	3,765
Llanbradach	3,765
Bethesda	3,755
Llanharry	3,750
Cowbridge	3,645
Pwllheli	3,620
Penllergaer	3,580
Taff's Well	3,555
Tylorstown and Pontygwaith	3,550
Llanfairfechan	3,545
Bishopston	3,535
St Asaph	3,485
Blaenau Ffestiniog	3,450
Fishguard	3,420
Ruabon	3,410
Eglwys Brewis	3,300
Talbot Green	3,290
New Tredegar	3,285
Neyland	3,250
Amlwch	3,150
Tywyn	3,135
Fleur-de-lis and Pengam	3,100
Ogmore Vale	3,100
Llangollen	3,050
Menai Bridge	3,045
Hendy and Fforest	2,995
Knighton	2,910
Langstone	2,910
Llanfairpwllgwyngyll	2,905
Aston (Flintshire)	2,845
Maerdy	2,840
Kidwelly	2,765
Penmaenmawr	2,760
Rhostyllen	2,760
Gwaun-Cae-Gurwen	2,745
Boverton	2,740
Alltwen	2,720
Tonna	2,665
Brynamman	2,635
Builth Wells	2,620
Dolgellau	2,600
Porthmadog	2,575
Llandybie	2,560
Rhos	2,560
Saundersfoot	2,515
Cwm	2,505
Lampeter	2,505
Tycroes	2,480
Llanrwst	2,465
Llanhilleth	2,450
Hendreforgan	2,445
Aberfan	2,430
Garden City	2,425
Pontycymer	2,425
Marshfield (Newport)	2,385
Nant-y-moel	2,375
Pentyrch	2,375
Narberth	2,365
Y Felinheli	2,330
Usk	2,310
Creigiau	2,300
Pen-y-fai	2,300
Bettws	2,240
Tanyfron	2,230
Merlin's Bridge	2,220
Llanidloes	2,200
Trimsaran	2,190
Gilwern	2,185
Cilfrew	2,180
Machynlleth	2,160
Resolven	2,160
Underwood	2,135
Crickhowell	2,110
Maesycwmmer	2,095
Pembrey	2,095
Benllech	2,075
Hay-on-Wye	2,065
Dyserth	2,040
Goodwick	2,020
Trelewis	2,020
Llanfoist	2,005
Valley	2,005
Meliden	2,000
Bala (Y Bala)	1,990
Barmouth	1,985
Machen	1,985
Rossett	1,975
Leeswood	1,950
Southgate	1,935
Presteigne	1,930
Whitland	1,905
Tongwynlais	1,845
Llanberis	1,840
Newcastle Emlyn	1,840
Rhayader	1,835
Pontlottyn	1,830
Northop Hall	1,825
Pentre Maelor	1,815
Penygroes	1,795
Rogiet	1,790
St Clears	1,790
Llandeilo	1,785
Blaengarw	1,780
Bodelwyddan	1,780
Johnston	1,770
Llanbadarn Fawr	1,765
Criccieth	1,735
Dunvant	1,730
Higher Kinnerton	1,730
Bryn (Carmarthenshire)	1,725
Swffryd	1,720
Trethomas	1,715
Sychdyn (Soughton)	1,695
Glan Conwy (Llansanffraid Glan Conwy)	1,665
Crynant	1,660
Penclawdd	1,655
Portskewett	1,625
St Athan	1,595
Llanrug	1,535
Gilfach Goch	1,530
Caerwent	1,525
Trinant	1,505
Pontyberem	1,485
Pont Rhyd-y-cyff	1,480
Pontyates	1,475
Three Crosses	1,475
Four Crosses (Powys)	1,465
Penrhyndeudraeth	1,460
Llandovery	1,455
Markham	1,445
Gelligaer	1,435
Abertysswg	1,425
Tir-y-berth and Glan-y-nant	1,410
Carway	1,400
Dwygyfylchi	1,400
Penperlleni	1,395
Trevor	1,395
Clwt-y-bont	1,385
Penrhyn-coch	1,380
Cefn Cribwr	1,375
Ogmore-by-Sea	1,355
Cwmfelinfach	1,350
Mynydd Marian	1,350
St Davids	1,350
Cwmllynfell and Ystradowen	1,345
Seven Sisters	1,345
Govilon	1,340
Pensarn	1,330
Llandysul	1,320
Bradley (Wrexham)	1,315
Pwll	1,305
Wooden	1,300
Croeserw	1,295
Nefyn	1,290
Gaerwen	1,280
Coedhirwaun	1,270
Harlech	1,260
Ponthir	1,260
Talgarth	1,255
Tregarth	1,255
Kilgetty	1,245
Bodedern	1,195
Llanybydder	1,180
Raglan	1,175
Penybanc	1,165
Guilsfield	1,160
Llannerch-y-medd	1,155
Grovesend	1,150
Capel Hendre	1,145
Fochriw	1,145
Wenvoe	1,130
Beaumaris	1,120
Llanfyllin	1,120
Borth	1,115
Wattstown	1,105
Bow Street	1,100
Bedlinog	1,095
Llanddulas	1,095
Bethel	1,090
Holt (Wrexham)	1,085
Pentre Halkyn	1,080
Aberporth	1,075
Cwmgwrach	1,070
Crundale	1,065
Pencader	1,060
New Quay	1,045
Aberaeron	1,040
Marchwiel	1,040
Llangynidr	1,035
Northop	1,030
Cemaes	1,025
Llangeinor	1,015
St Dogmaels	1,015
Llandegfan	1,000
Pont Henri	990
Ynysddu	990
Gronant	985
Cwmann	975
Cilgerran	970
Llanfair Caereinion	970
Montgomery	965
Crofty	960
Caerwys	955
Glyncorrwg	955
Treuddyn	950
Upper Killay	935
Trearddur	930
Trefnant	930
Waunfawr	930
Wick (Vale of Glamorgan)	925
Abermule	920
Gwernymynydd	920
Overton (Wrexham)	910
Saron (Llandybie)	910
Tircoed	910
Gwernaffield (Gwernaffield-y-Waun)	905
Llan Ffestiniog	905
Rachub	895
Mostyn	890
New Brighton	890
Craig-cefn-parc	885
Hook (Pembrokeshire)	885
Sageston	885
Llechryd	880
Tregaron	880
Ferryside	865
Tregynon	865
Broad Haven	855
Henllan	855
Llanbedrog	840
Llanddaniel Fab	840
Newborough (Isle of Anglesey)	840
Pen-y-ffordd	840
Castleton (Newport)	835
Letterston	835
Llannon (Carmarthenshire)	835
Cosheston	830
Glais	830
Groeslon	825
Pontrhydyfen	825
Abergwynfi	820
Bontnewydd	820
Llangwm	820
Llansantffraid-ym-Mechain	815
Nantgarw	815
Penally	810
Ystradowen	805
St Florence	800
Bwlchgwyn	795
Kerry	795
Pant-yr-Awel and Lewistown	790
Pwll-trap	790
Trelales	790
Forden	785
Rhosneigr	785
Bangor-on-Dee	780
Crymych	780
Pantymwyn	775
Templeton	765
Church Stoke	755
Clyro	755
St Brides Major	755
Dyffryn Ardudwy	740
Talysarn	740
Tremadog	735
Llanilar	730
Parc-Seymour	730
Penley	730
Abercraf (Abercrave)	725
Waungilwen	720
Dyffryn Cellwen	715
Bryn Du	710
Laugharne	710
Groes-faen	705
St. Arvans	705
Dwyran	700
Foelgastell	695
Flint Mountain	690
Garnant	690
Clynderwen (Clunderwen)	685
Fairbourne	680
Llanon	665
Minera	665
Brynsadler	655
Brynsiencyn	655
Solva	655
St Nicholas	655
Jameston	645
Lamphey	645
Tal-y-bont (Ceredigion)	645
Five Roads	640
Llanddona	640
Blackmill	630
Llangattock	630
Sudbrook	630
Trelogan	630
Lixwm	625
Rosemarket	625
Ystrad Aeron	625
Colwinston	620
Abersoch	615
Llanfechell	615
Cynwyd	610
Moelfre	605
Bryncrug	600
Froncysyllte	600
New Hedges and Twy Cross	600
Penysarn	600
Pontlliw	595
Efail Isaf	590
Deri	585
Bryn (Neath Port Talbot)	570
Caersws	570
Llangoed	570
Newport (Pembrokeshire)	565
Heol-y-Cyw	560
Llanwrtyd Wells	560
Bronllys	550
Rhostrehwfa	550
Rhosesmor	545
Aberdyfi (Aberdovey)	540
Llandinam	535
Nant-y-Patrick	530
Abergwili	525
Pentraeth	525
Brawdy	520
Rhydymwyn	520
Llwyngwril	515
Sennybridge	515
Cymmer	510
Ffairfach	510
Brynteg (Isle of Anglesey)	505
Ffynnongroew (Ffynnongroyw)	495
Dinas Cross	485
Llanarth (Ceredigion)	485
Penparc	485
Roch	485
Spittal (Pembrokeshire)	480
Argoed	475
Llandissilio	475
Morfa Bychan	475
Llandogo	470
Llangristiolus	470
Tal-y-bont (Gwynedd)	470
Hundleton	460
St Ishmaels	455
Ludchurch	450
Trefor	450
Bryngwran	445
Llanrhaeadr-ym-Mochnant	445
Glyn Ceiriog	435
Pentre Berw	435
Arddleen	430
Corntown	430
Corwen	430
Dolgarrog	430
Llangibby	425
Llangors	425
Morfa Nefyn	425
St Donats	425
Penrhyn-side	420
Bonvilston	415
Llanmaes	415
Blaenau and Cae'r-bryn	410
Llandevaud	410
Llansteffan	410
Reynoldston	410
Parc-llyn	405
South Cornelly	400
Cilcain	395
Broadstreet Common	390
Bryn Pydew	390
Catbrook	385
Gwalchmai	385
Caergeiliog	380
Norton (Powys)	375
Pontneddfechan	375
Talacre	370
Gwespyr	365
Rhosybol	365
The Narth	365
Bancffosfelen	360
Trefriw	360
Cribyn	355
Gorsedd	355
Llandre	355
Llanrhystud	355
Begelly	350
Llanllyfni	350
Peniel	350
Tallarn Green	350
Bwlch	345
Llangernyw	345
Crossgates (Powys)	340
Cwm-twrch Uchaf	340
Llanbedr	340
Tavernspite	335
Tintern	335
Llandygai	330
Clydach (Monmouthshire)	325
Simpson Cross	325
Waunllapria	325
Carmel	320
Mynydd-y-Garreg	320
Cenarth	315
Henfynyw	315
Trawsfynydd	315
Cross Inn	310
Llansannan	310
Pontrhydfendigaid	310
Rhostryfan	310
Three Cocks	310
Drefach	305
Llanwern	305
Betws yn Rhos	300
Whitehill (Pembrokeshire)	300
Bronwydd	295
Newbridge-on-Wye	295
Berriew	290
Bull Bay	290
Coelbren	290
Gwynfryn	290
St Fagans	290
Keeston	285
Manorbier	285
Shirenewton	285
Clawdd Poncen	280
Llanyre	280
Meidrim	280
Malltraeth	275
Waterston	275
Llanigon	265
Broadmoor	260
Hill Mountain	260
Capel Bangor	255
Llanfechain	255
Pentrecwrt	255
Caeathro	250
Freshwater East	250
Penisa'r Waun	235
Betws-y-Coed	215
Port Eynon	215
Pendine	170
Llanelwedd	130
Blaenannerch	125
Llandarcy	115

== 2011 ==
Rank	Built-up Area	Population (2011 Census)	Notes
1	Cardiff (built-up area)	447,287	Includes Caerphilly/Pontypridd/Penarth
2	Newport (built-up area)	306,844	Includes Cwmbran/Pontypool/Blackwood
3	Swansea (built-up area)	300,352	Includes Neath/Port Talbot/Pontardawe/Ystradgynlais
4	Wrexham (built-up area)	65,692	Includes Rhostyllen/Gwersyllt/Brymbo
5	Tonypandy	62,545	Includes Treorchy/Porth
6	Bridgend	58,380	Includes Wild Mill/Tondu/Sarn
7	Barry	54,673	Includes Sully
8	Llanelli	49,591	Includes Llangennech
9	Rhyl/Prestatyn (built-up area)	46,267	
10	Merthyr Tydfil	43,820	Includes Dowlais/Gellideg
11	Colwyn Bay	34,284	
12	Ebbw Vale/Brynmawr/Nantyglo	33,068	
13	Aberdare	31,135	
14	Flint	26,442	Includes Holywell/Bagillt
15	Rhosllanerchrugog	25,362	
16	Ammanford	23,709	
17	Church Village/Llantwit Fardre	23,277	
18	Maesteg	21,001	
19	Gorseinon	20,581	
20	Ystrad Mynach	19,204	
21	Aberystwyth	18,749	
22	Kinmel Bay/Abergele	18,705	
23	Bangor	17,988	
24	Connah's Quay	16,774	
25	Chepstow	16,169	
26	Carmarthen	15,854	
27	Porthcawl	15,672	
28	Llandudno	15,371	
29	Risca	14,958	
30	Tredegar	14,855	
31	Abergavenny	14,651	
32	Haverfordwest	14,596	
33	Llantrisant	14,422	
34	Llantwit Major	14,384	
35	Pyle	13,701	
36	Milford Haven	13,582	
37	Splott	13,261	
38	Treharris	12,352	
39	Bargoed	11,900	
40	Holyhead	11,431	
41	Newtown	11,357	
42	Mountain Ash	11,230	
43	Caldicot	11,200	
44	Bryn Pydew	11,109	
45	Llanrumney	11,060	
46	Abertillery	10,946	
47	Monmouth	10,110	
48	Mold	10,058	
49	Pembroke Dock	9,753	
50	Caernarfon	9,730	
51	Tonyrefail	9,317	
52	Pencoed	9,166	
53	Pontarddulais	9,073	
54	Llandaff	8,997	
55	Caerleon	8,747	
56	Rhymney	8,537	
57	Denbigh	8,514	
58	Burry Port	8,310	
59	Brecon	8,250	
60	Pembroke	7,552	
61	Ferndale	7,338	
62	Hirwaun	7,247	
63	Brynna	6,686	
64	Abertridwr	6,504	
65	Radyr	6,417	
66	Rhoose	6,160	
67	Abercynon	5,983	
68	Broughton	5,974	
69	Welshpool	5,948	
70	Undy	5,914	
71	Coedpoeth	5,723	
72	Gwaun-Cae-Gurwen/Brynamman	5,692	
73	Blaenavon	5,647	
74	Ogmore Vale/Nantymoel	5,461	
75	Ruthin	5,461	
76	Glyn-neath	5,419	
77	Cwmavon	5,336	
78	Llandrindod Wells	5,309	
79	Cardigan	5,301	
80	Gresford	5,010	
81	New Tredegar	4,966	
82	Menai Bridge	4,958	
83	Llangefni	4,864	
84	Bethesda	4,735	
85	Hope	4,706	
86	Tenby	4,696	
87	Llay	4,681	
88	Gilfach Goch	4,395	
89	Glanaman	4,384	
90	Pontycymer	4,288	
91	Pwllheli	4,076	
92	Glyncoch	4,020	
93	Conwy	3,873	
94	Cowbridge	3,804	
95	Llanbradach	3,746	
96	Rhuddlan	3,709	
97	Neyland	3,708	
98	Blaenau Ffestiniog	3,662	Does not include Tanygrisiau
99	Llanfairfechan	3,637	
100	Penyffordd	3,554	
101	Aberfan	3,547	
102	Ynysybwl	3,503	
103	Murton	3,500	
104	Llangollen	3,466	
105	Fishguard	3,419	
106	Saundersfoot	3,361	
107	St Asaph	3,355	
108	Llanrwst	3,323	
109	Amlwch	3,211	
110	Maerdy	3,160	
111	Llanfair Pwllgwyngyll	3,107	
112	Tywyn	3,097	
113	Marshfield	3,054	
114	Llanharry	3,035	
115	Llanhilleth	2,990	
116	Porthmadog	2,981	
117	Lampeter	2,970	
118	Llanidloes	2,929	
119	Usk	2,834	
120	Builth Wells	2,829	
121	Llandybie	2,813	
122	Kidwelly	2,782	
123	Cwm	2,739	
124	Talbot Green	2,734	
125	Dolgellau	2,688	
126	Llanddulas/Mynydd Marian	2,674	
127	St Clears	2,663	
128	Penmaenmawr	2,535	
129	Creigiau	2,380	
130	Machen	2,362	
131	Valley	2,361	
132	Cwmfelinfach/Ynysddu	2,342	
133	Barmouth	2,315	
134	Pentyrch	2,287	
135	Y Felinheli	2,284	
136	Leeswood	2,282	
137	Narberth	2,265	
138	Gilwern	2,263	
139	Benllech	2,236	
140	Bettws	2,253	
141	Machynlleth	2,235	
142	Seven Sisters	2,123	
143	Tanyfron	2,090	
144	Resolven	2,068	
145	Llandovery	2,065	
146	Crickhowell	2,063	
147	Southgate	2,004	
148	Underwood	1,976	
149	Bala	1,974	
150	Kilgetty	1,968	
151	Johnston	1,941	
152	Pen-clawdd	1,935	
153	Llanrug	1,916	
154	Newcastle Emlyn	1,883	
155	Llanberis	1,844	
156	Rhayader	1,824	
157	Rogiet	1,813	
158	Llandeilo	1,795	
159	Bodelwyddan	1,794	
160	Penygroes	1,793	
161	Harlech	1,762	
162	Criccieth	1,753	
163	Llansanffraid Glan Conwy	1,735	
164	Gwernaffield-y-Waun/Pantymwyn	1,734	
165	Goodwick	1,720	
166	Soughton	1,710	
167	Higher Kinnerton	1,697	
168	Pontyberem	1,695	
169	Aberporth	1,648	
170	Pontlliw	1,645	
171	Mostyn	1,606	
172	Crynant	1,602	
173	Trimsaran	1,584	
174	Three Crosses	1,583	
175	Bow Street	1,572	
176	Waunlwyd	1,556	
177	Gaerwen	1,551	
178	Penrhyndeudraeth	1,546	
179	Pen-twyn (Caerphilly)	1,540	
180	Talybont (Gwynedd)	1,540	
181	Trearddur	1,537	
182	Whitland	1,514	
183	Pont Rhyd-y-cyff, Llangynwyd	1,505	
184	Markham	1,495	
185	Llandysul	1,484	
186	Pontyates	1,449	
187	Govilon	1,447	
188	Four Crosses	1,438	
189	Aberaeron	1,422	
190	St Davids	1,408	
191	Cwmllynfell	1,405	
192	Deiniolen	1,379	
193	Nefyn	1,373	
194	Beaumaris	1,370	
195	Blaengwynfi	1,362	
196	Treuddyn	1,360	
197	Dwygyfylchi	1,355	
198	Waungilwen	1,338	
199	Cefn Cribwr	1,324	
200	Penrhyn-coch	1,316	
201	Penperlleni	1,311	
202	Tregarth	1,307	
203	Coedhirwaun	1,299	
204	Borth	1,269	
205	Talgarth	1,268	
206	Gronant	1,258	
207	Fochriw	1,250	
208	Letterston	1,245	
209	Guilsfield	1,220	
210	Llanybydder	1,218	
211	Tregaron	1,213	
212	Pentlepoir	1,211	
213	Caerwent	1,201	
214	Waunfawr	1,190	
215	Cemaes	1,187	
216	Raglan	1,183	
217	Bethel	1,171	
218	Wenvoe	1,155	
219	Gwernymynydd	1,141	
220	Llanerchymedd	1,133	
221	Grovesend	1,131	
222	Bedlinog	1,112	
223	Bangor-on-Dee	1,110	
224	Pencader	1,107	
225	Llanfyllin	1,105	
226	Glyncorrwg	1,096	
227	Pentre Halkyn	1,094	
228	Marchwiel	1,092	
229	Talysarn	1,086	
230	Llanilar	1,085	
231	Llanfair Caereinion	1,055	
232	Bodedern	1,051	
233	Trefechan	1,042	
234	Llangynidr	1,036	
235	Crofty	1,012	
236	Rhosneigr	1,008	
237	Deri	1,006	
238	Northop	1,001	
239	Trefnant	993	
240	Pont-henri	987	
241	Montgomery	986	
242	Llangeinor	973	
243	Overton-on-Dee	965	
244	Bontnewydd	951	
245	Caerwys	950	
246	Bryn	923	
247	Abermule	900	
248	Newborough	892	
249	Tregynon	892	
250	Argoed	891	
251	Tircoed	884	
252	Broad Haven	880	
253	Groeslon	880	
254	Ogmore-by-Sea	878	
255	Llangwm	875	
256	Llechryd	875	
257	Craig Cefn Parc	874	
258	Cwmann	872	
259	Llannon	869	
260	Cilgerran	865	
261	Llan Ffestiniog	864	
262	Henllan	862	
263	Morfa Nefyn	857	
264	Sageston	857	
265	Bwlchgwyn	855	
266	Newport (Pembrokeshire)	851	
267	Llangoed	849	
268	Penally	848	
269	Ferryside	846	
270	Hook (Pembrokeshire)	838	
271	New Brighton	838	
272	Pontrhydyfen	830	
273	Cosheston	828	
274	Laugharne	817	
275	Caersws	816	
276	Dinas Cross	815	
277	Trefor	814	
278	Glyn Ceiriog	804	
279	Kerry	785	
280	Abersoch	783	
281	Clyro	781	
282	Ewenny	768	
283	St Arvans	765	
284	Llanfihangel yn Nhowyn	757	
285	St Florence	756	
286	Pen-y-ffordd	748	
287	Llandyrnog	747	
288	Llansanffraid-ym-Mechain	747	
289	Forden	745	
290	Parc-Seymour	744	
291	St Brides Major	741	
292	Pant-yr-awel	734	
293	Maenclochog	731	
294	Carno	730	
295	Dyffryn Cellwen	727	
296	Aberdovey	725	
297	Fairbourne	721	
298	Rhigos	718	
299	Gwalchmai	715	
300	Waunllapria	714	
301	Pontrhydfendigaid	712	
302	Rhosybol	712	
303	Moelfre	710	
304	Solva	710	
305	Crymych	704	
306	Wick	698	
307	Abercrave	696	
308	New Quay	694	
309	Clydach	692	
310	Llanddona	691	
311	Groes-faen	685	
312	Llandre	679	
313	Clunderwen	677	
314	Rhostryfan	675	
315	Hill Mountain	673	
316	Carway	672	
317	Trelogan	671	
318	Flint Mountain	670	
319	Llangattock	662	
320	Tal-y-bont (Ceredigion)	662	
321	Mynydd-bach/Shirenewton	657	
322	Blackmill	654	
323	Llangadog	650	
324	Llanrhystud	646	
325	Chwilog	640	
326	Llanddewi Brefi	640	
327	Pwllmeyric	635	
328	Jameston	634	
329	Llanwrtyd Wells	630	
330	Trawsfynydd	628	
331	Templeton	627	
332	Bryncrug	622	
333	Brawdy	620	
334	Stepaside	619	
335	Llanbedrog	613	
336	Rosemarket	613	
337	Lixwm	610	
338	Cross Lanes	609	
339	Froncysyllte	606	
340	Penley	606	
341	Trefriw	605	
342	Dwyran	603	
343	Llanon	598	
344	Ystrad Aeron	596	
345	Penysarn	595	
346	Lamphey	593	
347	Abergwili	589	
348	Llanfechell	589	
349	Crundale	584	
350	Meidrim	582	
351	Llandinam	576	
352	Rhosesmor	575	
353	Newbridge-on-Wye	566	
354	Pentraeth	557	
355	St Donat's	555	
356	Llandogo	547	
357	Cynwyd	542	
358	Heol-y-Cyw	538	
359	Coelbren	537	
360	Rhydymwyn	537	
361	Mynytho	536	
362	Ffairfach	534	
363	Llwyngwril	526	
364	Morfa Bychan	526	
365	Nantgaredig	524	
366	Penrhiw-llan	521	
367	Llandissilio	513	
368	Henfynyw	512	
369	Llanrhidian	512	
370	Llanellen	506	
371	Llanarth	503	
372	Spittal	494	
373	Bronllys	491	
374	Cwrt y Gollen	487	
375	St Ishmael's	478	
376	Corwen	477	
377	South Cornelly	471	
378	Penparc	470	
379	Roch	463	
380	Dolgarrog	446	
381	Llangybi	444	
382	Reynoldston	439	
383	Hundleton	435	
384	Blaenau	425	
385	Llansteffan	424	
386	Arddleen	418	
387	St Nicholas	417	
388	Catbrook	412	
389	Llanrhaeadr-ym-Mochnant	408	
390	Bryngwran	405	
391	Bonvilston	392	
392	Hengell Uchaf Estate	388	
393	Llanbedr	385	
394	Llangristiolus	384	
395	Llandevaud	376	
396	Norton (Powys)	375	
397	Llangors	371	
398	The Narth	369	
399	Pontneddfechan	366	
400	Llanmadoc	365	
401	Pen-twyn (Monmouthshire)	358	
402	Peniel	358	
403	Caergeiliog	355	
404	Tavernspite	349	
405	Talacre	347	
406	Pendine	346	
407	Waterston	335	
408	Crossgates	327	
409	Keeston	324	
410	Sudbrook	322	
411	Clarbeston Road	318	
412	Meifod	317	
413	Betws-yn-Rhos	312	
414	Llanbedr-Dyffryn-Clwyd	306	
415	Pentre Maelor	305	
416	Crymlyn Burrows	303	
417	Gwynfryn	303	
418	Clawdd Poncen	300	
419	Mynyddygarreg	299	
420	Cross Inn	292	
421	Cerrigydrudion	289	
422	Bull Bay	287	
423	Llanwrda	287	
424	Berriew	283	
425	St Fagans	282	
426	Llanyre	279	
427	Rhossili	278	
428	Capel Bangor	256	
429	Betws-Y-Coed	255	
430	Malltraeth	255	
431	Freshwater East	250	
432	Pentre-cwrt	247	
433	Sennybridge	230	
434	Port Eynon	226	
435	Talybont-on-Usk	219	
436	Ynysmaerdy	205	
437	Blaenannerch	131	

== See also ==
- List of cities in Wales
- List of towns in Wales
- List of towns and cities in England by population
- List of towns and cities in Scotland by population
- List of settlements on the island of Ireland by population
