= Hill Mountain =

Village in Pembrokeshire, Wales

Coordinates: 51.73°N 4.94°W

- Location within Pembrokeshire
- Population: 673
- OS grid reference: SM970076
- Community: Burton
- Principal area: Pembrokeshire
- Country: Wales
- Sovereign state: United Kingdom
- Post town: Milford Haven
- Postcode district: SA73
- Police: Dyfed-Powys
- Fire: Mid and West Wales
- Ambulance: Welsh
- UK Parliament: Preseli Pembrokeshire
- Senedd Cymru – Welsh Parliament: Preseli Pembrokeshire

Hill Mountain (or Herson/Hearson Mountain) is a village in the community and parish (Church in Wales) of Burton, south Pembrokeshire, Wales. The population in 2011 was 673.

== Description ==
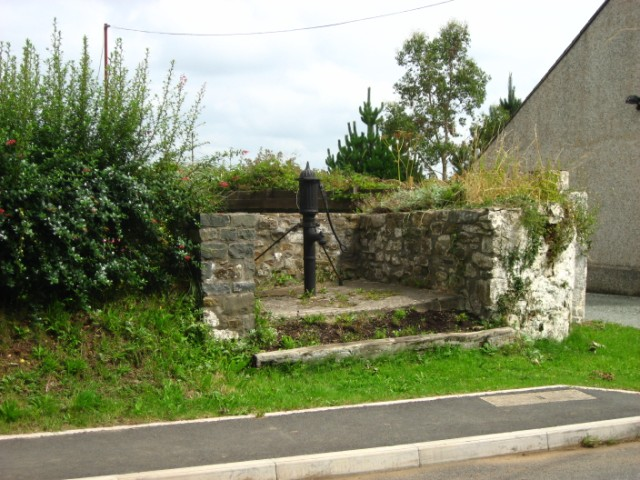
The pump at Hill Mountain

The village is a scattered settlement of largely modern properties strung out along several minor roads in the triangle between Sardis, Llangwm and Houghton. Most of the land around the village is enclosed farmland. The village has a cricket field and pavilion (listed as Houghton) where Burton Cricket Club play.

== History ==
While Hill Mountain existed as a settlement in the 19th century, there were fewer than ten properties. A pub, The Star, is marked on an early 20th century map but no longer exists.

=== Hearson Camp ===
To the south of Hill Mountain Hearson Camp was established in 1914 for 1st Battalion, the Welsh Regiment's training. The area was later returned to farmland. A scoping study of the site was carried out in 2014 by Dyfed Archaeological Trust to determine whether there was a case for archaeological study of this and other wartime sites in the county. The paper includes a contemporary War Office map of the village and sketch of the camp.

== Worship ==
Hill Mountain is in the parish (Church in Wales) of Burton.

The chapel in the village is Wesleyan Methodist, established in 1815.
