= Benton Volcanic Group =

Lithostratigraphic group in Wales

Group
- Stratigraphic range: Ediacaran
- Type: Group

Lithology
- Primary: lavas
- Other: tuffs

Location
- Region: West Wales
- Country: Wales
- Extent: Daugleddau west to Talbenny, Pembrokeshire

Type section
- Named for: Benton Castle

The Benton Volcanic Group is an Ediacaran lithostratigraphic group (a sequence of rock strata) in Pembrokeshire, Wales. The name is derived from the locality of Benton Castle in mid Pembrokeshire. It has previously been known as the Benton Volcanic Series or simply the Benton Series. They include lavas of trachytic and rhyolitic composition together with lesser amounts of red and green silicic tuffs and are found as apparently faulted blocks between the Daugleddau and west to Talbenny.
