= Abenbury =

Community in Wrexham County Borough, Wales

Coordinates: 53°01′59″N 2°56′12″W

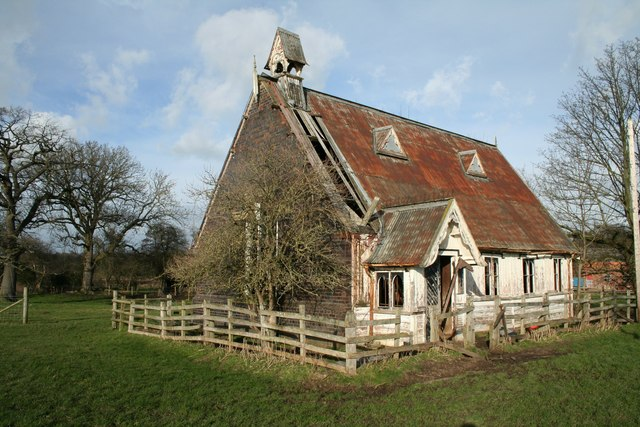
- A disused "tin tabernacle" near the village of Pentre Maelor.

- Location within Wrexham
- Population: 1,678 (2011 Census)
- OS grid reference: SJ3719448863
- Principal area: Wrexham
- Preserved county: Clwyd
- Country: Wales
- Sovereign state: United Kingdom
- Post town: WREXHAM
- Postcode district: LL13
- Police: North Wales
- Fire: North Wales
- Ambulance: Welsh
- UK Parliament: Wrexham
- Senedd Cymru – Welsh Parliament: Wrexham
- List of places UK Wales Wrexham Map of the community

Abenbury is a community in Wrexham County Borough, Wales. It is situated south-east of Wrexham city and includes the village of Pentre Maelor and part of the Wrexham Industrial Estate.

The ancient parish of Wrexham included the townships of Abenbury Fawr (or "Big Abenbury") and Abenbury Fechan (or "Little Abenbury"). The township of Abenbury Fechan was one of several exclaves of Flintshire and was only transferred to Denbighshire in 1884. The historian A. N. Palmer argued that the name Abenbury probably had a compound Welsh and English origin, noting there was a farm called "Coed Aben" in the township.

The civil parish of Abenbury was created in 1935 from parts of the old townships of Abenbury Fawr and Erlas: it was the basis of the community of Abenbury when this was created under the Local Government Act 1972.

At the 2001 census, the community had a population of 718 in 277 households, the population increasing to 1,678 at the 2011 Census. The majority of residents live in the village of Pentre Maelor, which was originally built in 1947 to house workers from nearby factories. The community also includes a large rural area and the Llwyn Onn estate on the outskirts of Wrexham, all of which are governed by Abenbury Community Council (Welsh: Cyngor Cymuned Abenbury).
