= Penyffordd =

Village and community in Flintshire, Wales

Penyffordd: Welsh: Pen-y-ffordd
- Village and community
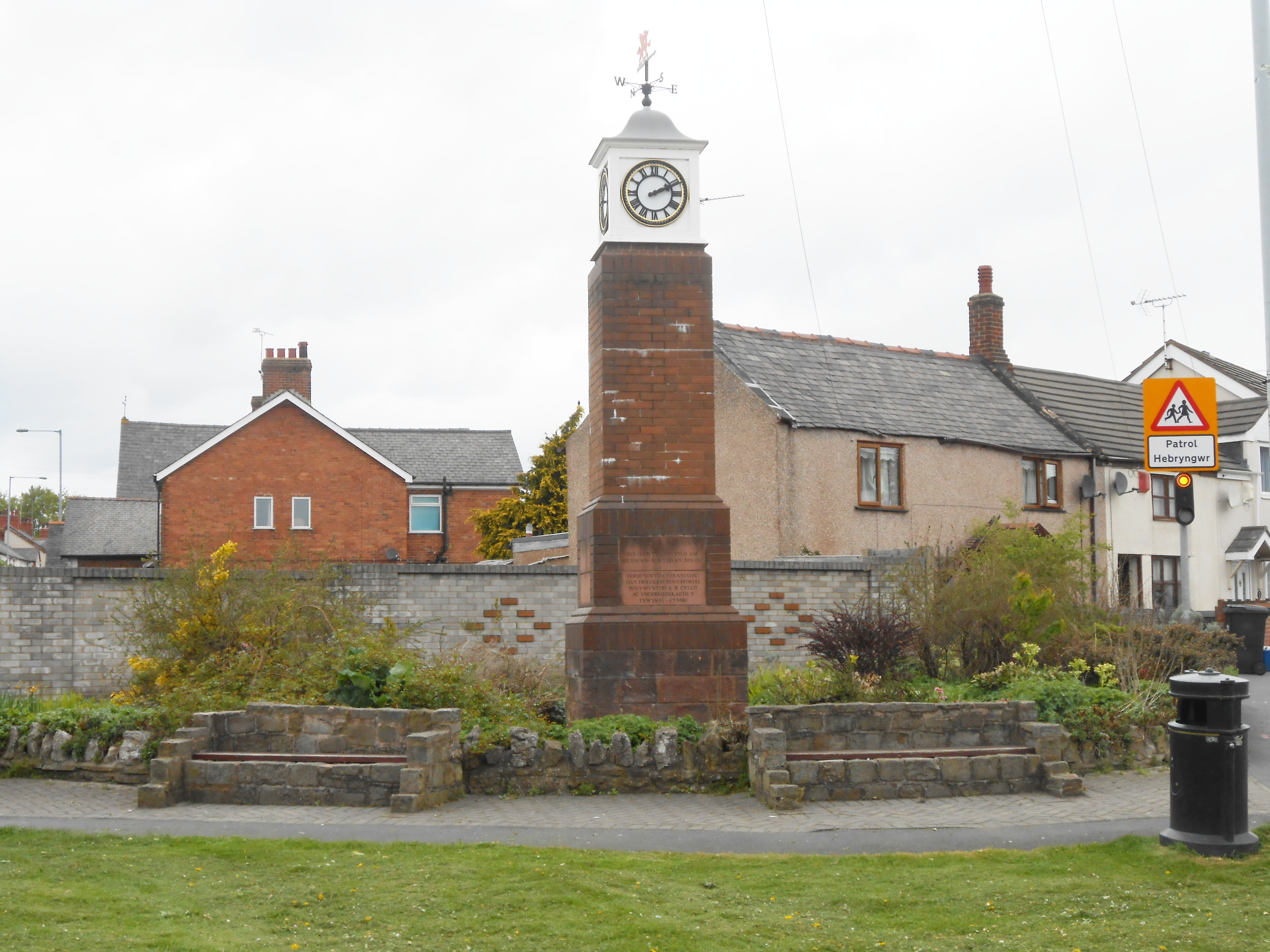
- Millennium Clock, Penyffordd

- Location within Flintshire
- Population: 3,874 (2011 Census)
- OS grid reference: SJ301617
- Community: Penyffordd
- Principal area: Flintshire
- Preserved county: Clwyd
- Country: Wales
- Sovereign state: United Kingdom
- Post town: Chester
- Postcode district: CH4
- Dialling code: 01244
- Police: North Wales
- Fire: North Wales
- Ambulance: Welsh
- UK Parliament: Alyn and Deeside
- Senedd Cymru – Welsh Parliament: Alyn and Deeside
- Website: penyfforddcouncil.org
- List of places UK Wales Flintshire 53.148°N 3.045°W Map of the community

Penyffordd, or Pen-y-ffordd, is a village, community and electoral ward in Flintshire, Wales, situated to the south east of Buckley and to the west of Chester. The name is derived from the Welsh Pen Y Ffordd – roughly translated as 'the highest or furthest point of the road'. The resident population of Penyffordd, as measured in the 2001 Census, was 3,715, increasing to 3,874 at the 2011 census.

Penyffordd lies to the east of A550, south of its junction with the A55 (North Wales Expressway). The ward consists of the neighbouring villages of Penyffordd and Penymynydd, which are a ribbon development along the line of the former major road. There is also a zebra crossing which has been instated.

A hamlet named Pen-y-ffordd is also in Flintshire. It is located between Holywell and Prestatyn, near Mostyn.

== History ==
Penyffordd was home to a Royal Observer Corps (ROC) monitoring post, built in 1958 and closed in 1968 due to the British Government deeming that the nuclear threat had lessened enough for the closure of many ROC bunkers.

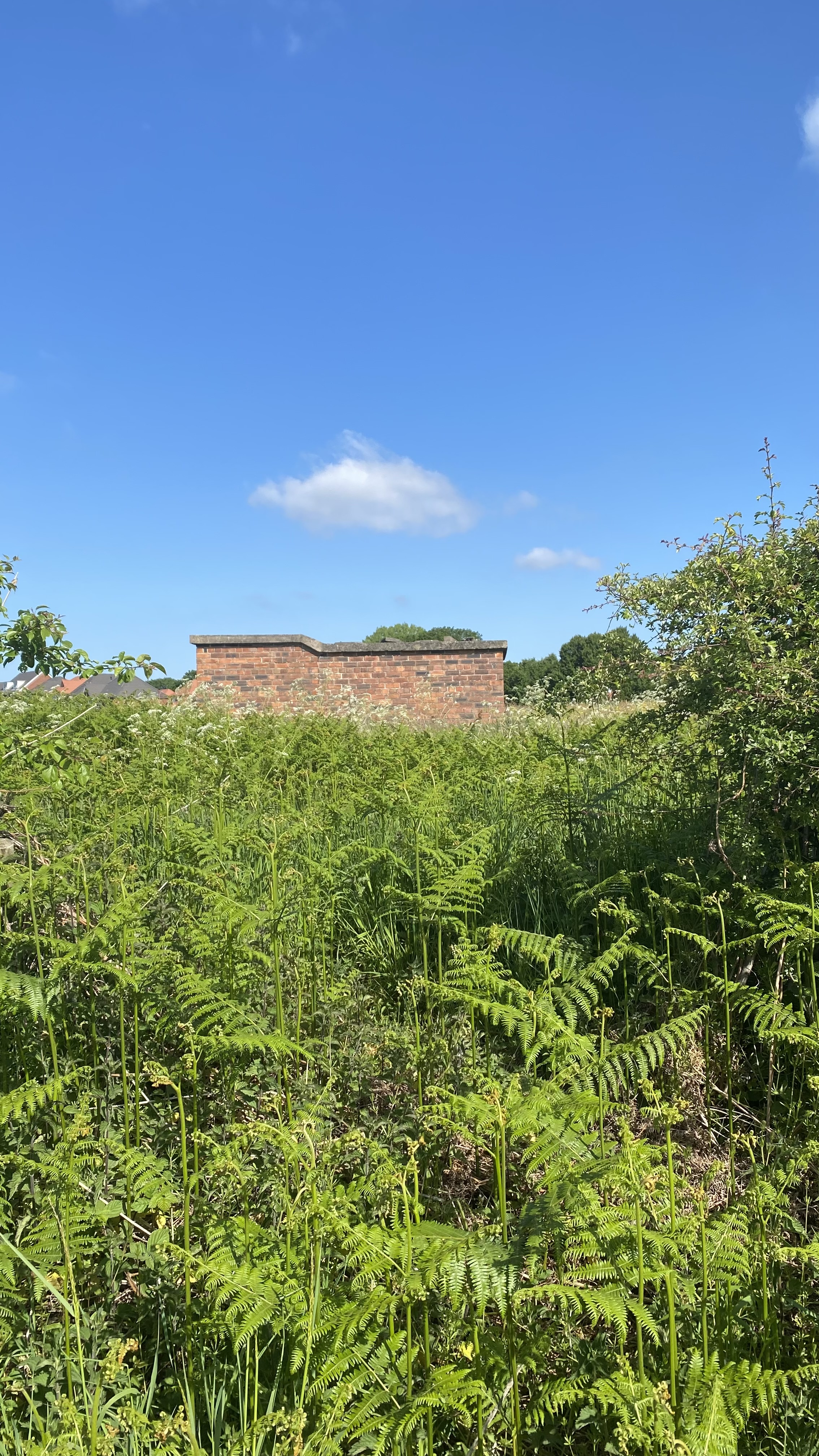
Abandoned RAF aircraft observation post at the site of the ROC bunker.

== Community ==
Local amenities and landmarks include a village hall and war memorial. Penyffordd has its own Village Institute, Scout group, Girl Guides group and local youth club. An annual children's competition called the Penyffordd and Penymynydd Youth Festival is held in the village.

Sport and leisure in the village include Pen-y-ffordd Tennis Club, a bowling green, and Penyffordd Dancing School. The village has two pubs, the Red Lion and the Millstone.

The village is served by Ysgol Penyffordd (comprising the former Penyffordd County Primary and Abbots Lane Infant schools) and St John the Baptist VA School in Penymynydd. The local secondary school is Castell Alun High School, which is in the nearby village of Hope.

Penyffordd has two places of worship: Trinity Chapel (Presbyterian & Methodist) and Emmanuel (Church in Wales).

Penyffordd railway station, on the Corwen road, is on the Borderlands Line from Wrexham to Bidston in Birkenhead.

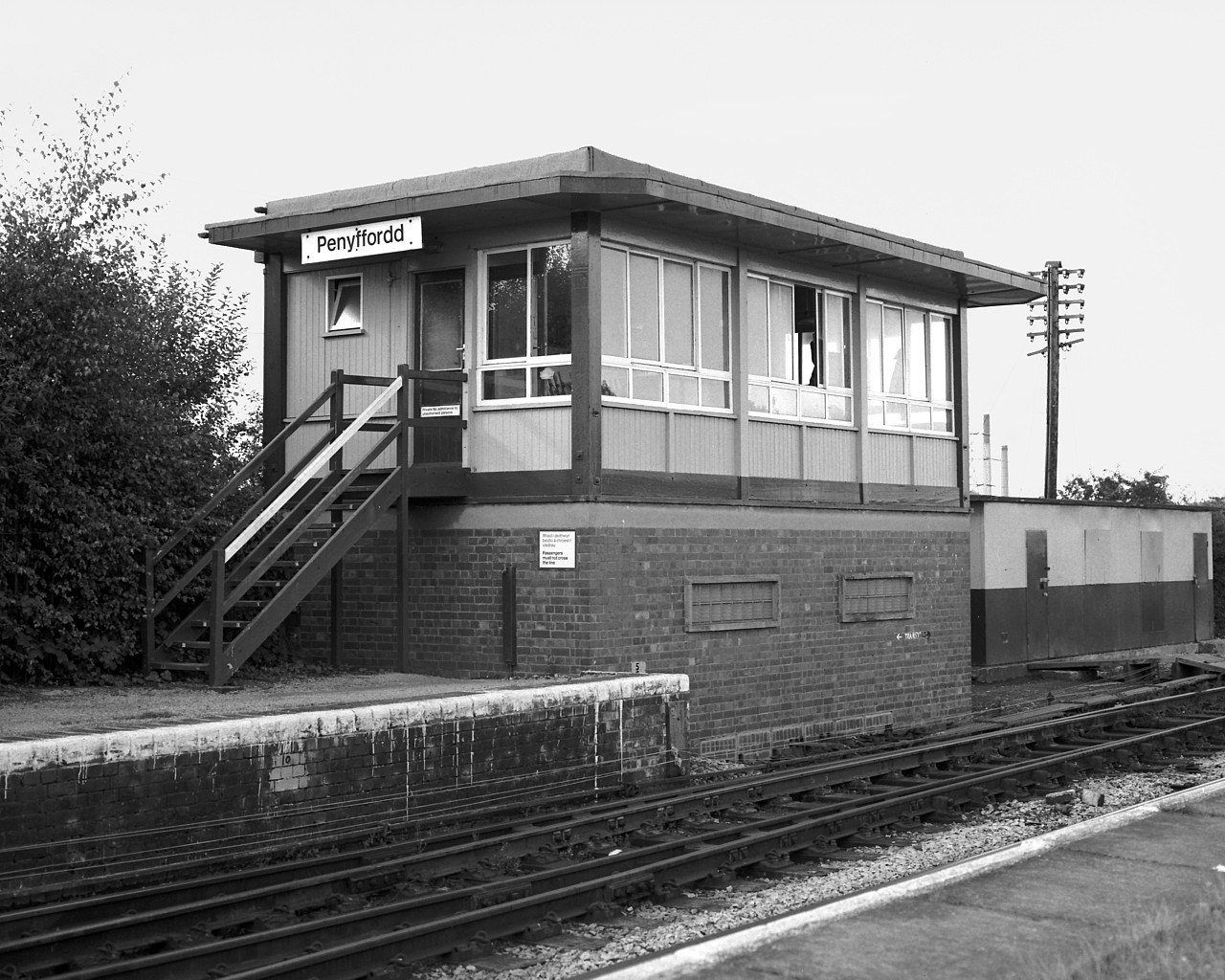
Penyffordd Station (1987)
