= Penymynydd =

Village in Flintshire, Wales

Coordinates: 53.155°N 3.040°W

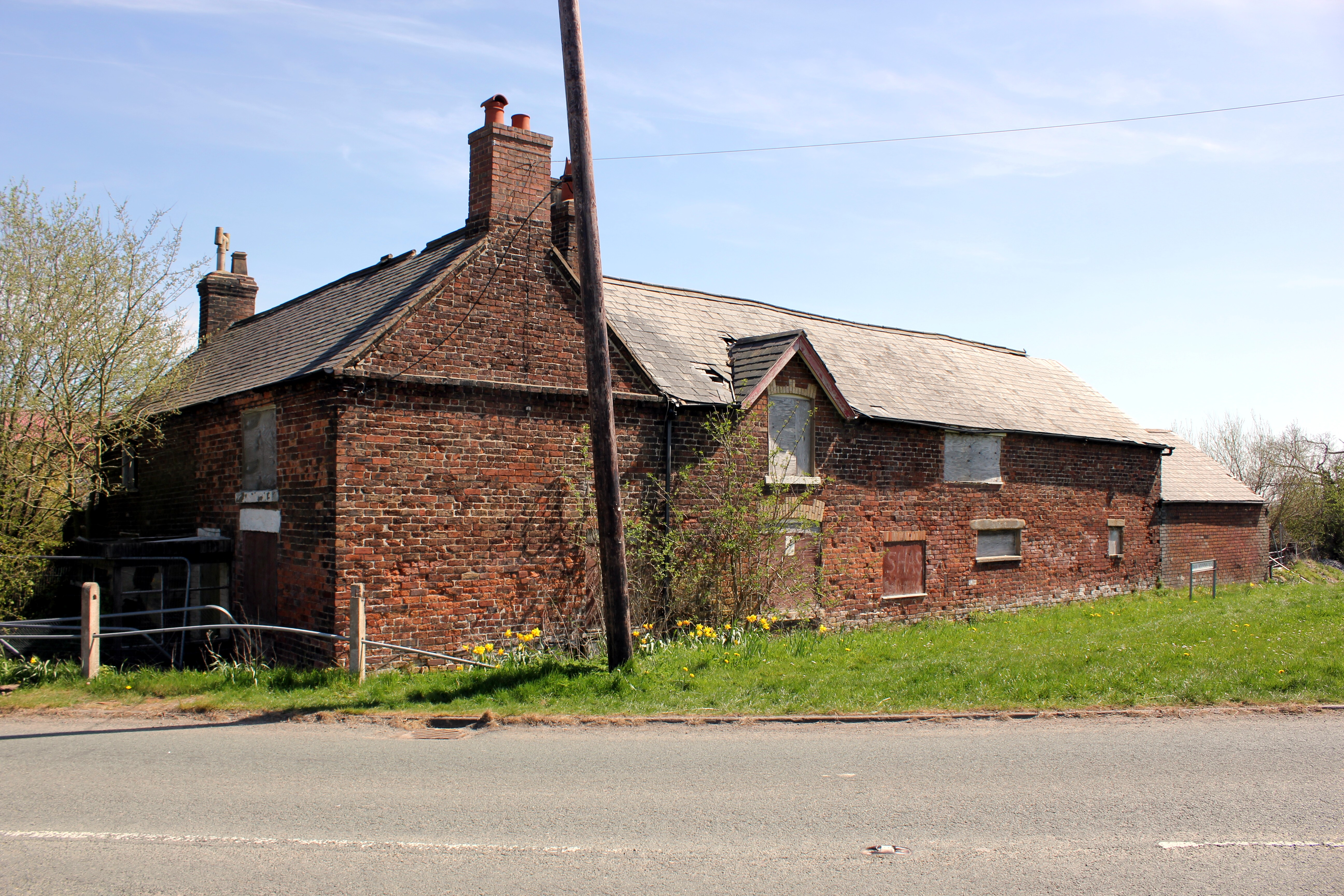
- Bank Farm, Penymynydd

- Location within Flintshire
- OS grid reference: SJ304626
- Principal area: Flintshire
- Preserved county: Clwyd
- Country: Wales
- Sovereign state: United Kingdom
- Post town: CHESTER
- Postcode district: CH4
- Dialling code: 01244
- Police: North Wales
- Fire: North Wales
- Ambulance: Welsh
- UK Parliament: Alyn and Deeside
- Senedd Cymru – Welsh Parliament: Alyn and Deeside

Penymynydd is a small village in Flintshire, Wales, merging with the larger neighbouring village of Penyffordd. The name Penymynydd is Welsh, meaning "top" or "end of the mountain".

The village consists of a number of modern housing estates (Well House Drive, Coed Terfyn, Coed Y Graig), and also housing on Penymynydd Road (most of which is in Penyffordd). Penymynydd has one church: St John The Baptist's Church. A second church formerly existed in the village and has since been redeveloped. St John The Baptist's Primary School is church aided and takes children between the ages of 3 and 11.
