= Cwmann =

Village in Carmarthenshire, Wales

Coordinates: 52°06′N 4°04′W

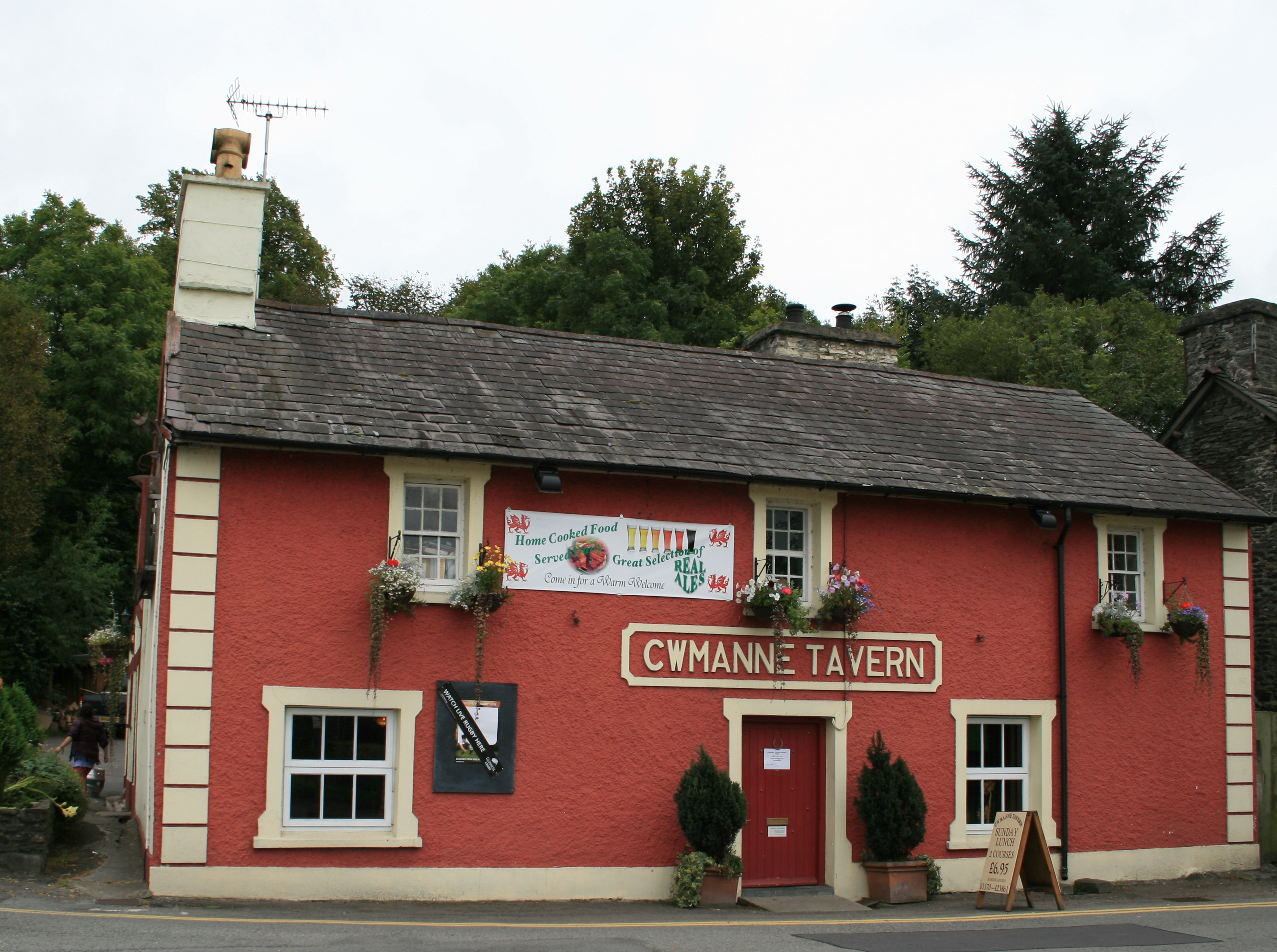
Cwmanne Tavern

Cwmann is a small village in Carmarthenshire, Wales, in the community of Pencarreg. It is just on the border with Ceredigion and near Lampeter, with Cwmann being on the Carmarthenshire side of the border. The population in 2011 was around 872. As of 2021, the population was approximately 972.

Cwmann is home to the Cwmanne Tavern. Cwmann sits on the banks of the River Teifi (Welsh: Afon Teifi). Lampeter is situated the other side.
