= Benton Castle =

Small castle in Burton, Wales

- Burton, Pembrokeshire
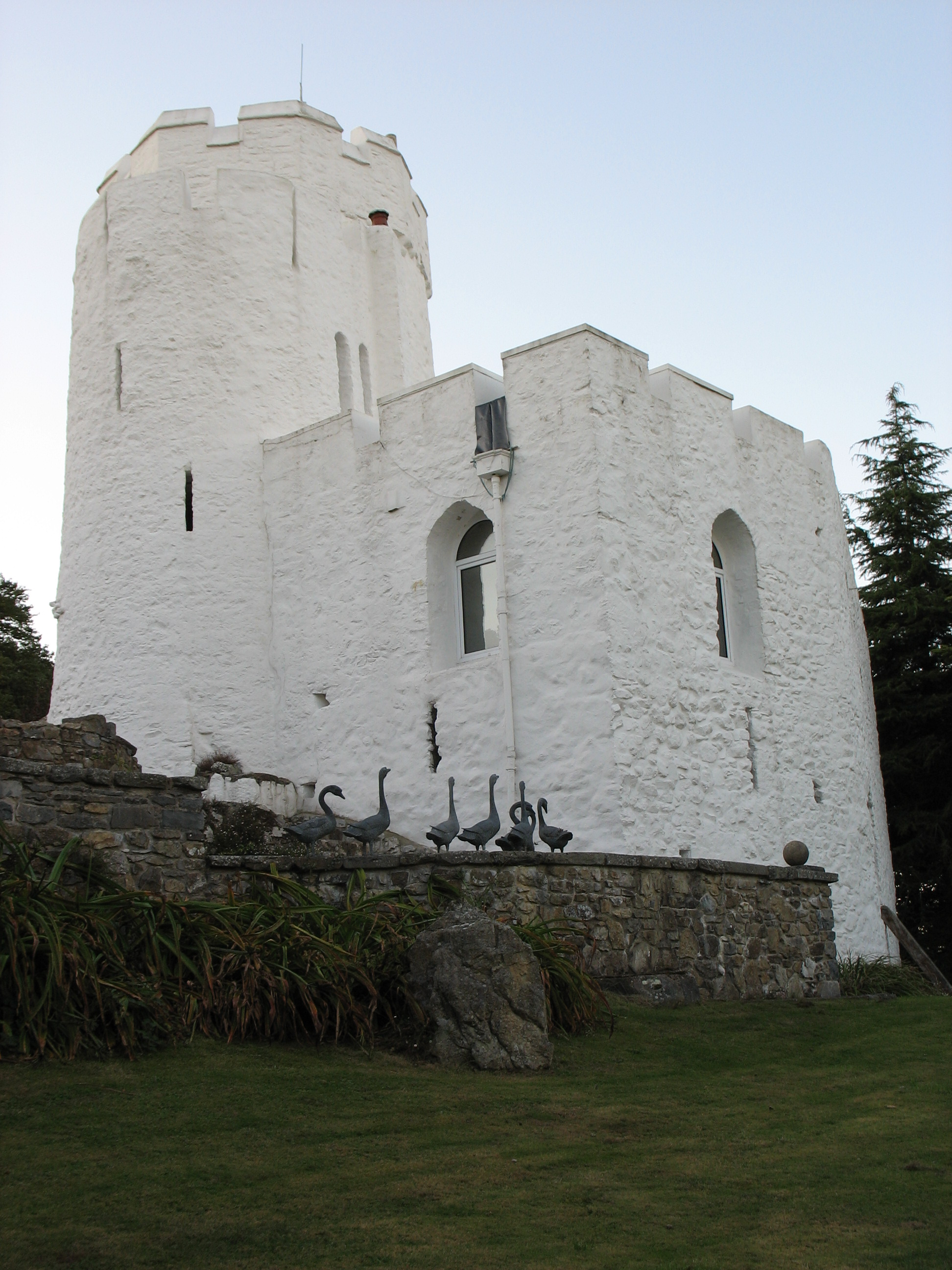

Site information
- Type: Norman
- Open to the public: No
- Condition: Restored, private dwelling

Location
- Coordinates: 51°43′31″N 4°53′22″W

Site history
- Battles/wars: English Civil War

Listed Building – Grade II*
- Official name: Benton Castle
- Designated: 13 December 1951; 74 years ago
- Reference no.: 11981

Benton Castle is a small fortification in the community of Burton, Pembrokeshire, Wales, now in use as a private house, in a wooded area overlooking the Cleddau river.

== History ==
The castle was probably built in the 13th century, one of a number of castles protecting the boundaries of the ancient Hundred of Rhos. It consists of two round towers of differing heights flanking the main entrance, with a courtyard behind. It is claimed to be the smallest enclosure castle in Britain. Its origins are obscure, but in the 14th century it was held by Thomas de Roche, Lord of Llangwm. A 1583 map of Pembrokeshire shows the castle on the west bank of the Eastern Cleddau (Clethy), and George Owen mentions it in 1603. The waterway was busy until recent times.

The castle is said to have been held and damaged in the Civil War, falling into ruin thereafter.

Richard Fenton, in his 1811 Historical Tour, says:

The castle is built nearly on the same model as Roch, but with fewer decorations within. The main tower is almost circular, the upper part ending in a highly-finished octagon; from the existing fragments there seems to have been much building annexed to the tower on the north-east side.

Lewis's Topographical Dictionary of 1844 says:

Among the most interesting objects in the vicinity are the remains of Burton (sic) castle, on the western shore of the haven, probably erected by some of the Normans, as a border fortress for the protection of the territory which they had acquired on this part of the coast. It does not appear to have been originally of very great extent; and the present ruins, which, from their situation on the margin of an estuary of Milford haven, have a truly picturesque appearance, consist principally of a lofty round tower, which rising above the thriving plantations in the vicinity, forms a conspicuous feature in the landscape.

In 1888, Edward Laws describes the castle as one of a chain protecting south Pembrokeshire, especially Milford Haven, from invasion in the 12th and 13th centuries:

A mere round tower surrounded by an octagonal battlement probably of later date. This tower was originally divided into three stories, but as the floors were of wood they have disappeared. There seem to have been no fire-places nor are there any remains of stairs, so that the various chambers must have been approached by a ladder. The tower could not have been much more than a look-out, and place of refuge in times of extreme danger for the detachment of troops who dwelt in a plot of ground which surrounded the castle, and was in its turn surrounded by earthworks.

=== Renovation ===
The ruins were stabilised in the early 20th century, and it remained uninhabited until 1930, after which date it was renovated. The courtyard was roofed by 1954, and the building was sold in the 1960s and further restored. The castle is whitewashed and has been Grade II* listed "for its historic interest and rarity as a restored small medieval castle".
