= Pont Henri =

Village in Carmarthenshire, Wales

Coordinates: 51.760°N 4.202°W

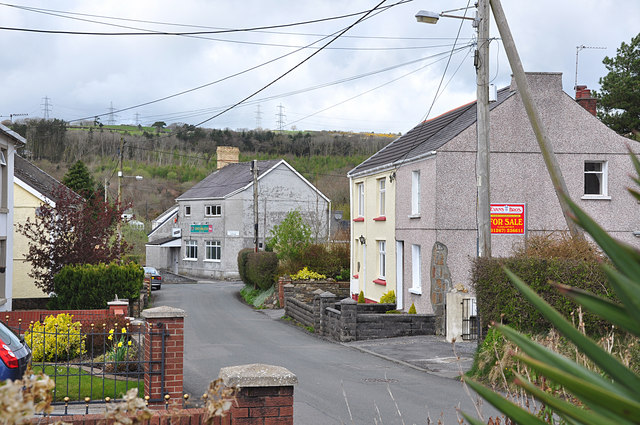
Leaving Ponthenri to the north west

Pont Henri (or Ponthenri) is a small rural village in Wales, has a population over 600 inhabitants, located in the centre of the Gwendraeth Valley, halfway between the towns of Carmarthen and Llanelli. Following reorganisation of constituency boundaries for the 2024 General Election the village now comes under the Parliamentary constituency of Llanelli. On a Community level most of the village is under the jurisdiction of Llanelli Rural Council while the rest of the village is represented by Llangendeirne Community Council. The electoral boundary in Pont-Henri follows the course of the Gwendraeth Fawr river.

There is a local shop, a village restaurant (the Baltic) and a social club. Other facilities include a community hall, a play area,a submarine museum and a football pitch, a Baptist chapel named the “Bethesda chapel” and an industrial estate.

Some of the village's famous residents include former Wales goalkeeper Ron Howells and former Wales Darts Captain Eric Burden. BBC Rugby correspondent Gareth Charles is also from Pont-Henri. Former Dragons professional Rugby Union player and Wales Under 20's international Nic Cudd is also from Ponthenri. It is also home to the late Ken Owens, the most famous bin man in Wales who was also renowned for his tales of playing soccer with an old water sodden leather football.

In June 1989, a Westland WS-61 Sea King Helicopter encountered an issue and was forced to make an emergency landing on the village green, it then crashed onto the village green scattering debris in the vicinity and within 80 yards (70 metres) of the village school. One of the Rotor blades hit a nearby house, but nobody was injured in the incident.
