= Greenala Point =

- Headland
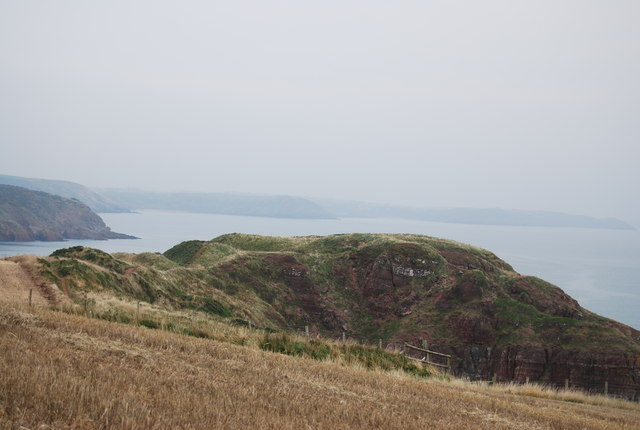
- The fort, viewed from the west with the Pembrokeshire Coast Path in the foreground

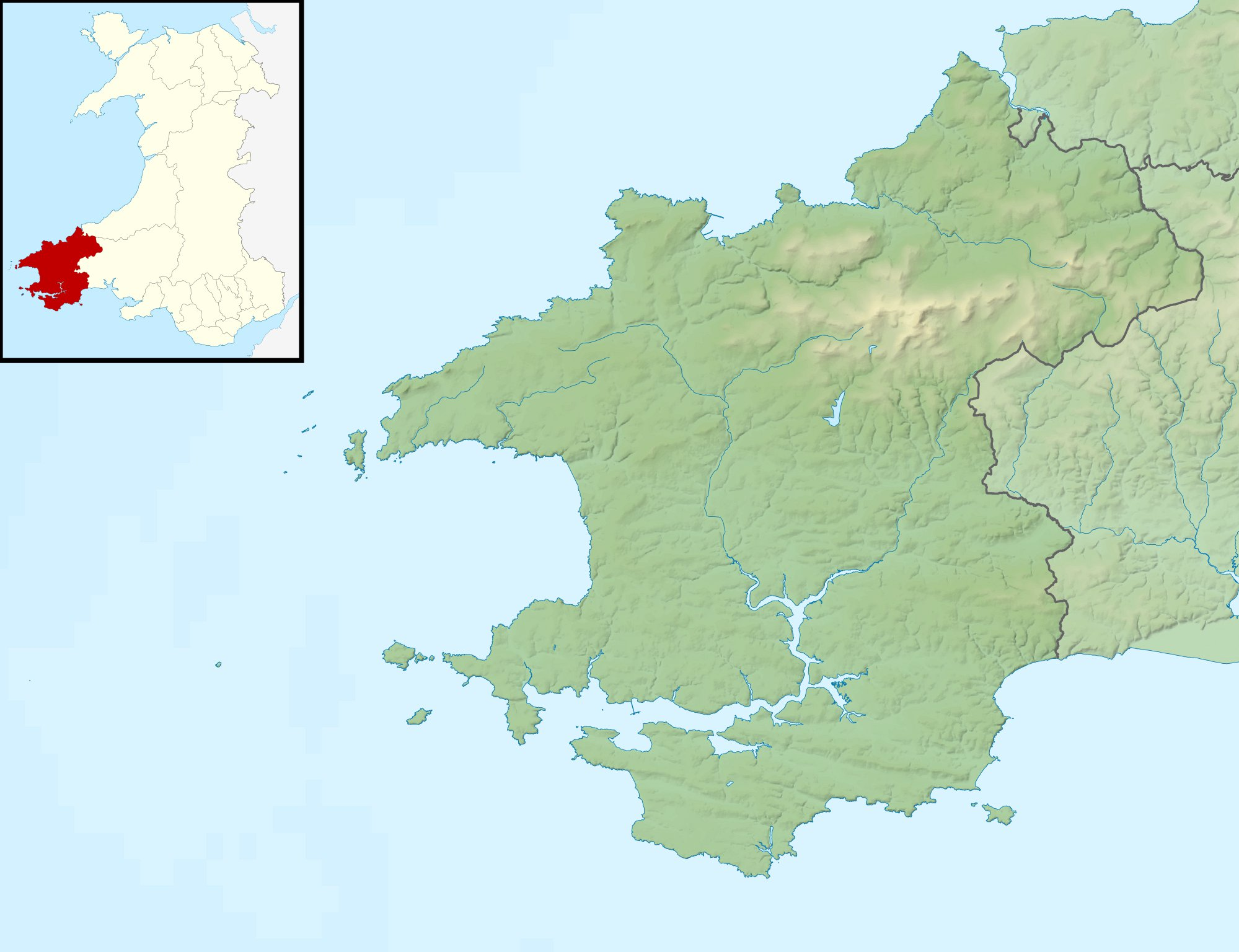
- Shown within Pembrokeshire
- Coordinates: 51°37′57″N 4°52′54″W
- Grid position: SS 006 966
- Location: near Pembroke
- Operator: National Trust

Area
  - Total: 1.8 hectares (4.4 acres)
- Designation: Scheduled monument

Greenala Point is a headland on the south coast of Pembrokeshire, Wales, about a 5-kilometre (3-mile) walk south from Pembroke. As part of the former Stackpole Estate, it was acquired by the National Trust in 1976.

The Pembrokeshire Coast Path passes through the western ramparts of the fort on Greenala Point.

== Promontory fort ==
The Iron Age promontory fort, known as Greenala Point Fort or Greenala Camp is a scheduled monument.

The fort, occupying 1.8 hectares (4.4 acres), is defended on the east and south by sandstone cliffs, and to the north by the terracing of a steep slope; the innermost of the four resulting slopes has a height of nearly 5 metres (16 ft).

The interior of the fort, an area of 0.4 hectares (1.0 acre), is bordered on the west by a straight bank, of which the outer face is nearly 4 metres (13 ft) above a triangular annexe. Beyond this is a series of three banks and ditches. The Pembrokeshire Coast Path passes through these western ramparts.

There has been coastal erosion, and the fort was once larger; there are traces of defences on at least one of the adjacent stacks.
