= Esgyrn Bottom =

Protected area in Pembrokeshire, Wales

- Site of Special Scientific Interest
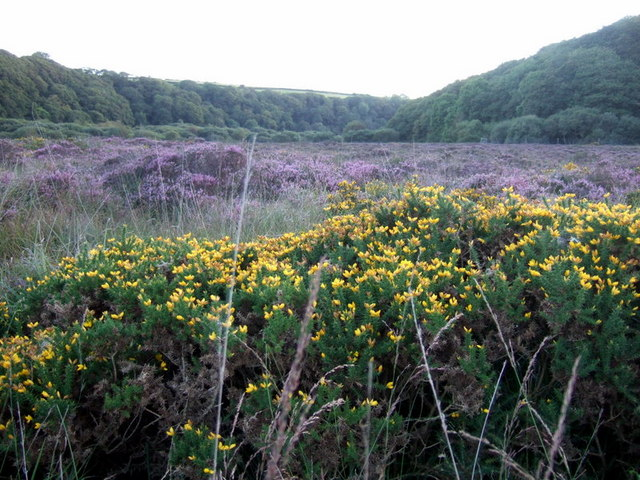

- Location within Wales
- Location of Esgyrn Bottom.
- Area of search: Pembrokeshire
- Grid reference: SM9756634637
- Coordinates: 51.973°N 4.947°W
- Interest: Biological and Geological
- Area: 49.9 hectares (123 acres)
- Notification date: 1957

Esgyrn Bottom is a Site of Special Scientific Interest (or SSSI) in Pembrokeshire, South Wales. It has been designated as a Site of Special Scientific Interest since January 1957 in an attempt to protect its fragile biological and geological elements. The site has an area of 49.9 hectares (123 acres) and is managed by Natural Resources Wales.

== Type ==
This SSSI has been notified as being of both geological and biological importance.

It has three special features.

- Raised bog
- Rare mosses and liverworts including: Sphagnum magellanicum and Sphagnum fuscum, and the liverworts Pallavicinia lyelii (veilwort) and Cephaloziella elachista
- Glacial meltwater channel and associated deposits

== See also ==
- List of Sites of Special Scientific Interest in Pembrokeshire
