= Green Bridge of Wales =

Natural arch in Pembrokeshire, Wales

Coordinates: 51.6104°N 4.9985°W

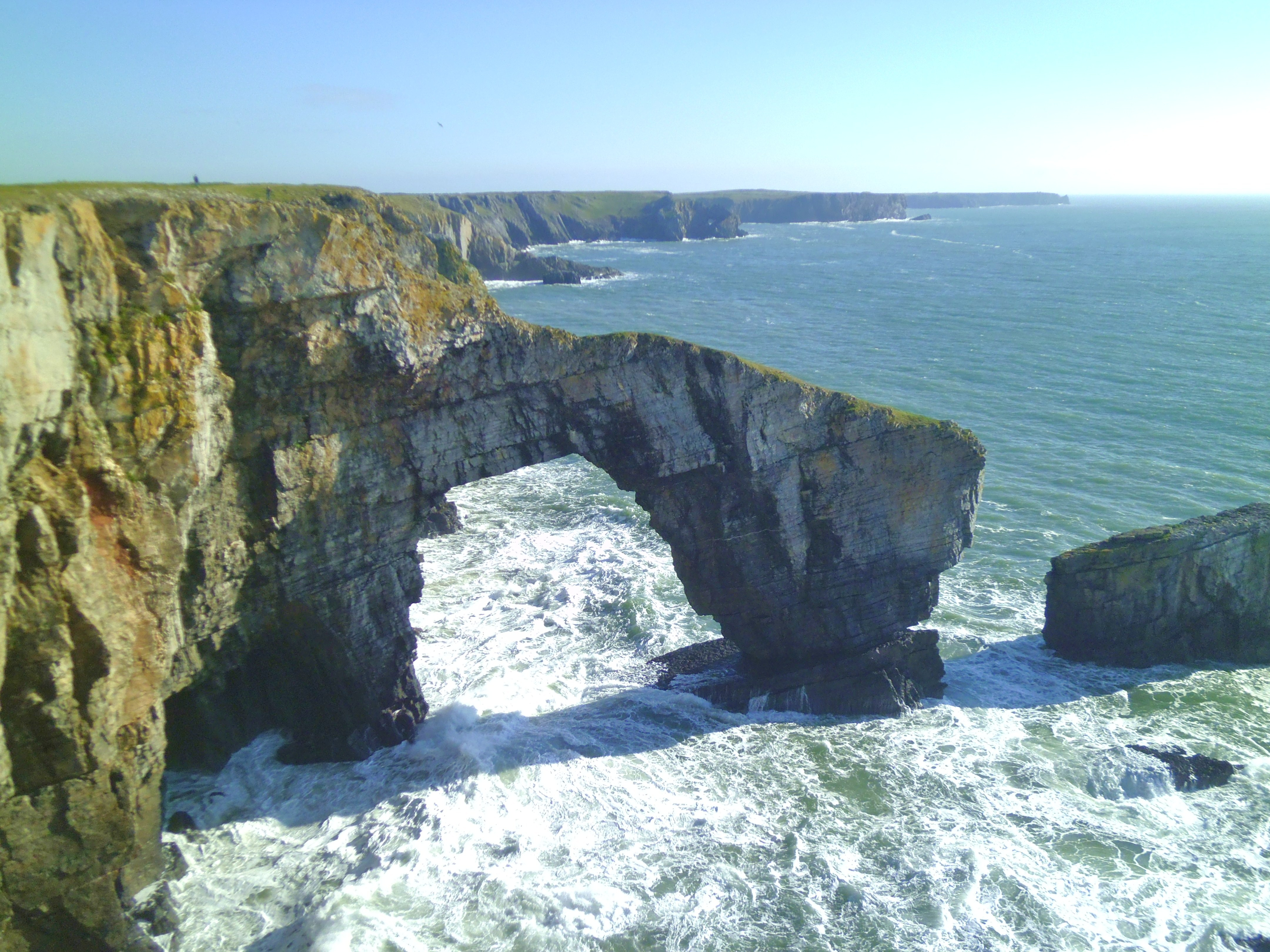
The Green Bridge of Wales

The Green Bridge of Wales (Welsh: Pont Werdd Cymru) is a natural arch formed from Carboniferous Limestone within the Pembrokeshire Coast National Park in Pembrokeshire, Wales. It is located in the Castlemartin Training Area, but access for the public is normally available.

Like the nearby Elegug Stacks and Huntsman's Leap further to the east, it is a popular visitor attraction and can be accessed by walkers from the Pembrokeshire Coast Path. Images of it appear frequently in tourism publications and geography textbooks. With a height of around 80 feet (24 m), the Natural Arch and Bridge Society describe it as 'probably the most spectacular arch in the United Kingdom'.

== Geology ==
The geology of the area in which the Green Bridge of Wales is located is composed of a very thick layer of Carboniferous Limestone, including a certain amount of chert. Erosion has occurred over time as storm winds have battered the coast, pebbles have been dashed against the rocks, sand particles have worn away the surface, and chemical erosion has dissolved the limestone. The weakest parts of the cliff are the first to be worn away, usually the folds and small faults that are present in the rocks. This has resulted over many millennia in the creation of many unusual landforms. In the case of the Green Bridge of Wales, erosion has taken place on both sides of a small headland, caves have been formed which extended further and further until they met, forming the arch that can be seen today. The bridge is about 24 m (80 ft) high with a span of more than 20 m (66 ft). Its outer edge rests on a more durable rock pedestal and its upper surface is clad in vegetation. The Green Bridge lost a considerable amount of rock to damage during Storm Ophelia in October 2017.
