= Pentre Maelor =

Village in Wrexham County Borough, Wales

Coordinates: 53.033578°N 2.935621°W

- Village
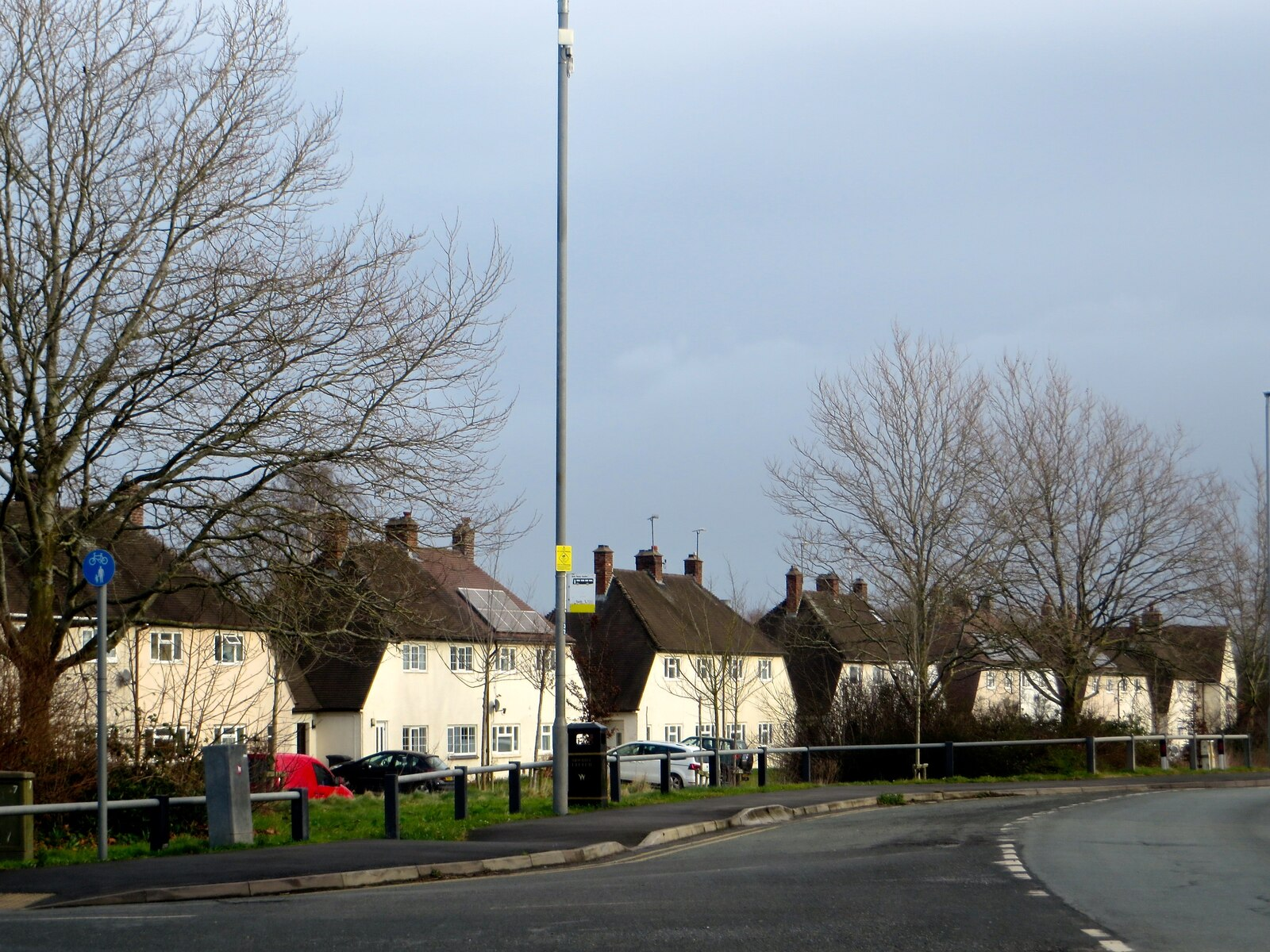
- Housing of the estate along Bridge Road South

- Location within Wrexham
- Area: 0.3375 km^{2} (0.1303 sq mi)
- Population: 305 (2011 census)
  - Density: 904/km^{2} (2,340/sq mi)
- OS grid reference: SJ 3735 4888
- Community: Abenbury
- Principal area: Wrexham
- Preserved county: Clwyd
- Country: Wales
- Sovereign state: United Kingdom
- Post town: WREXHAM
- Postcode district: LL13
- Dialling code: 01978
- Police: North Wales
- Fire: North Wales
- Ambulance: Welsh
- UK Parliament: Wrexham
- Senedd Cymru – Welsh Parliament: Wrexham

Pentre Maelor is a housing estate near Wrexham Industrial Estate in Wrexham County Borough, Wales. In the 2011 census, its built-up area had a population of 305.

The village is part of the community of Abenbury, and forms the majority of the community's population. The River Clywedog flows just south of the village. Pentre Maelor was established in 1947 as a housing estate to provide accommodation for workers from factories in the area. The village has retained its original layout, which consists of a rectangular central lock and connected 'wings' of houses, each of which is built around a green space. One of those green spaces located in the centre of the estate, is an Owain Glyndwr Field protected by Fields in Trust, and operated by Wrexham County Borough Council.

== History ==
The housing estate was originally known as "Pilgrim's Place", as the area served as a burial place for non-conformists who were not allowed a burial at Wrexham Cemetery. The first non-conformist to be buried was J Lloyd of Bryn Agog Hall of which the area surrounding his grave was given the name.

During World War II, the UK Government built a Royal Ordnance Factory in the area, producing cordite, for use in firing shells. Following the war, the area was developed into a trading estate when the land came under the ownership of the Board of Trade. The first factories on the estate, were built for Courtaulds, Johnson & Johnson and British Tissue. Pentre Maelor was developed as a housing estate to accommodate these factory workers. The housing estate was built in 1947 by Edward Gittings and the first residents moved in by 1948.

HM Prison Berwyn was built in 2017, to a short distance north-east of the housing estate. Prior to its eventual construction, residents of the estate were consulted on the proposals.
