= Skomer Volcanic Group =

Group
- Stratigraphic range: Silurian
- Type: Group
- Underlies: upper Llandovery shales and sandstone
- Overlies: Ordovician rocks
- Thickness: about 1000m

Lithology
- Primary: lava flows
- Other: breccias, conglomerates, quartzitess, clay rocks

Location
- Region: West Wales
- Country: Wales
- Extent: Skomer and adjacent parts of mainland Wales

Type section
- Named for: Skomer island

The Skomer Volcanic Group is a Silurian lithostratigraphic group (a sequence of rock strata) in Pembrokeshire, Wales. The name is derived from the island of Skomer off the west coast of Pembrokeshire. It was traditionally known as the Skomer Volcanic Series. The rocks are exposed across the island of Skomer and along the northern half of the nearby Marloes peninsula as far east as St Ishmaels.

== Lithology and stratigraphy ==
The Group comprises around 1000m thickness of lava flows and associated strata including felsite, albite-trachyte, keratophyre etc laid down during the Silurian Period.
