= South Cornelly =

Village in Bridgend, Wales

Coordinates: 51°30′25″N 3°42′25″W

South Cornelly (Welsh: Corneli Waelod) is a village in Cornelly, Bridgend county borough, Wales. The village is close to North Cornelly, Pyle and Porthcawl, and junction 37 of the M4 motorway, which runs along its northern side. It is in the historic county of Glamorgan. The population was 471 in 2011.

The village is accessible from the motorway, the A4229 and the A48. There are regular buses to Porthcawl, Bridgend and Port Talbot. The nearest railway station is Pyle.

South Cornelly came into being as an Anglo-Norman settlement in the second half of the 12th century. The village is named after St Cornelius, and is the 'original' Cornelly, though a document of the time indicates that it was almost known as 'Thomastown' after Thomas son of William, an early local Lord of the Manor. His descendants subsequently adopted the name 'De Cornelly' and their house is believed to have been located at the site of the mansion called Ty Maen on the main road through the village.
