= Huntsman's Leap =

Coastal chasm in Wales

Coordinates: 51.598517°N 4.944436°W

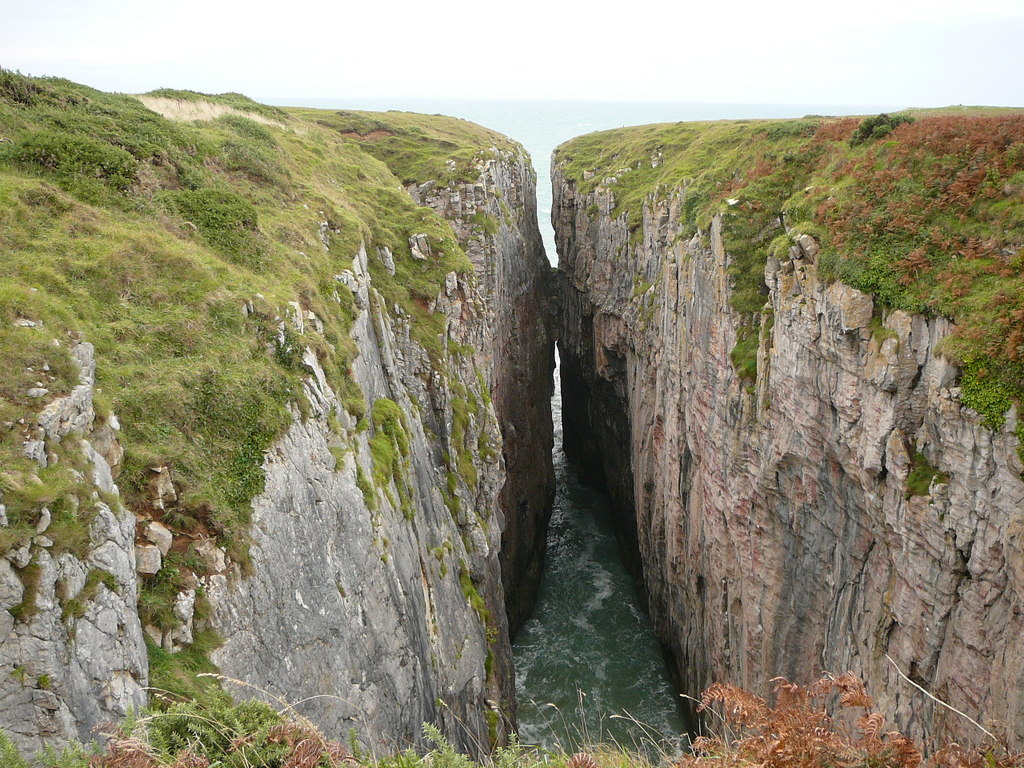
View into Huntsman's Leap chasm

Huntsman's Leap is a deep, narrow and sheer-sided coastal chasm or geo developed in the Carboniferous Limestone of the Pembrokeshire Coast National Park, Pembrokeshire, Wales. Like the nearby Green Bridge of Wales and St Govan's Chapel, it is a popular visitor attraction which lies beside the Pembrokeshire Coast Path. The site lies within the eastern sector of the Ministry of Defence's Castlemartin military training area, but access for the public is normally available.

The name derives from local folklore, a hunter on horseback, being chased by the devil is said to have jumped from one side of the chasm to the other. On looking back and seeing the gap that he had jumped, he died of shock.

Cut into thick beds of Carboniferous limestone on the south side of the Castlemartin peninsula, Huntsman's Leap is the best-known of a string of structurally guided "geos" where the coast path teeters on the lip of near-vertical walls 45–50 m high. The chasm follows a tight cluster of joints and small faults; wave scour along these planes first excavated a sea-cave and then, when its roof became too thin to support itself, the cave ceiling collapsed to leave today's slot-shaped cleft. Tidal surges and salt-spray still batter the floor and lower walls, while freeze-thaw and block fall keep the cliff-top edge raw. A narrow neck at the landward end funnels sea spray far inland during storms, accentuating the dramatic viewpoint that draws walkers and rock-climbers alike despite the Ministry of Defence's range warning notices.

Geomorphologists prize the Leap because it captures, at a single glance, the full sequence of coastal-karst processes that shape the South Pembroke Cliffs Geological Conservation Review site. Brian John showed that more than fifty separate faults in this short stretch of coast have been exploited to create aligned caves, blow-holes and geos, with Huntsman's Leap representing the mature stage of that evolution. HR Wallingford's regional survey adds that the feature almost certainly originated by roof-collapse and notes how its sheer walls, streaked with solution runnels, continue to widen under a mix of chemical weathering and wave-powered abrasion. Together these studies make the Leap a textbook example of how hard-rock coasts retreat where marine erosion intersects pre-existing karst and tectonic weaknesses—one reason the inlet is cited in national assessments of Britain's most significant coastal landforms.
