= Houghton, Pembrokeshire =

Village in Pembrokeshire, Wales

Coordinates: 51.726°N 4.92°W

Houghton
- Location within Pembrokeshire
- OS grid reference: SM985072
- Community: Burton
- Principal area: Pembrokeshire
- Country: Wales
- Sovereign state: United Kingdom
- Post town: Milford Haven
- Postcode district: SA73
- Police: Dyfed-Powys
- Fire: Mid and West Wales
- Ambulance: Welsh
- UK Parliament: Preseli Pembrokeshire
- Senedd Cymru – Welsh Parliament: Preseli Pembrokeshire

Houghton is a village in the parish and community of Burton in south Pembrokeshire, Wales. It is 1 mile (1.6 km) north of Burton village.

== Burton Jubilee Hall ==
Burton Jubilee Hall in Houghton is the venue for community council meetings. The hall was established in 1908 as a reading room and was bought by the parish in 1923, becoming a charitable trust in 1963. Burton Community Council became custodian trustees in 1984.

== School ==
Burton voluntary controlled primary school was founded in 1844 and served a number of settlements in the parish. It was in Houghton until the 2010s, when it was amalgamated with Llangwm VC Primary School.

== Worship ==
John Wesley preached in the village twice, in 1771 and 1777, on his way through the county, and it may have been at one of three preaching crosses in the parish. He reported in his journal (for 1771) - "I preached at Houghton to a lovely congregation of plain artless people." There does not appear to have been a permanent place of worship in Houghton, but the schoolroom was licensed for divine service in 1865. It is reported that there was a holy well, Bishop's Well, near Houghton, located just outside the school gates.
