= Sardis, south Pembrokeshire =

Village in Pembrokeshire, Wales

Coordinates: 51.7404°N 4.9411°W

Sardis
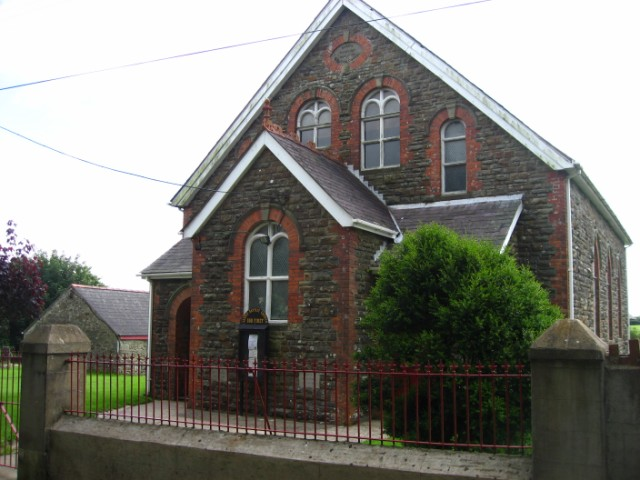
- Sardis Baptist Chapel

- Location within Pembrokeshire
- OS grid reference: SM 9704 0873
- Community: Burton
- Principal area: Pembrokeshire
- Country: Wales
- Sovereign state: United Kingdom
- Post town: Milford Haven
- Dialling code: 01646
- Police: Dyfed-Powys
- Fire: Mid and West Wales
- Ambulance: Welsh

Sardis (also known as Sardis Cross) is a small village in the community and parish of Burton, Pembrokeshire, Wales. It lies 1 mile (2 km) east of Rosemarket at 75 metres above sea level.

== Worship ==
Sardis Baptist Chapel was built in 1822. The minister for Pembroke Dock, quoted in an 1851 religious census, described the congregation as scattered, with the weather sometimes greatly affecting attendance. Chapel registers are held by Dyfed Family History Society.

Sardis falls under the Church in Wales parish of Burton. The church of St Mary's is a grade II* listed building.

== Armed robbery ==
An armed robbery in the village helped lead to the apprehension and eventual conviction of serial killer John Cooper for murders committed in the 1980s.
