= Pen-y-ffordd =

Hamlet in north Flintshire, Wales

Coordinates: 53.332°N 3.303°W

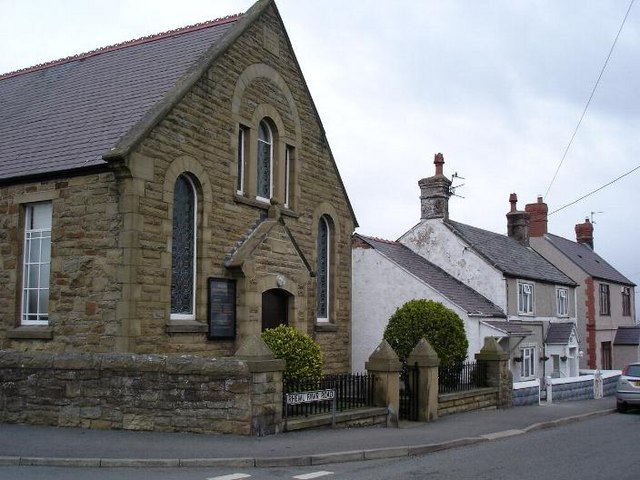
- Chapel and cottages, Pen-y-ffordd

- Location within Flintshire
- OS grid reference: SJ133824
- Principal area: Flintshire
- Preserved county: Flintshire
- Country: Wales
- Sovereign state: United Kingdom
- Post town: HOLYWELL
- Postcode district: CH8
- Dialling code: 01745
- Police: North Wales
- Fire: North Wales
- Ambulance: Welsh
- UK Parliament: Alyn and Deeside
- Senedd Cymru – Welsh Parliament: Delyn

Pen-y-ffordd is a hamlet in Flintshire, Wales. It is located between Holywell and Prestatyn, to the north west of Mostyn.

The actor and writer Emlyn Williams was born here.
