= Llangwm, Pembrokeshire =

Village, parish and community in Pembrokeshire, Wales

Llangwm
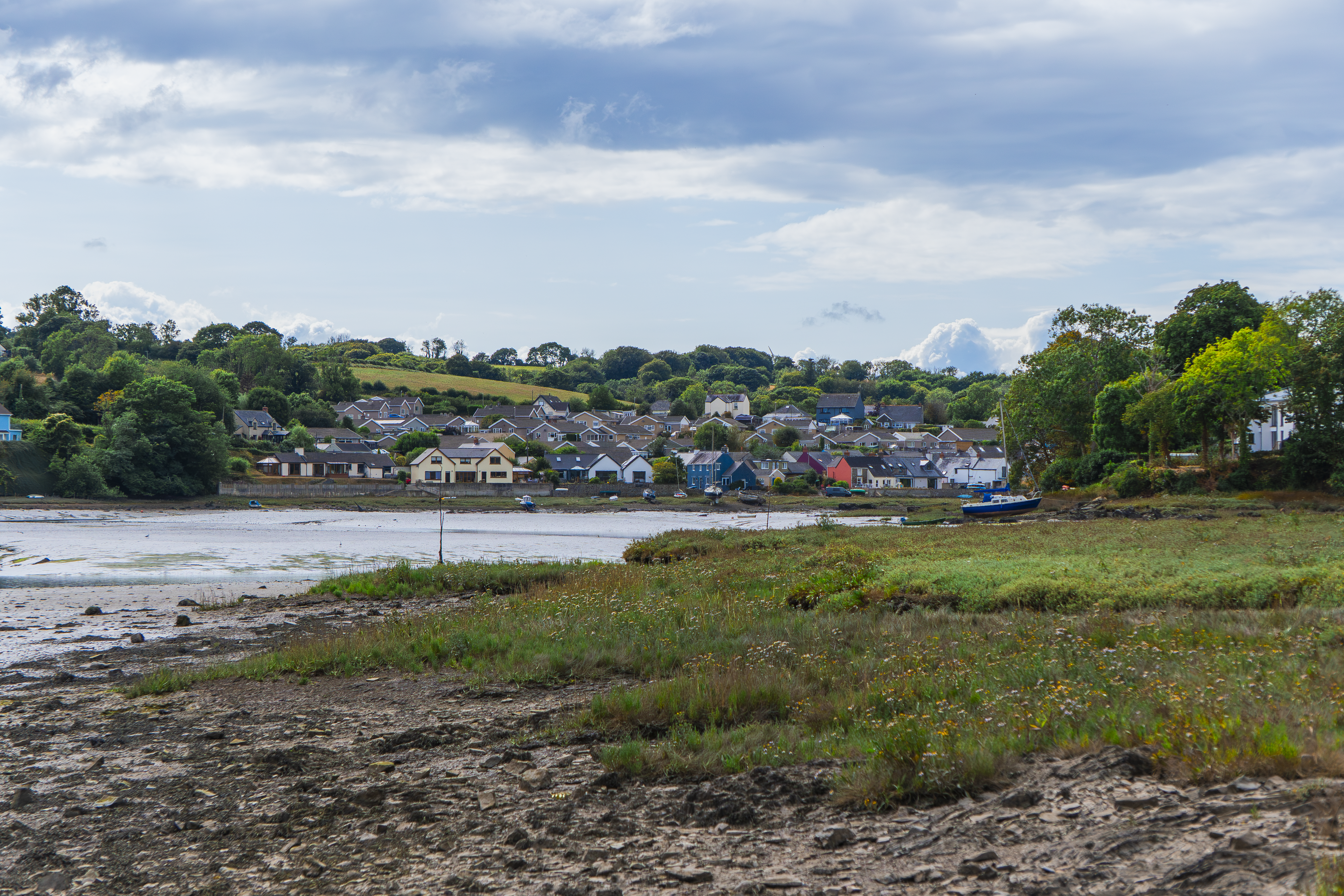

- Location within Pembrokeshire
- Population: 875 (2011)
- Principal area: Pembrokeshire
- Preserved county: Dyfed
- Country: Wales
- Sovereign state: United Kingdom
- Post town: Haverfordwest
- Postcode district: SA62
- Dialling code: 01437
- Police: Dyfed-Powys
- Fire: Mid and West Wales
- Ambulance: Welsh
- UK Parliament: Mid and South Pembrokeshire
- Senedd Cymru – Welsh Parliament: Ceredigion Penfro
- List of places UK Wales Pembrokeshire 51.747°N 4.912°W Map of the community

Llangwm (/ˈlæŋəm/ or /ˈlæŋɡəm/; Welsh pronunciation: [ˈɬaŋgʊm]) is a small village, parish and community of around 450 properties situated on the Llangwm Pill off the River Cleddau estuary near Haverfordwest, Pembrokeshire, Wales. It has a history of mining and fishing and is in the largely English-speaking south of the county.

== History ==
The parish was in the hundred of Roose, at the heart of Little England beyond Wales, and has been largely English-speaking since the 12th century, when it was settled by Flemish immigrants. Flemish occupation is under investigation by Dyfed Archaeological Trust, but the Trust's investigations have also uncovered evidence of occupation in the late Mesolithic period of the Stone Age, some 6,000 to 8,000 years ago.

Llawgwm was part of a discontiguous subsidiary manor of Walwyn's Castle, having its caput at Benton Castle nearby, in the coastal woodland to the south east of Llawgwm.

Principal occupations in the early 19th century were oyster fishing and coal production; coal was shipped from Hook.

Fox Hall is recorded by the Royal Commission as a historic place name.

== Governance ==
An electoral ward with the same name exists. This ward stretches north west with a total population of 2,336.

== Amenities ==
The parish church, a medieval Grade II listed building, is dedicated to St Jerome. The church dates from the 14th century, but was substantially altered in the 19th century.

The village has two nonconformist chapels, a primary school, pharmacy and shop and a pub, The Cottage Inn.

Popular with visitors throughout the year, with extensive use of the river estuary and local walks, the village holds a festival in the last week of June and the first week of July.

== Sport ==
Llangwm Rowing Club uses Celtic Longboats at sea. Llangwm Rugby Club and cricket club are both active.

== Culture ==
In 2014, residents of the village performed a musical piece to mark the centenary of the beginning of World War I. Entitled "WW1 – A Village Opera", the work, written by Pembrokeshire author and poet Peter George, with music by Llangwm resident Sam Howley, wove the stories of villagers affected by the war into the greater political narrative of the buildup to war.

Llangwm is home to Pembrokeshire's newest literary festival, the Llangwm Literary Festival. The festival, held each August, includes activities for both adults and for children, including creative writing and art workshops. Festival events are hosted in venues around the village. The festival has welcomed various people including Griff Rhys Jones, Tristan Gooley, Ferdinand Mount, Diana Darke, David Horspool and Brian John to talk about such subjects as Wales, comedy, history, tragedy and navigation. Local artists have also featured.
