= Burton, Pembrokeshire =

Village, parish and community in Pembrokeshire, Wales

Burton
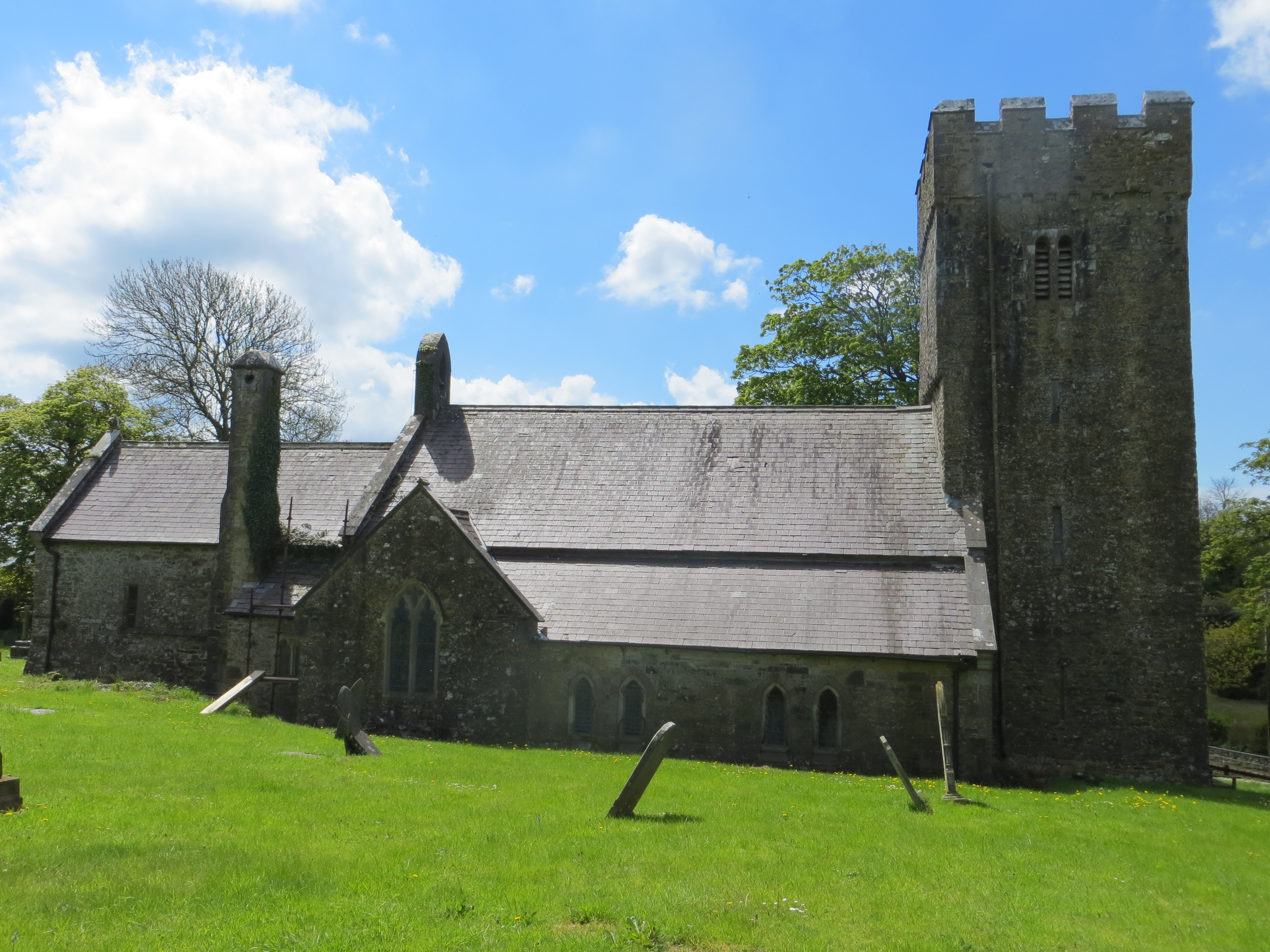
- St Mary's Church

- Location within Pembrokeshire
- Population: 1,213 (2011)
- OS grid reference: SM984056
- Principal area: Pembrokeshire
- Country: Wales
- Sovereign state: United Kingdom
- Post town: HAVERFORDWEST
- Postcode district: SA62
- Post town: MILFORD HAVEN
- Postcode district: SA73
- Dialling code: 01639
- Police: Dyfed-Powys
- Fire: Mid and West Wales
- Ambulance: Welsh
- UK Parliament: Preseli Pembrokeshire
- Senedd Cymru – Welsh Parliament: Ceredigion Penfro
- List of places UK Wales Pembrokeshire 51°42′41″N 4°55′08″W Map of the community

Burton is a small village, parish and community in Pembrokeshire, Wales, set on a hill overlooking the River Cleddau with views of the estuary to the south, east and west. The community includes the village of Hill Mountain.

== History ==
In 1844, the population of the parish was 846 and included several scattered settlements to the north.

== Worship ==
The parish church of St Mary's is a grade II* listed building.

There are two places of worship: one for Baptists, and one for Wesleyan Methodists.

== Castle ==
Benton Castle is a Grade II* listed building. It was originally a 13th-century fortification, later falling into ruin, and subsequently stabilised and converted to a dwelling in the 20th century.

== Local Government ==
The village has an elected community council and gives its name to an electoral ward of Pembrokeshire County Council. The electoral ward of Burton covers the community of Rosemarket. Since reorganisation in 1995 the ward has mainly been held by Independent councillors, although it was briefly held by the Conservatives after the 1999 election. The total population of the above ward at the 2011 census was 1826
