= Gelli =

Gelli may refer to:

== People ==
Given name

- Gelli de Belen (born 1973), Filipina actress and former child star
- Gelli Meyrick (also Gelly or Gilly) (1556?–1601), Welsh supporter of Robert Devereux, 2nd Earl of Essex, and conspirator in Essex's rebellion

Surname

- Cesare Gelli (1932–2016), Italian actor and voice actor
- Chiaretta Gelli (1925–2007), Italian singer and film actress
- Eduardo Gelli (1853–1933), Italian painter
- Francesco Gelli (born 1996), Italian footballer
- Giambattista Gelli (1498–1563), Italian humanist
- Jacopo Gelli (born 2001), Italian footballer
- Licio Gelli (1919–2015), Italian fascist Freemason associated with the rogue Masonic lodge Propaganda Due or P2
- Mario Gelli (born 1957), Italian long-distance runner
- Ramesh Gelli, Indian bank executive

== Places ==
- Ardenis, Armenia, formerly Gelli
- Gelli, Rhondda, a district in the Rhondda Valley, South Wales
- Gelli, Pembrokeshire, a hamlet in Pembrokeshire, West Wales
- Mynydd y Gelli, Welsh mountain
- Gelli Formation, geologic formation in Wales
- The Gelli, country house situated between Tallarn Green and Tybroughton in Wrexham County Borough, Wales
- Gelli Bridge, two-arch bridge spanning the River Syfynwy a few yards before its confluence with the Eastern Cleddau, Wales
- Y Gelli, the Welsh name of Hay-on-Wye, Powys, Wales

== See also ==
- Gellis
