= Portrait of a Young Man (Pontormo) =

Painting by Pontormo

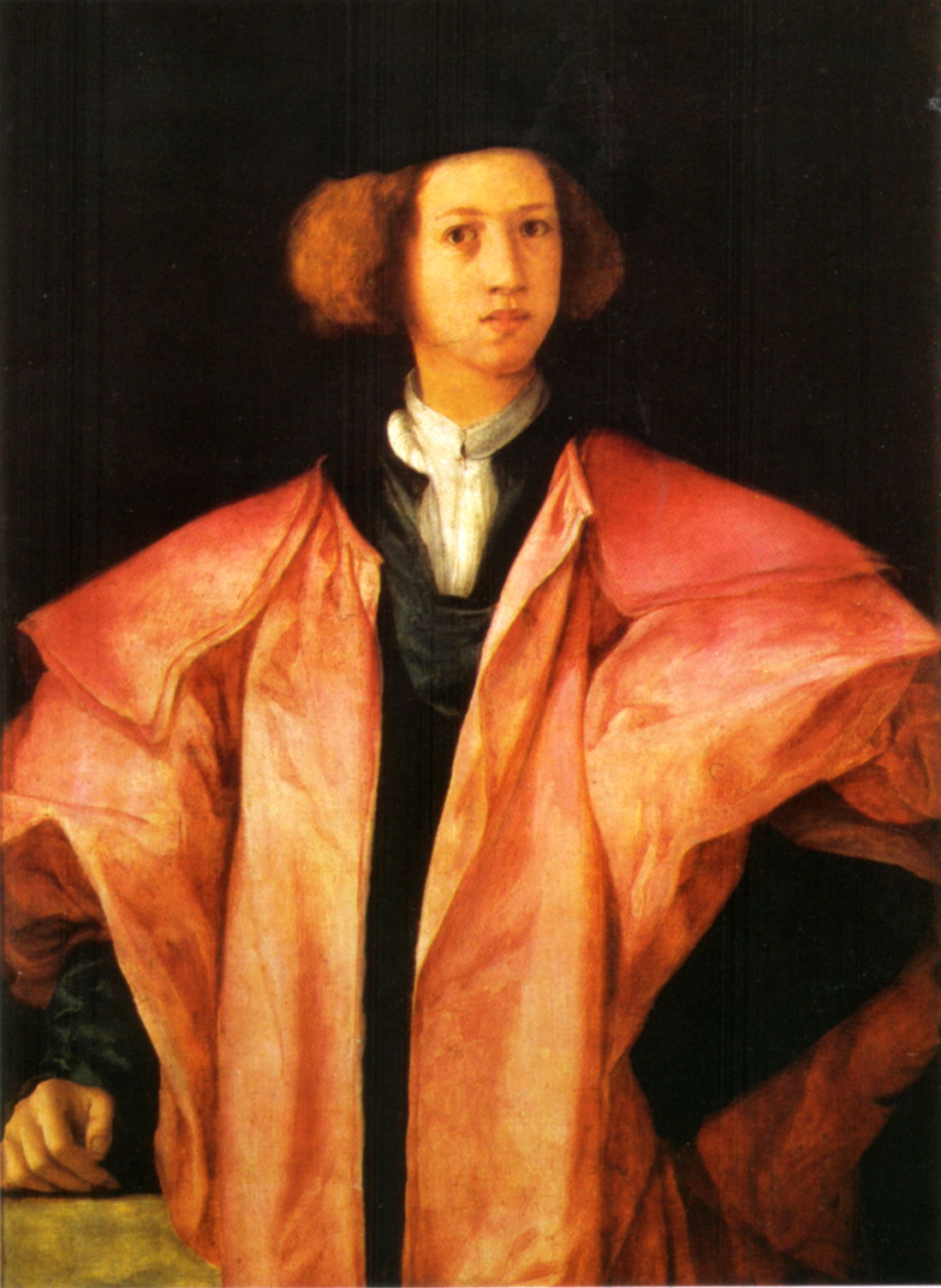
Portrait of a Young Man (c. 1525–1526) by Pontormo

Portrait of a Young Man is an oil on panel painting by Pontormo, executed c. 1525–1526, now in the Palazzo Mansi in Lucca. It may show Alessandro de' Medici, Duke of Florence.

It is one of the most important works from the nucleus of Florentine works given to Lucca by Leopold II, Grand Duke of Tuscany in compensation for the losses sustained in the sales of the collections of Charles Louis of Bourbon, already duke of Parma and Lucca, in the aftermath of the Duchy of Lucca's annexation by the Grand Duchy.
