= Francesco Vinea =

Italian painter (1845–1902)

Francesco Vinea (August 10, 1845 – October 22, 1902) was an Italian painter, known for his period costume genre subjects.

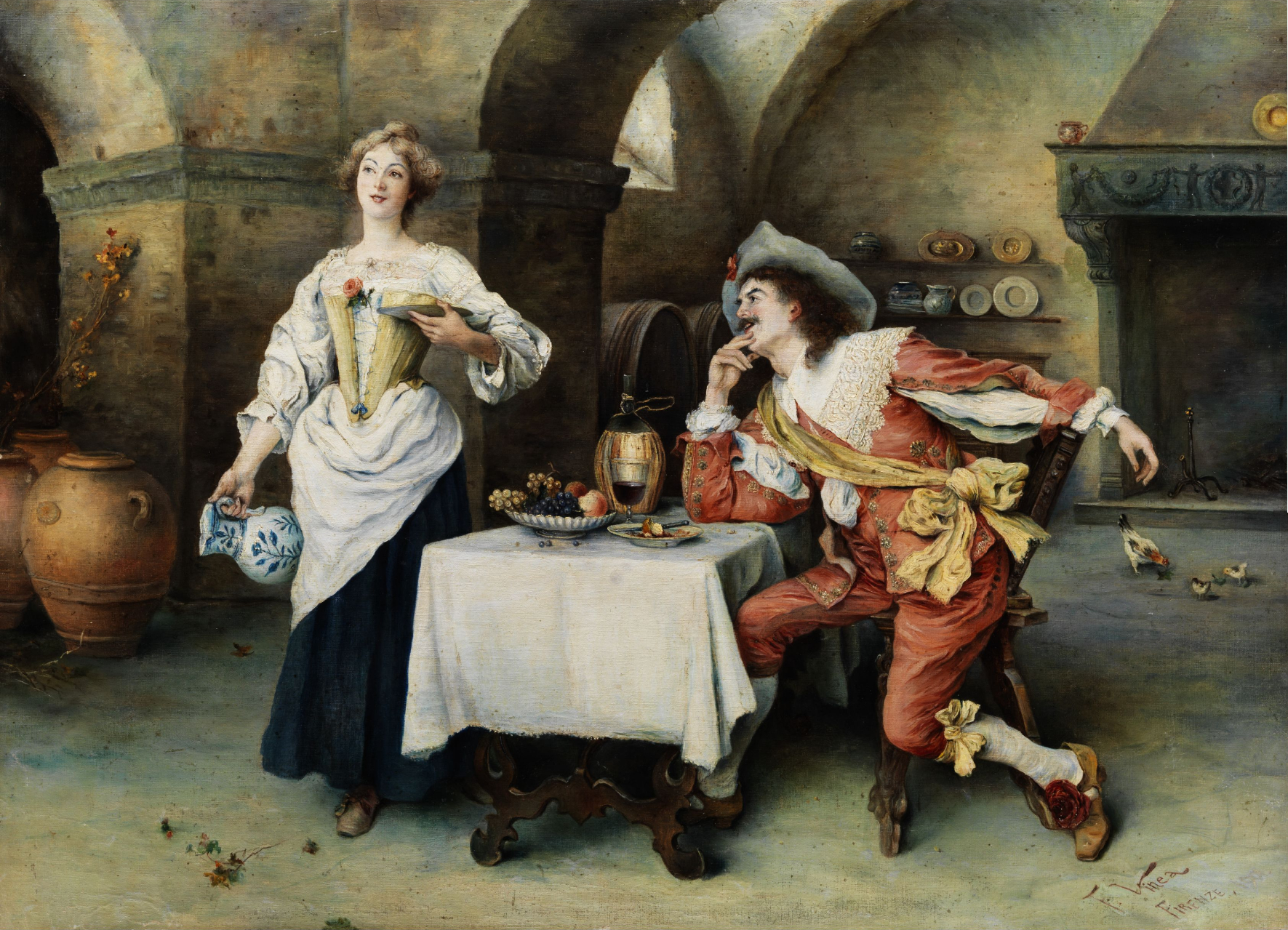

He was born in Forlì. He studied first at the Academy of Fine Arts of Florence, but had to discontinue his studies due to his poverty, and spent some time traveling without home. He worked for a photographer, also as a designer of illustrated magazines, but returned to Florence and studied under professor Enrico Pollastrini, but only for a year.

Vinea was not inclined to the erudite historical or literary paintings, or earnest depictions of natural scenes, favored by some academic contemporaries. He meddled in an imaginative, often raffish or coquettish, and always elegant depictions of dramas in elegant period costume occurring in equally ornamented interiors. The paintings proved popular in England and France, and Vinea gained a comfortable living. His studio on boulevard Prince Eugene in Florence is depicted as hoard of exotic items, and eclectic furniture and decorative items: a collection easily finding his way as ornaments of his paintings. Gubernatis describes his studio as his best work of art. The ceiling painted in tempera with Olympic gods, in allegory to the fine arts, and his collected items haphazardly stored.

Gubernatis describes his subject matter as:

Nothing serious, nothing solid, no classical concepts, not robust, no lofty ideas, no deep thoughts. His canvases, like the genre paintings of Meissonier, are well-designed witticisms, smiling color, interiors full of life and of panache, costume scenes preening with grace and trivial levity: everything exudes the fashion of the past salons. Once you have accepted the genre, Vinea is no doubt that the few who treat it with fertility of imagination, careful study of detail and splendor of the palette. The subjects of his canvases fade from memory like iridescent soap bubbles flit from our vision.

Among his works Baccanale di soldati and a woman in a canteen titled Alla più bella; La visita alla nonna; Un rapimento; Una bagnante; Il Vescovo; and Un appuntamento.

With regards to Vinea, who he grouped in thematic to Tito Conti and Edoardo Gelli, the contemporary American art collector James Jackson Jarves said :

His sentiment is unrefined and extremely realistic, going, like his strokes of brush, without equivocations or apologetic disguises, directly to his point. In composition his range is limited and studio-nurtured – mainly free and jovial topics that delight in glancing bits of contrasting color and action, and bric-a-brac displays.

Vinea died on October 22, 1902, in Florence.

== Gallery ==
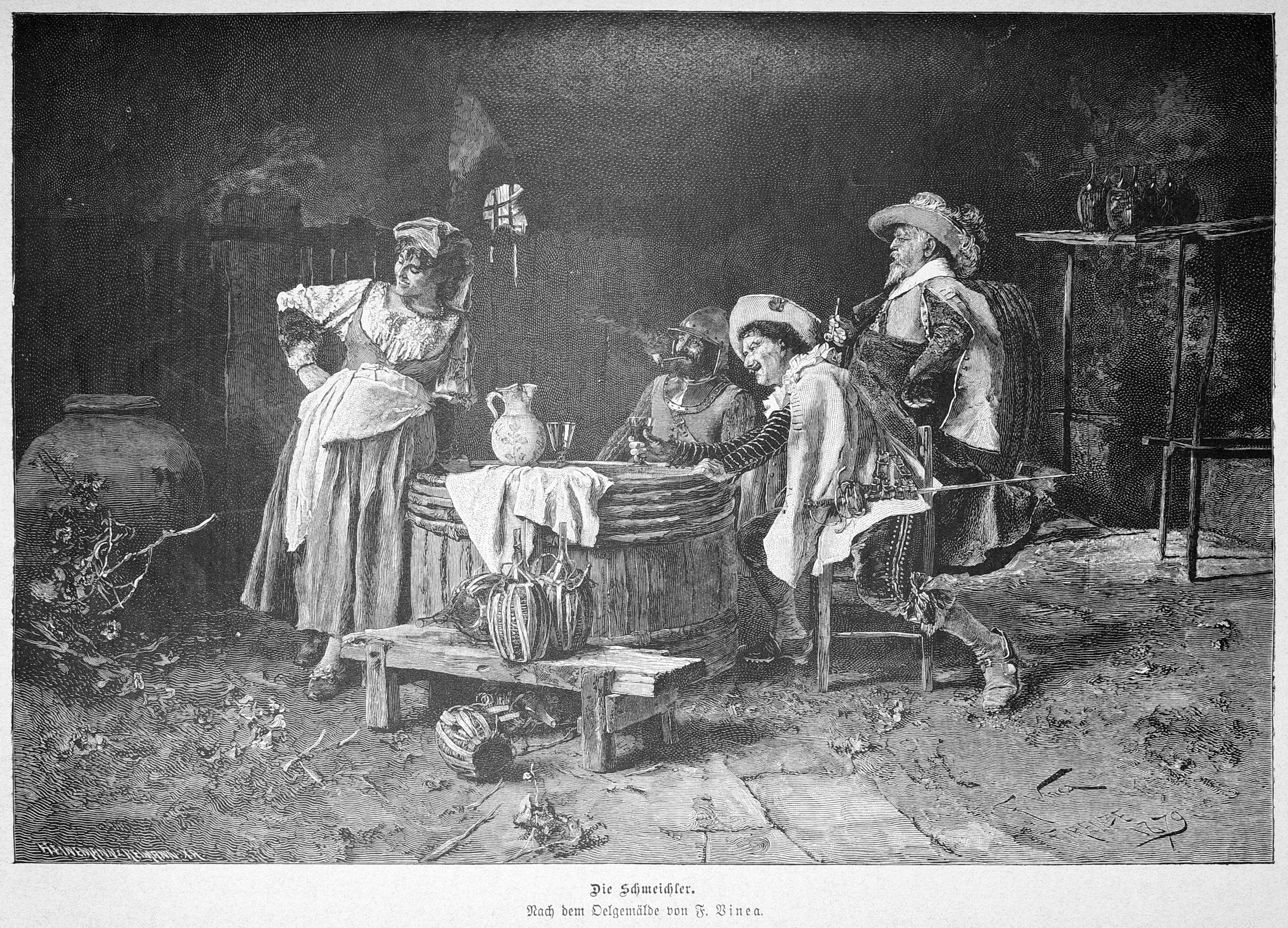

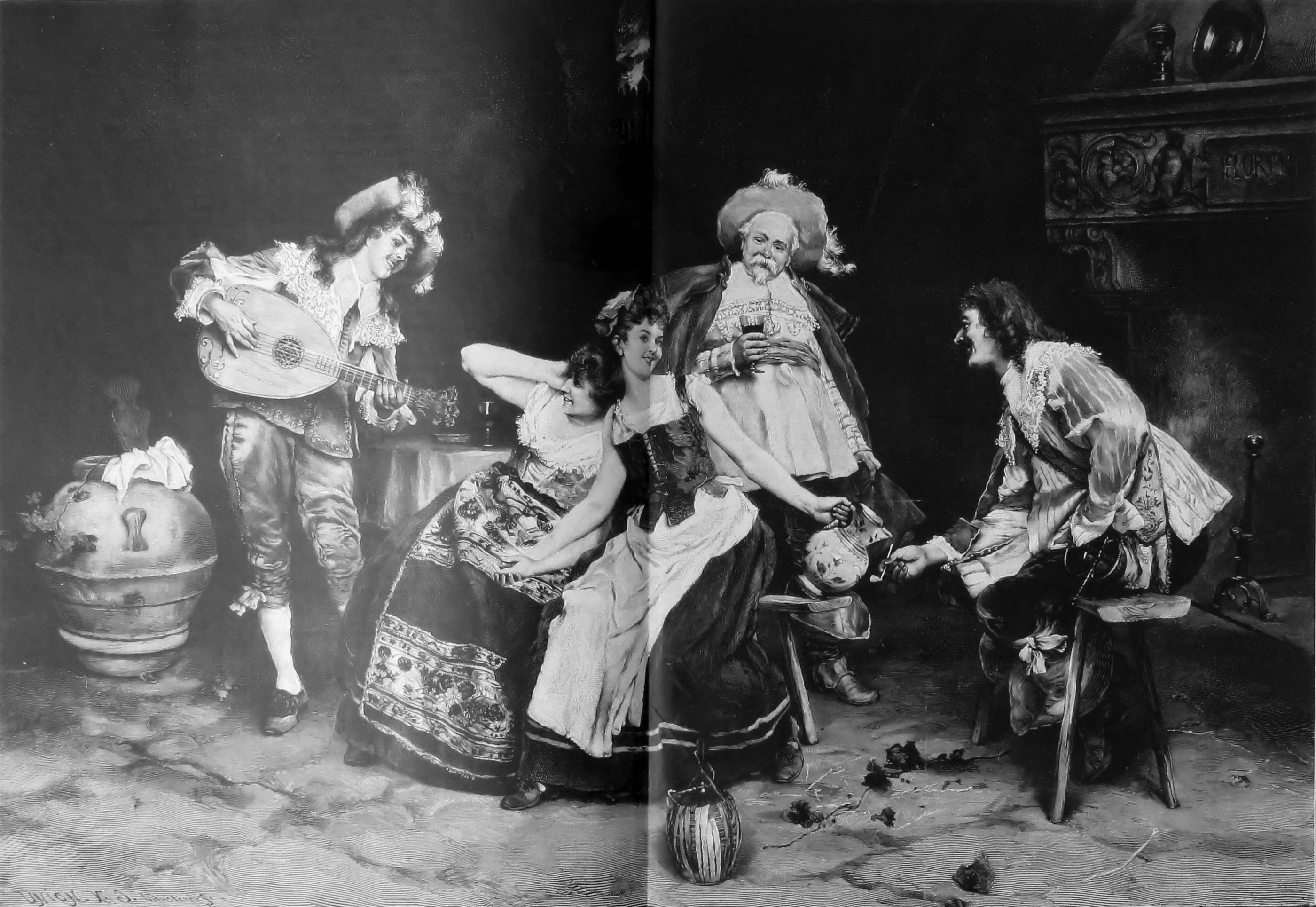

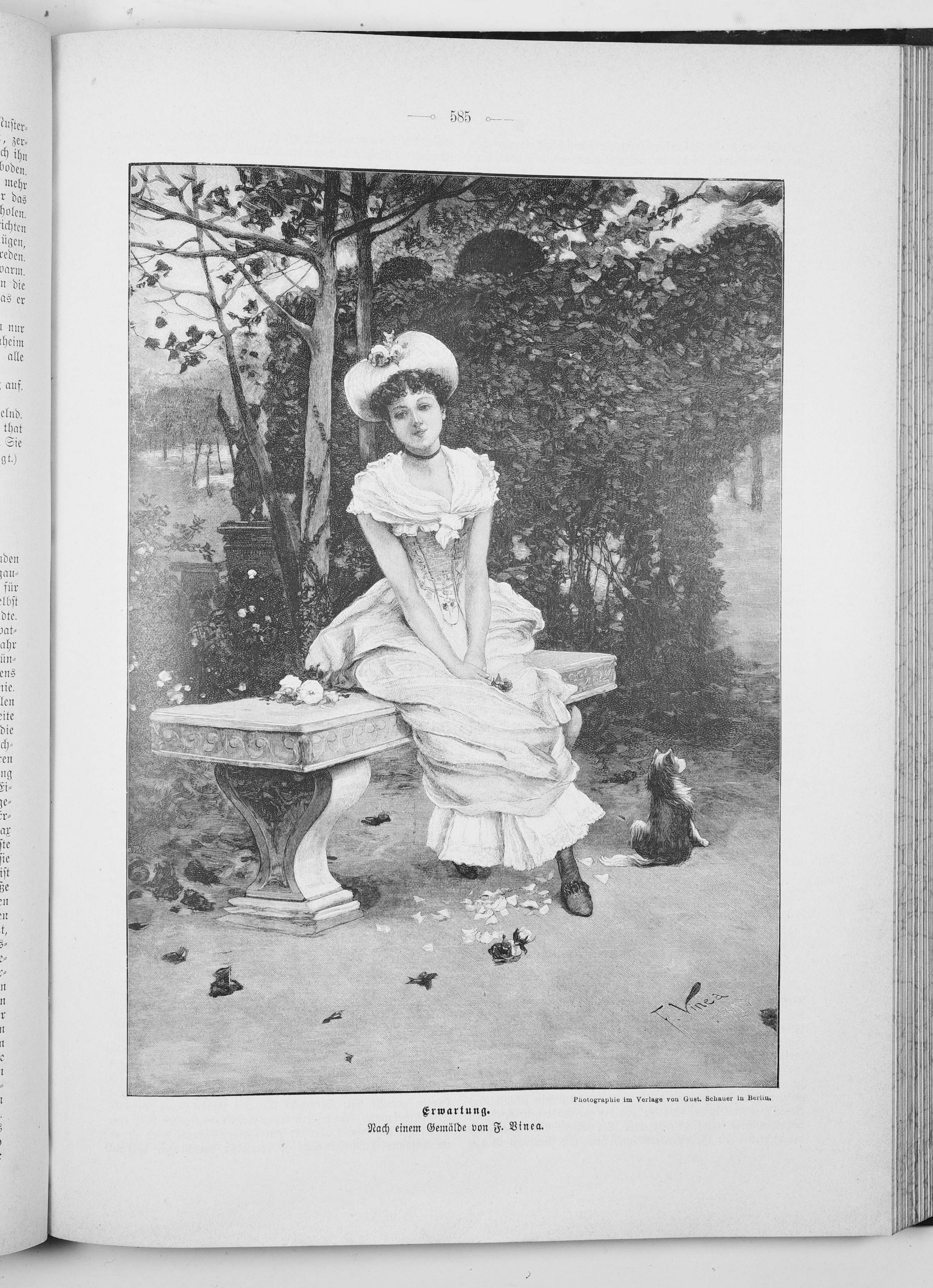

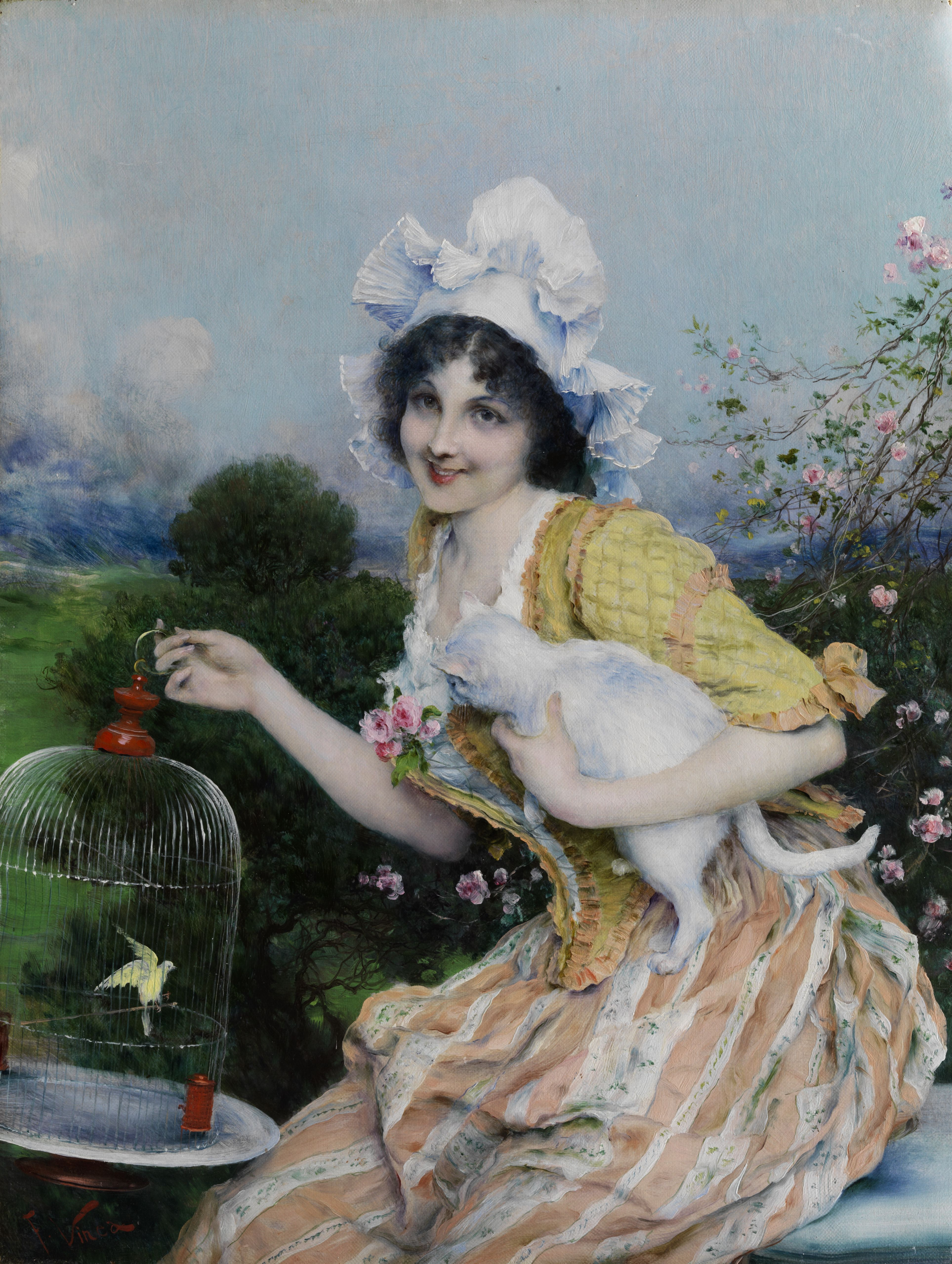

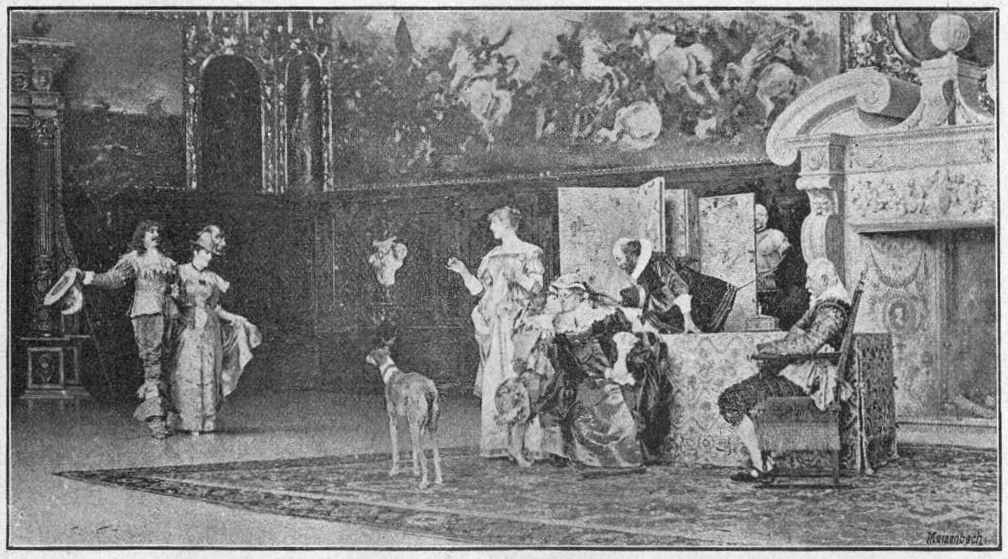

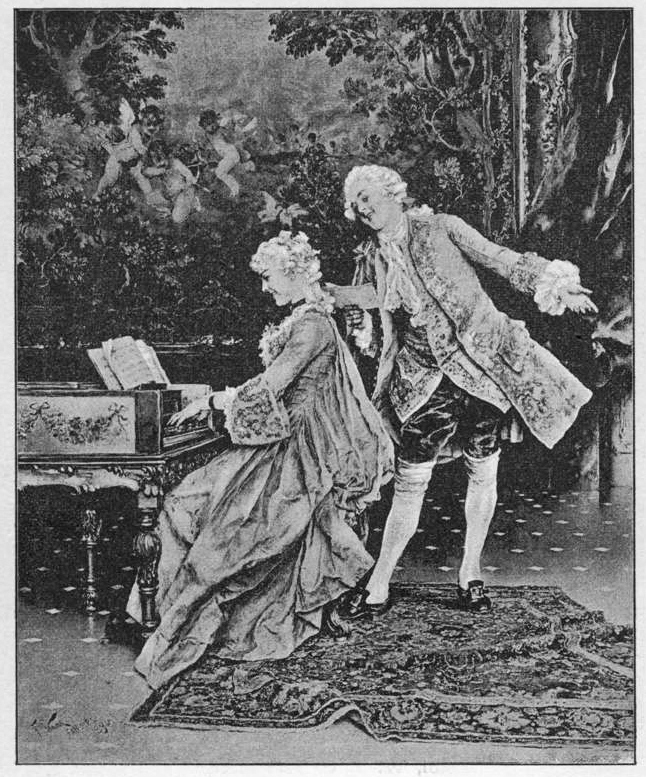

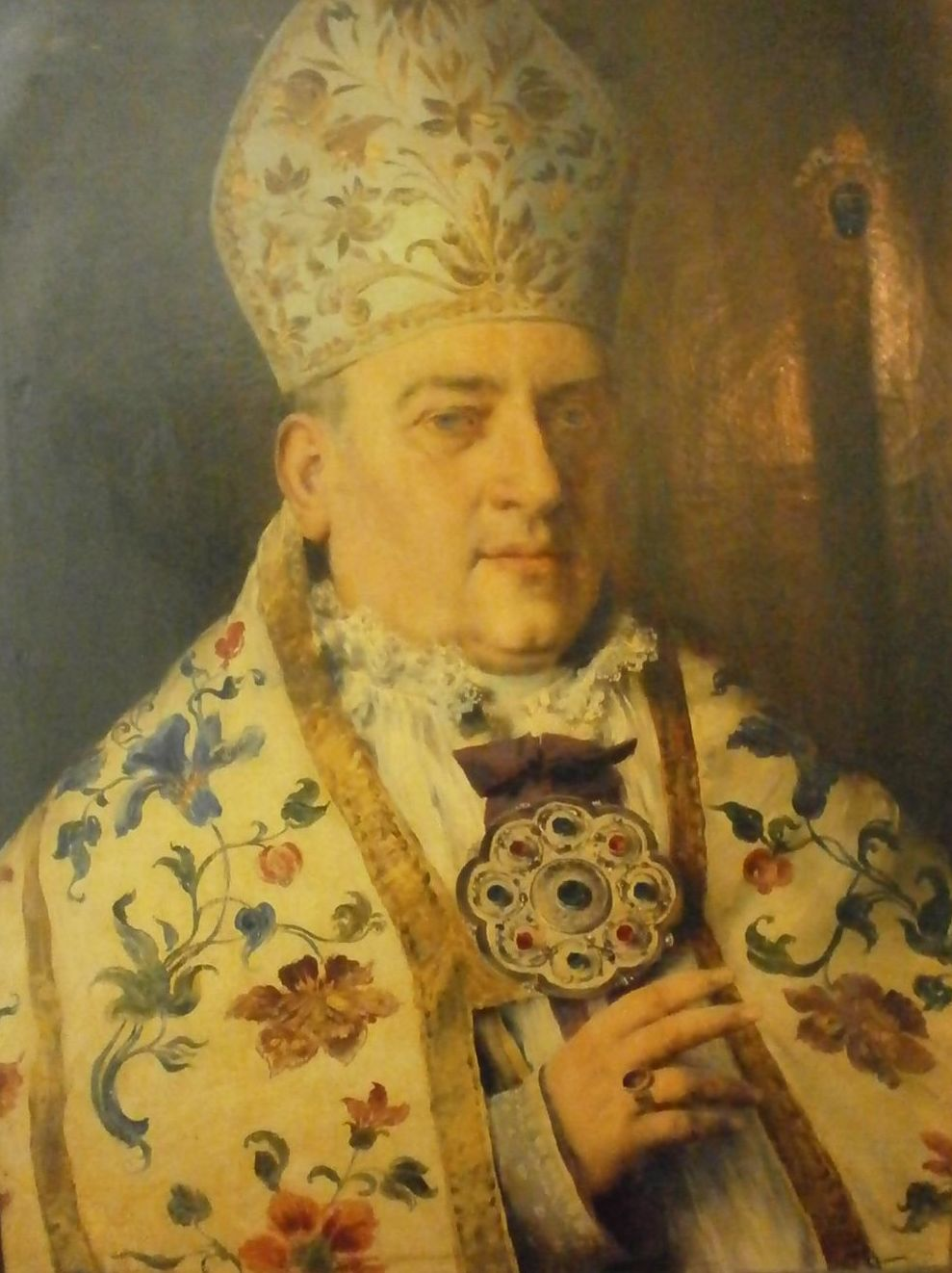

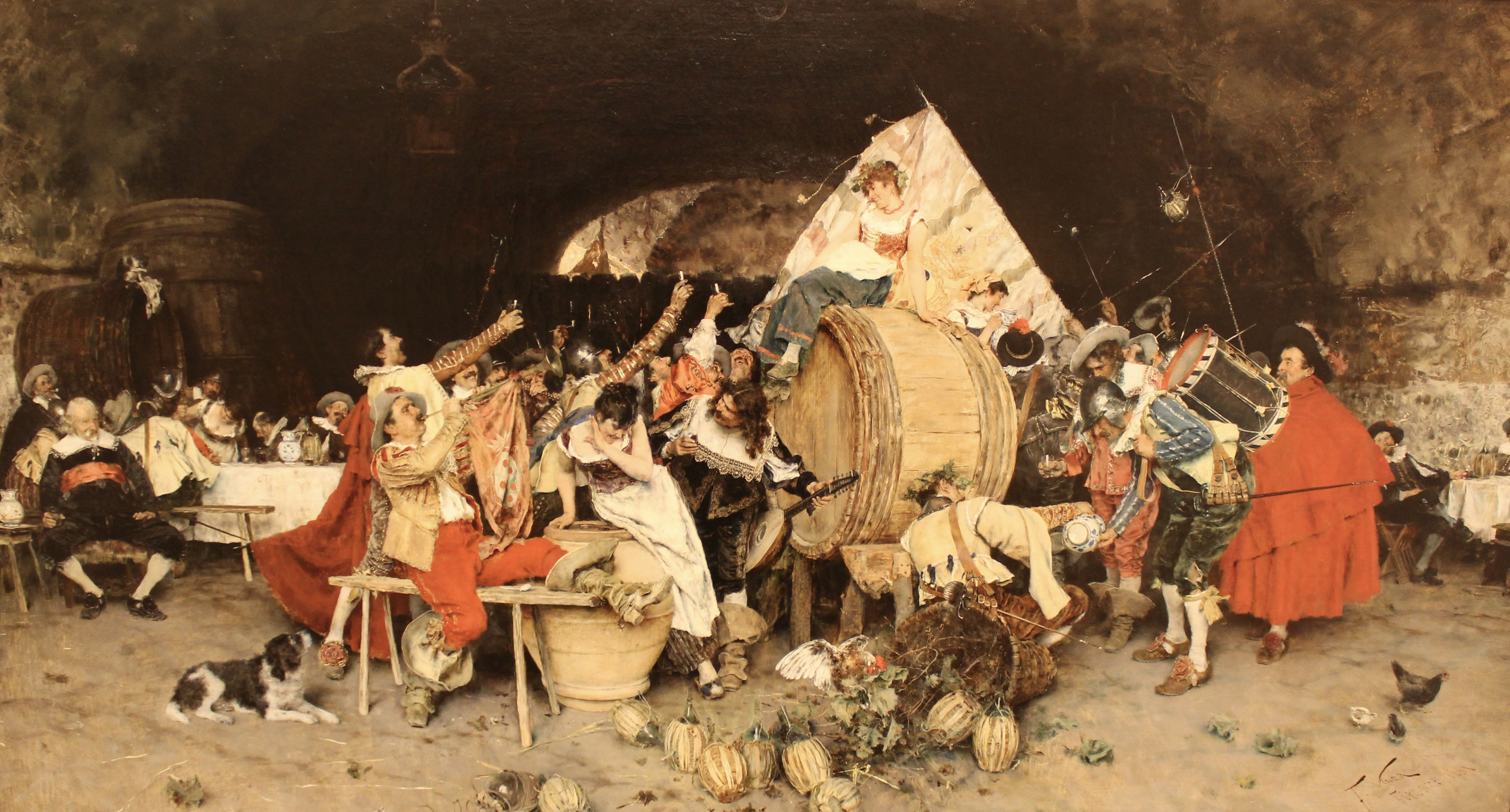
