= Gelli, Pembrokeshire =

Village in Pembrokeshire, Wales

Coordinates: 51.842°N 4.785°W

Gelli
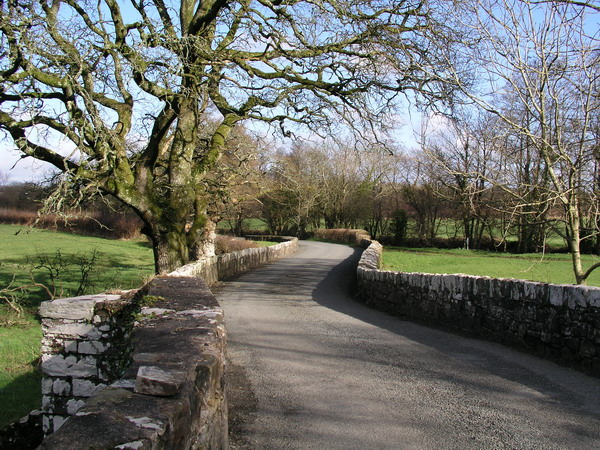
- Gelli bridge

- Location within Pembrokeshire
- OS grid reference: SN082196
- Community: Llawhaden
- Principal area: Pembrokeshire
- Country: Wales
- Sovereign state: United Kingdom
- Post town: Narberth
- Police: Dyfed-Powys
- Fire: Mid and West Wales
- Ambulance: Welsh
- UK Parliament: Carmarthen West and South Pembrokeshire

Gelli is a small settlement in the community and parish of Llawhaden, Pembrokeshire, Wales, at the confluence of the Syfynwy and Cleddau Ddu rivers. It is 3 miles (5 km) northwest of Narberth and 8 miles (13 km) east of Haverfordwest. The nearest railway station is at Clunderwen 2 miles (3 km) to the east. There was a woollen mill in Gelli that ceased production in 1938.

== Bridges ==
Gelli Bridge, immediately to the east of Gelli, spans the Syfynwy a few yards before it joins the Eastern Cleddau and is Grade II listed; it is listed twice (with different IDs and dates) because it falls within two parishes. This listed bridge is not to be confused with several other bridges in the vicinity which carry road and rail across the Eastern Cleddau and another tributary.

== Chapel ==
Siloam Welsh Baptist Church is in the centre of the hamlet. It was built in 1858 and rebuilt in 1904.
