= Gellis =

Gellis is a surname. It may refer to:

- Roberta Gellis (1927–2016), American writer of historical fiction, historical romance and fantasy
- Sandy Gellis (born 1940), American artist known for her artworks that depict and interpret the natural environment
- Isaac Gellis (1849–1906), one of the founders of the Eldridge Street Synagogue and the “kosher sausage king of America”

== See also ==
- Gelli (disambiguation)
