= Arturo Ricci =

Italian painter

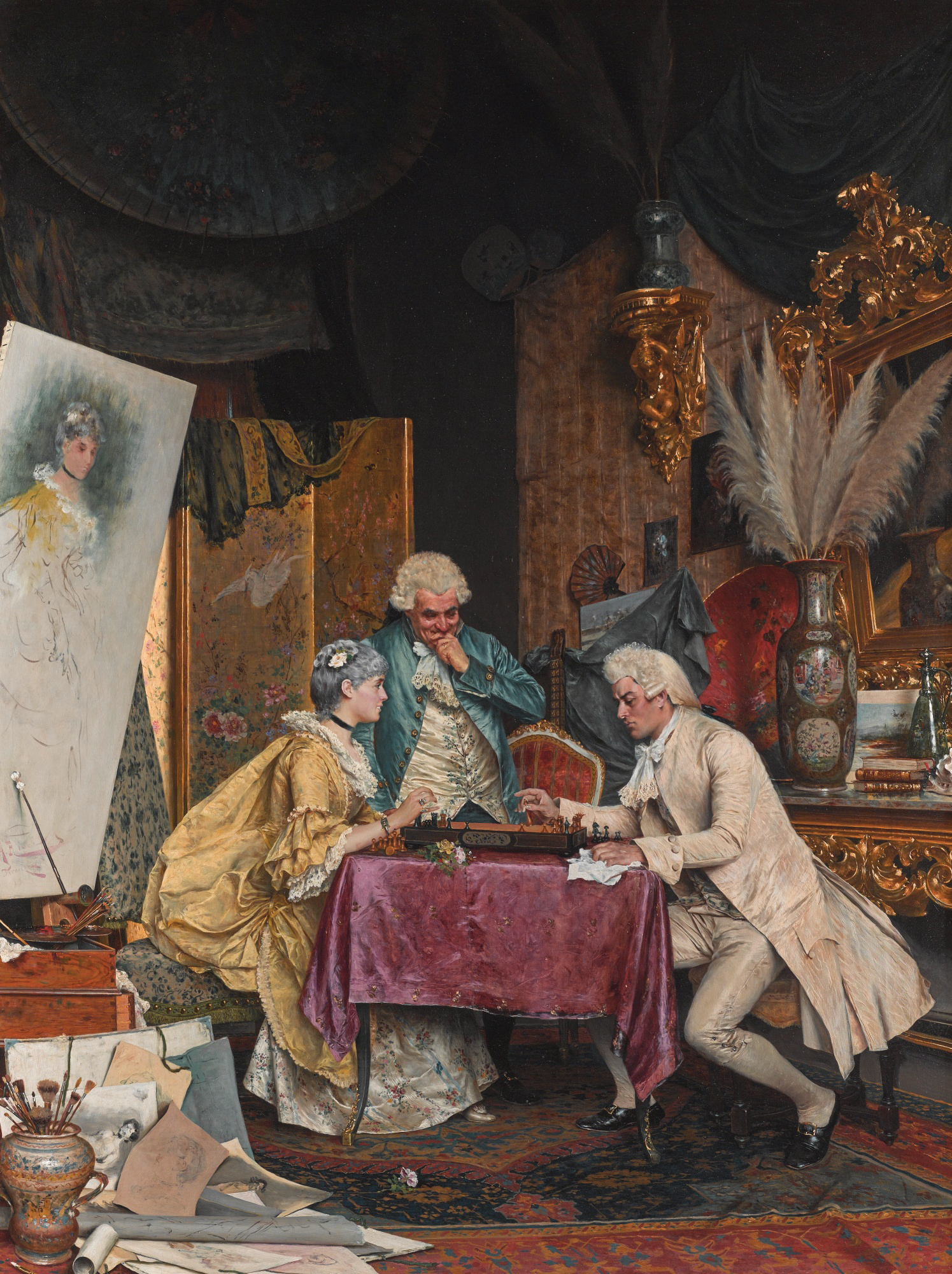
Sala artistica (1884)

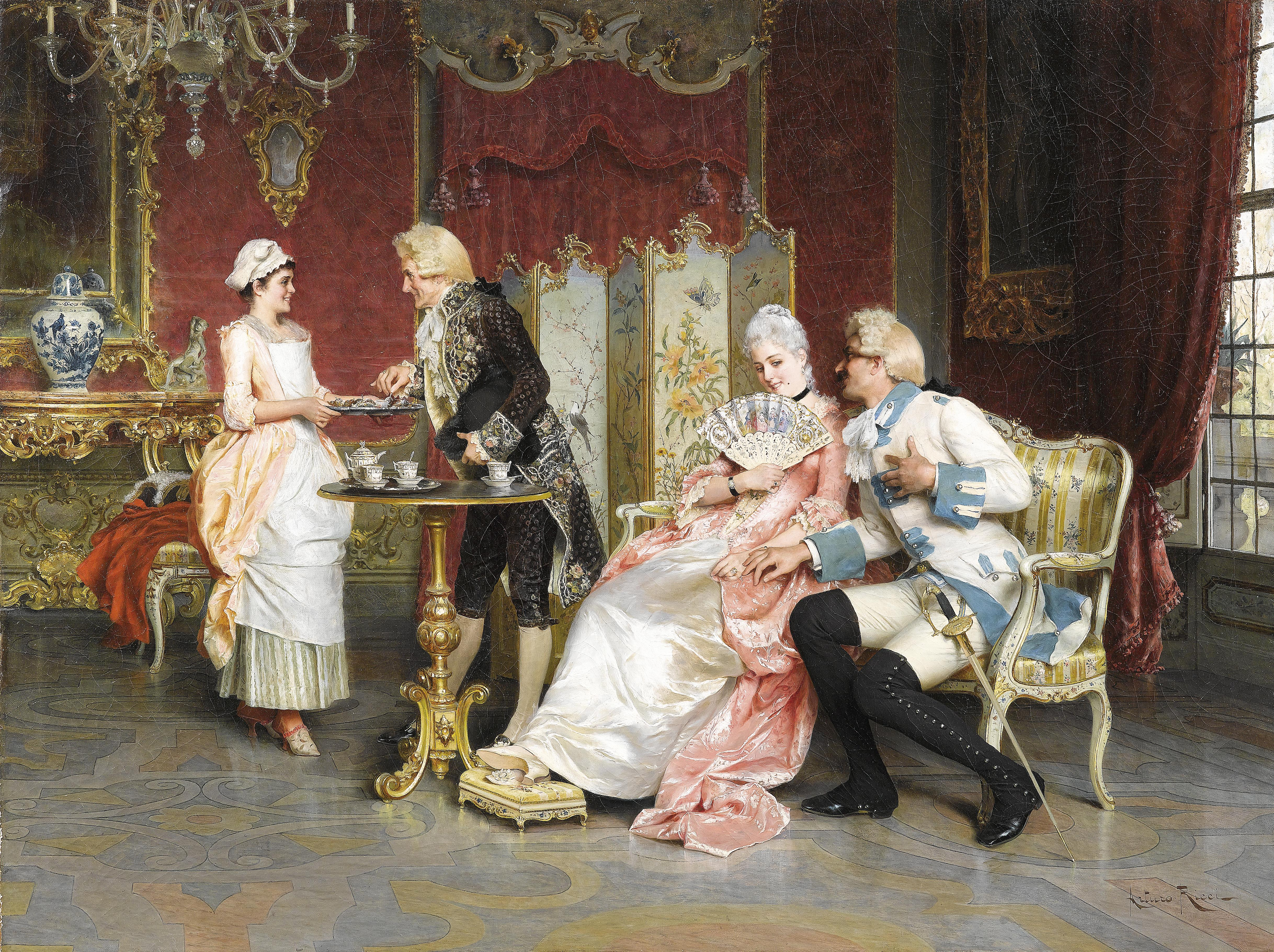
Afternoon tea, by 1919

Arturo Ricci (1854−1919) was an Italian painter, known for his figurative subjects, genre scenes, and art of family life. Historical genre, most particularly eighteenth century subjects, perceived as a golden age of elegance, sophistication, and taste, prior to the harsh realities of the Industrial Revolution. The wealthy class created by the Industrial Revolution collected his genre of art, specifically the representation of the pre-Industrial era.

Ricci specialized in anecdotal scenes of elegant family life, a world of rustling silks and shimmering satins, displaying the virtuosity of his highly finished detail, composition and sense of colour. Working in Florence, Ricci's paintings appealed not only to Italians but to those on ‘The Grand Tour’, particularly collectors in Britain and the United States, Andrew Carnegie, of steel fame and wealth, owned Ricci's “The Village Wedding”.

== Biography ==
Arturo Ricci was born on 19 April 1854 in Florence. Aged 15 he entered the Accademia di Belle Arti di Firenze where he studied under Tito Conti (1842-1924). Painting figurative subjects, genre scenes and scenes from family life, Ricci soon established himself as one of the foremost artists in Europe in the field of historical costume genre, alongside Vittorio Reggianini (1858-1939) and Frédéric Soulacroix (1858-1933).

Among his works: Veduta di Viareggio; Il Ciabattino; Il pranzo di nozze; Il fanatico per la musica; La visita alla figlia; L'ultima lettera amorosa; Risposta all'ultima lettera amorosa; Ritorno dalla guerra; Il pranzo di nozze; and Il Ritorno degli sposi dalla Chiesa.

== Gallery ==
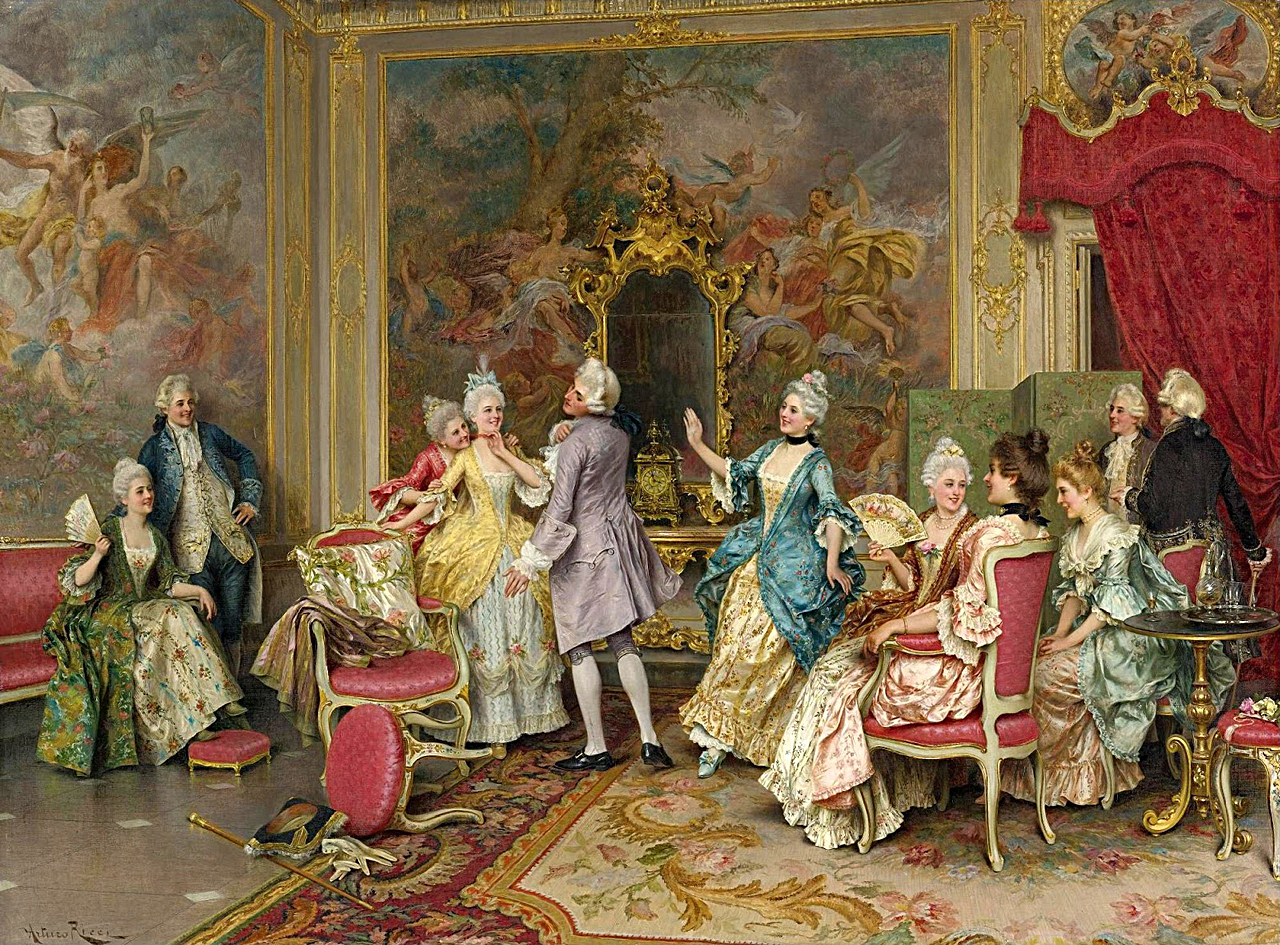

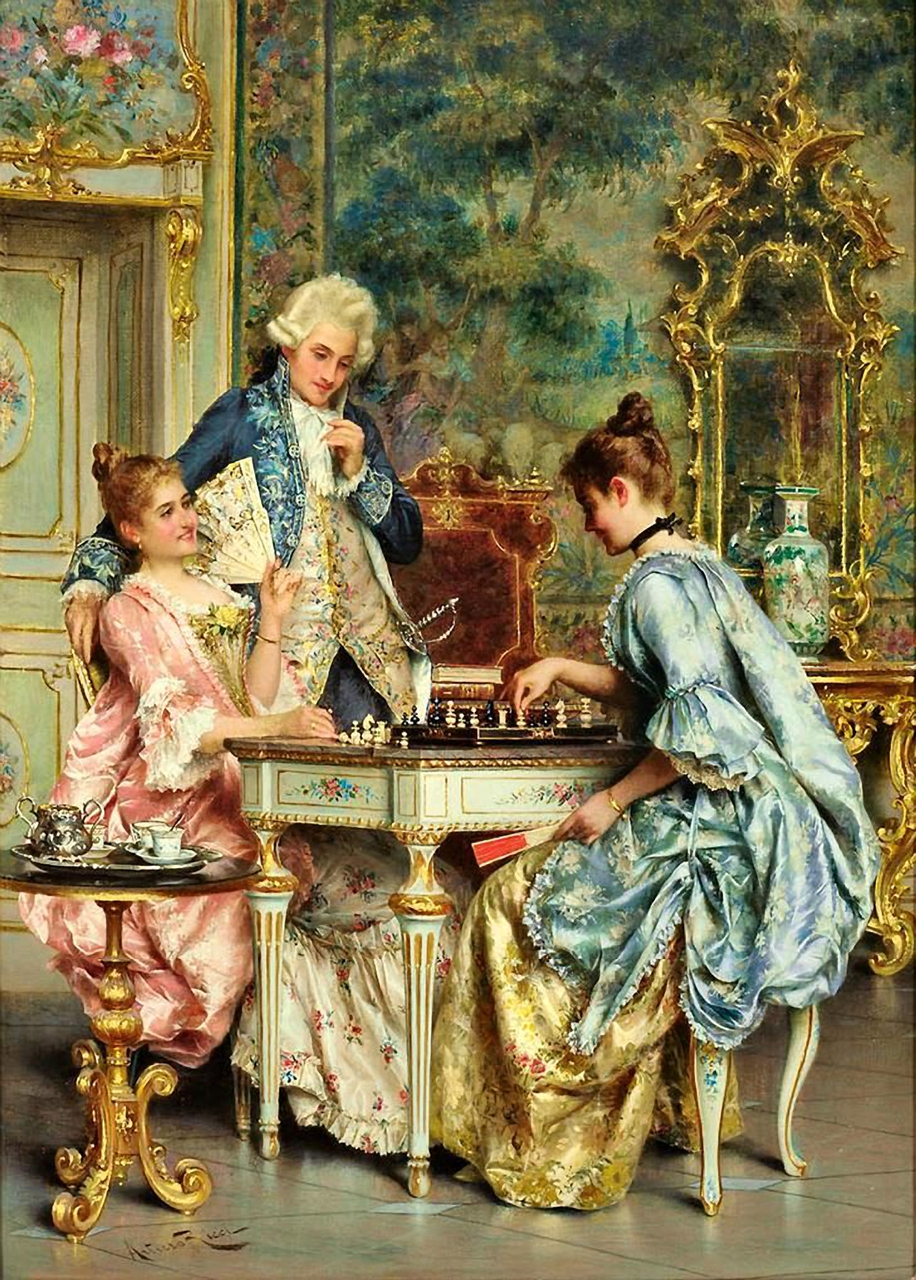
Playing Chess

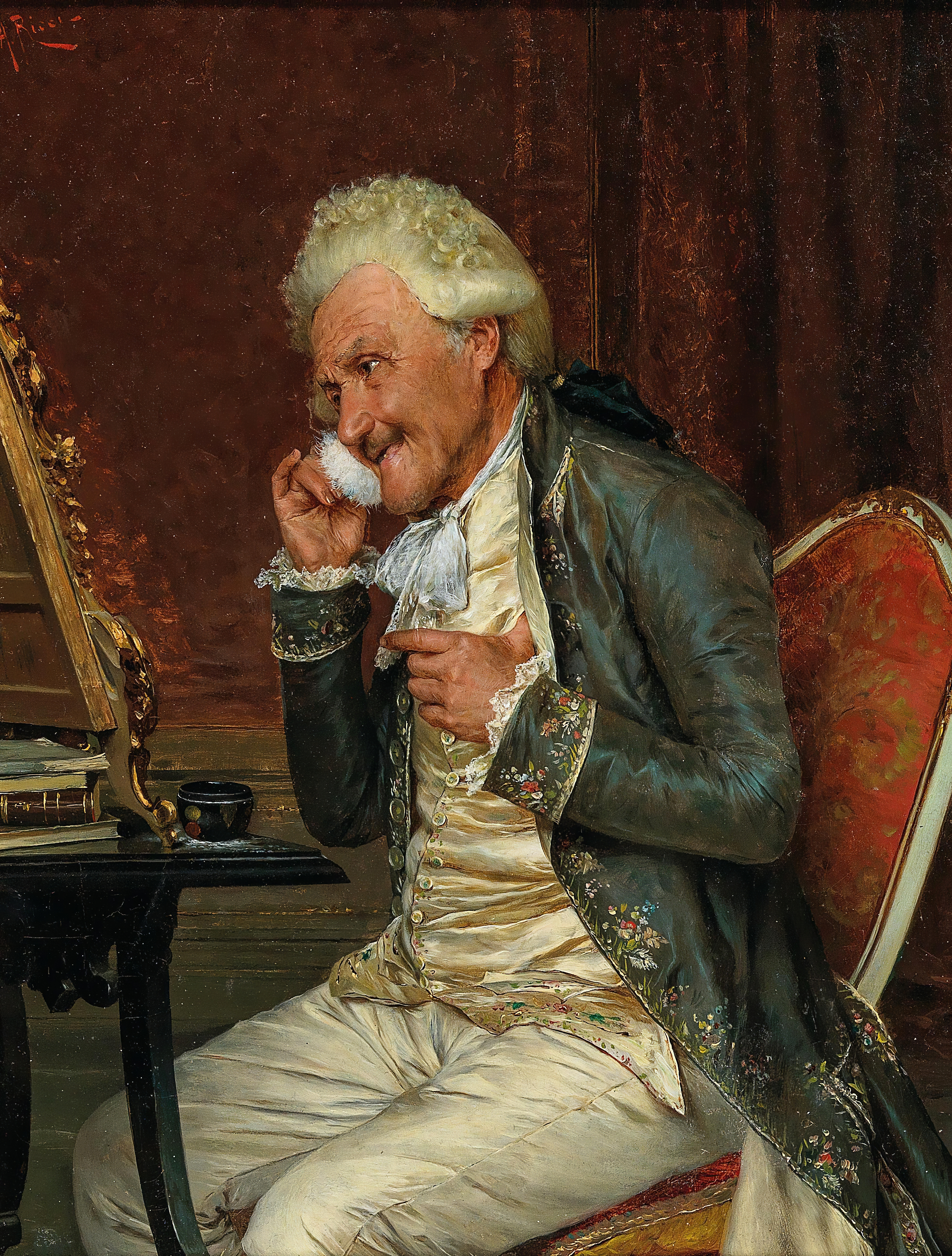
Powder Puff

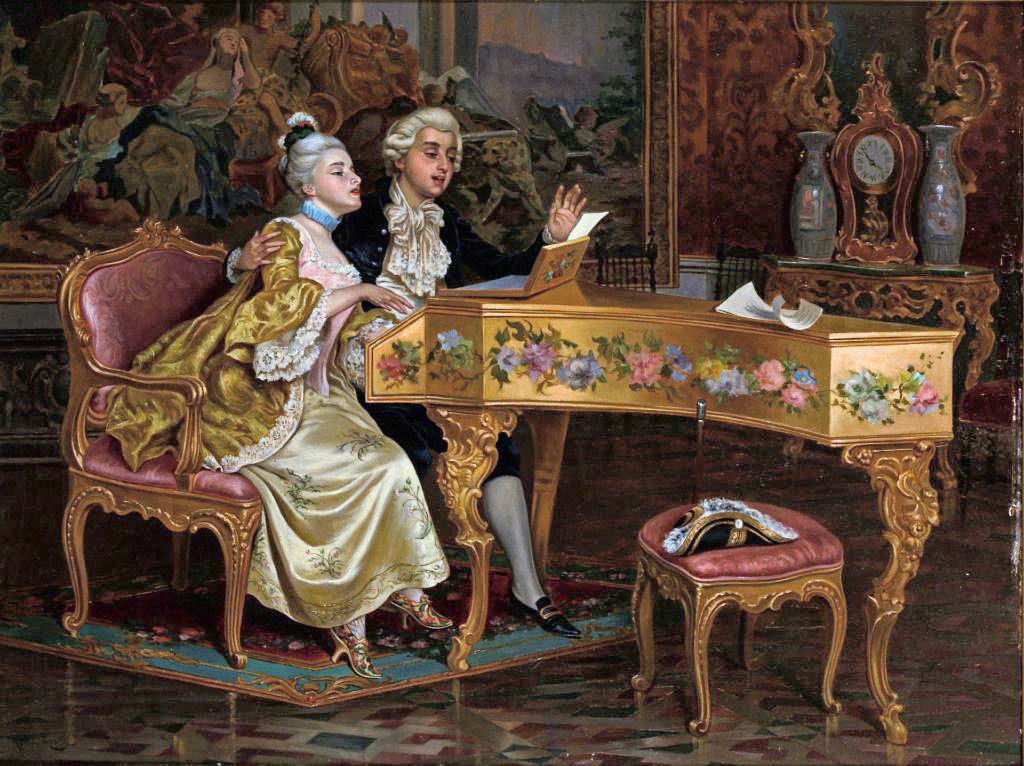
The Music Lesson
