= Tito Conti =

Italian painter (1842–1924)

Tito Conti (1842–1924) was an Italian painter, mainly of genre costume or historical subjects.

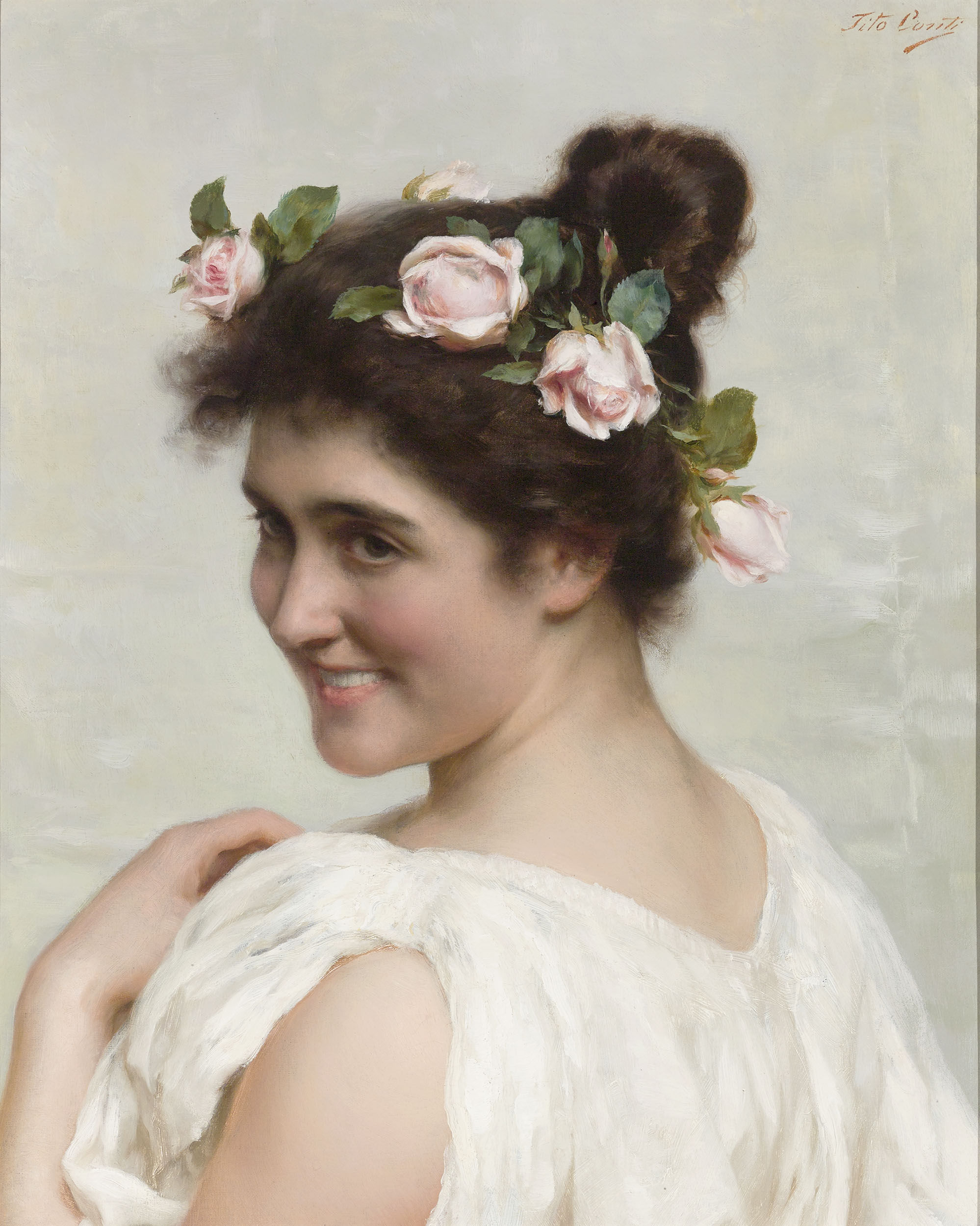
An Italian Beauty by Tito Conti. Circa 1880

== Biography ==
He was born and lived in Florence, where he studied at the Institute of Fine Arts.

He was resident professor at the Academic College of Fine Arts of Florence. Among his works are: La Presentazione; Il quarto d'ora di Rabelais e La musica (1876); Il brindisi alla bettoliera; L'addio; Portrait of his wife; Il sospetto; Il Cantastorie; Il Moschettiere; and Per la passeggiata (1886, Florence). Among his pupils was Arturo Ricci.

With regards to Conti, who he grouped in thematic to Francesco Vinea and Edoardo Gelli, the contemporary American art collector James Jackson Jarves described him relative to the other two as showing "more refinement and higher artistic culture". While praising his "painting of tapestried backgrounds, ornate furniture, and elaborate details", he also disparaged the thematic, saying: "He paints too well for his subject. If his creative faculty were equal to his execution, he would be the first painter of his day."

== Gallery ==
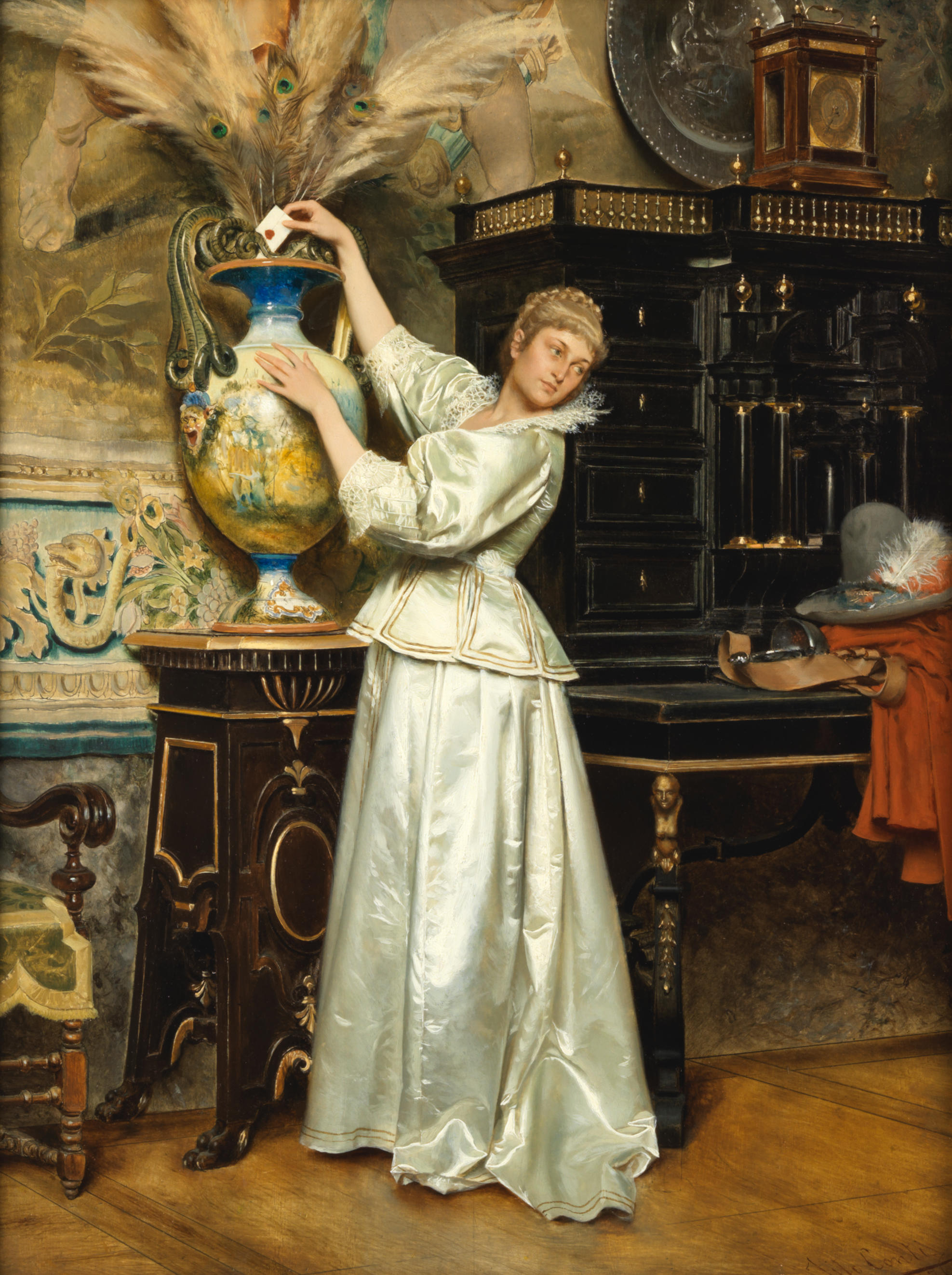
The Secret Postbox, 1876

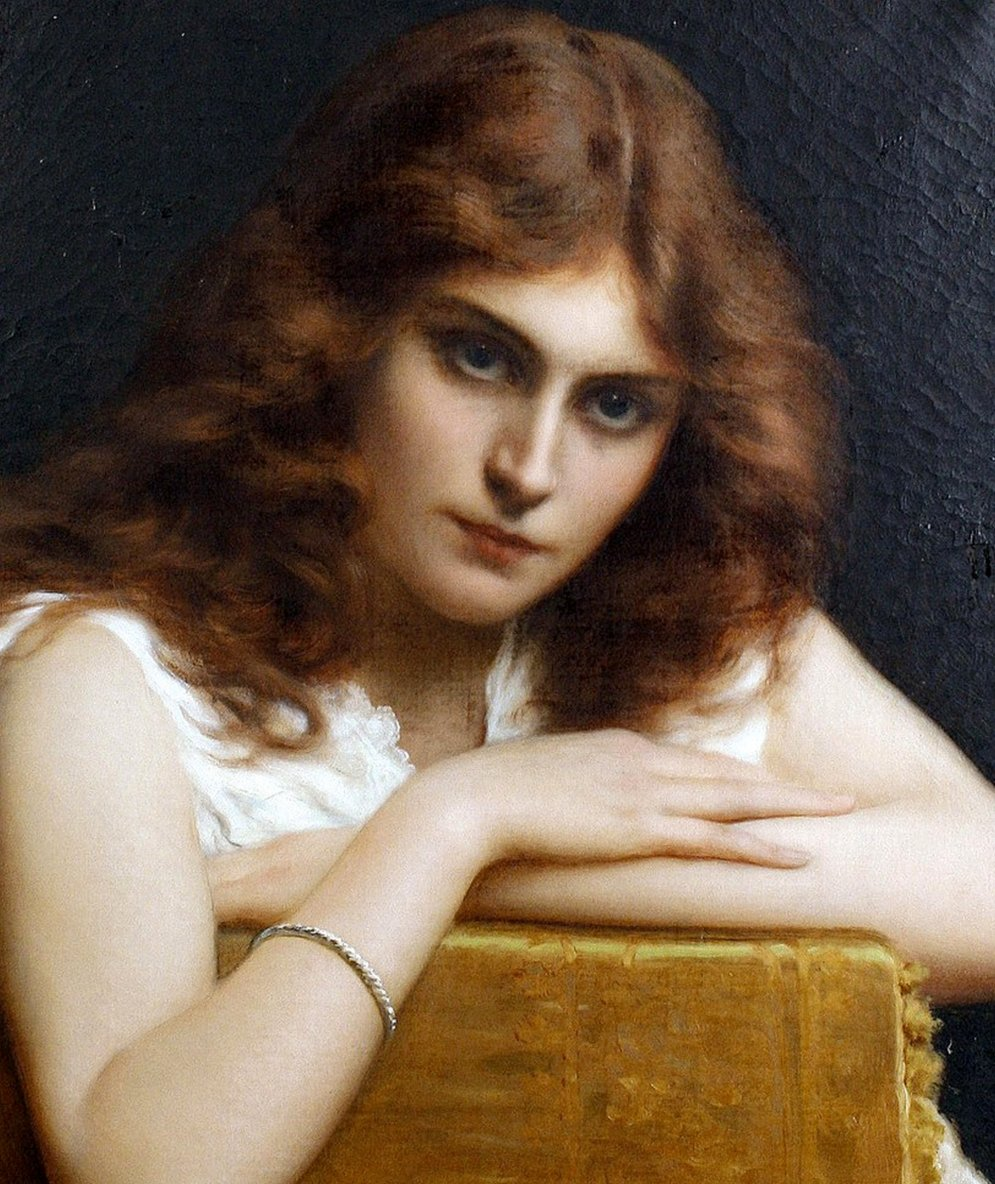
Girl with auburn hair

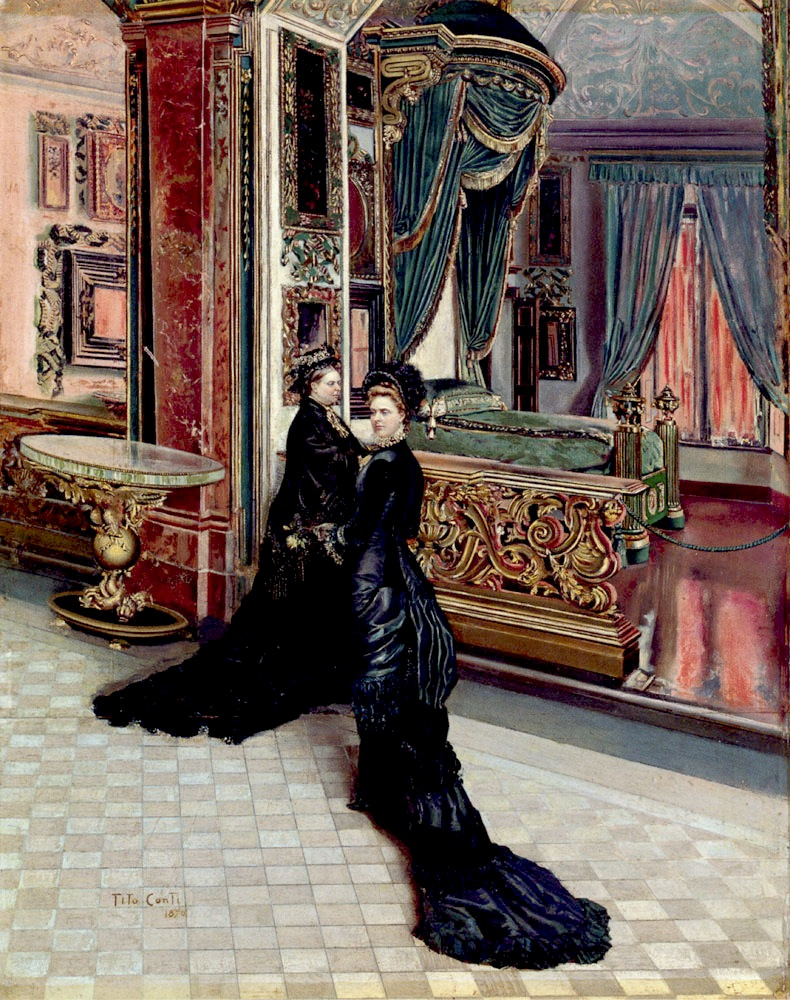
Queen Victoria and her eldest daughter Vicky, German Crown Princess visit Napoleon's boudoir, 1879

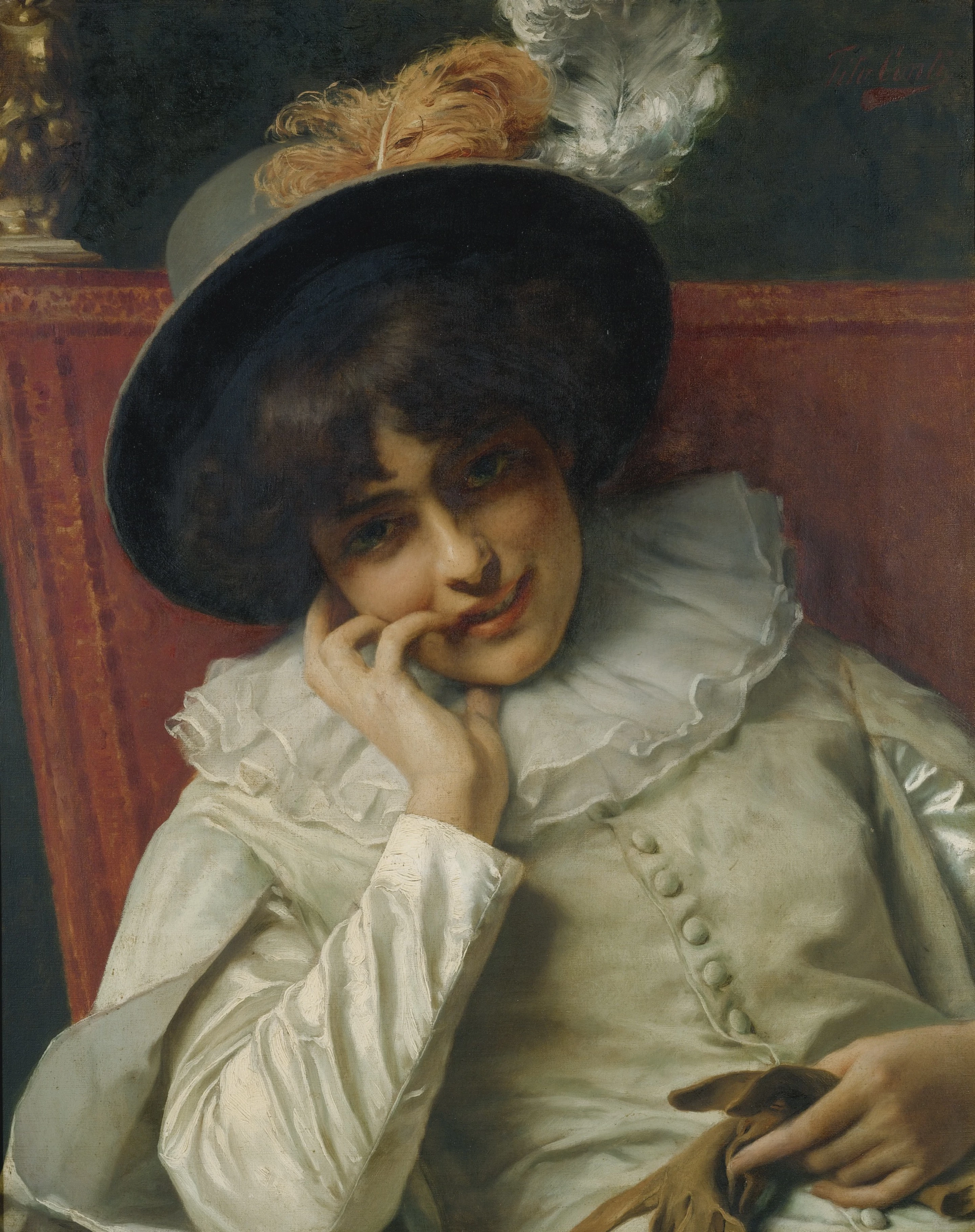
A pleasant reflection

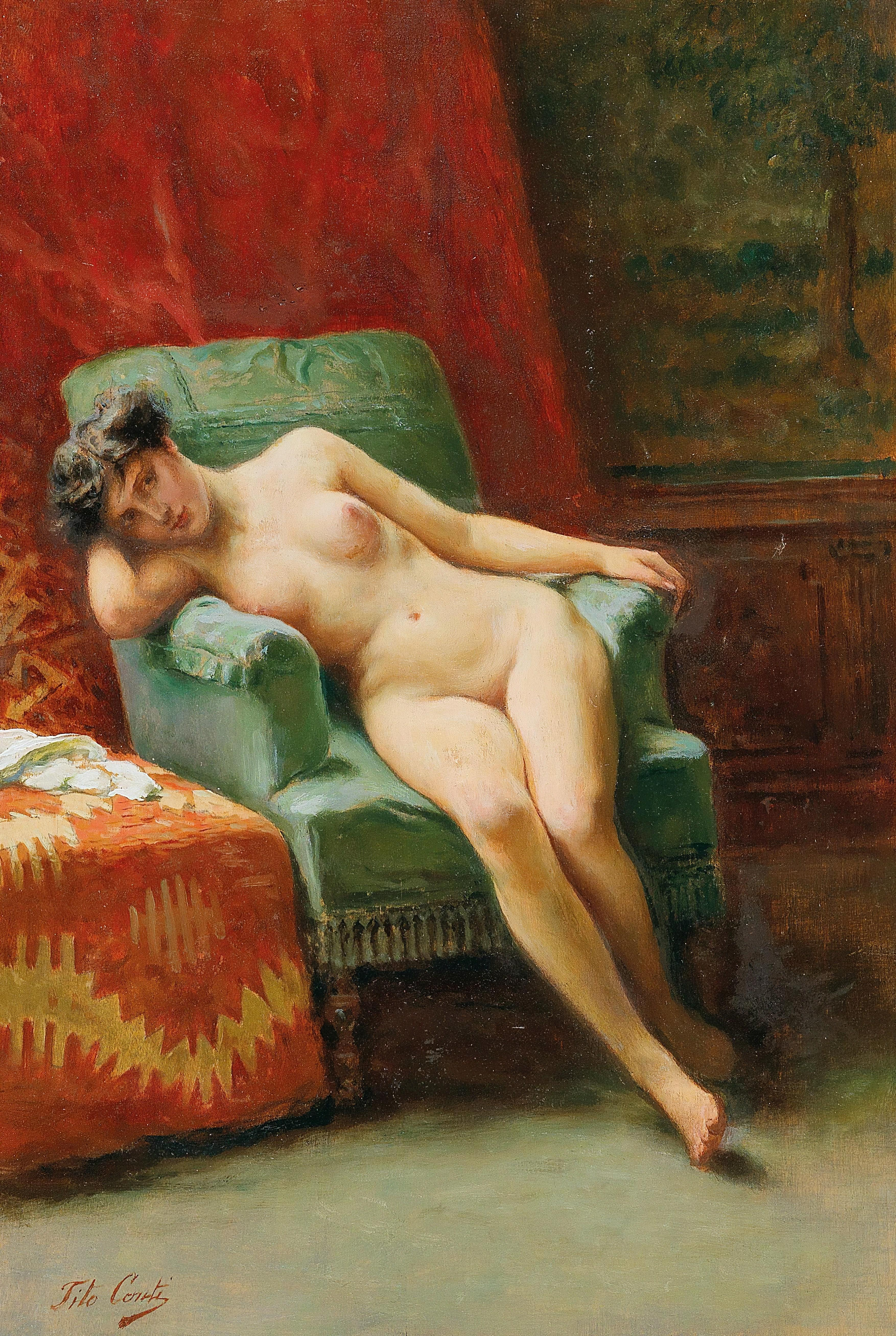
The model
