= Edoardo Gelli =

Italian painter

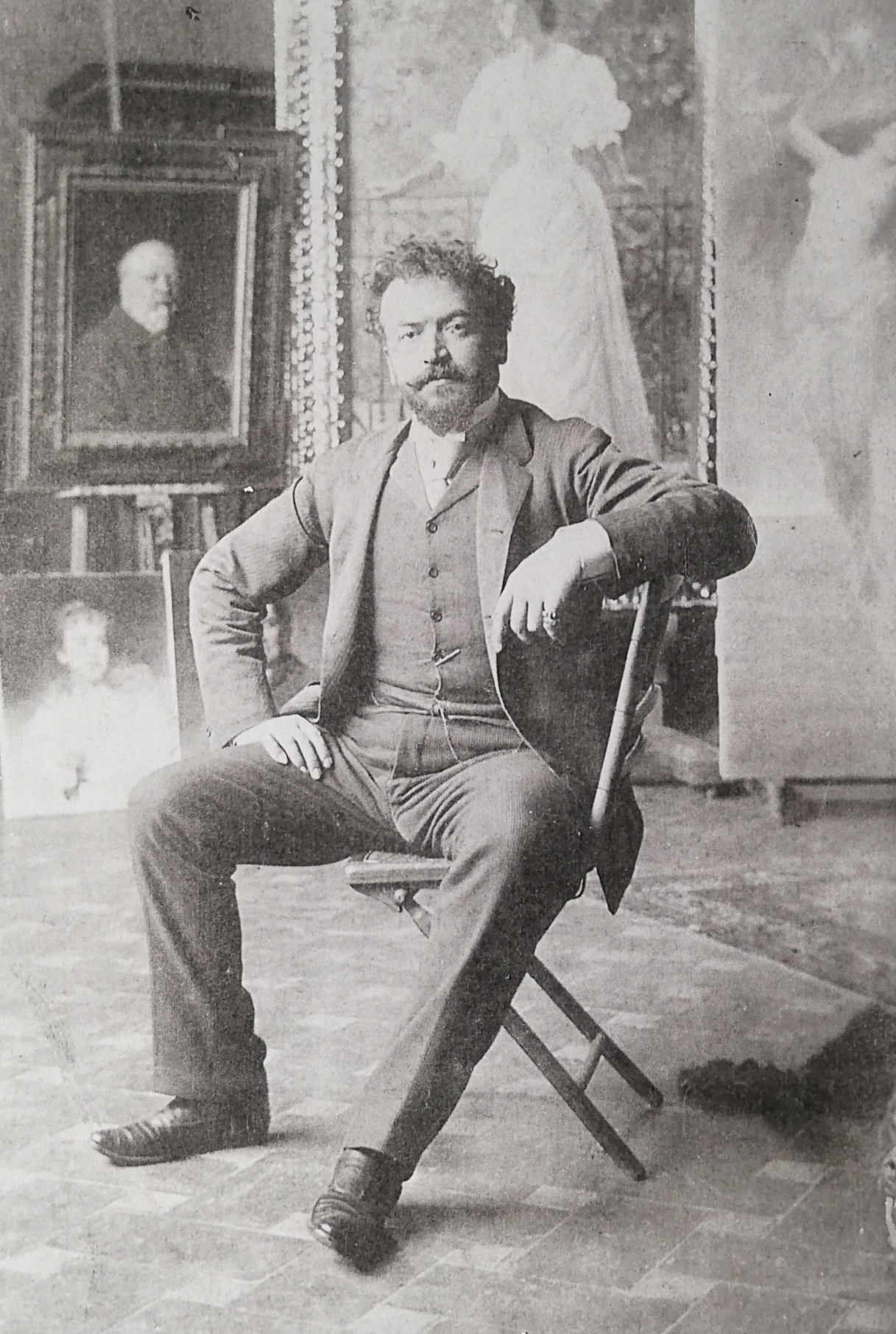
- Edoardo Gelli in his art studio, ca. 1888
- Born: September 4, 1851; Savona
- Died: March 30, 1933; Florence
- Resting place: Soffiano
- Spouse: Ida Marchesini
- Parents: Antonio Gelli (father); Marina Dall’Orso (mother)

Edoardo Gelli, also known as Eduardo Gelli or Odoardo Gelli (4 September 1851 in Savona – 30 March 1933 in Florence), was an Italian genre and portrait painter (and later academician); active in Florence and Vienna between the end of the 19th and the start of the 20th century.

== Biography ==
Gelli was born in Savona, where his parents, Antonio Gelli (from Lucca) and Marina Dall’Orso (from Chiavari), managed the Albergo dell’Universo (later Albergo Svizzero) from 1849.

In 1862 his mother moved to Lucca to allow him to attend the Regio Istituto di Belle Arti (Royal Institute of Fine Arts), where he studied until 1871 under teachers including Carlo Dal Poggetto and Antonio Fontanesi. In 1872 he obtained a scholarship to continue his studies in Florence, where he later settled.

He trained in at the Accademia di Belle Arti di Firenze (Academy of fine arts of Florence) under Antonio Ciseri. The contemporary American art collector James Jackson Jarves grouped him with Francesco Vinea and Tito Conti, two other costume genre painters.

In 1873 he exhibited San Sebastiano, followed in 1875 by An Episode of the Massacre of the Innocents, both now preserved at Palazzo Mansi in Lucca.

During his early Florentine years, he focused on historical costume subjects such as Charles I in Van Dyck's Studio and scenes from the Thirty Years' War, alongside genre scenes often set in 18th-century or convent environments.

From the early 1880s, he devoted himself mainly to portrait painting. Notable works include portraits of Luigi Pisani (1883), Diego Martelli and Ernesto Bellandi (1884, Uffizi Galleries, Florence). In 1886 he traveled to Vienna, where he exhibited at the Künstlerhaus and gained significant success, leading to commissions from Emperor Franz Joseph I and members of the Habsburg court. He remained in Vienna until 1888.

In November 1888 he was appointed resident academician of the Accademia di Belle Arti of Florence.

After returning to Italy, he painted members of the House of Savoy, working in Monza and Rome. In 1900, a portrait of Queen Margherita was sent to the Exposition Universelle in Paris.

At the Louisiana Purchase Exposition of 1904, he displayed The Lost Chord.

Within the era of late 19th-century Florence, Gelli became a portraitist of high society.

In his studio in Via Marsilio Ficino, he painted in 1899 a large portrait of the Royal Family of Siam during their European tour, now displayed in the throne hall of the Grand Palace in Bangkok. King Rama V also commissioned him to paint the Crown Prince and purchased a number of his female nude works.

He maintained close relationships with contemporary Florentine artists, including Michele Gordigiani, Stefano Ussi, Vittorio Corcos, and the sculptor Domenico Trentacoste.

Among his sitters were aristocrats such as the Marchesa Corsi Salviati, Frederick Stibbert (1904), and Count Alfonso Litta, as well as members of the bourgeoisie and intellectuals including Renato Fucini, Telemaco Signorini, Mark Twain (1904, Henry Ford Museum), (Note: This portrait was painted to be shown at Saint Louis Exposition on "Mark Twain" Day) Antonio Puccinelli, and Giacomo Puccini, whom he portrayed twice.

Around the turn of the century, he also addressed religious themes, notably the 1902 triptych (Annunciation, Nativity, Deposition) for the church of Santa Caterina d’Alessandria in Florence.

He was active in the Società di Belle Arti and promoted exhibitions such as the Mostra dell’Arte Toscana (1905).

In 1911 he retired from artistic life and moved to Maiano, near Fiesole. He died in Florence on 30 March 1933 and was buried in Cimitero di Soffiano.

== Family ==
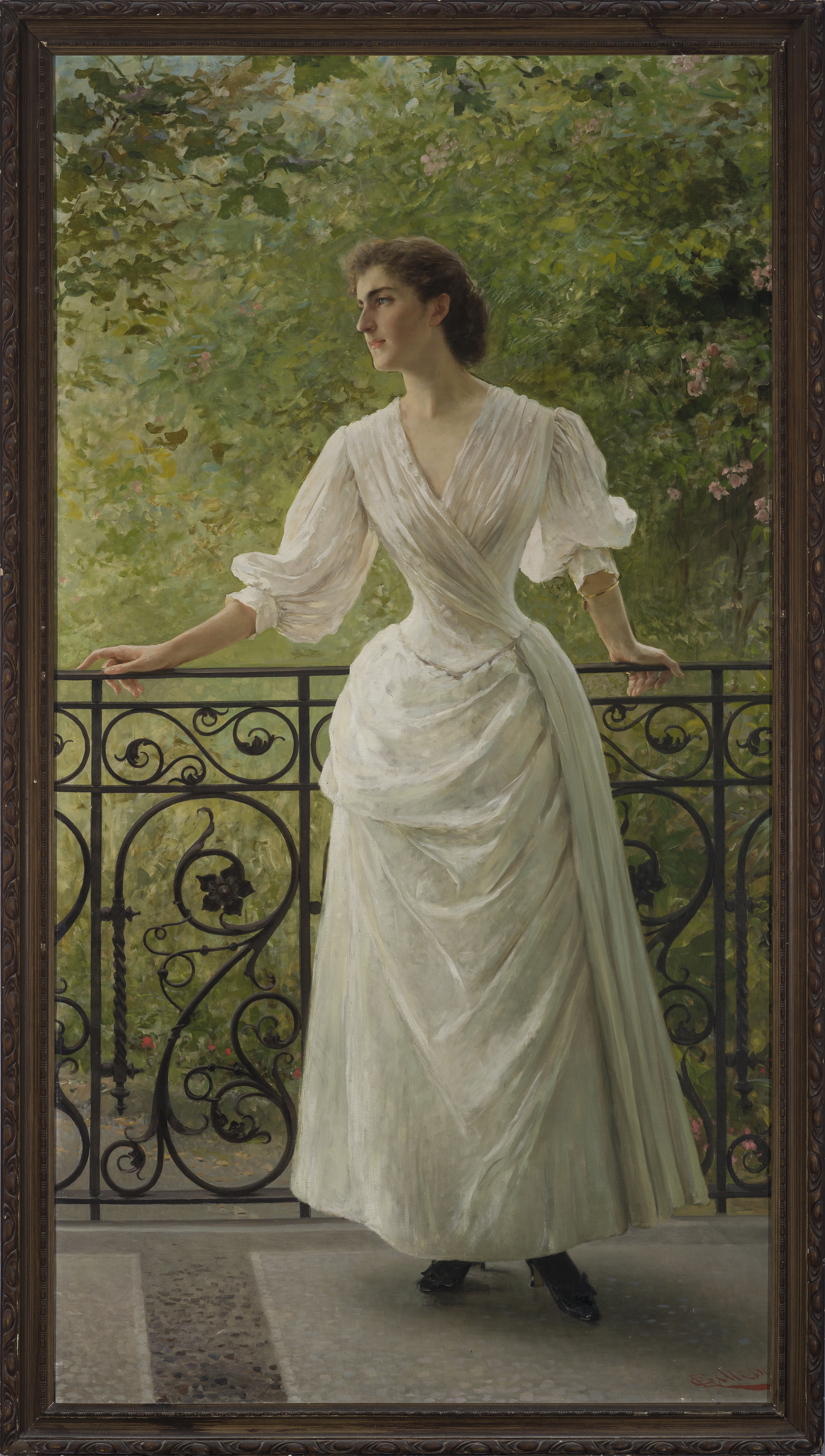
Edoardo Gelli, Ida Marchesini on the terrace (1888)

Gelli was married to Ida Marchesini (Florence, 1862–1927), a sculptor and pupil of Domenico Trentacoste. Singer and chansonnier Odoardo Spadaro was Ida's cousin on her mother Mary Marchesini's side.

They had one daughter, Anna (born 1892), who married Andrea Piegaja, owner of the Royal Victoria Hotel in Pisa.

== Exhibitions ==
He participated in numerous exhibitions, including:

- The American Exhibition of the Products, Arts and Manufactures of Foreign Nations, Boston (1883)
- Exposition Universelle, Antwerp (1885)
- Festa dell’Arte e dei Fiori, Florence (1896–1897)
- Exposition Universelle, Paris (1900)
- International Exhibition, Milan (1906)
- Venice Biennale (1895, 1897, 1899, 1903, 1905)

== Works ==
Works by Gelli are held in:

- Galleria d'Arte Moderna, Palazzo Pitti (Florence)
- Museo Stibbert (Florence)
- Galleria Nazionale d'Arte Moderna (Rome)
- Museo Nazionale di Palazzo Mansi (Lucca)
- Villa Museo Puccini (Torre del Lago)
- Museo Revoltella (Trieste)
- Bratislava City Gallery (Bratislava)
- Henry Ford Museum (Dearborn, Michigan, USA)

== Gallery ==
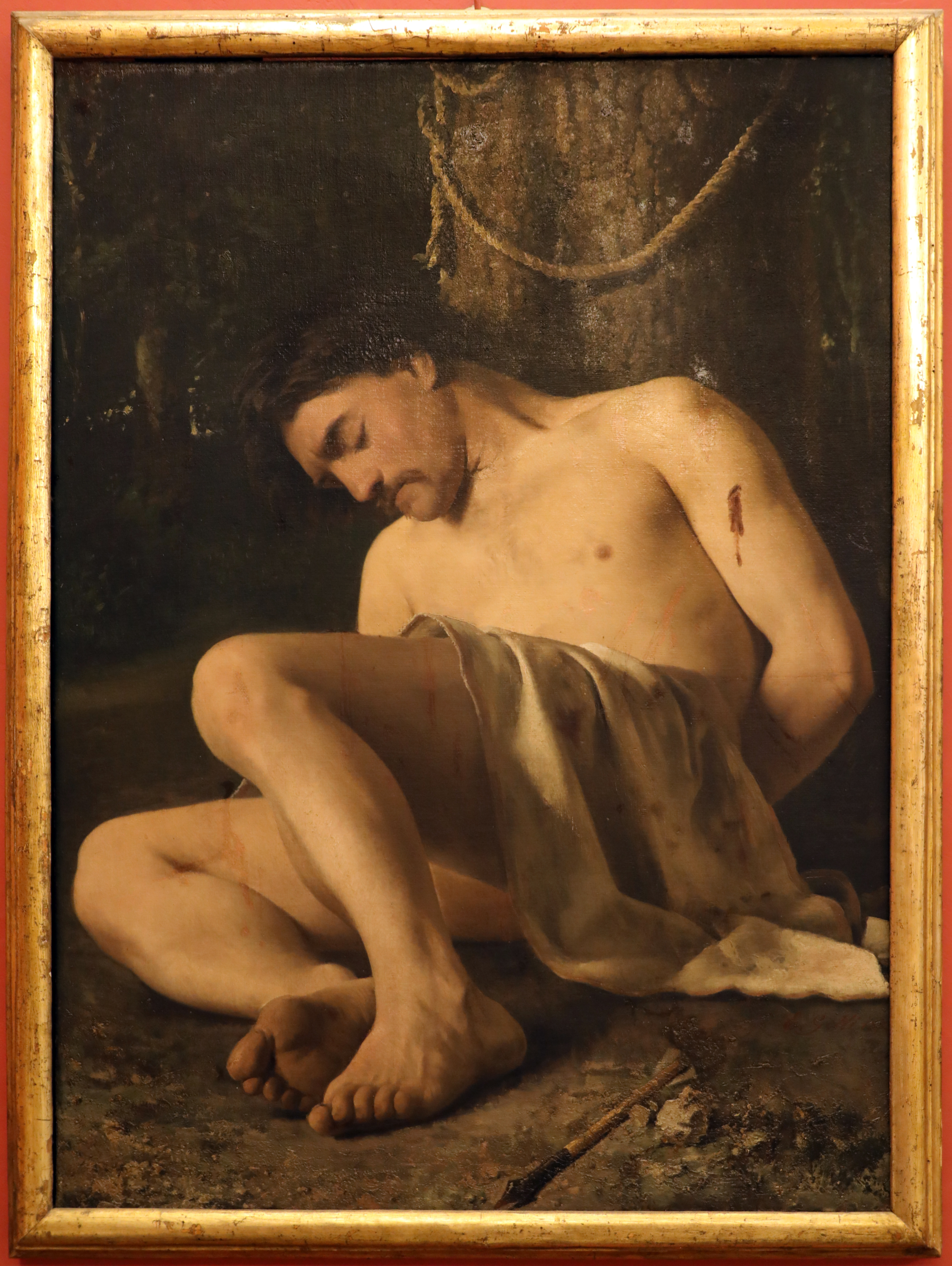
San Sebastian (1873)

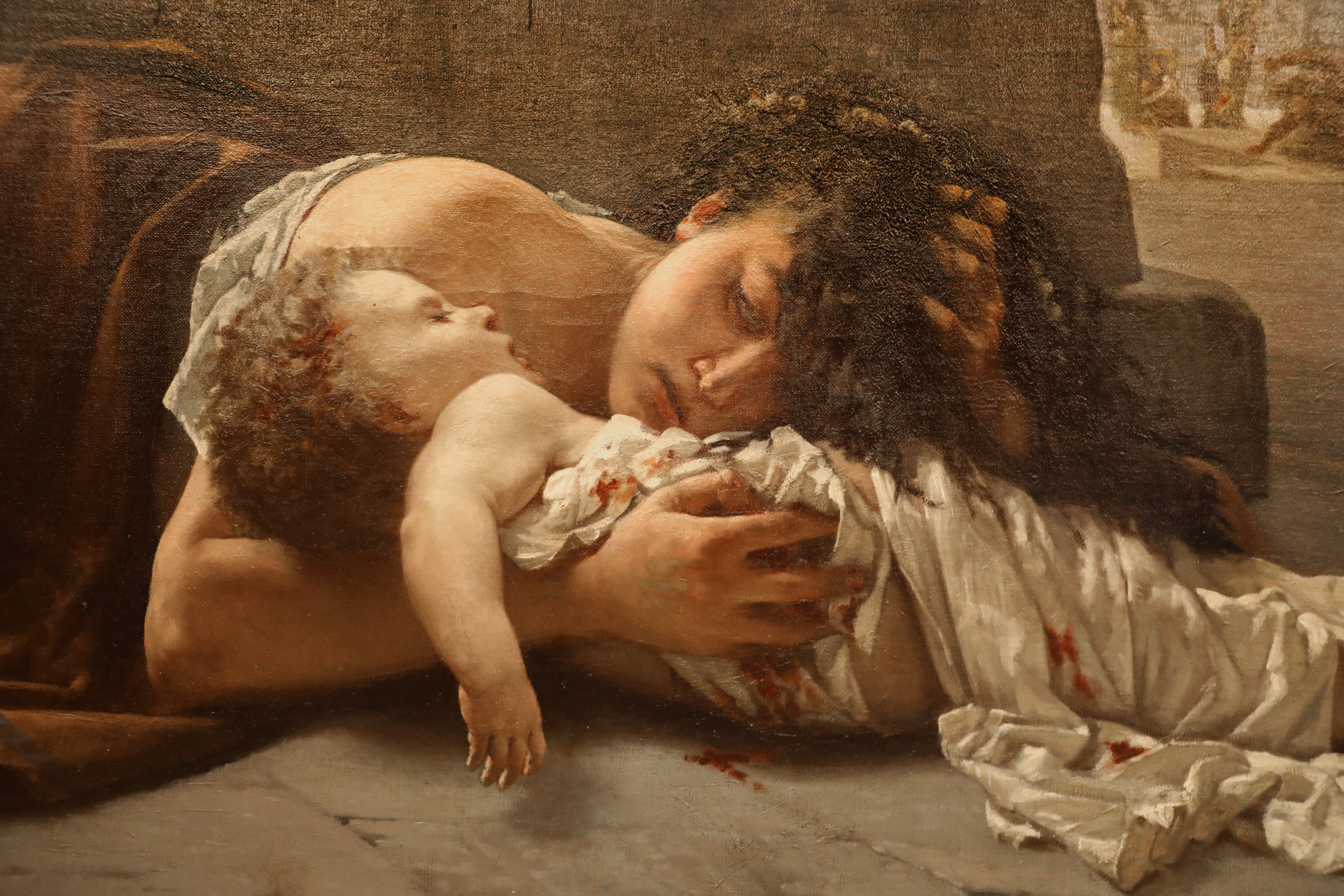
Massacre of the Innocents (1875)

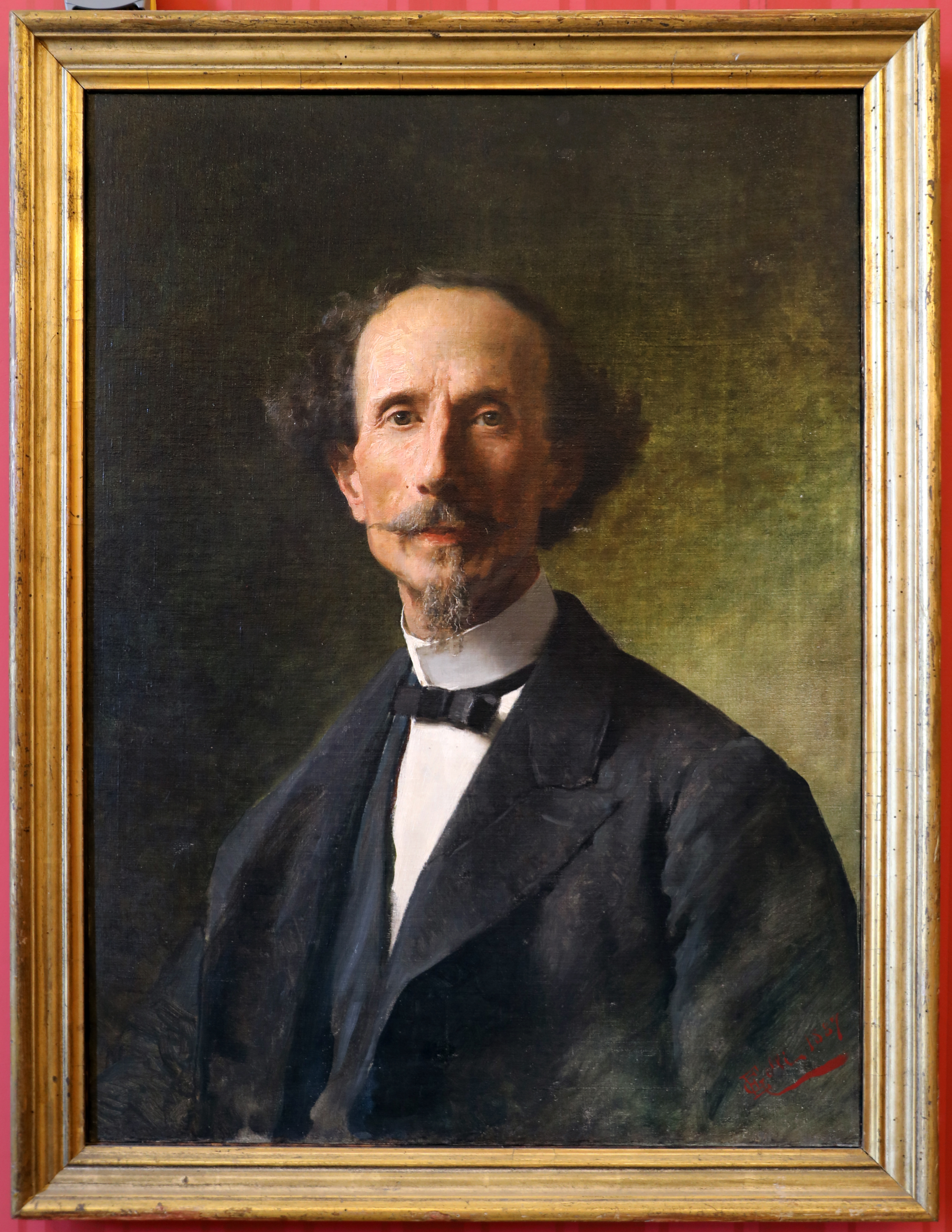
Portrait of Carlo Dal Poggetto (1887)

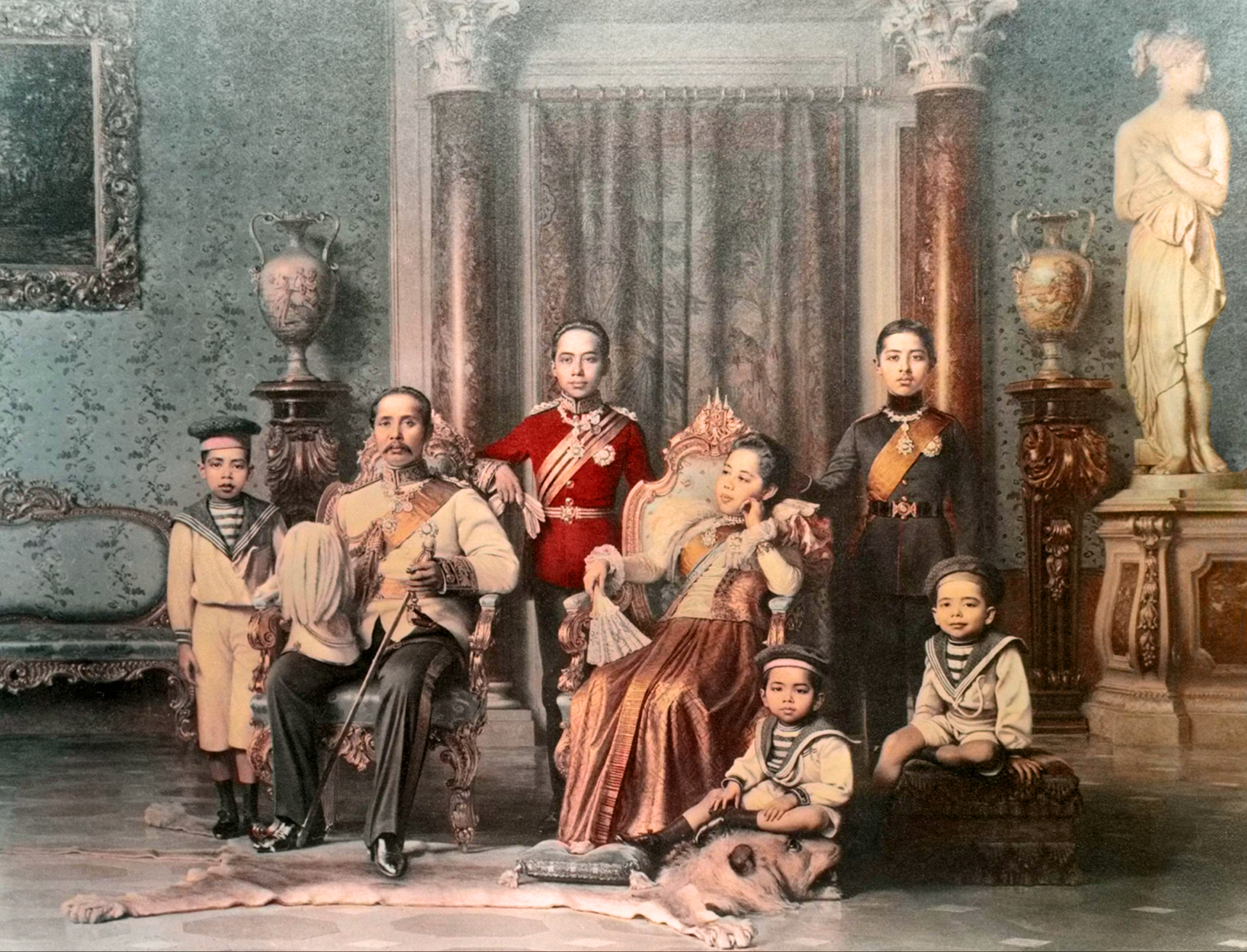
Portrait of King Chulalongkorn and family (1899)

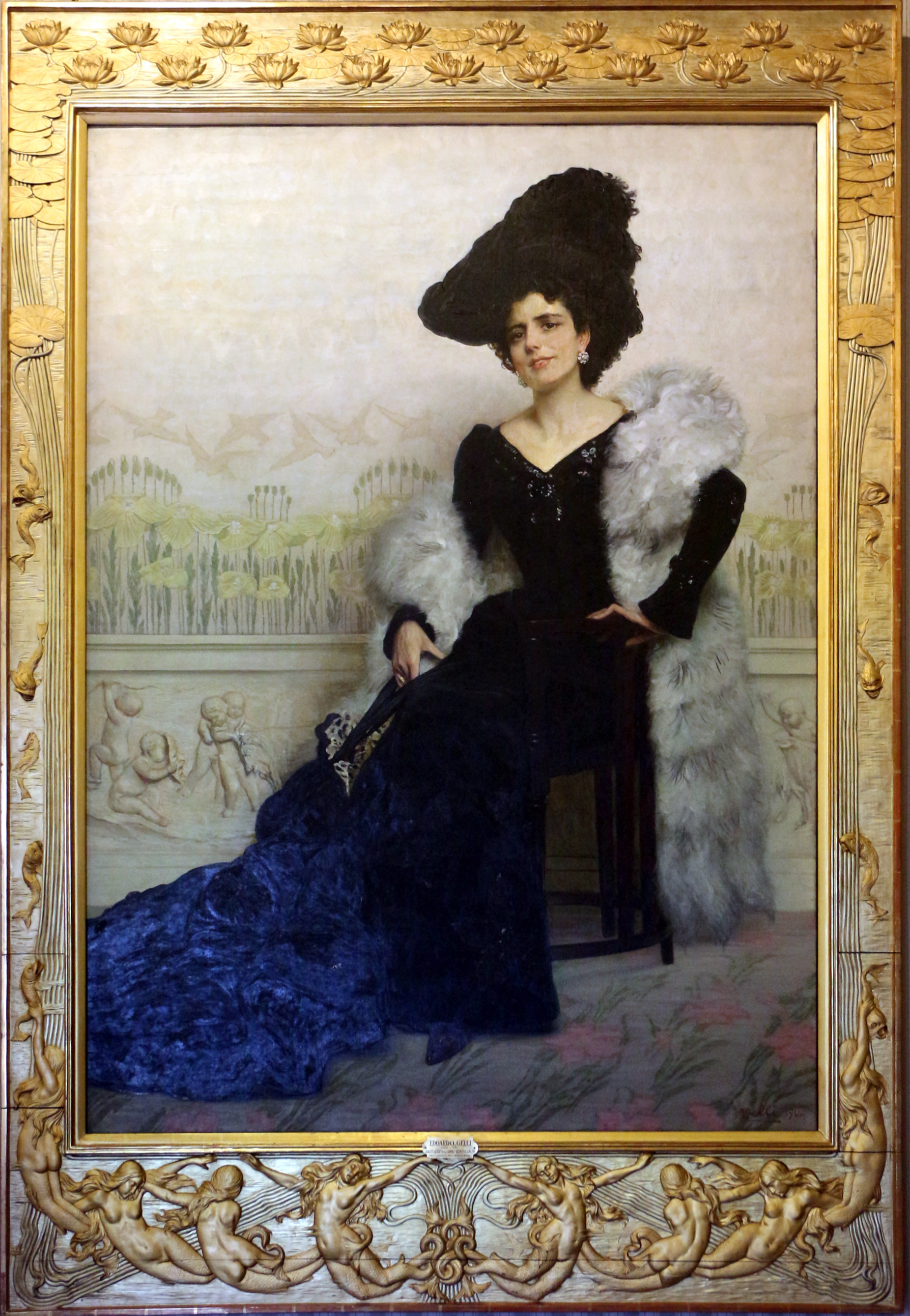
Portrait of Angelina Pagliano, married Bruno (1904)

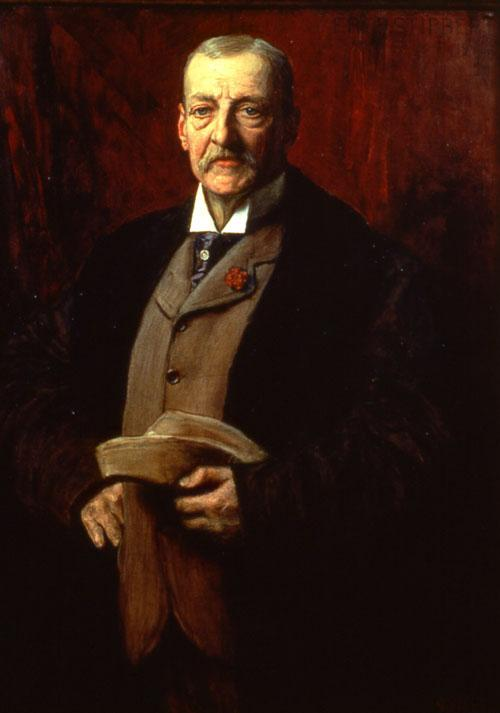
Portrait of Frederick Stibbert (1905)

== Sources ==
- De Gubernatis, Angelo (1889–1892). Dizionario degli artisti italiani viventi (in Italian). Florence.
- Boetticher, Friedrich von (1891). "Gelli, Eduardo". Malerwerke des neunzehnten Jahrhunderts (in German).
- Willard, Ashton Rollins (1902). History of Modern Italian Art.
- Callari, Luigi (1909). La pittura italiana contemporanea (in Italian). Rome. pp. 353–354.
- Thieme, Ulrich; Becker, Felix (1920). "Gelli, Edoardo". Allgemeines Lexikon der Bildenden Künstler (in German). Vol. 13. Leipzig: Seemann.
- Gelli, Jacopo (1934). Edoardo Gelli pittore (in Italian). Livorno: Stabilimento Editoriale Toscano.
- Comanducci, Agostino Mario (1945). Dizionario Illustrato dei pittori, disegnatori e incisori italiani moderni e contemporanei (in Italian). Milan.
- The Bureau of the Royal Household (2005). Grand Palace, Bangkok Thailand. Thai Watana Panich Press. pp. 132–133.
- Fondazione Centro Studi sull’Arte Licia e Carlo Ludovico Ragghianti. "Gelli Edoardo". Archivio Storico Artisti Lucchesi (in Italian).
- Miccichè, Elio (2013). "Lite fra il Principe di Manganelli ed Edoardo Gelli per la non verosimiglianza di due ritratti" (PDF). Incontri (in Italian). II (5).
- Benzi, Fabio (2018). "Puccini e le arti". Per sogni e per chimere. Giacomo Puccini e le Arti Visive (PDF) (in Italian). Lucca: Fondazione Ragghianti. pp. 19–34.
- Panajia, Alessandro (2018). Soffiano Luogo della memoria e degli affetti (in Italian). Pisa: ETS. pp. 39–42.
- Bietoletti, Silvestra (2019). "Pittori dell'Italia sabauda nella raccolta di Frederick Stibbert". Stibbert artista e collezionista (in Italian). Florence: Lorenzo de’ Medici Press. pp. 11–23.
- Galleni, Daniele (2019). "Angiolina Pagliano in Bruno: il ritratto di una donna moderna". Lessico Femminile. Le donne tra impegno e talento 1861–1926 (in Italian). Firenze. pp. 34–38.
