= Gelli Bridge =

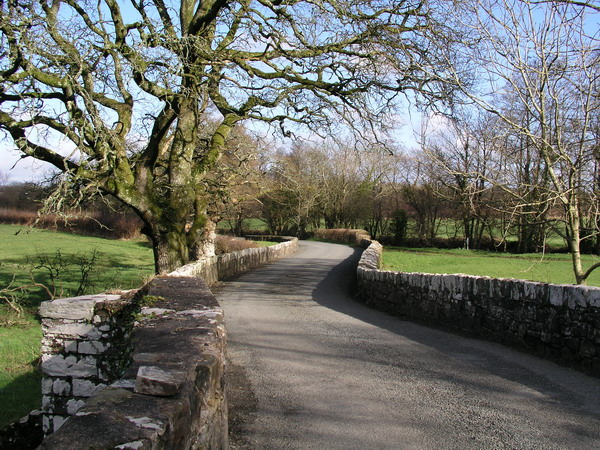
- Gelli Bridge in 2002
- Coordinates: 51.8409°N 4.7821°W
- Crosses: River Syfynwy
- Locale: Gelli, Pembrokeshire
- Heritage status: Grade II

Gelli Bridge is a Grade II listed two-arch bridge spanning the River Syfynwy a few yards before its confluence with the Eastern Cleddau. The date of the bridge is not known, though projecting keystones suggest it is 18th century. It has been modified since its original construction.

The unequal semicircular arches span 7 m and 4 m and the roadway is 2.4 m between the parapets, with wider approaches. It may originally have had a third, small arch to the east of the main span.

The bridge is listed twice (with different IDs and dates) because it falls within two parishes. This listed bridge is not to be confused with several other bridges in the vicinity which carry road and rail across the Eastern Cleddau and another tributary.
