= River Syfynwy =

River in Pembrokeshire, Wales

Coordinates: 51°50′27″N 4°46′57″W

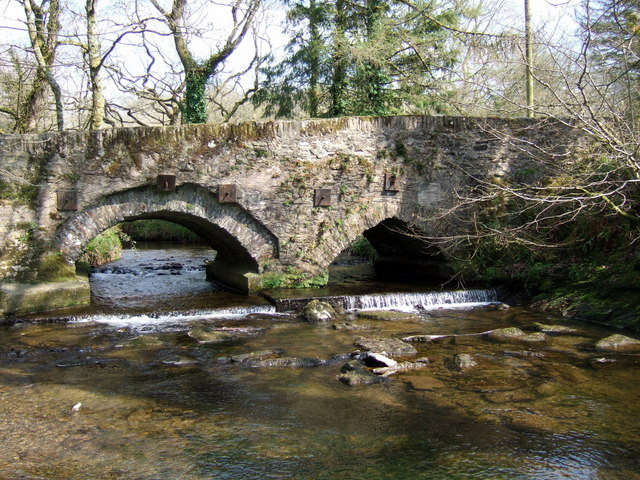
Farthing's Hook Bridge

River Syfynwy (Welsh: Afon Syfynwy, Syfnwy or Syfni) is a river entirely within Pembrokeshire, Wales, rising in the Preseli Mountains, feeding the Rosebush and Llys y Fran reservoirs and joining the Eastern Cleddau to the south. It is a river considered to be important as an ecological indicator and part is in a site of special scientific interest.

== Course ==
The river is formed by the confluence of several streams rising in the southern slopes of the Preseli Hills at some 350 metres (1,150 ft) and flows southwards into Rosebush Reservoir, where it passes through or over the dam. Cascades, Syfynwy Falls, are immediately below the dam and are a visitor attraction when the reservoir is overflowing. Continuing south west, the river flows through a wooded valley - Holmus Wood, Farthing's Hook Wood and Dan-y-Coed, then under the Grade II-listed Farthing's Hook Bridge. It runs between Pen-yr-Allt Wood and Velindre Wood before entering the northern end of Llys y Fran reservoir. This reservoir's dam produces electricity. After the dam, the river flows in a more southerly direction before turning south east, passing under Step-aside Bridge, near Clarbeston, and the 18th century Grade II-listed Gelli Bridge at Gelli Hill to meet the Eastern Cleddau. The river is approximately 10 miles (16 km) long.

== Ecology ==
The river has been used by some researchers as an indicator of ecological health and is included in the River Cleddau catchment area's Site of Special Scientific Interest (SSSI) for its wide range of indigenous wild plants and animals, including water crowfoot, lamprey and otter. The Syfynwy is included in the Eastern Cleddau Special Area of Conservation (SAC). In 2009 the Bro Syfynwy Heritage Group were granted £2,750 to produce a leaflet covering rural and historical life around the upper Syfynwy.

The Llys y Fran Catchment Project is an ecological study based on the Afon Syfynwy catchment from its source to the Llys y Fran dam. The study, begun in July 2014, is focused on understanding the blue green algae blooms that have been occurring in the reservoir and, with the support of landowners, will involve soil sampling and nutrient management. The project is being run in collaboration with Welsh Water and Natural Resources Wales (NRW). As well as farming, the project will also consider the impact of sewage and forestry on the study area as well as water quality and invertebrate populations.

Over the winter of 2013-14 Pembrokeshire Rivers Trust monitored riverflies at Gelli Bridge as part of a wider study of the Eastern Cleddau catchment area. They found fewer numbers than usual, but that most sensitive species were present.

=== Pollution ===
A pollution incident in 1999 where trade effluent was discharged into the river causing the death of an estimated 1,000 brown trout resulted in a fine of £2,500 and £13,021 costs when the case went to court the following year.

== World War 2 ==
During the war the railway at Glan Syfynwy, near Rosebush, was used for bombing practice by the RAF and USAF.

== See also ==
- List of rivers of Wales#Cleddau catchment
- List of bridges in Wales
