= Museo Nazionale di Palazzo Mansi =

Art museum in Lucca, Italy

Coordinates: 43.8436°N 10.4990°E

National Museum of Palazzo Mansi
- Museo Nazionale di Palazzo Mansi
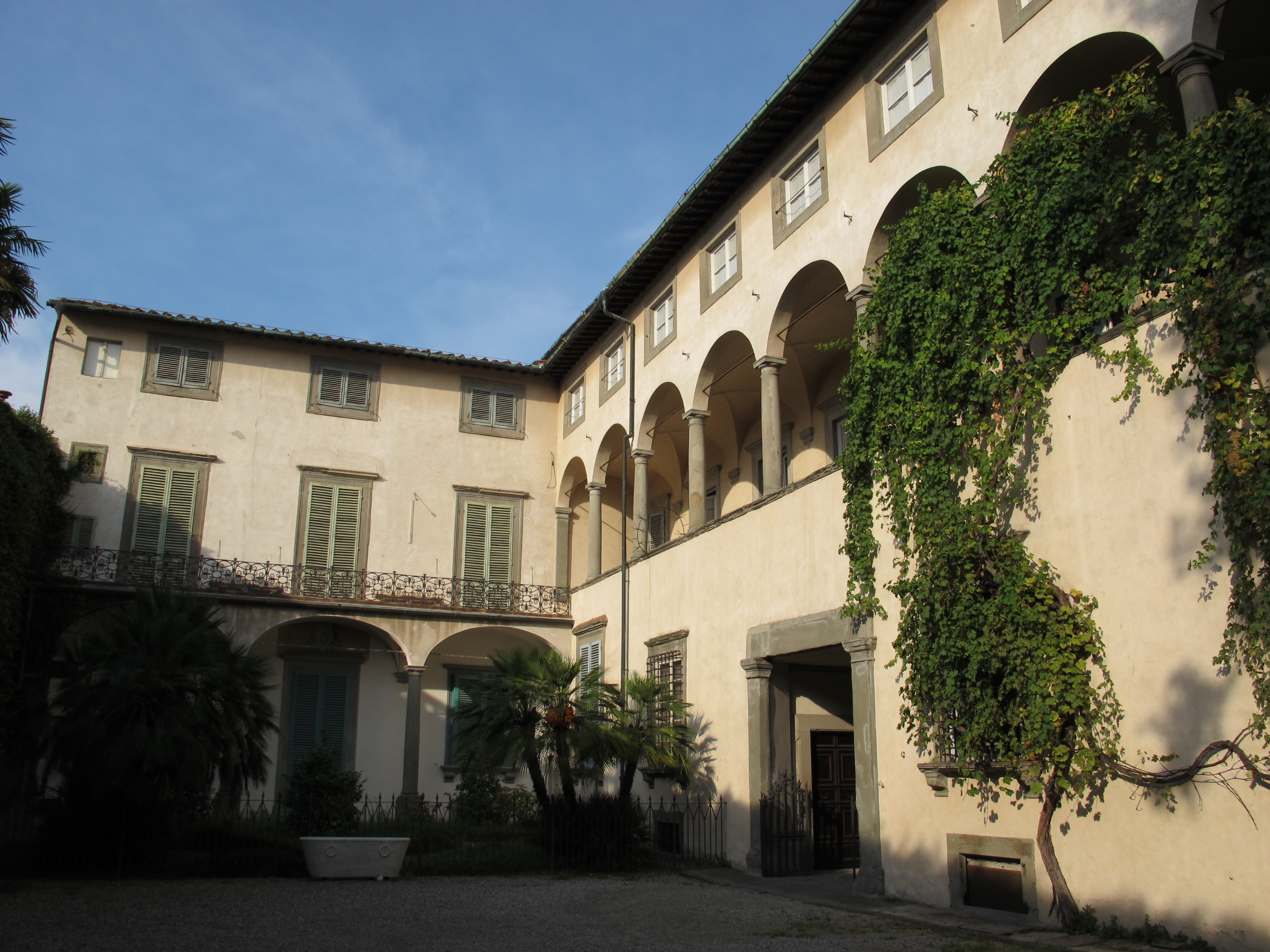
- The courtyard of Palazzo Mansi
- Established: 1965
- Location: Via Galli Tassi, 43, Lucca, Italy
- Website: www.luccamuseinazionali.it

The Museo Nazionale di Palazzo Mansi is one of the two main art museum hosting tapestry collections and mainly post-19th century art collections owned by the city of Lucca, Italy. The collection is displayed in the Baroque palace, formerly belonging to the Mansi family, and located in central Lucca. Many of the original room decorations remain in place.

The Palace was first erected at the site of a few earlier tower-houses bought in 1616 by the Lucchese merchant of silk Ascanio Mansi and his descendants. While the facade retains earlier Renaissance window features, between 1686 and 1691, Ascanio's son Raffaello employed the architect Raffaello Mazzanti to further renovate the now palace, and the piano nobile rooms acquired the present decoration and a grand staircase access. The cooler ground floor rooms were turned into a summer apartment.

In the second half of the 18th century, Luigi Mansi pursued further refurbishing. The Mansi family retained prestige in the early 19th century; Raffaele Mansi and Camilla Parensi had been appointed courtiers to Elisa Bonaparte and Felice Baciocchi. Raffaello Mansi Orsetti, who died in 1956, was the first to display the art collections to the public. In the mid-1960s his children sold the palace to the state, which has converted into a National Museum of arts and tapestries.

The interiors house a highly decorated bedroom alcove with gilded caryatid columns flanking the portal.

== Gallery ==
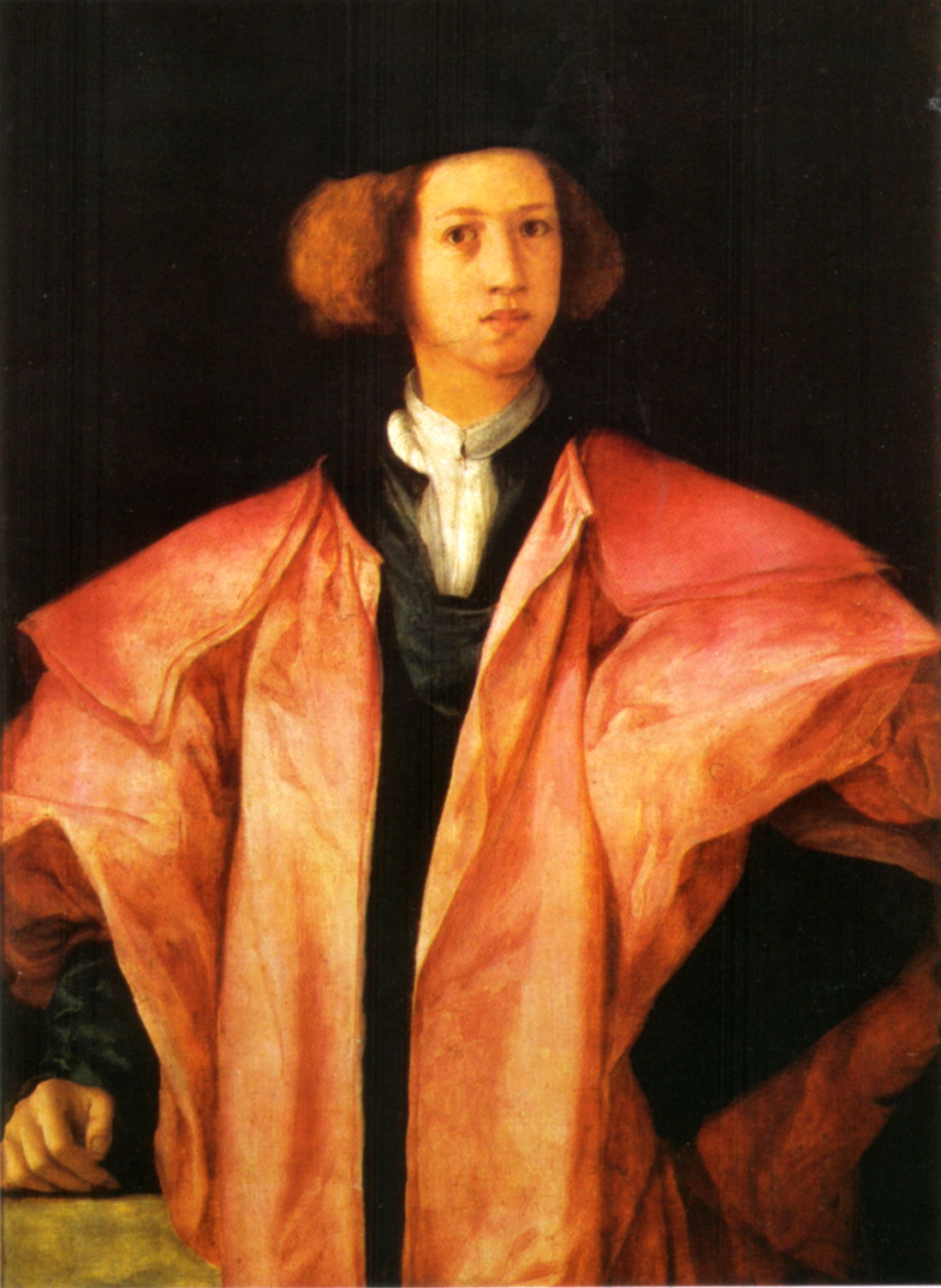
Pontormo:
Porträt of Amerigo Antinori, ca. 1525.

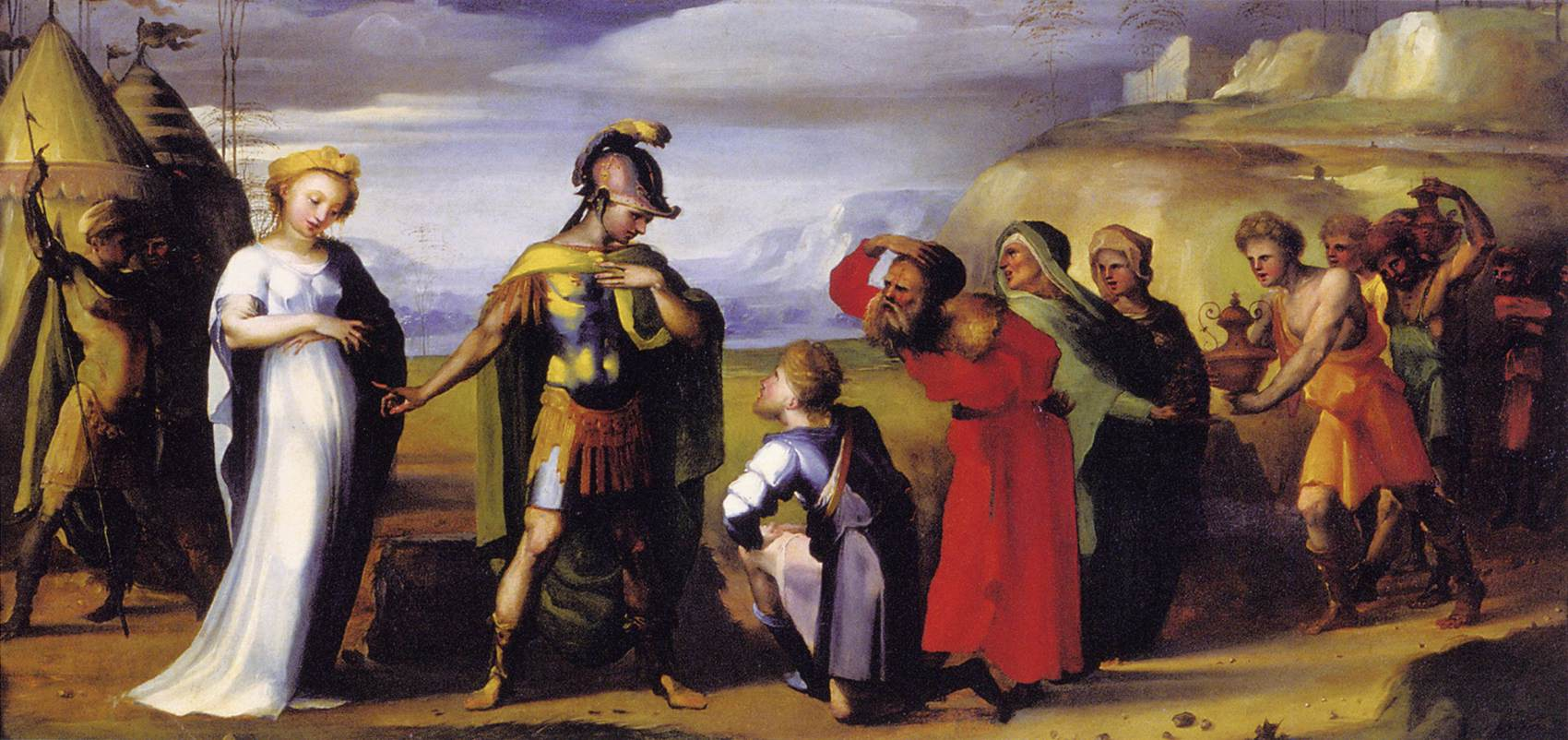
Domenico Beccafumi:
The Continence of Scipio Africanus, ca. 1525.

== See also ==
- Villa Mansi, Segromigno in Monte, the villa of the Mansi family in nearby Segromigno in Monte
