= List of high sheriffs of England, Wales and Northern Ireland 2008 =

This is a list of High Sheriffs in England and Wales, and of Sheriffs in Northern Ireland, for 2008. The appointments for England and Wales are announced each year around March. The majority of appointments are made by Elizabeth II of the United Kingdom and Privy Council. However, the appointment for Cornwall is in the gift of the Duchy of Cornwall, and those for Greater Manchester, Lancashire and Merseyside are in the gift of the Duchy of Lancaster.

Northern Irish appointments are made in December of the preceding year, by the Secretary of State for Northern Ireland.

- The High Sheriff of Bedfordshire (Nazir Jessa)
- The High Sheriff of Berkshire (Dr Carolyn Jane Boulter)
- The High Sheriff of Buckinghamshire (Peter John Thorogood)
- The High Sheriff of Cambridgeshire (Judith Penelope Glossop Bennett Gape Pearson)
- The High Sheriff of Cheshire (Alastair Maxwell Stoddard)
- The High Sheriff of the City of Bristol (Professor Richard Hodder-Williams)
- The High Sheriff of Clwyd (Stephen Dudley Cheshire)
- The High Sheriff of Cornwall (Sir Ralph Ferrers Alexander Vyvyan Bt)
- The High Sheriff of Cumbria (Graham William Lamont)
- The High Sheriff of Derbyshire (Lord Ralph William Francis Joseph Kerr)
- The High Sheriff of Devon (Lady Clifford of Chudleigh)
- The High Sheriff of Dorset (John Roland Raymond)
- The High Sheriff of Durham (Paul Francis Adrian Townley)
- The High Sheriff of Dyfed (Claire Mary Mansel Lewis)
- The High Sheriff of the East Riding of Yorkshire (Michael Jonathan Watson Hall)
- The High Sheriff of East Sussex (Hugh Thomas Burnett)
- The High Sheriff of Essex (Sarah Francesca Courage)
- The High Sheriff of Gloucestershire (Brian Maurice Thornton)
- The High Sheriff of Greater London (Lady Vallance of Tummel)
- The High Sheriff of Greater Manchester (Edith Conn)
- The High Sheriff of Gwent (Judith Elizabeth Child)
- The High Sheriff of Gwynedd (Peter Standing Rogers)
- The High Sheriff of Hampshire (Michael David Colin Craven Campbell)
- The High Sheriff of Herefordshire (Lieutenant Colonel Michael Robin Ogilvie Leigh)
- The High Sheriff of Hertfordshire (Paul David Cherry)
- The High Sheriff of the Isle of Wight (Alan Fred Titchmarsh)
- The High Sheriff of Kent (Richard John Oldfield)
- The High Sheriff of Lancashire (Colonel Ewart Alan Jolley)
- The High Sheriff of Leicestershire (David John Wyrko)
- The High Sheriff of Lincolnshire (John William Lockwood)
- The High Sheriff of Merseyside (Judith Louise Greensmith)
- The High Sheriff of Mid Glamorgan (Anne Yvette Morgan)
- The High Sheriff of Norfolk (Viscountess Knollys)
- The High Sheriff of Northamptonshire (Peter Brian Ellwood)
- The High Sheriff of Northumberland (Charles Richard Beaumont)
- The High Sheriff of North Yorkshire (Christopher William Robson)
- The High Sheriff of Nottinghamshire (Colonel Roger Merryweather)
- The High Sheriff of Oxfordshire (Brigadier Ian Peter Inshaw)
- The High Sheriff of Powys (Thomas Samuel Davis)
- The High Sheriff of Rutland (Thomas Hornby Graham Cooper)
- The High Sheriff of Shropshire (Anne Gee)
- The High Sheriff of Somerset (Anne Caroline Maw)
- The High Sheriff of South Glamorgan (Brian Idris Rees)
- The High Sheriff of South Yorkshire (Dr Robert John Giles Bloomer)
- The High Sheriff of Staffordshire (Catherine Anne Evans)
- The High Sheriff of Suffolk (Diana Ray Hunt)
- The High Sheriff of Surrey (Sally Varah)
- The High Sheriff of Tyne and Wear (John Squires)
- The High Sheriff of Warwickshire (Anna March Trye)
- The High Sheriff of West Glamorgan (Pamela Edith Spender)
- The High Sheriff of the West Midlands (Byron Preston Head)
- The High Sheriff of West Sussex (Sir Richard Drake Kleinwort)
- The High Sheriff of West Yorkshire (Roger Gordon Bowers)
- The High Sheriff of Wiltshire (Margaret Madeline Wilks)
- The High Sheriff of Worcestershire (Lieutenant Colonel Michael Robin Ogilvie Leigh)

== Northern Ireland ==
- The High Sheriff of Antrim (Lady Juliet Clare Frazer)
- The High Sheriff of Armagh (Desmond Robert David Mitchell)
- The High Sheriff of Down (Dr Alan Raymond Gillespie)
- The High Sheriff of Fermanagh (Jonathan Appleby Styles)
- The Sheriff of County Londonderry (Patrick Thaddeus McGinnis)
- The High Sheriff of Tyrone (Robert Andrew Pollock)
- The High Sheriff of Belfast (Margaret McKenzie)
- The Sheriff of the County Borough of Londonderry (Eamon Gee)

== See also ==
- List of High Sheriffs of the United Kingdom (current)
- List of High Sheriffs of England, Wales and Northern Ireland 2009
- List of High Sheriffs of the United Kingdom 2007
