= List of high sheriffs of England, Wales and Northern Ireland 2009 =

This is a list of high sheriffs in England and Wales, and of sheriffs in Northern Ireland, for 2009. The appointments for England and Wales are announced each year around March. The majority of appointments are made by Elizabeth II of the United Kingdom and Privy Council. However, the appointment for Cornwall is in the gift of the Duchy of Cornwall, and those for Greater Manchester, Lancashire and Merseyside are in the gift of the Duchy of Lancaster.

Northern Irish appointments are made in December of the preceding year, or in January, by the Secretary of State for Northern Ireland.

- The High Sheriff of Bedfordshire (Cynthia Mary Gresham)
- The High Sheriff of Berkshire (Dr Christina Bernadette Thérèse Hill Williams)
- The High Sheriff of Buckinghamshire (Allan Thomas Westray)
- The High Sheriff of Cambridgeshire (The Lady De Ramsey)
- The High Sheriff of Cheshire (William Gordon Fergusson)
- The High Sheriff of the City of Bristol (Dr Timothy Lachlan Chambers)
- The High Sheriff of Clwyd (Henry Geoffrey Robertson)
- The High Sheriff of Cornwall (Iain Anthony Mackie)
- The High Sheriff of Cumbria (Elizabeth Honor Susan Thornely)
- The High Sheriff of Derbyshire (Sir Henry John Michael Every)
- The High Sheriff of Devon (Edward David Fursdon)
- The High Sheriff of Dorset (Victoria Mary McDonaugh)
- The High Sheriff of Durham (Alasdair MacConachie)
- The High Sheriff of Dyfed (Gareth Rowlands)
- The High Sheriff of the East Riding of Yorkshire (Patrick William Farnsworth)
- The High Sheriff of East Sussex (William Thomas Cornelius Shelford)
- The High Sheriff of Essex (Rupert Seymour Gosling)
- The High Sheriff of Gloucestershire (Anne Chambers)
- The High Sheriff of Greater London (Andrew Vladimir Rhydwen Morgan)
- The High Sheriff of Greater Manchester (Christian Wewer)
- The High Sheriff of Gwent (Stephen James Brindley Hughes)
- The High Sheriff of Gwynedd (Trevor Norman Corbett)
- The High Sheriff of Hampshire (Clare Virginia Bartlett)
- The High Sheriff of Herefordshire (Gilbert Greenall)
- The High Sheriff of Hertfordshire (Jane Wentworth-Stanley)
- The High Sheriff of the Isle of Wight (Gabrielle Anne Lynam Edwards)
- The High Sheriff of Kent (Jane Margaret Rogers)
- The High Sheriff of Lancashire (Caroline Susan Reynolds )
- The High Sheriff of Leicestershire (Maurice Nicholas Beech Thompson)
- The High Sheriff of Lincolnshire (Lady Sarah McCorquodale)
- The High Sheriff of Merseyside (David Croft McDonnell)
- The High Sheriff of Mid Glamorgan (John Anthony Tal-Williams)
- The High Sheriff of Norfolk (Robert George Russell Carter)
- The High Sheriff of Northamptonshire (Susan Deirdre Fenwick)
- The High Sheriff of Northumberland (John Hamilton Blackett-Ord)
- The High Sheriff of North Yorkshire (Francesca Ann Horsfield)
- The High Sheriff of Nottinghamshire (John Michael Rowen)
- The High Sheriff of Oxfordshire (Charles Richard Dick)
- The High Sheriff of Powys (David Thomas Marner Lloyd)
- The High Sheriff of Rutland (Elizabeth Anne Mills)
- The High Sheriff of Shropshire (Anna Turner)
- The High Sheriff of Somerset (John Alvis)
- The High Sheriff of South Glamorgan (Professor Anthony James Hazell)
- The High Sheriff of South Yorkshire (Helena Muller)
- The High Sheriff of Staffordshire (Richard Byrd Levett Haszard)
- The High Sheriff of Suffolk (James Kennedy Buckle)
- The High Sheriff of Surrey (Lady Elizabeth Toulson)
- The High Sheriff of Tyne and Wear (Gavin MacFarlane Black)
- The High Sheriff of Warwickshire (The Lady Kilmaine)
- The High Sheriff of West Glamorgan (Dr Ronald Bryn John)
- The High Sheriff of the West Midlands (Paul Bassi)
- The High Sheriff of West Sussex (Simon Fairfax Knight)
- The High Sheriff of West Yorkshire (Jeremy John Burton)
- The High Sheriff of Wiltshire (Robert Charles Floyd)
- The High Sheriff of Worcestershire (Gilbert Greenall)

== Northern Ireland ==
- The High Sheriff of Antrim (Nigel Dobbs)
- The High Sheriff of Armagh (Dr Gerard Patrick Millar)
- The High Sheriff of Down (Lady Augusta Nicholson)
- The High Sheriff of Fermanagh (Helen Lanigan Wood)
- The High Sheriff of County Londonderry (David George Henderson)
- The High Sheriff of Tyrone (Dr Brendan J. O’Hare)
- The High Sheriff of Belfast (Francis Samuel McCoubrey)
- The Sheriff of the County Borough of Londonderry (Ian Crowe)

== See also ==
- List of High Sheriffs of the United Kingdom (current)
- List of High Sheriffs of England, Wales and Northern Ireland 2008
- List of High Sheriffs of the United Kingdom 2007
