= List of shrievalties =

List of High Sheriffs in England, Wales and Northern Ireland

This is a list of the present unpaid ceremonial offices of high sheriffs in England and Wales and in Northern Ireland, along with the more localised but equivalent sheriffdoms of 16 towns/cities.

Historically a [high] sheriff was appointed by the Crown to each of the historic counties of England and Wales and those of Ireland. The Sheriffs Act 1887 sets out the appointments and qualifications of sheriffs in England and Wales. The shrievalties were subsequently redefined in terms of the new administrative counties established by the Local Government Act 1888 and Local Government (Ireland) Act 1898. These were abolished in England and Wales in 1974 by the Local Government Act 1972, with shrievalties since then being defined in terms of the new local government areas created by that act. As the structure of local government has changed since the introduction of unitary authorities from the 1990s onwards, the shrievalties in England and Wales are now defined as groups of local authorities, or parts of them, in a similar fashion to the lieutenancies.

The shrieval counties and shrievalties contrast with different words and meaning in Scotland where the office of sheriff has remained a judicial office. Sheriffs preside over sheriff courts with one sheriff principal for each of the six sheriffdoms in Scotland.

== England ==
Shrievalties in England from 1998
Shrievalties in England 1974–1996
Shrievalties in England 1889–1965
- High Sheriff of Bedfordshire
- High Sheriff of Berkshire
- High Sheriff of Bristol
- High Sheriff of Buckinghamshire
- High Sheriff of Cambridgeshire
- High Sheriff of Cheshire
- High Sheriff of Cornwall
- High Sheriff of Cumbria
- High Sheriff of Derbyshire
- High Sheriff of Devon
- High Sheriff of Dorset
- High Sheriff of Durham
- High Sheriff of the East Riding of Yorkshire
- High Sheriff of East Sussex
- High Sheriff of Essex
- High Sheriff of Gloucestershire
- High Sheriff of Greater London
- High Sheriff of Greater Manchester
- High Sheriff of Hampshire
- High Sheriff of Herefordshire
- High Sheriff of Hertfordshire
- High Sheriff of Humberside
- High Sheriff of the Isle of Wight
- High Sheriff of Kent
- High Sheriff of Lancashire
- High Sheriff of Leicestershire
- High Sheriff of Lincolnshire
- High Sheriff of Merseyside
- High Sheriff of Norfolk
- High Sheriff of Northamptonshire
- High Sheriff of North Yorkshire
- High Sheriff of Northumberland
- High Sheriff of Nottinghamshire
- High Sheriff of Oxfordshire
- High Sheriff of Rutland
- High Sheriff of Shropshire
- High Sheriff of Somerset
- High Sheriff of South Yorkshire
- High Sheriff of Staffordshire
- High Sheriff of Suffolk
- High Sheriff of Surrey
- High Sheriff of Tyne and Wear
- High Sheriff of Warwickshire
- High Sheriff of the West Midlands
- High Sheriff of West Sussex
- High Sheriff of West Yorkshire
- High Sheriff of Wiltshire
- High Sheriff of Worcestershire
- High Sheriff of Yorkshire

=== Town sheriffs ===
Town sheriffs are maintained in some of the historic counties corporate. Other than the sheriffs of the City of London these were abolished as substantive offices by the Local Government Act 1972 are “local offices of dignity” only.

- Sheriff of Berwick-upon-Tweed
- Sheriff of Canterbury
- Sheriff of Chester
- Sheriff of Gloucester
- Sheriff of Kingston upon Hull
- Sheriff of Lichfield
- Sheriff of Lincoln
- Sheriffs of the City of London
- Sheriff of Newcastle upon Tyne
- Sheriff of Nottingham
- Sheriff of Norwich
- Sheriff of Oxford (Note: After 1836 Oxford was the only borough allowed to have a sheriff that was not also a county corporate. Whereas in the counties corporate the sheriffs were historically in charge of administering justice and the borough's courts, in Oxford the sheriff's roles were much more limited, primarily concerned with looking after Port Meadow and the city's fisheries.)
- Sheriff of Poole
- Sheriff of Southampton
- Sheriff of York

== Wales ==
- High Sheriff of Clwyd
- High Sheriff of Dyfed
- High Sheriff of Gwent
- High Sheriff of Gwynedd
- High Sheriff of Mid Glamorgan
- High Sheriff of Powys
- High Sheriff of South Glamorgan
- High Sheriff of West Glamorgan

=== Town sheriffs ===
- Sheriff of Carmarthen
- Sheriff of Haverfordwest

== Northern Ireland ==
- High Sheriff of County Armagh
- High Sheriff of County Antrim
- High Sheriff of County Down
- High Sheriff of County Fermanagh
- High Sheriff of County Londonderry
- High Sheriff of County Tyrone
- High Sheriff of Belfast (City)
- High Sheriff of Londonderry City
