= List of high sheriffs of England, Wales and Northern Ireland 2007 =

This is a list of High Sheriffs in England and Wales for 2007. The appointments are announced each year around March. The majority of appointments are made by Elizabeth II of the United Kingdom and Privy Council. However, the appointment for Cornwall is in the gift of the Duchy of Cornwall, and those for Greater Manchester, Lancashire and Merseyside which are in the gift of the Duchy of Lancaster.

- The High Sheriff of Bedfordshire (Dr Vaughan R. Southgate)
- The High Sheriff of Berkshire (Harry Henderson)
- The High Sheriff of Buckinghamshire (Amanda Nicholson)
- The High Sheriff of Cambridgeshire (Peter Horrell)
- The High Sheriff of Cheshire (Nicholas Bromley-Davenport)
- The High Sheriff of the City of Bristol (William Durie)
- The High Sheriff of Clwyd (Jonathan Major)
- The High Sheriff of Cornwall (Evelyn Arthur Hugh Boscawen)
- The High Sheriff of Cumbria (Claire Hensman)
- The High Sheriff of Derbyshire (Roger Wardle)
- The High Sheriff of Devon (Anthony Mildmay-White)
- The High Sheriff of Dorset (Adrian Scott)
- The High Sheriff of Durham (Ian Dewhirst)
- The High Sheriff of Dyfed (Col. David Davies)
- The High Sheriff of East Sussex (Caroline Mayhew)
- The High Sheriff of the East Riding of Yorkshire (Nicholas Hildyard)
- The High Sheriff of Essex (Lady (Diana) Kemp-Welch)
- The High Sheriff of Gloucestershire (Jonathan Carr)
- The High Sheriff of Greater London (Stephen Pethick)
- The High Sheriff of Greater Manchester (Michael Oglesby)
- The High Sheriff of Gwent (Lieut-Col. Michael Harry)
- The High Sheriff of Gwynedd (Dewi Roberts)
- The High Sheriff of Hampshire (Sarah Thorne)
- The High Sheriff of Herefordshire (John Yorke)
- The High Sheriff of Hertfordshire (Howard Guard)
- The High Sheriff of the Isle of Wight (Lt-Col. David Langford)
- The High Sheriff of Kent (Nigel Wheeler)
- The High Sheriff of Lancashire (Ruth Winterbottom)
- The High Sheriff of Leicestershire (Barry Jackson)
- The High Sheriff of Lincolnshire (Patricia Ware)
- The High Sheriff of Merseyside (Philip Noel Love)
- The High Sheriff of Mid Glamorgan (Charles Knight)
- The High Sheriff of Norfolk (Earl of Romney)
- The High Sheriff of Northamptonshire (Lady (Jennifer) Harper)
- The High Sheriff of Northumberland (Sir Hugh Blackett)
- The High Sheriff of North Yorkshire (Philip Ingham)
- The High Sheriff of Nottinghamshire (Commander Peter Moore)
- The High Sheriff of Oxfordshire (Thomas Loyd)
- The High Sheriff of Powys (John Turner)
- The High Sheriff of Rutland (Barbara Gilman)
- The High Sheriff of Shropshire (Meriel Afia)
- The High Sheriff of Somerset (David Medlock)
- The High Sheriff of South Glamorgan (Paul Williams)
- The High Sheriff of South Yorkshire (Col. Jonathan Hunt)
- The High Sheriff of Staffordshire (Graham Stow)
- The High Sheriff of Suffolk (Air Marshal Sir Richard Kemball)
- The High Sheriff of Surrey (Nicholas Sealy)
- The High Sheriff of Tyne and Wear (Nigel Westwood)
- The High Sheriff of Warwickshire (Andrew Arkwright)
- The High Sheriff of West Glamorgan (Martin Trainer)
- The High Sheriff of the West Midlands (Robert Tomlinson)
- The High Sheriff of West Sussex (Colin Field)
- The High Sheriff of West Yorkshire (Rhona Hartley)
- The High Sheriff of Wiltshire (Peter Pleydell-Bouverie)
- The High Sheriff of Worcestershire (John Yorke)
