= List of high sheriffs of England, Wales and Northern Ireland 2010 =

This is a list of high sheriffs in England and Wales, and of sheriffs in Northern Ireland, for 2010. The appointments for England and Wales are announced each year around March. The majority of appointments are made by Elizabeth II of the United Kingdom and Privy Council. However, the appointment for Cornwall is in the gift of the Duchy of Cornwall, and those for Greater Manchester, Lancashire and Merseyside are in the gift of the Duchy of Lancaster.

Northern Irish appointments are made in December of the preceding year, or in January, by the Secretary of State for Northern Ireland.

- The High Sheriff of Bedfordshire (Daniel Thomas Cecil Hanbury)
- The High Sheriff of Berkshire (Catherine May Stevenson)
- The High Sheriff of Buckinghamshire (Countess Howe)
- The High Sheriff of Cambridgeshire (Dr Nigel Wooldridge Brown)
- The High Sheriff of Cheshire (Diana Caroline Barbour)
- The High Sheriff of the City of Bristol (Lois Patricia Golding)
- The High Sheriff of Clwyd (Lady Jones)
- The High Sheriff of Cornwall (James Piran Williams)
- The High Sheriff of Cumbria (James Ronald Carr)
- The High Sheriff of Derbyshire (Fiona Mary Cannon)
- The High Sheriff of Devon (Elizabeth d’Erlanger)
- The High Sheriff of Dorset (Timothy John Palmer)
- The High Sheriff of Durham (Bernard Robinson)
- The High Sheriff of Dyfed (David Llewellyn Pryse Lloyd)
- The High Sheriff of the East Riding of Yorkshire (Adrian Mark Horsley)
- The High Sheriff of East Sussex (Deborah Clare Melanie Bedford)
- The High Sheriff of Essex (Michael William Hindmarch)
- The High Sheriff of Gloucestershire (Ceri Thomas Evans)
- The High Sheriff of Greater London (Ranjit Mathrani)
- The High Sheriff of Greater Manchester (Anil Ruia)
- The High Sheriff of Gwent (Wilfred Hugh Phillips)
- The High Sheriff of Gwynedd (Griffith Richard Eifion Evans)
- The High Sheriff of Hampshire (Alan Charles Lovell)
- The High Sheriff of Herefordshire (Elizabeth Jean Hunter)
- The High Sheriff of Hertfordshire (Gerald Michael Nolan Corbett)
- The High Sheriff of the Isle of Wight (Peter Dudley Kingston)
- The High Sheriff of Kent (Peregrine Tatton Eyre Massey)
- The High Sheriff of Lancashire (Dennis George Mendoros)
- The High Sheriff of Leicestershire (Colonel Robert Cecil John Martin)
- The High Sheriff of Lincolnshire (John Arthur Cadas Godfrey)
- The High Sheriff of Merseyside (Roy Alfred Morris)
- The High Sheriff of Mid Glamorgan (Beverley Humphreys)
- The High Sheriff of Norfolk (Charles William Legh Barratt)
- The High Sheriff of Northamptonshire (David Eric Laing)
- The High Sheriff of Northumberland (Katie Crosbie-Dawson)
- The High Sheriff of North Yorkshire (Richard Clephane Compton)
- The High Sheriff of Nottinghamshire (Amanda Margaret Farr)
- The High Sheriff of Oxfordshire (Marie-Jane Barnett)
- The High Sheriff of Powys (Jennifer Anne Thomas)
- The High Sheriff of Rutland (Sarah Catharine Forsyth)
- The High Sheriff of Shropshire (Hugh Philip Trevor-Jones)
- The High Sheriff of Somerset (Patricia Ann Hunt)
- The High Sheriff of South Glamorgan (Margaret Anne Campbell)
- The High Sheriff of South Yorkshire (Anthony Paul Cooper)
- The High Sheriff of Staffordshire (Ian James Dudson)
- The High Sheriff of Suffolk (Theresa Frances Innes)
- The High Sheriff of Surrey (Robert Harold Douglas)
- The High Sheriff of Tyne and Wear (Susan Margaret Winfield)
- The High Sheriff of Warwickshire (Richard Michael Hardy)
- The High Sheriff of West Glamorgan (Rowland William Parry Jones)
- The High Sheriff of the West Midlands (Anita Kumari Bhalla)
- The High Sheriff of West Sussex (Elizabeth Bennett)
- The High Sheriff of West Yorkshire (Richard Robert Clough)
- The High Sheriff of Wiltshire (Dame Elizabeth Louise Neville)
- The High Sheriff of Worcestershire (Elizabeth Jean Hunter)

== Northern Ireland ==
- The High Sheriff of Antrim (Steven Montgomery)
- The High Sheriff of Armagh (John Niall Collen)
- The High Sheriff of Down (David Corbett)
- The High Sheriff of Fermanagh (Henry Robinson)
- The High Sheriff of County Londonderry (Trevor Kenneth Alastair Magee)
- The High Sheriff of Tyrone (Francis Eugene Shields)
- The High Sheriff of the County Borough of Belfast (Christopher David Matthew Stalford)
- The High Sheriff of the County Borough of Londonderry (Hugh Christopher Hegarty)
