= Homfray =

Homfray is a surname. Notable people with the surname include:

- Don Homfray (1935–2012), production designer
- Francis Homfray (1725–1798), industrialist
- Jeremiah Homfray (1759–1833), ironmaster
- Samuel Homfray (1762–1822), industrialist

== See also ==
- Phillips v Homfray, lawsuit
