= High Sheriff of Glamorgan =

Welsh county ceremonial officer

This page is a list of High Sheriffs of Glamorgan. Sheriffs of Glamorgan served under and were answerable to the independent Lords of Glamorgan until that lordship was merged into the crown. This is in contrast to sheriffs of the English shires who were from the earliest times officers of the crown. Sheriffs in the modern sense, appointed and answerable to the crown, were instituted in the county of Glamorgan in 1541.

On 1 April 1974 the shrievalty of Glamorgan was abolished and replaced by the High Sheriff of West Glamorgan, the High Sheriff of Mid Glamorgan and the High Sheriff of South Glamorgan.

== List of Sheriffs ==
- 1122–1149 Sir Robert Norreis
- 1322 Sir Henry de Wylyngton Barony of Willington of Keir Kenny (Carreg Cennen Castle)
- 1421 Sir John Stradling

=== 16th century ===
- 1541 George Herbert of Swansea
- 1542 Sir Rice Mansel of Margam Abbey
- 1543 Sir Edward Carne of Ewenny Priory
- 1544 William Bassett of Beaupre
- 1545 Sir George Mathew of Radyr
- 1546 John Thomas Bassett of Llantrithyd
- 1547 Miles Mathew of Llandaf
- 1548 Sir Thomas Stradling of St Donat's Castle
- 1549 Edward Lewis of Van, Caerphilly (1st term)
- 1550 Christopher Turbervill of Penllyn Castle
- 1551 James Thomas of Llanmihangel
- 1552 William Herbert of Cogan Pill
- 1553 George Herbert of Swansea
- 1554 Sir Rice Mansel of Margam Abbey
- 1555 Sir Edward Carne of Ewenny Priory
- 1556 Edward Lewis of Van, Caerphilly (2nd term)
- 1557 James Button of Worlton, St.Nicholas
- 1558 William Bassett of Beaupre Castle
- 1559 Sir Richard Walwyn of Llantrithyd
- 1560 Edward Lewis of Van, Caerphilly (3rd term)
- 1561 John Carne of Nash Manor, Cowbridge
- 1562 Thomas Carne of Ewenny Priory
- 1563 David Evans of Great House, Neath
- 1564 Wiliam Herbert of Swansea
- 1565 Miles Button of Worlton, St.Nicholas
- 1566 Wiliam Jenkins of Tythegston & Blaen Baglan
- 1567 Wiliam Herbert of Cogan Pill
- 1568 William Mathew of Radyr
- 1569 Christopher Turbervill of Penllyn Castle
- 1570 Thomas Lewis of The Van, Caerphilly (son of Edward, HS 1549)
- 1571 Miles Button of Worlton, St.Nicholas
- 1572 Thomas Carne of Ewenny Priory
- 1573 Richard Gwyn of Llansannor
- 1574 Sir Edward Stradling of St Donat's Castle
- 1575 Edward Kemeys of Cefn Mably
- 1576 Sir Edward Mansel of Margam Abbey
- 1577 Nicholas Herbert of Cardiff
- 1578 Sir William Herbert of Swansea
- 1579 John Thomas of Llanmihangel
- 1580 William Mathew of Radyr
- 1581 Thomas Carne of Ewenny Priory
- 1582 Sir William Herbert of Swansea
- 1583 Sir Edward Stradling of St Donat's Castle
- 1584 George Herbert of Nash
- 1585 Edward Kemeys of Cefn Mably
- 1586 Nicholas Herbert of Cardiff
- 1587 Thomas Lewis of Van, Caerphilly
- 1588 John Carne of Ewenny Priory
- 1589 Miles Button of Worlton, St.Nicholas
- 1590 Henry Mathew of Radyr
- 1591 Anthony Mansell of Llantrithyd
- 1592 Sir William Herbert of Plas Newydd, Swansea
- 1593 Edmund Mathew of Radyr
- 1594 Sir Thomas Mansell of Margam Abbey
- 1595 Edward Kemeys of Cefn Mably
- 1596 Sir Edward Stradling of St Donat's Castle
- 1597 Richard Bassett of Beaupre Castle
- 1598 Rowland Morgan of Llandaff
- 1599 Thomas Lewis of Ruperra

=== 17th century ===
- 1600 Edward Prichard of Llancaiach
- 1601 John Carne of Ewenny Priory
- 1602 Edward Lewis of Van, Caerphilly
- 1603 Thomas Aubrey of Llantrithyd
- 1604 Sir Thomas Mansell of Margam Abbey, (2nd term)
- 1605 Edward Kemeys of Cefn Mably
- 1606 William Herbert of Swansea
- 1607 Sir Rowland Morgan of Llandaff
- 1608 Sir John Stradling of St Donat's Castle
- 1609 Richard Bassett of Beaupre Castle
- 1610 Morgan Meirick of Cottrell, St.Nicholas
- 1611 George Lewis of Llystalybont
- 1612 Lewis Thomas of Bettws
- 1613 Sir Edward Lewis of Van, Caerphilly
- 1614 Thomas Mathew of Castell-y-Mynach
- 1615 Gabriel Lewis of Llanishen
- 1616 Christopher Turbervill of Penllyn Castle
- 1617 David Kemeys of Cefn Mably
- 1618 William Mathew of Aberaman, Aberdare
- 1619 Edward Van of Marcross
- 1620 Sir John Stradling of St Donat's Castle
- 1621 John Carne of Ewenny Priory
- 1622 William Bassett of Beaupre Castle
- 1623 Sir Thomas Mansell of Margam Abbey (3rd term)
- 1624 Lewis Thomas of Bettws
- 1625 Anthony Gwyn of Llansannor
- 1626 William Bawdrip of Splott, Roath
- 1627 Edmund Thomas of Wenvoe
- 1628 Henry Mansel of Llanddewi, Gower
- 1629 Sir Thomas Lewis of Penmark Place
- 1630 Thomas Lewis of Llanishen (son of Gabriel, HS 1615)
- 1631 Sir Anthony Mansel of Briton Ferry
- 1632 David Evans of Gnoll, Neath
- 1633 Edward Thomas of Llanmihangel
- 1634 John Aubrey of Llantrithyd
- 1635 Watkin Lougher of Tythegston
- 1636 Walter Thomas of Swansea
- 1637 Sir Lewis Mansel, 2nd Baronet of Margam Abbey
- 1638 Edward Prichard of Llancaiach
- 1639 Nicholas Kemeys of Cefn Mably
- 1640 John Carne of Ewenny Priory
- 1641 Robert Button of Worlton, St.Nicholas
- 1642 William Bassett of Miskin
- 1643 Richard Bassett of Fishweir, St.Mary Church & Aberaman, Aberdare
- 1644 Sir Charles Kemeys, 2nd Baronet of Cefn Mably
- 1645 William Thomas of Dan-y-Graig, Swansea
- 1646 Edward Carne of Ewenny Priory
- 1647 Bussy Mansell of Briton Ferry
- 1648: Richard Jones of Michaelston-super-Ely
- 1649 John Price of Gellihir, Ilston
- 1650 John Herbert of Roath
- 1651 George Bowen of Kittle Hill, Cheriton
- 1652 Rees Powell of Coytrahen
- 1653 Edward Stradling of Roath
- 1654 Edward Doddington of Neath Abbey replaced by Humphrey Wyndham of Dunraven
- 1655 William Bassett of Miskin
- 1656 Richard Lougher of Tythegston
- 1657 William Herbert of Swansea
- 1658 Stephen Edwards of Stembridge
- 1659 Richard David of Penmaen, Gower
- 1660 Richard David of Penmaen, Gower
- 1661 Herbert Evans of Gnoll, Neath
- 1662 Gabriel Lewis of Llanishen (son of Thomas, HS 1630)
- 1663 Edward Gamage of Newcastle, Bridgend
- 1664 John Greenuffe of Van, Caerphilly & Bedwas, Mon.
- 1665 Edmund Thomas of Wenvoe
- 12 November 1665: William Basset, of Broviskin
- 7 November 1666: Edward Mathew, of Rhoose & Aberaman
- 6 November 1667: Thomas Mathew, of Castell-y-Mynach
- 6 November 1668: Thomas Button, of Cottrell, St. Nicholas
- 11 November 1669: Philip Hoby, of Neath Abbey
- 4 November 1670: Edward Thomas, of Moulton, Llancarfan
- 9 November 1671: Philip Jones, of Fonmon Castle
- 11 November 1672: Thomas Powell, of Coytrahen
- 12 November 1673: Thomas Lewis, of Penmark Place
- 18 November 1674: William Thomas, of Llanbradach
- 15 November 1675: Richard Seys, of Rhyddings, Neath
- 10 November 1676: Miles Mathew, of Llancaiach
- 15 November 1677: Bussy Mansell, of Briton Ferry
- 1678: Thomas Gibbon, of Trecastle, Llanharry
- 13 November 1679: George Bowen, of Kittle Hill, Cheriton
- 4 November 1680: William Jenkins, of Newbridge (Pontypridd) replaced by Thomas Morgan of Llanrumney
- 1682 Thomas Lewis of Llanishen (son of Gabriel, HS 1662)
- 1683 Oliver Jones of Fonmon
- 1684 Thomas Rees replaced by Reynold Deere of Wenvoe
- 1685 David Jenkins of Hensol
- 1686 Sir John Aubrey, 2nd Baronet of Llantriddyd
- 1687 William Aubrey of Pencoed, Llaniltern
- 1688 Humphrey Edwin of Llanfihangel replaced by Sir Edward Mansel, 4th Baronet of Margam Abbey
- 1689 Thomas Lewis of Penmark Place (selected but excused)
- 1689 David Evans of Gnoll, Neath (selected but excused)
- 1689 Sir Charles Kemeys, 3rd Baronet of Cefn Mably (selected but excused)
- 1689 Thomas Lewis of Penmark Place (died in office)
- 1689 David Evans of Gnoll, Neath
- 1690 Thomas Carne of Nash Manor, Cowbridge
- 1691 John Price of Gellihir
- 1692 William Seys of Swansea
- 1693 Robert Carleton replaced by Richard Lougher of Tythegston replaced by William Matthew of Aberaman, Aberdare
- 1694 Richard Herbert of Plas Cilybebyll
- 1695 John Bennet of Kittle Hill, Cheriton
- 1696 Richard Lougher of Tythegston
- 1697 Richard Morgan of St.George's, Somerset
- 1698 George Howell of Bovehill, St.Andrews Major
- 1699 John Whitwich of Marlston, Berkshire (died in office)

=== 18th century ===
- 1700 Sir John Thomas, 1st Baronet of Wenvoe
- 1701 Thomas Mansel of Penrice Castle, Gower
- 1702 Oliver St.John replaced by Daniel Morris of Clun-y-Castell, Resolven
- 1703 William Bassett of Cowbrodge
- 1704 Sir Humphrey Edwin of Llanfihangel replaced by Robert Jones of Fonmon Castle
- 1705 Thomas Thomas of Llanbradach
- 1706 William Stanley of Neath Abbey
- 1707 Roger Powell of Energlyn, Caerphilly
- 1708 Richard Carne of Ewenny
- 1709 Thomas Button of Cottrell, St.Nicholas
- 1710 Sir Edward Stradling of St Donats
- 1711 Sir John Aubrey, 3rd Baronet of Llantriddyd
- 1712 John Curre of Clemenston
- 1713 Sir Charles Kemeys, 4th Baronet of Cefn Mably
- 1714 Hoby Compton of Neath Abbey
- 1715 Gabriel Lewis of Llanishen
- 1716 Evan Seys replaced by John Jones of Duffryn, Aberdare
- 1717 Edward Thomas of Ogmore
- 1718 Thomas Popkin of Fforest, Llansamlet
- 1719 Michael Williams of Newcastle, Bridgend
- 1720 William Dawkin of Kilvrough, Gower
- 1721 William Richard of Cardiff
- 1722 William Morgan of Coedygores, Llanedyrn
- 1723 Edward Evans of Eaglebush
- 1724 James Williams of Cardiff
- 1725 Abraham Barbour of St.George-super-Ely
- 1726 Morgan Morgan of Llanrumney
- 1727 Francis Popham replaced by Martin Button of Dyffryn, St.Nicholas
- 1728 James Thomas of Llanbradach
- 1729 Robert Jones of Fonmon Castle
- 1730 John Llewellin of Ynysygerwn
- 1731 John Carne of Nash Manor, Cowbridge
- 1732 Reynold Deere of Penllyn Court
- 1733 Herbert Mackworth of Gnoll, Neath
- 1734 William Bassett of Miskin
- 1735 Grant Gibbon of Trecastle, Llanharry
- 1736 Hopkin Rees of St.Mary Hill
- 1737 Robert Knight of Tythegston
- 1738 Edmund Lloyd of Cardiff
- 1739 Thomas Price of Penllergaer
- 1740 Richard Turbervill of Ewenny
- 1741 Rowland Dawkin of Kilvrough, Gower
- 1742 Robert Morris of Ynysarwed
- 1743 Matthew Deere of Ash Hall, Welsh St.Donats
- 1744 Henry Lucas of Stouthall, Reynoldston, Gower
- 1745 Thomas Lewis of Llanishen (son of Thomas, HS 1682)
- 1746 Whitlock Nicholl of The Ham, Llantwit Major
- 1747 Thomas Powell of Tondu
- 1748 John Mathew of Brynchwith, Llandyfodwg
- 1749 Joseph Pryce of Gellihir
- 1750 Richard Jenkins of Morlais, Pyle
- 1751 William Evans of Eaglebush
- 1752 Rowland Bevan of Oxwich, Gower
- 1753 Thomas Rous
- 1754 Edward Walters of Pitcot, St.Brides Major
- 1755 Thomas Popkin of Fforest, Llansamlet
- 1756 William Bruce of Llablethian
- 1757 Thomas Lewis of New House, Llanishen (son of Thomas, HS 1745)
- 1758 Edward Matthew, of Aberaman, Aberdare
- 1759 Thomas Pryce of Dyffryn, St.Nicholas
- 1760 Sir John de la Fountain Tyrwhitt, Bart. of St.Donats
- 1761 Samuel Price of Coity
- 1762 Philip Williams of Dyffryn, Neath
- 1763 Robert Morris of Swansea
- 1764 Abraham Williams of Cathays, Cardiff
- 1765 Calvert Richard Jones of Swansea
- 1766 William Curre of Clemenston
- 1767 Edward Powell of Tondu
- 1768 Thomas Bennet of Laleston
- 1769 Thomas Mathew of Llandaff Court
- 1770 Richard Gorton of Burry's Green, Gower
- 1771 William Thomas of Llanblethian
- 1772 Edward Thomas of Tregroes, Coychurch
- 1773 William Dawkin of Kilvrough, Gower
- 1774 John Edmondes of Cowbridge
- 1775 Daniel Jones of Glanbran
- 1776 William Hurst of Gabalfa, Llandaff
- 1777 David Thomas of Pwllywrach, Colwinston
- 1778 John Lucas of Stouthall, Reynoldston, Gower (son of Henry, HS 1744)
- 1779 Christopher Bassett of Lanelay, Pontyclun
- 1780 Peter Birt of Wenvoe
- 1781 Charles Bowen of Merthyr Mawr
- 1782 Thomas Mansel Talbot of Margam
- 1783 William Kemeys of Ynysarwed
- 1784 John Richards of Energlyn, Caerphilly
- 1785 Stephen White of Miskin
- 1786 Thomas Drake Tyrwhitt of St.Donats
- 1787 John Price of Llandaff Court
- 1788 Richard Jenkins of Pantynawel, Llangeinor
- 1789 John Llewellin of Great House, Welsh St.Donats
- 1790 William Lewis of Greenmeadow, Pentyrch (2nd son of Thomas, HS 1757)
- 1791 John Richards of Corner House, Cardiff
- 1792 John Llewelyn of Ynysygerwn
- 1793 John Lucas of Stouthall, Reynoldston, Gower (son of John, HS 1778)
- 1794 John Kemeys-Tynte of Cefn Mably replaced by Henry Knight of Tythegston
- 1795 Wyndham Lewis of Llanishen (1st son of Thomas, HS 1757)
- 1796 Herbert Hurst of Gabalfa, Llandaff
- 1797 Robert Rous of Cwrtyrala, Michaelston-le-Pit
- 1798 Samuel Richardson of Hensol
- 1799 John Goodrich of Energlyn, Caerphilly

=== 19th century ===
- 5 February 1800: Robert Jenner, of Wenvoe Castle
- 11 February 1801: Llewelyn Traherne of St Hilary
- 17 March 1801: Robert Jones, of Fonmon Castle
- 3 February 1802: Richard Mansel-Philips, of Sketty Hall
- 3 February 1803: John Morris, of Clasemont
- 1 February 1804: Richard Turberville Picton, of Ewenny
- 6 February 1805: Thomas Markham, of Nash Manor
- 1 February 1806: Anthony Bacon, of Cyfarthfa
- 4 February 1807: George Winch, of Clemenstone
- 3 February 1808: Hon. William Booth Grey, of Dyffryn
- 24 February 1808: John Nathaniel Miers, of Cadoxton-juxta-Neath
- 6 February 1809: Sir Jeremiah Homfray, of Llandaff House
- 31 January 1810: Thomas Lockwood of Dan-y-graig
- 8 February 1811: Sir Robert Lynch-Blosse, 8th Baronet, of Gabalfa
- 24 January 1812: Morgan Popkin Traherne, of Coytrahen
- 10 February 1813: William Jones, of Corntown
- 4 February 1814: Hon. William Booth Grey, of Dyffryn
- 13 February 1815: William Taitt, of Cardiff
- 1816 Henry John Grant, of Gnoll Castle, replaced by Richard John Hill, of Plymouth Lodge, Merthyr Tydfil
- 1817 Thomas Bates Rous of Cwrtyrala, Michaelston-le-Pit
- 1818 Lewis Weston Dillwyn of Sketty Hall
- 1819 Josiah John Guest of Dowlais House, Merhyr Tydfil
- 1820 Richard Blakemore of Velindre, Whitchurch
- 1821 William Forman of Peydarren, Merthyr Tydfil
- 1822 Sir John Morris, 2nd Baronet of Bryn & Sketty Park, Swansea
- 1823 John Edwards of Rheola, Resolven
- 1824 John Bassett of Bonvilston
- 1825 John Bennet of Laleston
- 1826 Thomas Edward Thomas of Swansea
- 1827 John Henry Vivian of Marino, Swansea
- 1828 Robert Francis Jenner of Wenvoe
- 1829 William Crawshay the younger, of Cyfathfa Castle, Merthyr Tydfil
- 1830 William Williams, of Aberpergwm
- 1831: Richard Hoare Jenkins, of Lanharran
- 1832: Frederick Fredricks, of Duffryn
- 1833: Richard Turberville Turberville, of Ewenny Abbey
- 1834: Henry John Grant, of Gnoll Castle
- 1835: John Dillwyn Llewellyn, of Penllergare
- 1836: Thomas Penrice, of Kilvrough
- 1837: Howel Gwyn, of Alltwen
- 1838: Nash Vaughan Edwards-Vaughan, of Lanelay, was initially appointed, but was replaced by Howel Gwyn, of Alltwen, who was in turn superseded by Robert Oliver Jones, of Fonmon Castle
- 1839: Charles Henry Smith, of Gwernllwynwyth
- 1840: Michael Williams, of Morfa
- 1841: Joseph Martin, of Ynystawe
- 1842: Henry Lucas, of Uplands
- 1843: John Homfray, of Llandaff-House
- 1844: John Bruce Pryce, of Duffryn
- 1845: Robert Savours, of Trecastle
- 1846: Richard Franklen, of Clementston
- 1847: Nash Vaughan Edwards-Vaughan, of Rheola
- 1848: Thomas William Booker, of Velindra
- 1849: Robert Boteler, of Llandough Castle and Maesmawr
- 1850: Rowland Fothergill, of Hensol Castle
- 1851: Gervas Powell Turbervill, of Ewenny Abbey, Bridgend
- 1852: Griffith Llewellyn, of Baglan Hall
- 1853: Richard Hill Miers, of Ynispenllwch
- 1854: William Llewellyn, of Courtcolman
- 1855: Wyndham William Lewis, of the Heath, near Cardiff
- 1856: John Samuel, of Newton House
- 1857: Evan Williams, of Duffryn-frwd
- 1858: Henry Lewis, of Green Meadow
- 1859: Charles Crofts Williams, of Roath Court
- 1860: George Grey Rous, of Court-y-ralla
- 1861: Edward Robert Wood, of Stouthall
- 1862: Sir Ivor Guest, 2nd Baronet, of Sully House
- 1863: John Popkin Traherne, of Coytrahene
- 1864: Robert Francis Lascelles Jenner, of Wenvoe Castle
- 1865: Thomas William Booker, of Velindra
- 1866: William Graham Vivian of Singleton, near Swansea
- 1867: Thomas Penrice, of Kilvrough House, near Swansea
- 1868: George Thomas Clark, of Talygarn
- 1869: Edward Romilly, of Porthkerry
- 1870: George Williams Griffiths Thomas, of Coedriglan
- 1871: Vaughan Hanning Lee, of Lanelay, near Pontypridd
- 1872: Charles Henry Williams of Roath Court, Cardiff
- 1873: Francis Edmund Stacey of Llandough-juxta-Cowbridge
- 1874: John Whitlock Nicholl Carne of St.Donats
- 1875: Morgan Stuart Williams of Aberpergwm
- 1876: Thomas Picton Turbervill of Ewenny
- 1877: Herbert Lloyd of Plas Cilybebyll
- 1878: Sir John Dillwyn-Llewelyn, 1st Baronet
- 1879: Richard Knight Prichard of Craig Avon, Taibach
- 1880: John Trevillian Jenkins of the Mirador, Swansea
- 1881: John Crow Richardson of Swansea
- 1882: Sir Joseph Layton Elmes Spearman, 2nd Baronet of Lanelay, Pontyclun
- 1883: Lt-Gen. Henry Roxley Benson of Fairy Hill, Gower
- 1884: John Cole Nicholl of Merthyr Mawr
- 1885: Lt-Col. Edward Stock Hill of Rookwood, Llandaff
- 1886: Lt-Col Charles Richard Franklen of Clemenstone
- 1887: Tudor Crawshay of Bonvilston
- 1888: John Henry Rowland of Ffrwd Vale, Neath
- 1889: John Jones Jenkins of the Grange, Swansea
- 1890: Frederick Lewis Davis, of Bryndderwen, Ferndale
- 1891: Edward Rice Daniel, of Cwmgelly, near Swansea
- 1892: Arthur Gilbertson, of Glanrhyd, Pontardawe
- 1893: Robert Forrest, of St. Fagans, Cardiff
- 1894: Morgan Bransby Williams, of Killay, near Swansea
- 1895: Ralph Thurstan Bassett, of Crossways, Cowbridge
- 1896: Colonel John Picton Turbervill of Ewenny Priory, Bridgend
- 1897: Godfrey Lewis Clark, of Talygarn, Pontyclun
- 1898: Thomas Roe Thompson, of Erw'r Delyn, near Penarth
- 1899: John Illtyd Dillwyn Nicholl of Merthyr Mawr, Bridgend

=== 20th century ===
- 1900: Sir Robert Armine Morris, 4th Baronet of Sketty Park, Swansea
- 1901: Griffith Thomas, of Court Herbert, Neath
- 1902: Edward Daniel, of Rose Hill, Swansea
- 1903: John Glasbrook, of Sketty Court, Swansea
- 1904: William Walters, of Ffynone, Swansea
- 1905: Herbert Eccles, of Penrhiewtyn House, Neath
- 1906: William Henry Edwards of The Poplars, Morriston
- 1907: Walter Rice Evans of Eaglesbush, Neath
- 1908: Frederick William Gibbins of Garthmor, Neath
- 1909: David Lewis, of Gorseinon
- 1910: William John Percy Player, of The Quarr, Clydach
- 1911: William James Tatem, of The Court, St. Fagans (later created Baron Glanely of St. Fagans 1918)
- 1912: Colonel William Charles Wright of Gwern Einon, Blackpill
- 1913: James Herbert Cory, of Coryton, Whitchurch, Cardiff
- 1914: Thomas Jeremiah Davies of Morfydd House, Morriston
- 1915: Trevor Stanley Jones of Frondeg, Radyr, near Cardiff
- 1916: Sir John Wesley Courtis of Fairwater Croft, Llandaff.
- 1917: Daniel Radcliffe of Tal-y-werydd, Cardiff
- 1918: John Arthur Jones of Ty Dyfrig, Llandaff
- 1919: Edmund Lyons Evan-Thomas of Neath
- 1920: Henry Gething Lewis of Porthkerry Rectory, Barry
- 1921: Wyndham Darner Clark of Tal-y-garn, Pontyclun
- 1922: Sir Francis Caradoc Rose-Price, 5th Baronet of Hensol Castle, Pontydun
- 1923: Sidney Hutchinson Byass of Llandough Castle, near Cowbridge
- 1924: Wyndham Ivor Radcliffe of Druidstone, near Cardiff
- 1925: William Herbert Clydwyn Llewellyn of Court Colman, Bridgend
- 1926: Admiral Algernon Walker-Heneage-Vivian of Clyne Castle, Blackpill, Swansea
- 1927: David George Hall of Gwentland, Marine Parade, Penarth
- 1928: Theodore Gibbins of Glyn Felin, Neath
- 1929: William Simons of Pen-y-lan Court, Cardiff
- 1930: Major Evan John Carne David of Fairwater House, Cardiff
- 1931: Sir Lewis Lougher, of Danybryn, Badyr, near Cardiff
- 1932: William Cope, 1st Baron Cope of St Mellons
- 1933: Thomas Edward Morel, of Roxburgh, Penarth
- 1934: Herbert Henry Merrett, of Bryn Hafod, Llandaff
- 1935: John Herbert Cory, of The Grange, St. Brides-super-Ely
- 1936: Sir William James Thomas, of Birchwood Grange, Penylan, Cardiff
- 1937: Capt. John Elliot Seager, of Ty Gwyn Court, Penylan, Cardiff
- 1938: Sir Emsley Carr of Wonford, Walton Heath, Tadworth, Surrey
- 1939: William John Treseder Treseder-Griffin of Lisvane House, Lisvane, Cardiff
- 1940: Harry Lascelles Carr of Corbar, Beech Hill, Hadley Wood, Barnet, Hertfordshire
- 1941: Major Joseph Gerald Gaskell of Cwrt Cefn, Lisvane, Glamorgan
- 1942: Reginald Pendrill St. John Charles, of Newton House, Porthcawl, Glamorganshire
- 1943: Major David Percy Davies of Charnwood, Radlett, Hertfordshire
- 1944: Selwyn Rawlings Martyn of The Mount, Dinas Powis, Glamorgan.
- 1945: Jonah Arnold of Tower House, Loughor Gardens, Porthcawl, Glamorgan.
- 1946: Sir Willie Reardon-Smith, 2nd Baronet, of Golding, Peterston-super-Ely, Glamorgan.
- 1947: Colonel Robert Godfrey Llewellyn of Tredilion Park, near Abergavenny.
- 1948: Edward Julian Pode of Great House, Bonvilston, Glamorgan
- 1949: Sir Percy Edward Thomas of Tregenna, Mill Road, Llanishen, Cardiff.
- 1950: Lieut.-Colonel Sir Rhys Llewellyn, 2nd Baronet of The Court, St. Fagans, Glamorgan.
- 1951: David Martyn Evans Bevan of Twyn-yr-Hydd, Margam, Glamorgan.
- 1952: Major Douglas Alexander Duncan of Innisfree, Clinton Road, Penarth, Glamorgan.
- 1953: Sir Hugo Robert Brooke Boothby, 14th Baronet of Fonmon Castle, near Barry, Glamorgan.
- 1954: Llewellyn Ward of Highways, St.Andrews Road, Dinas Powis, Glamorgan.
- 1955: Charles Reginald Wheeler of Highfield, Bradford Place, Penarth.
- 1956: Major Edmund Ashley Charles Westby of "Trehedyn", Peterston-super-Ely.
- 1957: Group Captain Ronald Scott Sugden, of Merevale, Dinas Powis.
- 1958: Squadron Leader Henry Gethin Lewis, of "Cliffside," Penarth.
- 1959: John Cory of The Grange, St.Brides-Super-Ely.
- 1960: Duncan Hubert David Alexander, of "Star House", Capel Llanilterne.
- 1961: William Frederick Cartwright, of Castle-upon-Alun, St. Brides Major, near Bridgend.
- 1962: Anthony George Berry, of Llantrithyd House, Llantrithyd.
- 1963: David Wyamar Vaughan, of Colwinston House, Colwinston, near Cowbridge.
- 1964: Christopher Gordon Llewellin Cory of Penllyn Castle, Cowbridge
- 1965: Richard Charles Quintin Picton-Turbervill, of Ewenny Priory, Bridgend.
- 1966: George Mervyn Williams, of Llanharan House, Llanharan.
- 1967: Jim Stanley Hamilton Mathews, of West House, Llantwit Major, Glamorgan.
- 1968: Susan Eva Williams, of Caercady, Welsh St. Donats, Cowbridge.
- 1969: Lieut.-Colonel John Rhodri Llewellyn Trahearne, of Castellau, Llantrisant.
- 1970: Arthur Geoffrey Gilbertson, of Brynyfro, Llamblethian, Cowbridge
- 1971: Christopher Paul Mansel Methuen-Campbell, of Penrice Castle, Oxwich, Swansea
- 1972: George Forbes Raymond Hayes, of Brocastle, Bridgend
- 1973: Mathew Caradoc Thomas Prichard, of Pwllywrach, Cowbridge
- 1974 onwards – see High Sheriff of West Glamorgan, High Sheriff of Mid Glamorgan or High Sheriff of South Glamorgan
