= Penydarren Ironworks =

Ironworks in Merthyr Tydfil, Wales

Coordinates: 51°45′11″N 3°22′10″W

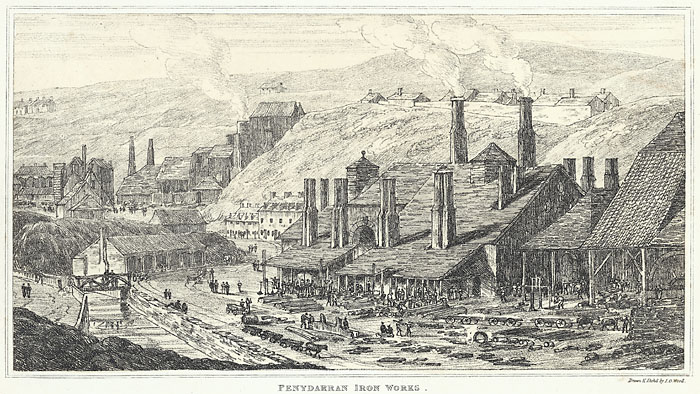
Penydarren iron works, 1811

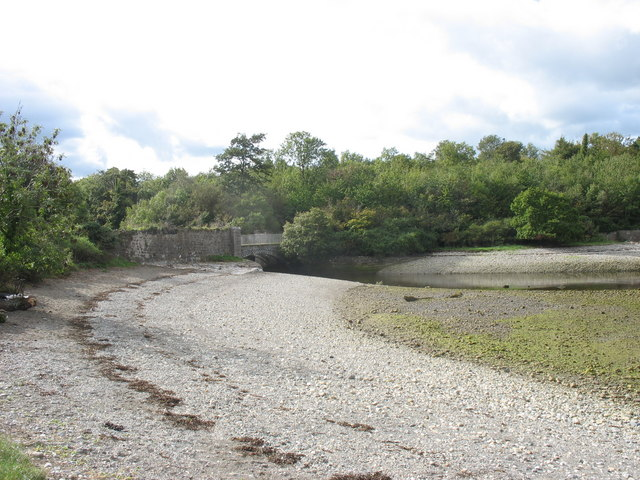
The lowest bridge over the River Ogwen, is a private bridge within the walls of Penrhyn Park bears the inscription Penydarren Ironworks Glamorganshire

Penydarren Ironworks was the fourth of the great ironworks established at Merthyr Tydfil in South Wales.

Built in 1784 by the brothers Samuel Homfray, Jeremiah Homfray, and Thomas Homfray, all sons of Francis Homfray of Stourbridge. Their father, Francis, for a time managed a nail warehouse there for Ambrose Crowley. Most of the family were involved in trade as ironmasters or ironmongers (in this context meaning a manufacturer of iron goods). Samuel built Penydarren House on the opposite bank of the River Taf, as a home for the family locally.

Because the owners of the Cyfarthfa Ironworks dominated the management of Glamorganshire Canal, the other Merthyr Tydfil ironworks built a tramroad to Abercynon, bypassing the upper sections of the canal. This "Penydarren Tramroad" (more correctly, the Merthyr Tramroad) was used for a trial of the first railway steam locomotive, built by Richard Trevithick. This successfully hauled wagons but was so heavy that it broke many rails. The engine was then used for other purposes as a stationary engine.

The business was financed by William Forman of the Tower of London, who provided all the capital, partly on mortgage but taking a share in it himself. Samuel Homfray left the business in 1813. In 1819, the partners were William Forman and William Thompson of London. William Forman offered the works for sale in 1859, and the Dowlais Iron Company bought the mineral ground. The works were used intermittently by various others until 1883. Some remains of the works are present.
