= Llanharan House =

Historic site in Wales

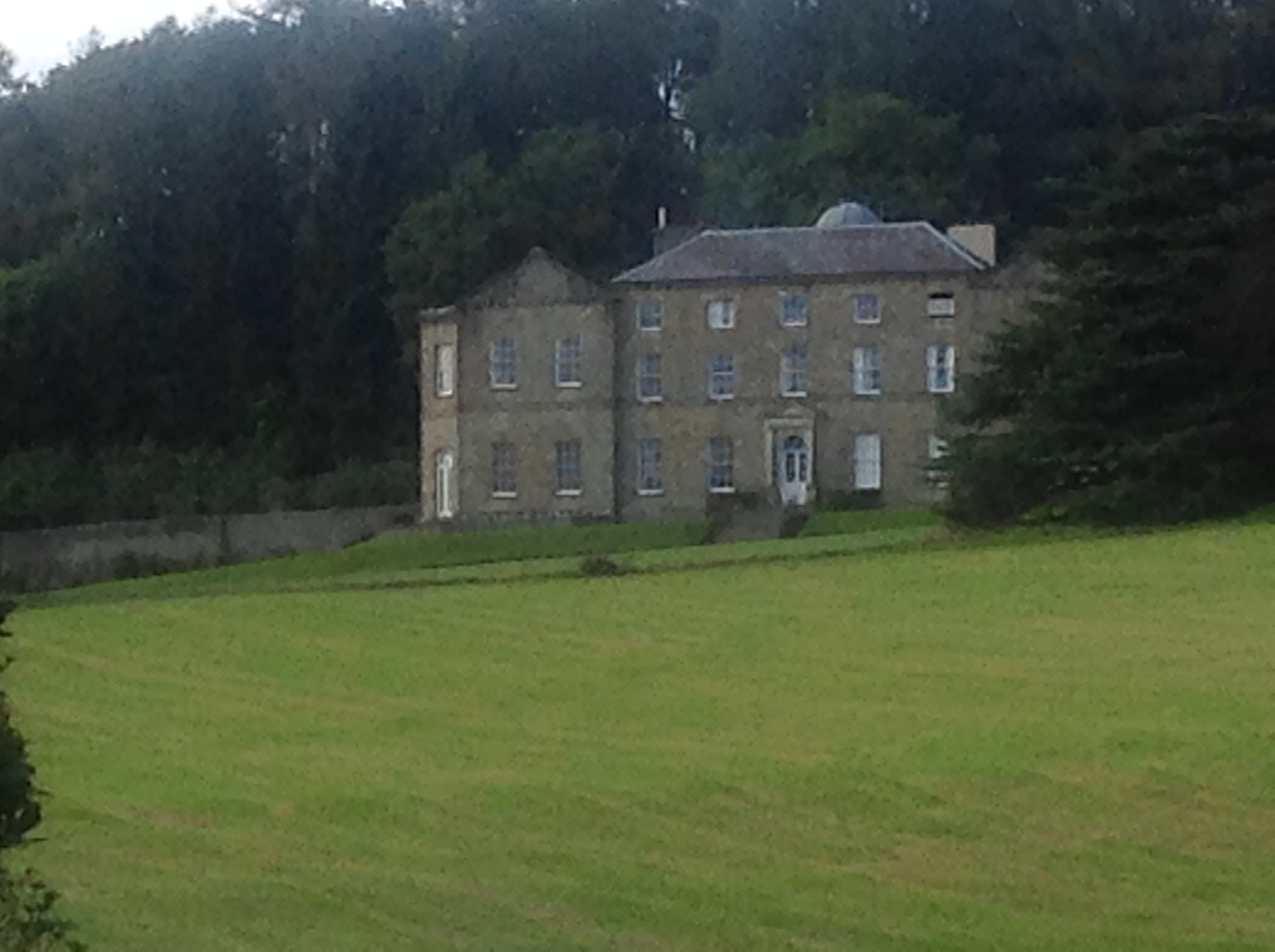
- Llanharan House

- Location within Rhondda Cynon Taf

General information
- Architectural style: Neo-classical regency
- Location: Llanharan, Rhondda Cynon Taf, Wales
- Coordinates: 51°32′19″N 3°25′54″W
- Completed: 1750

Llanharan House is a historic house on the outskirts of Llanharan, Rhondda Cynon Taf, Wales. It is located off the A473 road, just east of Llanharan and is a Grade II* listed building. The gardens and park attached to the house are designated Grade II on the Cadw/ICOMOS Register of Parks and Gardens of Special Historic Interest in Wales.

== History ==
The house was built in 1750 by Rees Powell and stayed with the Powell family until 1795 upon which it was purchased by Richard Hoare Jenkins. Hoare Jenkins was a High Sheriff of Glamorgan who was involved in the suppression of the Merthyr Rising of 1831 and is recorded as stating that he found the execution of Dic Penderyn the most difficult of his civic duties. Around 1800 some major improvements were made to the house with the addition of a three-storey circular stair hall which includes a dramatic geometrical staircase. Following the death of Hoare Jenkins in 1856 the house and the estate was passed to a Colonel John Blandy-Jenkins. Following his death in 1915 Colonel Blandy-Jenkins's wife kept the house until 1953, after which it was bought by Sir George Williams CBE MC, a descendant of Oliver Cromwell, of the Williams family of Aberpergwm House and St Donat's Castle and his wife Grizzle a descendent of Thomas Cochrane, 10th Earl of Dundonald. The recusant Williams family established a Catholic Chapel in the house, as there was no local Catholic Church, which was in use until the early 2000s when a church was built in Miskin. Three members of the family served as High Sheriff of Mid Glamorgan while living at the house. The Williams family emigrated and sold the house in 2015 ending over 600 years of the family being based in South Wales.

The house has been used regularly for filming for programmes such as Sherlock, Upstairs Downstairs, Doctor Who and Pobol y Cwm. Actors including Alan Bates, Ruth Negga and Ed Stoppard have all performed at the house. Margaret Thatcher also used the house for a conference while she was Prime Minister and George II of Greece spent time at the house.

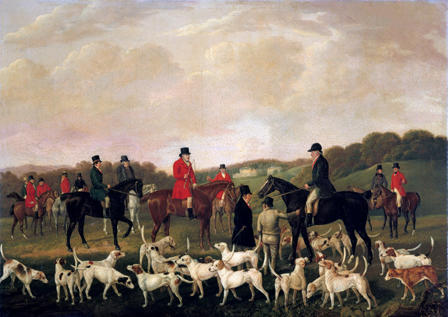
'The Llanharan Hunt (1840)

Llanharan house has a strong historical connection with fox hunting. This Welsh pack was named The Llanharan and was established by Richard Hoare Jenkins in 1805, though the pack was renamed the Llangeinor during the period when Mr John Blandy Jenkins was the squire.

The Llangeinor is now based in Coity near Bridgend.
