= Cumbria Community Foundation =

UK charity

Cumbria Community Foundation (CCF) is a registered charity and community foundation. CCF has granted over £21 million to more than 4,000 community projects across Cumbria. CCF is run by a board of trustees who are elected annually by members of the foundation.

Cumbria Community Foundation is one of 54 Community Foundations in the UK. These Foundations are all members of the umbrella organisation UK Community Foundations

== Mission ==
Cumbria Community Foundation exists to tackle poverty and disadvantage and improve the quality of community life for the people of Cumbria by:

- Raising money and making grants
- Responding quickly to emerging need
- Working in partnership with donors to distribute charitable funds

== History ==
The foundation was launched in 1999, when, with the backing of all seven, British Nuclear fuels donated £1m. Two years previous to this, in 1997, John Fryer-Spedding CBE, then High Sheriff of Cumbria, recruited a steering group to assess the feasibility of Cumbria having its own foundation.

== Grant making ==
Funds are raised from private and personal donations, businesses, philanthropists and trusts. Funds are distributed to local charities and community projects, in particular those that benefit:

- Children and young people
- People with special needs and other disabilities
- Older people
- Disadvantaged people
- Artistic, sporting and cultural life

A list of all the current grant schemes managed by Cumbria Community Foundation are available on the website

- Anyone can aid the work of CCF:
- Making a general donation
- Leaving a legacy
- Setting up a named fund
- Sponsorship for events
- Payroll giving
- Volunteering
