= Lydia White (disambiguation) =

Lydia White is an English linguist and educator.

Lydia White may also refer to:

- Lydia Lucy White, English singer
- Lydia Rogers White (died 1827), literary hostess in London
- Lydia White (beauty pageant contestant), Miss American Beauty 1963

== See also ==
- Lydia White Shattuck (1822–1889), American botanist
