= David Percy Davies =

British newspaper editor (1891–1946)

David Percy Davies (25 October 1891 – 15 October 1946) was a British newspaper editor.

Davies studied at Llandovery College, and joined the Welch Regiment in 1910. He also entered journalism, working at the South Wales Daily Post, then later moved to George Newnes in London. During World War I, he served as a major with the XI Corps Cyclist Battalion. In 1919, he returned to the UK as a sub-editor at the News of the World. In 1933, he was promoted to become Deputy Editor, and he was appointed as a Director of the newspaper in 1935, then finally as Editor in 1941, serving until his death in 1946. He also served as High Sheriff of Glamorgan, in 1943/44.
