= John Bassett (died 1551) =

Welsh lawyer and MP

John Bassett (by 1513 – 20 July 1551), was a Welsh politician.

He was the eldest son of Thomas Bassett of Llantrithyd and was educated at the Inner Temple (1527).

He was joint attorney-general of Glamorgan from 1535 until his death and a member of the council of Queen Katherine Parr and surveyor of her lands by 1544. He was appointed High Sheriff of Glamorgan for 1545–46.

He was a Member (MP) of the Parliament of England for Cardiff Boroughs in 1542, Old Sarum in 1545 and Glamorganshire in 1547. He served as solicitor to the Council of the Marches of Wales by his death.

He married twice: firstly Alice, the daughter of Thomas Love of Dinas Powis, Glamorgan, with whom he had two sons and two daughters and secondly Elizabeth, the daughter of Andrew Norton of Bristol, with whom he had another daughter.

== Sources ==
- "BASSETT, John II (by 1513-51), of Llantrithyd and Pencoed, Glam. and the Inner Temple, London". History of Parliament Online.
