= Jeremiah Homfray =

English ironmaster

Sir Jeremiah Homfray (16 February 1759 – 9 January 1833) was an English ironmaster, best known for mineral developments in South Wales for and starting the Ebbw Vale ironworks.

== Early life ==
The third son of Francis Homfray of Stourton Castle, joint owner with his younger brothers (Thomas and Samuel) of the Penydarren Ironworks. On the death of his father, he was made co-owner and joint Managing Director of the ironworks with his brother Samuel Homfray, M.P., of Coworth Park, Berkshire.

In 1787, he married Mary, the daughter of John Richards, of Llandaff, and after this for many years resided at Llandaff House.

== Ebbw Vale Ironworks ==
In 1789, Walter Watkins was the owner of a forge at the Clydach Ironworks in Glangrwney, Clydach Vale near Crickhowell, which lacked an adequate supply of pig iron. In agreement with two business partners, his son-in-law Charles Cracroft and Jeremiah Homfray, the three leased land at Pen y cae farm in the parish of Aberystruth from John Miles. Situated on the northern tip of the South Wales coalfield, with iron ore obtainable from patch working, and located next to the Ebbw fawr river, they had easy access to the basic iron making materials: coal and iron ore locally mined, plus water and power from the river. Limestone was to be transported by mule train from Llanelly Hill in Blaenavon. The partnership erected a single blast furnace and casting shop against the hillside, which created an output of 25 tons of pig iron per week. Called "Pen y cae" after the original river by the locals, the partners Anglicanised the rivers name to the Ebbw Vale Furnace Company, hence naming both the works and the developing township.

In 1793, Homfray bought out his partners with help from the Bristol-based Quaker family Harford Partridge & Co. He had continued his associated with Penydarren, but after an argument with his co-owning brother Samuel, in 1796 gave up his shares after legal action for an agreed annuity of £2,500 for life. To pay his legal bills from the dispute with his brother, Jeremiah sold the Ebbw Vale ironworks to the Harford family. They subsequently employed him as the salaried superintendent of the works, which he undertook until 1799.

== Subsequent career ==
In 1800, he began to develop the business scheme format in which he would become best known: speculating by taking mineral leases on plots of land; making tests drillings to prove the riches below, often with engineering partner Birch; and then seeking development partners or selling onwards for a profit. Using this form, in 1800 he leased initial lands at Abernant in the Aberdare Valley, and then further leases of mineral rights at additional land in Abernant, Cwmbach, and Rhigos. These were then all sold as a package to the Tappendens. Monies from this sale allowed him to buy into the Hirwaun Ironworks, but he soon quit this project to go back to mineral lease speculation.

== High Sheriff of Glamorgan ==
By 1813, he had accumulated holdings that included: £2,500 annuity from Penydarren; £120 annuity from the Abernant Ironworks; numerous mineral leases in most of the South Wales valleys; and various farm leases in preparation for test drilling for minerals. In 1810 he been appointed High Sheriff of Glamorgan for a year, and his resultant extensive entertainment expenditure plus a large family placed extreme stress on his finances.

== Bankruptcy and later life ==
In November 1813, Sir Jeremiah Homfray "of Cwm Rhondda, coal-merchant, dealer, and chapman" was declared bankrupt. Ordered to sell his house and its contents, the family left for Boulogne, France to avoid paying all of his creditors and enable them to live on his reduced income.

After the death of his wife in 1830, Homfray died and was buried in Boulogne, France, in 1833. His son John Homfray then returned to South Wales, and bought Penllyn Castle.
