= Arun Midha =

British academic (born 1964)

Arun Daniel Midha (born 24 April 1964) is a British academic, who has sat as a lay member on the General Medical Council and currently sits on the Audience Council Wales and the Welsh Language Board, having learnt the language as an adult.

== Education ==
Midha was educated at Gowerton Comprehensive School, Exeter College, Oxford, Cardiff Business School and Swansea University. He completed his PhD in the 1990s.

== Career ==
Until 2009, he was responsible for strategic and business planning of postgraduate medical and dental education in Wales at the School of Postgraduate Medical and Dental Education at Cardiff University.

Midha has undertaken non-executive and lay member roles in a number of fields including regulation, professional conduct, standards and governance.

On 4 April 2012, Arun was appointed High Sheriff of South Glamorgan.

In 2022, The Boundary Commission for Wales announced a panel of Assistant Commissioners to lead public hearings and Midha was named on the panel of four.
