= Ronald Sugden =

English cricketer and Royal Air Force officer

Group Captain Ronald Sugden CBE AFC
- Born: Ronald Scott Sugden; 25 May 1896; Aintree, Lancashire, England
- Died: 26 March 1971 (aged 74); Dinas Powys, Glamorgan, Wales
- Cricket career

Cricket information
- Batting: Unknown
- Bowling: Unknown

Career statistics
Competition	First-class
Matches	2
Runs scored	17
Batting average	5.66
100s/50s	–/–
Top score	12
Balls bowled	90
Wickets	0
Bowling average	–
5 wickets in innings	–
10 wickets in match	–
Best bowling	–
Catches/stumpings	–/–
- Source: Cricinfo, 21 March 2019

Ronald Scott Sugden CBE AFC (25 May 1896 – 26 March 1971) was a Royal Air Force officer and English first-class cricketer. He initially served in the Royal Navy during the First World War, transferring in 1916 to the Royal Naval Air Service. With the merger of the Royal Naval Air Service into the newly formed Royal Air Force in April 1918, Sugden was transferred into the newly founded service. He won the Air Force Cross in the latter stages of the war, and later played first-class cricket for the Royal Air Force cricket team. He served during the Second World War and, following his retirement, served as the High Sheriff of Glamorgan in 1957.

== Life and military career ==
Sugden served in the Royal Navy during the First World War, holding the rank of sub-lieutenant in September 1916. By December 1916, he was serving in the Royal Naval Air Service as a flight lieutenant. Holding the rank of captain on the Royal Air Force by December 1918, Sugden was awarded the Air Force Cross in the 1919 New Year Honours. He was demobilised in September 1920, at which point he held the rank of flight lieutenant. He was restored to service in July 1921.

He later made his debut in first-class cricket for the Royal Air Force cricket team against the Royal Navy at Chatham in 1929. He made a second first-class appearance in 1930 against the Army at The Oval. He held the rank of wing commander prior to the start of the Second World War, during which he was promoted to the rank of group captain in March 1940. He was mentioned in dispatches in January 1945. He was made a CBE in the 1945 Birthday Honours. He retired from active service in June 1946, retaining the rank of group captain.

He was nominated for the ceremonial role of High Sheriff of Glamorgan in 1955, though ultimately it went to Charles Reginald Wheeler. He was again nominated in November 1955, but was again unsuccessful. He was successfully nominated in November 1956, serving as High Sheriff of Glamorgan for 1957. He died in March 1971 at Dinas Powys, Glamorgan.
