= Beverley Humphreys =

Welsh singer

Beverley Humphreys MBE
- Born: Beverley Anne Humphreys; Pontypridd, Wales
- Genres: Opera; Traditional
- Occupation: Singer
- Instrument: Vocals
- Years active: 1960s–present

Beverley Anne Humphreys, MBE (born November 1947), is a Welsh operatic and concert soprano and broadcaster. She has become known for her work with refugees and in 2022 was awarded the MBE for "services to Community Cohesion and Broadcasting".

Humphreys comes from Pontypridd and began her singing career with Welsh National Opera. She has performed and toured in several one-woman shows, including Seven Women under One Hat, A Tribute to Ivor Novello, With Melody in Mind and Legendary Ladies – Judy Garland, Gertrude Lawrence and Marlene Dietrich.

In 1992 Humphreys became the first singer to lead rugby crowds at the National Stadium in Cardiff in the singing of the Welsh national anthem. In 2010 she was appointed High Sheriff of Mid Glamorgan. In the early 2000s she organised an exhibition called "Let Paul Robeson Sing!" to commemorate Paul Robeson's links with Wales.

Humphreys presents music programmes on BBC Radio Wales, and has presented the BBC Cardiff Singer of the World competition for radio on several occasions. In addition, Humphreys has coached 'Beverley United' football team from Pontypridd, 6 August 2019.
