= Gowerton Comprehensive School =

Location
- Cecil Road; Gowerton, Swansea, SA4 3DL; Wales; 51.64263°N 4.03617°W

Information
- Type: Comprehensive
- Motto: "Mi ddylwn, mi allaf, mi fynnaf" English translation:- "I should, I can, I shall"
- Established: 5 October 1896
- Local authority: Swansea
- Headteacher: Kathleen Lawlor
- Staff: 129
- Gender: Coeducational
- Age: 11 to 19
- Enrolment: 1145 (2024)
- Colours: Maroon, white and black
- Former name: Gowerton Boys' Grammar School; Gowerton Girls' Grammar school
- Website: gowerton-school.j2bloggy.com

Gowerton School is a comprehensive secondary school located in Gowerton, Swansea, Wales.

== Intermediate School ==
The school opened on 5 October 1896 in Talbot Street as a co-educational Intermediate school under the Welsh Intermediate Education Act 1889. Later it became Gowerton County School administered by the local (county) authority.

== Grammar school ==
In May 1940, the Talbot Street school became a boys' grammar school when a girls' grammar school opened on Cecil Road.

== Comprehensive ==
The school in its present form was created in 1973 from the merger of Gowerton Girls' Grammar School and Gowerton Boys' Grammar School. The Upper School was at Cecil Road and the Middle School was on Talbot Road. In 1987, the school was centralised on the Cecil Road (former girls' school) site.

Gowerton School today serves pupils from the north and west of the Gower peninsula and from the Swansea suburbs of Gowerton, Waunarlwydd and Dunvant from age 11 to 18, with a successful sixth form specialising in A level and Welsh Baccalaureate courses.

ESTYN inspections in 1994, 2000, 2005, 2011 and 2017 have been consistently good. The 2011 inspection report under the new Welsh inspection framework noted the school's outstanding ethos, inspiring leadership, good performance and excellent prospects, with high academic expectations and achievements, excellent care for pupil welfare and sector leading use of ICT in teaching.

In July 2013, parents supported boys wearing skirts as they had not been permitted to wear school shorts or to roll their trousers up during particularly hot summer weather.

== Location ==
The school is located off Cecil Road in Gowerton. Opposite the school's entrance on Park Road is Ysgol Gyfun Gŵyr, a Welsh speaking school that used to house the Boys' Grammar School.

== Notable alumni and staff ==
=== Staff ===
- Nia Griffith (born 1956), politician

=== Pupils ===
- Dan Biggar (born 1989), rugby player
- Tracy Edwards (born 1962), sailor
- Huw Irranca-Davies (born 1963), politician
- Steve Lovell (born 1960), footballer
- Arun Midha (born 1964), academic
- David Weatherley (born 1972), rugby player
- Andy Williams (born 1981), rugby player
- Liam Williams (born 1991), rugby player

=== Alumni of Gowerton Grammar School ===
- John Bowen (1876–1965), trade unionist and politician
- Willie Davies (1916–2002), rugby player
- Haydn Tanner (1917–2002), rugby player
- Onllwyn Brace (1932–2013), rugby player
- Alun Talfan Davies (1913–2000), judge and publisher
- Ifor Davies (1910–1982), politician
- Islwyn Davies (1909–1981), priest
- Roy Evans (1931–2010), trade unionist
- Gwyn Francis (1896–1987), rugby player
- Norman Gale (1939–2005), rugby player
- Walter Glynne (1890–1970), opera singer
- Bryan Grenfell (born 1954), biologist
- Clive Griffiths (born 1954), rugby player
- Rowe Harding (1901–1991), rugby player
- Edwina Hart (born 1957), politician
- Frederick Higginson: (1913–2003), flying ace
- Alun Hoddinott (1929–2008), composer
- Leighton James (1953–2024), footballer
- Karl Jenkins (born 1944), composer
- Lewis Jones (1931–2004), rugby player
- Peter Kokelaar, volcanologist
- Ieuan Maddock (1917–1988), Welsh scientist and nuclear researcher
- John Maddox (1925–2009), chemist, physicist, journalist and editor
- Alan Morgan (1940–2011), bishop
- Dennis O'Neill (born 1948), opera singer
- John Pook (born 1942), poet
- Gareth Roberts (born 1959), rugby player
- Ceri Richards (1903–1971), artist
- Don Shepherd (1927–2017), cricketer
- Peter Stead (born 1943), writer, broadcaster and historian
- John Sparkes (born 1954), comedian
- Haydn Tanner (1917–2009), rugby player
- Bleddyn Taylor (born 1959), rugby player
- Gwyn Thomas (born 1957), footballer
- Derrick Walters (1932–2001), priest
- David Williams, mathematician
- Byron Davies, Baron Davies of Gower (born 1952), politician
