= High Sheriff of Humberside =

Ceremonial officer in England, 1974–1996

The High Sheriff of Humberside was a High Sheriff title which was in existence from 1974 until 1996, covering the county of Humberside, England.

The county of Humberside was formed from most of the East Riding of Yorkshire and parts of Lincolnshire in 1974 by the Local Government Act 1972 and was served by its own High Sheriff, replacing the High Sheriff of Yorkshire and High Sheriff of Lincolnshire. The county was abolished in 1996 and since that time various parts have been merged into the High Sheriff of the East Riding of Yorkshire and High Sheriff of Lincolnshire titles.

Below is a list of the sheriffs.

== List of High Sheriffs ==
- 1974–1975 John Godfrey Fisher, of Gunnerby House, Hatcliffe, Grimsby.
- 1975–1976 Colonel Rupert Alexander Alec-Smith, TD, of The Red Hall, Winestead, Kingston-upon-Hull.
- 1976–1977 Richard Anthony Bethell, of Rise Park, Kingston-upon-Hull.
- 1977–1978 Norman Jackson, of Ermine House, Appleby, Scunthorpe.
- 1978–1979 Angus Jeremy Christopher Hildyard, of The White Hall, Winestead, Kingston-upon-Hull.
- 1979–1980 John Raleigh Charles Joseph Chichester-Constable, of Burton Constable Hall, Kingston-upon-Hull. landowner and son of Raleigh Chichester-Constable
- 1980–1981 Richard Anthony Bellamy, of Parklands, Barnoldby-Le-Beck, Grimsby.
- 1981–1982 Stephen Hargreaves Hall, of High Hall, Etton, Beverley.
- 1982–1983 Robert Leslie Holtby, of Dowthorpe Hall, Skirlaugh, Kingston-upon-Hull.
- 1983–1984 David Ernest Addison, of The Manor House, Irby-upon-Humber, Grimsby.
- 1984–1985 James Gordon Gordon, of Copper Hill, Elloughton, North Humberside.
- 1985–1986 Joseph Henry Goodhart, of Great Givendale, Pocklington, York.
- 1986–1987 William Frank Somerville Letten, of The Grange, Healing, Grimsby.
- 1987–1988 Peter Bentham Oughtred, of Raby Lodge, 216 Cave Road, Brough.
- 1988–1989 Sir Ian Godfrey Bosville Macdonald of Sleat., of Thorpe Hall, Rudston, Driffield.
- 1989–1990 John Ellerker Spilman, of Aylesby Manor, Grimsby.
- 1990–1991 Geoffrey Alan Marr, of The Old Rectory, Sigglesthorne, Hull.
- 1991–1992 Richard Marriott, of Boynton Hall, Bridlington.
- 1992–1993 John Westland Antony Clugston, of The Old Vicarage, Scawby, Brigg.
- 1993–1994 Peter William Barker, of Swanland Rise, West Ella, Hull.
- 1994–1995 Thomas Wilson Boyd, of Old School House, Etton, Beverley, East Yorkshire.
- 1995–1996 Frank Alan Flear, of Greenacres, 93 High Street, Waltham, Grimsby, South Humberside. Chairman of Grimsby Fish Dock Enterprise Ltd
- 1996–1996 Tom Martin, of Newbegin House, 14 Newbegin, Beverley, North Humberside. (4 days until the abolition of the County)
