= Lydia Rogers White =

- Painting of Lydia Rogers White
- Born: 1760? Bristol
- Died: 1827
- Known for: Literary hostess

Lydia Rogers White (baptised 1760 – January 1827) was a literary hostess in London known for her independence, her wit, her travel, and her reading. Her obituary was first published in 1910.

== Life ==
Lydia Rogers White's birth date is unknown, but she was baptised in 1760 in Bristol. Her mother, Cecil, was an heiress of her brother William Basset of Miskin in Glamorgan. Her father, Stephen White, was the High Sheriff of Glamorgan in 1785. Although she was the youngest daughter, all three surviving children had both riches and connections. Her sister Ann married Francis Saunderson on 28 August 1778, who was a member of parliament and her other sister Mary married John Bennet Popkin.

White's life was reconstructed in 1910 by using the accounts of other notable writers who mention her. The first was Fanny Burney who records that White was threatening suicide in 1780 because of her need for companionship. White was said to be pleasing rather than pretty, and she preferred reading and talking to writing. Six years later she was getting poor regard from Betsy Sheridan, who saw her as a rival for her father, Thomas Sheridan's. affections.

In 1798 she was living at the house of Sir Joshua Reynolds. The writer and banker Samuel Rogers said she had an income of £1,200 per year and he is said to have contemplated marriage. White's father had died the year before and made all of his daughters financially independent. Lydia had devoted two years to caring for her father whilst her wit was missed at the fashionable Bath Pump Room. White met the poet Lord Byron as his admirer Lady Caroline Lamb as they used her salon as a place to meet each other. Walter Scott said of White that she was "what Oxonians call a lioness of the first order, with stockings nineteen times nine dyed blue, very lively, very good-humoured, and extremely absurd". She was a society hostess at her house in Grovesnor Square where she competed with the other leading salons run by Baroness Holland, the Countess of Cork and Lady Davy for guests. White's celebrity guests were usually from the literary set.

White went on a tour of Europe. In 1815 she was in Paris and the following year in Florence. In 1818 she was in Switzerland and Italy, and in 1819 she was again in Italy. She was said to have "set her cap" at both Jean Charles Léonard de Sismondi and the historian William Gell, but neither of these plans was successful.

White's plans were foreshortened when her legs became swollen. However, disabled by dropsy, she was propped up, and the parties continued at her house for some years. It was said that although she died in January 1827, her guests turned up as usual for the party at Saint George Hanover Square, later that week. Her will was dated 26 February 1827.

The facts of her life were gathered together by William Prideaux Courtney but he did not publish his book on "Friends of the Great" until 1910. https://archive.org/details/eightfriendsofgr00cour/page/148. There is also an article about her by W M Parker in the February 1955 Chambers Journal. The article is headed "A Mayfair bluestocking - Lydia White and her Salon. https://archive.org/details/sim_chambers-journal_1955-02_9_2/page/70/mode/2up?q=francis+saunderson
