= Samuel Homfray =

English industrialist

Samuel Homfray (1762 – 22 May 1822) was an English industrialist during the Industrial Revolution in Great Britain, associated with the early iron industry in South Wales.

Samuel was the son of a successful ironmaster, Francis Homfray, and the brother of Jeremiah, Thomas, Jeston, and Francis. With his brothers Jeremiah and Thomas, he took over the lease of Anthony Bacon's cannon foundry at Cyfarthfa, before they began the Penydarren Ironworks during the 1780s. In 1784, after a court case they transferred the lease of the foundry from Anthony Bacon (with whom they had quarrelled), who reassigned it to David Tanner, and moved to where they had set up the works on the banks of the River Morlais, building Penydarren House on the far side river bank. After years of fierce competition with the Dowlais and Cyfarthfa ironworks, they began to prosper. Samuel took over as proprietor of the Penydarren works, while Jeremiah moved to Ebbw Vale.

Samuel was one of the chief promoters of the Glamorgan canal, which opened in 1795 and cost £103,000, of which he subscribed £40,000 and which enabled the transporting of heavy manufactured iron to for onward shipping in the Bristol Channel via the sea lock at the end of the Glamorgan canal. In 1804, Samuel won a 1000 guineas wager with Richard Crawshay as to which of them could first build a steam locomotive for use in their works. Homfray employed Richard Trevithick for this purpose and his locomotive won the bet, hauling five wagons, carrying ten tons of iron and seventy men, at a speed of five miles an hour.

In 1793, Samuel married Jane Morgan, daughter of Sir Charles Gould Morgan, 1st Baronet of Tredegar House, and thus obtained a favourable lease of mineral land at Tredegar in 1800, where he established the Tredegar Ironworks.

In 1813, he was appointed High Sheriff of Monmouthshire and in 1818, returned as Member of Parliament for Stafford borough.

He died 22 May 1822, aged 59 or 60, in London and was buried at St Basil's church in Bassaleg, Newport.

== Family ==
Children of Samuel and Jane Homfray:

- Two sons: Watkin Homfray (1796–1837) and Samuel Homfray the younger (7 December 1795 – 16 November 1883), went into the iron business. Samuel the younger was high sheriff of Monmouthshire in 1841 and alderman of Newport (and mayor, 1854-55)
- Elder Daughter: Amelia married joint owner of the ironworks William Thompson (1793–1854)
- Younger Daughter: Mary, married George Darby, Member of Parliament for East Sussex, and had a family of four sons and eight daughters

== Sources ==
- Welsh Biography Online
- Leigh Rayment's Peerage Pages

Parliament of the United Kingdom
Preceded by Ralph Benson; Thomas Wilson	Member of Parliament for Stafford; 1818–1820; With: Benjamin Benyon	Succeeded by Benjamin Benyon; Sir George Chetwynd
