= Brian Rees =

- Full name: Brian Idris Rees
- Born: 28 August 1942 Neath, Wales
- Died: 29 December 2021 (aged 79) Cardiff, Wales
- School: Neath Grammar School
- University: University of Cambridge
- Notable relative: Geoffrey Rees (brother)
- Occupation: Surgeon

Rugby union career
- Position: Hooker
International career
Years	Team	Apps	(Points)
1967	Wales	3	(0)

Brian Idris Rees OBE (28 August 1942 — 29 December 2021) was a Welsh international rugby union player.

Rees was born in Neath and attended Neath Grammar School, where he learned his rugby. He won four blues while studying at Christ's College and captained Cambridge to a narrow defeat against the touring 1966 Wallabies.

Moving to London to study at St Bartholomew's Hospital, Rees joined the London Welsh club and in 1967 won three Wales caps as a hooker in their Five Nations campaign. He made the 1968 Wales tour of Argentina, for which caps weren't awarded, then earned a call up for their 1969 New Zealand trip, but had to decline due to medical exams.

A surgeon by profession, Rees became the lead cancer clinician at the University Hospital of Wales in Cardiff and was made an Officer of the Order of the British Empire (OBE) in 2000 for services to medicine.

Rees held the ceremonial position of High Sheriff of South Glamorgan in 2008.

== See also ==
- List of Wales national rugby union players
