= Thomas Lewis (died 1594) =

16th-century Welsh politician

Thomas Lewis (by 1533 – 2 November 1594), of The Van, Glamorganshire, was a Welsh politician.

He was a member (MP) of the parliament of England for Monmouth Boroughs in 1555.
