= Francis Homfray =

English industrialist

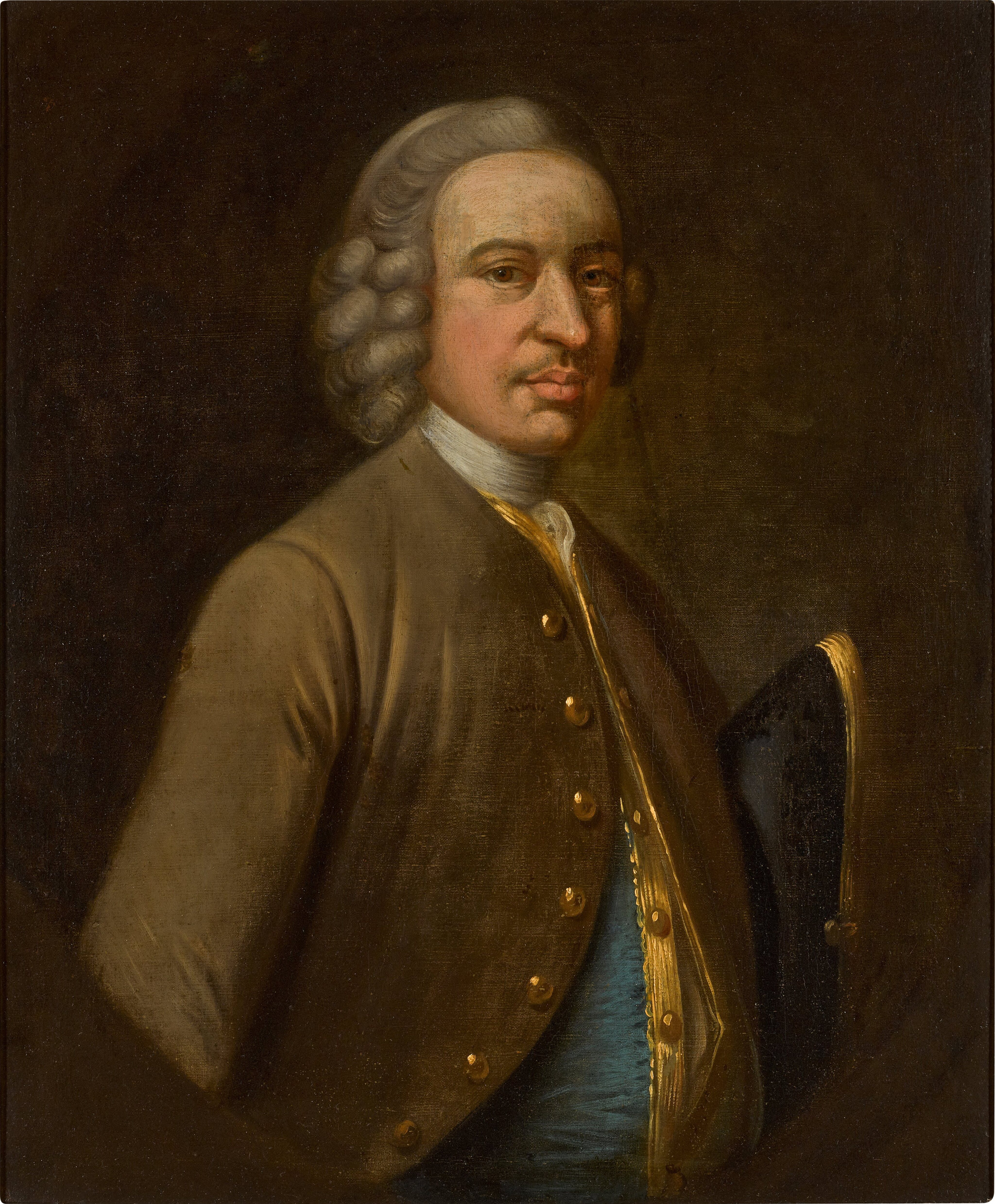
Portrait of Francis Homfray (1729, circle of Francis Hayman)

Francis Homfray (7 September 1725 – 1798) was an English industrialist and one of the founders of the iron industry in South Wales. His father another Francis Homfray established the business, but it was his mother Mary Homfray who kept the business running after he died.

== Life ==
He was the third son of Mary (born Jeston) and Francis Homfray (1674–1736). He came from a village near Rotherham called Wales which was in the county then known as the West Riding of Yorkshire. His mother Mary Jeston (d. 1758) of The Heath, Worcestershire was his father's second wife. His father had been successful in the iron trade in Coalbrookdale, Staffordshire, and he made his home at Wollaston Hall, Worcestershire, and at Stourton Mill. Her father died in 1736 and it was his mother then who ran the business.

He married Hannah Popkin of Coytrahen, near Bridgend, Glamorgan. He approached Anthony Bacon (with whom he subsequently quarrelled) in September 1782 and leased an ironworks from him, to be used mainly for manufacturing weapons and ammunitions. His three younger sons were employed there: Thomas, Jeremiah, and Samuel Homfray. The eventual result was the establishment of the Penydarren works at Merthyr Tydfil. Welsh iron production went from 4000 tons per year in 1750 to 80000 in 1815.

== Sources ==
- Welsh Biography Online
- Homfray Family Tree
