= Penllyn Castle =

Castle in the Vale of Glamorgan, Wales

Coordinates: 51.474612°N 3.471911°W

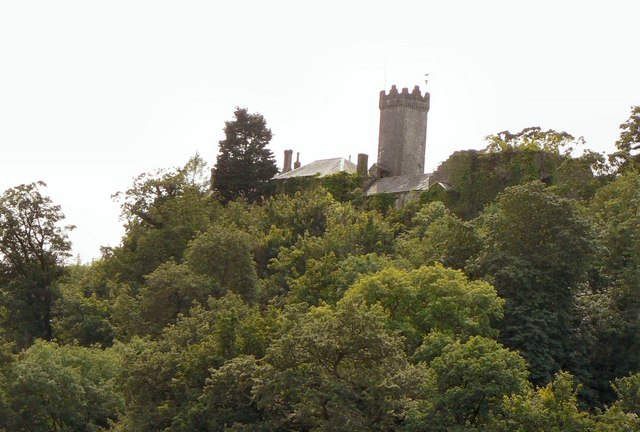
Penllyn Castle, Cowbridge. The castle has views of the surrounding area

Penllyn Castle is a Norman-style country house, dating mainly from the Victorian period, located in Cowbridge, 4 miles (6.4 km) south-east of Bridgend, South Wales.

Built by Robert Fitzhamon in 1135, the sheriff Earl of Gloucester, it shares an oblong tower like contemporary Ogmore Castle. The high-location was chosen as it gave clear-view over both the River Thaw and Ewenny River valleys.

Reportedly attacked by Owain Glyndŵr, today the two surviving main walls of the original castle stand on the edge of a low cliff above the River Thaw. They include near the base six courses of "herringbone" masonry, a feature of early Norman construction. These add to the academic theory that the castle was one of the first Norman structures built during Fitzhamon's occupation of Glamorgan.

In Tudor times, the Turbeville family built a manor house in the residual grounds, for which the former castle keep forms one corner. In the 1790s, a new manor house was built by Miss Gwinnett between 1780 and 1790, and the old house which now lies derelict converted into a stable block.

In 1846, after his return from Boulogne, France, where his father, ironmaster Jeremiah Homfray, had been living in order to escape his creditors after his bankruptcy, the castle was bought by John Homfray. Using a "Tudorbethan"-style to match the previous works undertaken by the Turbeville family, he rebuilt the estate between 1846 and 1860. This included the construction of a new entrance lodge, which today itself is a Grade I listed building as part of the estates group value. Homfray demolished most of Miss Gwinnett's manor house, and rebuilt it in a contemporary Victorian architecture style with stucco-plaster walls, which itself today is only Grade II listed.

The castle was sold to the Cory family in 1961 in order to pay death duties. The castle is not accessible to the public.

In 2005, the semi-derelict castle stable block and manor house were both used as the main shooting location for Tooth and Claw, the second episode of the second series of the resurrected BBC One television series Doctor Who. The castle was set as a Victorian-era Scottish castle, home to some monks who were playing host to Queen Victoria.

The castle was sold in October 2018 to Terence and Judith Edgell with a view to restoring it to its former glory and using it as their family home.
