= High Sheriff of Clwyd =

Welsh county ceremonial officer

The office of High Sheriff of Clwyd was established in 1974 as part of the creation of the county of Clwyd in Wales following the Local Government Act 1972, and effectively replaced the shrievalties of the amalgamated counties of Flintshire and Denbighshire.

== High Sheriffs of Clwyd ==
- 1974 Philip John Warburton-Lee of Broad Oak, Whitchurch, Salop.
- 1975 John Wynne Bankes of Mynachlog, Northop.
- 1976 William Reinallt Williams of Llewesog Hall, Prion, near Denbigh.
- 1977 Sir John Wyndham Edward Hanmer, 8th Baronet of The Mere House, Hanmer, Whitchurch
- 1978 Patrick Beaumont, of Donadea Lodge, Babell.
- 1979 Raffaello William Biagi of Coed Coppi Fancer, Llandyrnog.
- 1980 David Foulk Myddleton of Caeaugwynion Farm, Chirk.
- 1981 Marigold Evelyn Graham of Plas-yn-Rhos, Ruthin.
- 1982 Arthur David Bentley Brooks of Higher Barns, Malpas, Cheshire
- 1983 Major Thomas Smith of Gwaenynog, Denbigh.
- 1984 David Humphrey Griffith of Garthmeilio, Llangwm.
- 1985 Noreen Louisa Edwards of Pine Trees, Llanrwst Road, Upper Colwyn Bay
- 1986 Lloyd Tyrell-Kenyon, of Gredington Park, Hanmer, Flintshire
- 1987 Geoffrey Laird Jackson of Plas Newydd, Llanfair Dyffryn Clwyd, Ruthin.
- 1988 Hugh Simon Fetherstonhaugh of Faenol Bach, Bodelwyddan, Rhyl.
- 1989 David Mars-Jones of LLansannan, Denbigh.
- 1990 Sir Watkin Williams-Wynn, 11th Baronet of Plas-yn-Cefn, St. Asaph.
- 1991 Philip Peter Davies-Cooke of Gwysaney Hall, Mold.
- 1992 Robert Gwynn Hughes of Brook House Farm, Denbigh.
- 1993 Philip Caulfield Godsal of Iscoyd Park, Wrexham
- 1994 Captain Nicholas Montgomery Archdale of Penbedw, Nannerch, Mold.
- 1995 William Field Glazebrook of Pontruffydd Hall, Bodfari, Denbigh
- 1996 Roger Henry William Graham-Palmer of Cefn Park, Wrexham.
- 1997 Sir Charles Douglas Lowther, 6th Baronet of Erbistock Hall, Wrexham
- 1998 Colonel Henry Michael Edward Cadogan of Fron Isaf, Pentre Celyn, Ruthin.
- 1999 Derwen Eurfyl Williams of Plas Yn Cwm, St Asaph, Denbighshire
- 2000 Maurice Carstairs Jones-Mortimer of Hartsheath, Mold, Flintshire
- 2001 Robert John Best of Plas Yn Vivod, Llangollen.
- 2002 Commander Francis John Cadman Bradshaw of Rhagatt Hall, Carrog, Corwen.
- 2003 Nicholas David Bankes of Cilcain, near Mold.
- 2004 Dr Julia Helen O'Hara of Padeswood, Near Mold
- 2005 Harold Michael Clunie Cunningham
- 2006 Susan Gordon Hudson
- 2007 Jonathan Patrick Neale Major
- 2008 Stephen Dudley Cheshire of Denbigh
- 2009 Henry Geoffrey Robertson of Corwen
- 2010 Lady Janet Jones of Hawarden
- 2011 Edmund Francis Lloyd FitzHugh of Wrexham
- 2012 Henry Michael Dixon of Llangynhafal, Denbigh
- 2013 Celia Jenkins of Llangollen
- 2014 John David Meredith Jones of The Old Rectory, Bodfari, Denbigh
- 2015 Janet Patricia Evans of Llanrwst, Conwy
- 2016 James Peter O'Toole of Cwm Dyserth, Rhyl
- 2017 Charlotte Henrietta Gaylyn Howard (née Whitelocke-Winter) of Llandyrnog, Denbigh
- 2018 Lady Hanmer (née Elizabeth Taylor) of Whitchurch
- 2019 Stephanie Lynne Catherall of Nercwys, Near Mold
- 2020 David Heneage Wynne-Finch of Bettws-y-Coed
- 2021 John Stephen Thomas of St Asaph
- 2022: Zoe Jane Henderson of Ruthin
- 2023: Kate Louise Hill-Trevor (née Lord) of Brynkinalt Hall, Chirk (
- 2024: Karen Ann Farrell-Thornley, of Conwy
- 2025: Julie Annette Gilbanks, of Buckley
- 2026: David Baden Jones, of Ruthin

== See also ==
- High Sheriff of Flintshire
- High Sheriff of Denbighshire
