= High Sheriff of Cumbria =

English ceremonial officer

The high sheriff is the oldest secular office under the Crown. Formerly the high sheriff was the principal law enforcement officer in the county but over the centuries most of the responsibilities associated with the post have been transferred elsewhere or are now defunct, so that its functions are now largely ceremonial. The high sheriff changes every April.

The position of High Sheriff of Cumbria has existed since the creation of the non-metropolitan and ceremonial county of Cumbria in 1974 which saw the abolition of the former shrievalties of Cumberland and Westmorland. As well as Cumberland and Westmorland Cumbria also includes former parts of Lancashire and the West Riding of Yorkshire.

The non-metropolitan county of Cumbria was abolished on 1 April 2023 and replaced with two unitary authorities known as Cumberland and Westmorland and Furness. The two new unitary authorities continue to constitute a ceremonial county named "Cumbria" for the purpose of lieutenancy and shrievalties, being presided over by a Lord Lieutenant of Cumbria and a High Sheriff of Cumbria.

== List of high sheriffs ==
- 1974: George Nigel Fancourt Wingate, of Bridge End House, Cockermouth
- 1975: Michael Charles Stanley, of Halecat, Witherslack, Grange-over-Sands
- 1976: Joseph Hugh Harris, of Brackenburgh, Calthwaite, Penrith
- 1977: Edward Hubert Fleming-Smith, of Hawksdale Hall, Dalston, Carlisle
- 1978: Richard Hugh Cavendish, of Holker Hall
- 1979: Stafford Vaughan Stepney Howard, of Greystoke Castle, Penrith
- 1980: Charles Henry Bagot, of Levens Hall
- 1981: Timothy Ross Fetherstonhaugh, of The College, Kirkoswald, Penrith
- 1982: William John Montague Chaplin of Finsthwaite House, Ulverston
- 1983: Peter Eric Fyers Crewdson of Summerhow, Kendal
- 1984: Edward Peter Ecroyd, of Low House, Armathwaite, Carlisle
- 1985: Major Antony James Robinson Harrison, of Wreay Hall, Wreay, Carlisle
- 1986: Major Nigel James Clarkson Webb, of Buckstone House, Burton-in-Kendal, via Carnforth, Lancs.
- 1987: William Victor Gubbins, of Eden Lacy, Lazonby, Penrith
- 1988: Roger Brockbank, of Common Head, Staveley, Kendal
- 1989: Major Timothy Richard Riley, of Burbank House, Blencowe, Penrith
- 1990: Thomas Peter Naylor, of The Clock House, Far Sawrey, Ambleside
- 1991: Ian Cufaude Carr, of Brown Hill, Walton, Brampton
- 1992: Myles Christopher Ross Sandys, of Graythwaite Hall, Ulverston
- 1993: Margaret Washington
- 1994: Frederick John Richard Boddy, of Curwen Woods, Burton
- 1995: Hugh William Lawson, of Croplands, Heads Nook, Carlisle
- 1996: Henry Charles Fraser Bowring, of Whelprigg House, Barbon
- 1997: John Henry Fryer-Spedding, Mirehouse, Keswick
- 1998: Simon Philip Pease, Underley Grange, Kirkby Lonsdale, Carnforth
- 1999: Arthur Ian Bullough, of Friars Garth, Walton, Brampton
- 2000: Lady Hothfield, Drybeck Hall, Appleby
- 2001: Robert Bryce Hasell-McCosh of Dalemain, Pooley Bridge, Penrith
- 2002: David William Trimble, of Deepdale, Dalston, Carlisle
- 2003: Antony Richard Leeming of Skirsgill Park, Penrith
- 2004: Frederick Charles Theodore Markham, Morland House, Morland, Penrith
- 2005: Dr Adam Charles Illingworth Naylor
- 2006: Robert Lawie Frederick Burgess
- 2007: Claire Theresa Hensman
- 2008: Graham William Lamont
- 2009: Elizabeth Honor Susan Thornely
- 2010: James Ronald Carr of Warwick-on-Eden
- 2011: Iona A Frost-Pennington of Ravenglass
- 2012: Juliet Deirdre Jean Westoll, of Longtown.
- 2013: Diana Ruth Matthews of Windermere.
- 2014: Martyn Peter Telford Hart of Bankhead, Newby East, Carlisle.
- 2015: Samuel Miles Alan Rayner of Murley Hill, Oxenholme Road, Kendal.
- 2016: (Group Captain) (Thomas) Richard Lee (RAF rtd) of Egremont
- 2017: Alistair George Milne Wannop of Linstock, Carlisle.
- 2018: Simon Frederick Michael Berry of Windermere.
- 2019: Marcia Elaine Reid Fotheringham, of Brampton.
- 2020: Julie Elizabeth Barton of Ulverston.
- 2021: David George Beeby of Cockermouth
- 2022: Alan McViety
- 2023: Samantha Scott
- 2024: Christopher Nigel Couper Holmes, Carlisle
- 2025: Dr. Geoffrey Charles Joliffe, Barrow in Furness
- 2026: Shirley Fawcett, Workington
