= High Sheriff of Gwynedd =

Welsh county ceremonial officer

The office of High Sheriff of Gwynedd was established in 1974 as part of the creation of the county of Gwynedd in Wales following the Local Government Act 1972, and effectively replaced the shrievalties of the amalgamated counties of Anglesey, Caernarfonshire and Merionethshire.

The office of High Sheriff of Gwynedd forms part of The High Sheriffs' Association of England and Wales.

== High Sheriffs of Gwynedd ==
- 1974–1975: Captain Somerville Travers Alexander Livingstone-Learmonth of Tan-yr-Allt, Tremadog, Porthmadog.
- 1975–1976: Robert Sydney Lloyd of Llys Wen Bach, Paradwyhs, Bodorgan.
- 1976–1977: Alfred Cedric Maby of Cae Canol, Minffordd, Penrhyndeudraeth.
- 1977–1978: Robert Gwilym Pritchard-Jones of Coed Hywel, Clynnog Road, Caernarvon.
- 1978–1979: Thomas Stanley Carpenter of Carreglwyd, Llanfaethlu.
- 1979–1980: Cdr Hamilton Ridler of Wern-y-Wylan, near Beaumaris.
- 1980–1981: Gwilym Prys Davies of Castellmai, Caeathro, Caernarfon.
- 1981–1982: Squadron Leader Jack Grenville Kerby of Westbury Mount, Holyhead.
- 1982–1983: Richard Ellis Meuric Rees of Escuan Hall, Tywyn.
- 1983–1984: Ivor Wyn Jones, of Geirian, Pengelli Wyn, Caernarfon.
- 1984–1985: Wing Commander Robert Woodward Turner of Angorfa, Red Wharf Bay, Anglesey.
- 1985–1986: Dr David Eryl Meredith of Ty'nycae, Dolgellau
- 1986–1987: Peter Arnold Sturrock of Bryn Farm, Caernarfon.
- 1987–1988: Owen Gwilym Thomas of Chwaen Goch, Llanerchymedd, Anglesey.
- 1988–1989: Owen Morris Jonathan of Isallt, Porthmadog Road, Criccieth.
- 1989–1990: Hywel Francis Richards of Glanllynnau, Chwilog, Pwllheli.
- 1990–1991: Tessa Gillian Rosamond Preece (née Williams), of Plas Llanddyfnan, Talwrn, Anglesey.
- 1991–1992: Robert Gwilym Lewis-Jones of ManSiriol, Cae Deintur, Dolgellau.
- 1992–1993: Annwen Carey-Evans of Eisteddfa, Pentre Felin, Criccieth.
- 1993–1994: Sir Richard Thomas Williams-Bulkeley, 14th Baronet
- 1994–1995: Robert Hefin Davies of Bryn Awel, Blaenau Ffestiniog.
- 1995–1996: William Wyn Roberts of Pinas, The Beach, Port Dinorwic
- 1996–1997: Major David Owen Carpenter of Rhosneigr, Anglesey
- 1997–1998: Ella Wynne Jones of Llandecwyn, Talsarnau.
- 1998–1999: Professor Eric Sunderland of Ffriddoedd Road, Bangor
- 1999–2000: William David Innes Edwards, Gwredog, Rhosgoch, Amlwch, Anglesey
- 2000–2001: Gerallt Wyn Hughes of Ty’n y Coed, Arthog.
- 2001–2002: Bettina Harden (née Tayleur) of Nanhoron, Pwllheli.
- 2002–2003: Patricia Hughes of Plas Llanfaes, near Beaumaris, Anglesey.
- 2003–2004: Robin John Price of “Rhiwlas” Bala.
- 2004–2005: Jonathan Clough Williams-Ellis of Glasfryn Fawr Farm, Pencaenewydd, Pwllheli
- 2005–2006: Jessamy Rosamund Melhuish Alexander of Llynon Hall, Llamddeusant
- 2006–2007: Richard Andrew Meredyth Richards
- 2007–2008: Dr Dewi Wyn Roberts
- 2008–2009: Peter Rogers
- 2009–2010: Trevor Norman Corbett
- 2010–2011: Griffith Richard Eifion Evans
- 2011–2012: Professor Robin Grove-White
- 2012–2013: Edmund Seymour Bailey of Llanbedr
- 2013–2014: Marian Wyn Jones of Caernarvon
- 2014–2015: David Murray Lea-Wilson of Maes Y Borth, Dwyran, Llanfairpwll, Isle of Anglesey
- 2015–2016: Dr Elizabeth Mary Nesbit Andrews of Aberdyfi
- 2016–2017: Dr Peter Glynne Harlech Jones
- 2017–2018: Professor Siân Hope (née Griffiths) of Llangaffo, Isle of Anglesey
- 2018–2019: Kathryn Kerena Griffiths Ellis (née Davies) of Y Ffor, Pwllheli
- 2019–2020: Susan Moules Jones, Gaerwen, Isle of Anglesey
- 2020–2021: David Eryl Francis Williams of Harlech
- 2021-2022: Gwyn Peredur Owen
- 2022-2023: Davina Carey-Evans
- 2023-2024: Janet Phillips
- 2024-2025: Sarah Jane Foskett, of Harlech
- 2025-2026: Rhys Meirion Davies, of Anglesey
- 2026-2027: Llinos Angharad Owen, of Caernarfon

== See also ==
- High Sheriff of Anglesey
- High Sheriff of Caernarvonshire
- High Sheriff of Merionethshire
