= High Sheriff of West Yorkshire =

Ceremonial officer of West Yorkshire, England

The High Sheriff of West Yorkshire is a current High Sheriff title which has existed since 1974, the holder is changed annually every March. For around 1,000 years the entire area of Yorkshire was covered by a single Sheriff of Yorkshire. After the Local Government Act 1972 the office of Sheriff was changed to High Sheriff and was split to cover several newly created counties, including West Yorkshire.

Below is a list of the high sheriffs for West Yorkshire.

== List of High Sheriffs ==
- 1974–1975 Sir William Peter Bulmer
- 1975–1976 George Francis Lane Fox
- 1976–1977 Michael Edmund Lyon
- 1977–1978 David Gaunt
- 1978–1979 John Malcolm Barr
- 1979–1980 Stephen Gerald Beaumont
- 1980–1981 Robert German Owthwaite
- 1981–1982 Charles Miller Fenton
- 1982–1983 David Fearnley
- 1983–1984 Elizabeth Mary Whitaker
- 1984–1985 Stuart Alan Barr
- 1985–1986 John Lyles
- 1986–1987 Yvonne Brenda Jackson
- 1987–1988 George Cooke Armitage
- 1988–1989 John Richard Marshall Roscoe
- 1989–1990 Victor Hugo Watson of Moat Field, Moor Lane, East Keswick
- 1990–1991 Peter John Dixon Marshall
- 1991–1992 Israel Arnold Ziff of Sandmoor Avenue, Alwoodley, Leeds.
- 1992–1993 David Humphrey Boyle
- 1993–1994 Geoffrey Flockton Armitage
- 1994–1995 Charles Wilfred David Sutcliffe
- 1995–1996 Edward Neil Pullan
- 1996–1997 John Stephen Behrens
- 1997–1998 Frederick Thomas Benson Jowitt
- 1998–1999 John James Edward Brennan
- 1999–2000 Peter Art Hillard Hartley
- 2000–2001 Frank Ramsey Fenton
- 2001–2002 John David Malcolm Stoddart-Scott
- 2002–2003 John Patrick Dent
- 2003–2004 John David Jackson
- 2004–2005 James Edward Barker
- 2005–2006 Timothy James Pitt Hare
- 2006–2007 Roger Frank Dixon Marshall
- 2007–2008 Rhona Christine Hartley
- 2008–2009 Roger Gordon Bowers
- 2009–2010 Jeremy John Burton
- 2010–2011 Richard Robert Clough
- 2011–2012 Anthony Ernest Grant
- 2012–2013 Stephen Robert Davidson
- 2013–2014 Virginia Annable Lloyd
- 2014–2015 Anne Elizabeth Dent
- 2015–2016 Edmund John Seward Anderson of Thorner, Leeds.
- 2016–2017 Christopher John Brown of Sutton-in-Craven, Keighley.
- 2017–2018 Terence George Bramall of Harrogate.
- 2018–2019: Charles Richard Jackson, of Ferrensby, Knaresborough.
- 2019–2020: Paul David Lawrence of Harrogate.
- 2020–2021: Jonathan Henry Thornton of Huddersfield.
- 2021–2022: Clive Roland Lloyd of Luddenden, Halifax
- 2022–2023: Susan Kitty Baker of Leeds
- 2023–2024: Zulfiqar Ali Karim of Shipley
- 2024–2025: Adeeba Malik, of Bradford
- 2025–2026: Christopher John Brown
- 2026–2027: Dr. Ruby Khalid Bhatti, Bradford
