= High Sheriff of Dyfed =

Welsh county ceremonial officer

The office of High Sheriff of Dyfed was established in 1974 as part of the creation of the county of Dyfed in Wales following the Local Government Act 1972, and effectively replaced the shrievalties of the amalgamated counties of Cardiganshire, Carmarthenshire and Pembrokeshire. Since 1996 Dyfed has a purely ceremonial meaning, having been broken up for administrative purposes.

== High Sheriffs of Dyfed ==
- 1974: Colonel John Anthony Sulivan, of Benton Castle, Milford Haven.
- 1975: Dr. David Brynmor Llewellyn-Morgan, of 1 Pare Howard Avenue, Llanelli.
- 1976: Thomas Arfon Owen, of Bryn-Derw, Llanbadarn Fawr, Aberystwyth.
- 1977: Christopher Harold Pemberton, of Vaynor, Narberth.
- 1978: Lieut.-Colonel Gilbert Henry Fleetwood Chaldecott, of Vrynylan, Nantgaredig.
- 1979: Doctor William Joseph St. Ervyl-Glyndwr Rhys, of Plas Bronmeurig, Ystrad Meurig.
- 1980: Colonel William Peter Howells, of White Gates, Little Haven, Haverfordwest
- 1981: William James Hinds of Danyrallt, Abergorlech Road, Carmarthen.
- 1982: Hywel Heulyn Roberts of Synod, Llandysul
- 1983: David Owen John Shoubridge Lorth-Phillips, of Knowles Farm, Lawrenny, Kilgetty.
- 1984: Joseph David Dyfrig Williams, of Penllwyn Park, Carmarthen.
- 1985: Dr John Hedley Cule, of Abereinon, Capel Dewi, Llandysul
- 1986: Thomas Charles Hughes, of First Point, North Cliff, Tenby.
- 1987: Robin William Lewis, of Orchard House, Llanstephan.
- 1988: Griffith Berwyn Williams, of 14 Pendre, Cardigan.
- 1989: Paul John Kaye Speyer of Hill, Narberth
- 1990: Dr. John Henry Thomas Rees, of Kings Park, St. Clears.
- 1991: Sir Geraint Llewellyn Evans, of Trelawney, Aberaeron.
- 1992: George Malcolm Green, of Delapoer Lodge, Dale Road, Haverfordwest.
- 1993: Patrick Rooney
- 1994: Dr John Geraint Jenkins
- 1995: Ieuan Wyn Jones
- 1996: David Clive Jones-Davies of Principal's Residence, Trinity College, Carmarthen.
- 1997: Commander Huw Ceiriog Lloyd-Williams, Plas Trefilan, Llanbedr P.S., Ceredigion.
- 1998: John Seymour Allen-Mirehouse, The Hall, Angle, near Pembroke.
- 1999: Jonathan Michael Griffith Andrews
- 2000: Daniel Gruffydd Jones
- 2001: Richard Harold James, of Clarbeston Road, Pembrokeshire
- 2002: Stephen Patrick Rees of Llanelli.
- 2003: Evan Keith John Evans of Deganwy, Sunny Hill, Llandysul.
- 2004: Norma Beryl Drew of Cwm-Pibau, New Moat, Clarbeston Road, Haverfordwest.
- 2005: John David Alan Thomas
- 2006: Dr Ann Rhys
- 2007: Colonel David Llewellin Davies
- 2008: Claire Mary Mansel Lewis of Llandeilo
- 2009: Gareth Rowlands of Dôl-y-bont
- 2010: David Llewellyn Pryse Lloyd of Narberth
- 2011: Thomas Owen Saunders Lloyd of Dryslwyn
- 2012: Elan Closs Stephens of Aberystwyth
- 2013: John Thomas Davies of Crymych
- 2014: Rachel Elinor Jones of Bethlehem, Llangadog
- 2015: James Wilfrid Poyer Lewis of Llanddewi Velfrey, Narberth, Pembrokeshire
- 2016: Professor Medwin Hughes of Carmarthen
- 2017: Susan Carol Balsom of Aberystwyth, Ceredigion
- 2018: Stephen Mansel Edward Davies of Llanfrynach
- 2019: Anne Helena Jane Lewis of Sir Gar, Carmarthenshire
- 2020: Sharron Kim Lusher of Saundersfoot, Pembrokeshire
- 2021: Jonathan Thomas Gravell of Cydweli
- 2022: David Rowland Rees-Evans of Ceredigion
- 2023: Meurig David Raymond
- 2024: Helen Jones, of Carmarthen
- 2025: Ann Margaret Jones, of Tregaron
- 2026: Andrew Merfyn Phillips, of Haverfordwest

== See also ==
- High Sheriff of Cardiganshire
- High Sheriff of Carmarthenshire
- High Sheriff of Pembrokeshire
