= High Sheriff of the East Riding of Yorkshire =

Ceremonial officer of the English county

The High Sheriff of the East Riding of Yorkshire is a current High Sheriff title which has existed since 1996. For around 1,000 years the entire area of Yorkshire was covered by a single High Sheriff of Yorkshire. After the Local Government Act 1972 the title was split to cover several newly created counties. Most of the former area of the East Riding became part of the county of Humberside and under the High Sheriff of Humberside title. Humberside was abolished in 1996 and a High Sheriff title was created for the newly reconstituted East Riding of Yorkshire.

Below is a list of the sheriffs.

== List of High Sheriffs ==
- 1996–1997 Tom Martin
- 1997–1998 Peter William John Carver of the Croft, North Cave
- 1998–1999 Charles Arnold Maxsted
- 1999–2000 Andrew Leslie Marr
- 2000–2001 Christopher McLaren Oughtred
- 2001–2002 Elizabeth Susan Cunliffe-Lister, of Burton Agnes Hall, Driffield
- 2002–2003 Richard Antony Byass, North Dalton Manor, North Dalton, near Driffield.
- 2003–2004 Hugh Adrian Bethell
- 2004–2005 Rodger Booth
- 2005–2006 Carol Rymer
- 2006–2007 John Bladon
- 2007–2008 Nicholas Hildyard
- 2008–2009 Jonathan Hall
- 2009–2010 Patrick William Farnsworth
- 2010–2011 Adrian Mark Horsley
- 2011–2012 John Holtby
- 2012–2013 Julia Dorothy Good
- 2013–2014 Stephen Thomas Larard
- 2014–2015 Gail Stafford Mettyear
- 2015–2016 James Lawrence Dick of North Ferriby
- 2016–2017 Thomas Gordon Martin
- 2017–2018 Gillian Elizabeth Drewry of Cottingham
- 2018–2019 Deborah Jane Rosenberg of Beverley
- 2019–2020 Susan Marialuisa Lockwood Stephenson of Hotham
- 2020–2021 Andrew Nigel Horncastle of Swanland
- 2021–2022 Edward Richard Shepherdson Esq.
- 2022–2023 Jacqueline Bowes
- 2023–2024 Christina Cerutti
- 2024–2025 Colonel Christopher James Henson, Driffield
- 2025–2026 Michael Rice, Beverley
- 2026–2027 Neil Philip Sanderson, Brough
