= High Sheriff of West Glamorgan =

Welsh county ceremonial officer

The office of High Sheriff of West Glamorgan was established in 1974 as part of the creation of the county of West Glamorgan in Wales following the Local Government Act 1972. Together with the High Sheriff of Mid Glamorgan and the High Sheriff of South Glamorgan, it replaced the office of the High Sheriff of Glamorgan.

In recent years the High Sheriff of West Glamorgan has supported and chaired the CrimeBeat charity.

== High Sheriffs of West Glamorgan ==
- Before 1974 – See High Sheriff of Glamorgan
- 1974: Alan Burnyeat Turnbull of Home Farm, Penrice, Reynoldston
- 1975: Claud Gerald Bellingham of Bishopston, Swansea
- 1976: Martin Thomas of Wern Road, Skewen
- 1977: Commodore Robert Hastie
- 1978: Donald Humphrey Davies of Caswell, Swansea
- 1979: Keith Cyril Austin Bailey of Caswell Bay, Swansea
- 1980: Michael Rowland Godfrey Llewellyn of Glebe House, Penmaen, Swansea
- 1981: Alexander Herbert Lindsey Eccles of Penmaen, Swansea
- 1982: Arthur Gordon Chilcott, of Caswell Road, Mumbles, Swansea
- 1983: David Hunter Andrews of Cefn Bryn House, Penmaen, Swansea
- 1984: Brian Brendan Hickey of Blackpill, Swansea
- 1985: Edward Gwynne Thomas of Caswell Avenue, Mumbles, Swansea
- 1986: Eden Martin Hughes Evans
- 1987: Richard Vernon Watkins
- 1988: Dr Stuart Poole Jenkins
- 1989: Dr Brian Kay Davison
- 1990: John Brian Dickinson Simpson
- 1991: Dr Edward Morgan Roberts
- 1992: William Isaac James
- 1993: Alan Charles Frederick Aylesbury
- 1994: Colin Reginald Rees
- 1995: John Duart Willard MacLean
- 1996: Robert Lewis
- 1997: Paul Jeremy Hodges
- 1998: Robert Hugh Lloyd-Griffiths
- 1999: Henry Alfred Steane
- 2000: Rosalyn Joy Harris of Tredegar Fawr Farm, Llangyfelach, Swansea
- 2001: David Peter Lloyd Davies of Nicholaston, Penmaen, Gower
- 2002: Royston Phelps of Pine Ridge, Southgate, Swansea
- 2003: Jane Elizabeth Clayton of Dolgoy House, West Cross, Swansea
- 2004: David Byron Lewis of Bryn Newydd House, Derwen Fawr Road, Sketty, Swansea
- 2005: Dr Eleanor Mair Williams
- 2006: Philip Llewellyn Hunkin
- 2007: Martin Andrew Trainer
- 2008: Pamela Edith Spender
- 2009: Dr Ronald Bryn John of Port Talbot
- 2010: Rowland William Parry Jones of West Cross
- 2011: Susan Mary Waller Thomas of Caswell
- 2012: William Thomas Hopkins of Caswell
- 2013: Gaynor Marie Richards
- 2014: Martyn Spencer Jenkins of Langland, Swansea
- 2015: Robert Michael Redfern of Glyncasnod, Felindre, Swansea
- 2016: Professor Donna Mead, of Glynneath
- 2017: Roberta Louise Fleet
- 2018: Henry Michael Gilbert of Mumbles
- 2019: Sally Ruth Goldstone, Sketty Green, Swansea
- 2020: Debra Elizabeth Evans-Williams
- 2021: Joanna Lewis Jenkins
- 2022: Stephen Hugh Rogers
- 2023: Alan Brayley
- 2024: Melanie Jane James, of Swansea
- 2025: Diana Sara Stroia, of Swansea
- 2026: Emrys Shaun Elias, of Neath
