= High Sheriff of South Yorkshire =

Ceremonial officer of the English county of South Yorkshire

The High Sheriff of South Yorkshire is a current High Sheriff title which has existed since 1974. The holder is changed annually every March.

For around 1,000 years the entire area of Yorkshire was covered by a single High Sheriff of Yorkshire. After the Local Government Act 1972 the title was split to cover several newly created counties, including South Yorkshire. Within the area Hallamshire had been unique in that it had a High Sheriff of Hallamshire from 1962 until 1974.

Below is a list of the sheriffs.

== List of High Sheriffs ==
- 1974–1975 John Basil Peile
- 1975–1976 Edward John Thornely Taylor
- 1976–1977 John Mark Mansell Jenkinson
- 1977–1978 Eric Wilkes
- 1978–1979 Nigel Haywood Wilton Lee
- 1979–1980 Peter Edward Reynard
- 1980–1981 Charles Gerard Buck
- 1981–1982 Joye Powlett Smith
- 1982–1983 Sir Basil Edward Rhodes
- 1983–1984 Edward Neil Turner
- 1984–1985 Richard Neale Horne
- 1985–1986 Jeremy Ronald Archdale
- 1986–1987 Mark Robin Balfour
- 1987–1988 James Edward Eardley
- 1988–1989 William Hugh Wentworth Ping
- 1989–1990 John Anthony Boddy
- 1990–1991 Stewart McKee Hamilton
- 1991–1992 Ian Stephen Porter
- 1992–1993 David Beatson Clark
- 1993–1994 Christopher Shelley Barker
- 1994–1995 Michael Gordon Samuel Frampton
- 1995–1996 Peter Wilton Lee
- 1996–1997 William George Antony Warde-Norbury
- 1997–1998 Michael John Mallett
- 1998–1999 Kathryn Elizabeth Riddle
- 1999–2000 David Baxter Shaw
- 2000–2001 Ian Geoffrey Norton
- 2001–2002 Adrian M. C. Staniforth
- 2002–2003 Marian Rae
- 2003–2004 David Barker Moody of Ivas Wood, Stainborough, Barnsley
- 2004–2005 Pamela Liversidge
- 2005–2006 Sarah Elizabeth Lee
- 2006–2007 Charles Arnold John Biggin of Ranmore, Sheffield
- 2007–2008 Colonel Jonathan Charles Vivian Hunt of Firbeck, Worksop
- 2008–2009 Dr Robert John Giles Bloomer, of Woodsetts
- 2009–2010 Helena Muller of Slade Hooton, near Laughton-en-le-Morthen
- 2010–2011 Anthony Paul Cooper of Sheffield
- 2011–2012 Andrew Jackson Coombe of Sheffield
- 2012–2013 Julie Ann Kenny of Sheffield
- 2013–2014 Lady Sykes of Hope Valley
- 2014–2015 John Clive Bramah of Lindrick Dale, Worksop, Nottinghamshire
- 2015–2016 John Raymond Holt of Bessacarr, Doncaster
- 2016–2017 Dr Julie MacDonald of Sheffield
- 2017–2018 Stephen Ingram of Sheffield
- 2018–2019 Barry Reginald Eldred of Dodworth, Barnsley
- 2019–2020 John Pickering of Baslow
- 2020–2021 Carole Diane O'Neill of Bawtry
- 2021–2022 Martin James Claude McKervey of Sheffield
- 2022–2023 Lieutenant Colonel Robert Alfred McPherson of Rotherham
- 2023–2024 Professor Jaydip Ray of Sheffield
- 2024–2025 John Baddeley of Sheffield
- 2025–2026: Giuseppe Di′Iasio, of Doncaster
- 2026–2027: Sughra Begum
