= High Sheriff of East Sussex =

Ceremonial officer of East Sussex, England

The High Sheriff of East Sussex is a current title which has existed since 1974; the holder is changed annually every March. For around 1,000 years the county of Sussex was covered by a single High Sheriff of Sussex but after the Local Government Act 1972 the title was split to cover the newly created counties of East Sussex and West Sussex.

The position was once a powerful position responsible for collecting taxes and enforcing law and order in the county. In modern times the high sheriff has become a ceremonial role, presiding over public ceremonies.

== History ==
The office of High Sheriff is over 1000 years old, with its establishment before the Norman Conquest. The Office of High Sheriff remained first in precedence in the counties until the reign of Edward VII when an Order in Council in 1908 gave the Lord-Lieutenant the prime office under the Crown as the Sovereign's personal representative. The High Sheriff remains the Sovereign's representative in the County for all matters relating to the Judiciary and the maintenance of law and order.

== Roles and responsibilities ==
- High Sheriffs are responsible in the Counties of England and Wales for duties conferred by the Crown through Warrant from the Privy Council, including:
- Attendance at Royal visits to the County
- The wellbeing and protection of Her Majesty's High Court Judges when on Circuit in the County and attending them in Court during the legal terms
- The execution of High Court Writs and Orders (which is mainly achieved through the Under Sheriff)
- Acting as the Returning Officer for Parliamentary Elections in County constituencies
- Responsibility for the proclamation of the accession of a new Sovereign
- The maintenance of the loyalty of subjects to the Crown

== High Sheriffs of East Sussex ==
- 1974–1975: Joseph Mcarthur Rank, of Hartfield
- 1975–1976: Thomas Edward Sydney Egerton, of Robertsbridge
- 1976–1977: Laurence Carey Hardy, of Dane Hill, Haywards Heath
- 1977–1978: Arthur Collwyn Sturge, of Faircrouch, Wadhurst
- 1978–1979: Reginald George Edwardes-Jones, of Scrag Oak Manor, Wadhurst
- 1979–1980: Christopher Charles Cyprian Bridge, of The Old Vicarage, Firle
- 1980–1981: Thomas Halliday Baskerville Mynors, of Moseham House
- 1981–1982: Major Michael Herbert Reid, of Cooper's Farm, Stonegate, Wadhurst
- 1982–1983: Oliver Piers St. Aubin, of Woodside House, Barcombe, Lewes
- 1983–1984: Lieutenant-Colonel Rodney Onslow Dennys
- 1984–1985: Capt Samuel Le Hunte Lombard-Hobson, of Colbran's Farm, Laughton
- 1985–1986: Michael Robert Toynbee, of Westerleigh, Wadhurst
- 1986–1987: Rupert Cyster, of Rye
- 1987–1988: Timothy Jones, of Berwick
- 1988–1989: Edward Hardcastle, of Wadhurst
- 1989–1990: David Baker, of Laughton
- 1990–1991: Peter Dunn, of Rushlake Green
- 1991–1992: Roderick Petley, of Heathfield
- 1992–1993: Ian Cox, of Brightling
- 1993–1994: Andrew Stewart-Roberts of Offham
- 1994–1995: Lady (Jane) Lloyd of Berwick
- 1995–1996: Alan Mayes-Smith
- 1996–1997: John Fooks
- 1997–1998: John Whitmore
- 1998–1999: Gillian Evelyn Schluter, Viscountess Brentford
- 1999–2000: Keith Miller
- 2000–2001: William Fane de Salis
- 2001–2002: Anthony Richard Paul Carden
- 2002–2003: David Roderick Michael Pennock
- 2003–2004: Alastair Ainslie
- 2004–2005: Julian Avery
- 2005–2006: David Tate
- 2006–2007: Amanda Caroline Hamblin
- 2007–2008: Caroline Anne Mayhew
- 2008–2009: Hugh Thomas Burnett of Hove
- 2009–2010: William Thomas Cornelius Shelford of Lewes
- 2010–2011: Deborah Clare Melanie Bedford of Ringmer, Lewes
- 2011–2012: Kathleen Ann Gore of Framfield, Uckfield
- 2012-2013: David Peter Allam of Bishopstone Village, Seaford
- 2013-2014: Graham Peters of Bodiam
- 2014–2015: Christopher John Gebbie of Ringmer
- 2015-2016: Juliet Anne Smith of Brighton Marina, Brighton
- 2016–2017: Michael Jabez Foster of Hastings
- 2017-2018: Maureen Jane Chowen of Brighton
- 2018–2019: Major General John David Moore-Bick of Robertsbridge
- 2019–2020: Violet Ljubica Hancock of Ringmer
- 2020–2021: Andrew John Blackman of Fairlight
- 2021–2022: Miles Anthony Jenner of Lewes
- 2022–2023: Madeleine Jane King of Uckfield
- 2023-2024: Edward Richard Bickersteth of Ashburnham, Battle
- 2024–2025: Lucinda Anne Fraser of Robertsbridge
- 2025–2026: Anne Doria Brown of Polegate
- 2026–2027: Michael James Bedingfield of Brighton
