= High Sheriff of South Glamorgan =

Welsh county ceremonial officer

The office of High Sheriff of South Glamorgan was established in 1974 as part of the creation of the county of South Glamorgan in Wales following the Local Government Act 1972. Together with the High Sheriff of West Glamorgan and the High Sheriff of Mid Glamorgan, the office effectively replaced that of the High Sheriff of Glamorgan.

== High Sheriffs of South Glamorgan ==
- Before 1974 – See High Sheriff of Glamorgan
- 1974: Colonel Kenneth Morgan of Llantrithyd
- 1975: Anthony Selwyn Martyn of St. Nicholas
- 1976: Joseph Gerald Gaskell of Dinas Powys
- 1977: Francis Edward Sutherland Hayes of Llansannor
- 1978: Christopher Michael Brain Of Peterson-Super-Ely
- 1979: John Leonard, Baron Leonard of Cardiff (excused); Harold Emmett Williams of Penarth
- 1980: Thomas Henry Keen, of Bonvilston (excused); Henry Gethin Lewis of Sutton Mawr
- 1981: Colonel Sir Christopher Matthew Peterson of Cardiff
- 1982: Ivan Dale Owen of Penarth
- 1983: Ian Eric Colston of Boverton, Llantwit Major
- 1984: Cecil Herbert Rapport of Cardiff
- 1985: William Emrys Evans of Dinas Powis
- 1986: Sir Brooke Charles Boothby, 15th Baronet, of Ffonmon
- 1987: Sir Donald Walters of Cardiff
- 1988: Dudley Henry Fisher of Cardiff
- 1989: Christopher Pollard of Penarth
- 1990: Brian Keith Thomas of Cardiff
- 1991: Michael John Clay D.L. of Cowbridge
- 1992: Alastair Owen Golley, of Dinas
- 1993: Commander John Mascall Darby Curteis of St. Hilary
- 1994: Joanna Cory of Penllyn
- 1995: John Wynford Evans of St.
- 1996: Ralph Philip Vincent Rees of Radyr
- 1997: John Phillips of Ystradowen
- 1998: David Mansel Jones, of Cowbridge
- 1999: Meriel Watkins of Penarth
- 2000: Michael Charles Eddershaw of Llansannor
- 2001: Lieutenant Colonel Rhodri Llewellyn Traherne of Coedarhydyglyn
- 2002: Colin John Richards of St. Nicholas
- 2003: Josephine Homfray of Cowbridge
- 2004: Fiona Natalie Peel of Cardiff
- 2005: Derek Ivor Rapport of Cardiff
- 2006: Lady Monjulee Webb
- 2007: Paul Williams
- 2008: Brian Idris Rees of Llandaff
- 2009: Professor Anthony James Hazell of Penarth
- 2010: Margaret Anne Campbell
- 2011: Roger Geraint Thomas
- 2012: Arun Midha
- 2013: Morfudd Ann Meredith
- 2014: David Ward Jenkins
- 2015: Professor Heather Vivienne Stevens of The Waterloo Foundation, Cardiff
- 2016: Professor John David Williams of Cardiff
- 2017: Gilbert Campbell Lloyd of Llandaff, Cardiff
- 2018: Brian Charles Lakin of Walterston, near Barry
- 2019: Dr Isabel Mary Graham, Peterston-super-Ely, Cardiff
- 2020: Andrew Rhys Howell of St Mellons, Cardiff
- 2021: Peter Richard Dewey of St Nicholas, Vale of Glamorgan
- 2022: Rosaleen Moriarty-Simmonds of Cardiff
- 2023: David Rhys Hughes James of Radyr, Cardiff
- 2024: Janey Elizabeth Howell of Cardiff
- 2025: Janet Davies, of Cowbridge
- 2026: Jane Elizabeth John, of Barry
