= High Sheriff of Powys =

Welsh county ceremonial officer

The office of High Sheriff of Powys was established in 1974 as part of the creation of the county of Powys in Wales, replacing the shrievalties of the amalgamated counties: High Sheriff of Montgomeryshire, High Sheriff of Radnorshire and High Sheriff of Brecknockshire.

This is a list of High Sheriffs of Powys.

- 1974–1975: Francis Amcotts Wilson of Garth House, Garth, Llangammarch Wells.
- 1975–1976: Major Edward Arthur Trevor Bonnor-Maurice, of Bodynfoel Hall, Llanfechain.
- 1976–1977: Hugo John Laurence Philipps of Llanstephan House, Llyswen.
- 1977–1978: Viscountess De L'Isle (née Margaret Eldrydd Shoubridge) of Glanusk Park, Crickhowell
- 1978–1979: Diana Yarnton Barstow (née Mills), of Fforest Farm, Hundred House, Llandrindod Wells
- 1979–1980: William David Eynon Lowe, of Glasfryn, Alexandra Road, Brecon.
- 1980–1981: Tudor Morgan Howell, of Ynyswen, Trefeglwys, Caersws
- 1981–1982: Robin Gibson-Watt Geligarn Llanyre, Llandrindod Wells
- 1982–1983: Peter Frederick Lowe, of The Grange, St. Hilary, Cowbridge, South Glamorgan.
- 1983–1984: Herbert Noel Jerman, of Dolforgan Gardens, Kerry, Newtown, Powys.
- 1984–1985: David Spencer Baird-Murray of Nant-y-Groes, Llanyre, LLandrindod Wells
- 1985–1986: Charles Richard Woosnam, of Cefnllysgwynne, Builth Wells
- 1986–1987: Ribah Dugdale, (née Corbett-Winder) of Lower Cefn Perfa, Kerry, Newtown.
- 1987–1988: Rosalind Mary Thomas, of Cefndyrys, Llanelwedd, Builth Wells.
- 1988–1989: Major Christopher Rupert Cyril Inglis, of Llansantffraed House, Talybont-on-Usk, Bwlch.
- 1989–1990: Thomas George Steadman, of The Maesydd, Pool Quay, Welshpool.
- 1990–1991: Norman Oliver Tyler, of Coedspoil, Llanfaredd, Builth Wells.
- 1991–1992: Shân Legge-Bourke (née Bailey) of Penmyarth, Glanusk Park, Crickhowell
- 1992–1993: lan Gray, of Bodfach Hall, Llanyllin
- 1993–1994: Captain Andrew James Gibson-Watt
- 1994–1995: Susan Angela Garnons Ballance, (née Williams) of Abercamlais House, Brecon.
- 1995–1996: Peter English of Derwen Mead, Abermule, Montgomery
- 1996–1997: William Ashe Dymoke Windham, of Parc Gwynne, Glasbury on Wye, via Hereford
- 1997–1998: Rosalind Helen Penrose Price, Moor Park, Llanbedr, Crickhowell.
- 1998–1999: John Trevor Kynaston Trevor, of Trawscoed Hall, Welshpool.
- 1999–2000: Jonathan Guy Coltman-Rogers, of Stanage Park, Knighton
- 2000–2001: William Nigel Henry Legge-Bourke, Penmyarth, Glanusk Park, Crickhowell.
- 2001–2002: David Patrick Trant, Maesmawr Hall, Welshpool.
- 2002–2003: Sophie Clodagh Mary Blain, Monaughty, Knighton.
- 2003–2004: Penelope Anne Bourdillon, Llwynmadoc, Llanwrtyd Wells
- 2004–2005: Lady Davies, (née Beryl Oliver) of Plas Dinam, Llandinam, wife of The 3rd Baron Davies
- 2005–2006: Frank Julian Even Salmon
- 2006–2007: David Jones Powell
- 2007–2008: John James Turner of Castle Caereinion, Welshpool
- 2008–2009: Thomas Samuel Davis of Llaithddu, Llandrindod Wells
- 2009–2010: David Thomas Marner Lloyd of Sennybridge, Brecon
- 2010–2011: Jennifer Anne Thomas of Berriew, Welshpool
- 2011–2012: Colonel John Harold Brunt, of Knighton
- 2012–2013: Susan, Lady Large (née Melville) of Talybont-on-Usk, Brecon (wife of Sir Andrew Large)
- 2013–2014: Bernard Bromley Harris, of Meifod
- 2014–2015: Philip Bowen of Penlanole
- 2015–2016: Lieutenant Colonel Michael Hugh Ledston Lewis, of Glanusk, Llanfrynach, Brecon
- 2016–2017: Ann Tudor, of Llanerfyl, Welshpool
- 2017–2018: Susan Elizabeth Thompson, of Kinnerton, Presteigne
- 2018–2019: David Rowland Price, of Builth Wells
- 2019–2020: David Lloyd Peate, of Llanfair Caereinion, Welshpool
- 2020-2021: Rhian Meredydd Duggan, of Llandrindod Wells
- 2021-2022: Peter Ronald James
- 2022-2023: Thomas Henry Jones
- 2023-2024: Reginald Cawthorne
- 2024-2025: Lady Kathryn Susan Silk, (née Barnes) of Crickhowell
- 2025-2026: Sally Roberts, of Oswestry
- 2026-2027: William Walter Watkins, of Knighton
