= High Sheriff of Tyne and Wear =

Ceremonial officer of Tyne and Wear, England

Below is a complete list of High Sheriffs of Tyne and Wear since the creation of that county in 1974.

== 1974–2000 ==
- 1974–1975: Fuller Mansfield Osborn, of 9 Furzefield Road, Gosforth, Newcastle upon Tyne
- 1975–1976: John Macaulay Hamilton Ross, of 1 Beresford Park, Sunderland
- 1976–1977: Robert Arthur Stuart Sisterson, of 22 Westfield Drive, Gosforth, Newcastle upon Tyne
- 1977–1978: Thomas Anthony Greenwell, of Witton House, West Park Road, Cleadon, Sunderland
- 1978–1979: Colonel George Brown, of 9 West Dene Drive, North Shields
- 1979–1980: Robert Harvey Dunford, of Flat 7, Howard House, North Avenue, Newcastle upon Tyne
- 1980–1981: Captain John Darley Farrow, of Fatfield House, Fatfield, Washington
- 1981–1982: Nicholas Johnson Robinson, of 42 The Grove, Gosforth, Newcastle upon Tyne
- 1982–1983: Robert Hackworth Chapman, of 25 Moor Crescent, Gosforth, Newcastle upon Tyne
- 1983–1984: Mary Dobson, of Wildwoods, Orchard Road, Rowlands Gill
- 1984–1985: David Cowley Souter, of 4 Chatsworth, Moor Crescent, Gosforth, Newcastle upon Tyne
- 1985–1986: Austen Ian Welch, of 1 Millview Drive, Tynemouth, North Shields
- 1986–1987: Frederick Wilson Hoult, of Stavros, 43 The Grove, Gosforth, Newcastle upon Tyne
- 1987–1988: Michael Francis Pyman, of Dursley, Fencer Hill Park, Gosforth, Newcastle upon Tyne
- 1988–1989: Roy Irvine Stewart, of Brockenhurst, 2 The Broadway, Tynemouth
- 1989–1990: Douglas Smith, of Flat 3, Dene Grange, Lindisfarne Road, Jesmond, Newcastle upon Tyne
- 1990–1991: Nigel Sherlock, of 14 North Avenue, Gosforth, Newcastle upon Tyne
- 1991–1992: Malcolm James Scott, of Appleby House, Saltwell Road South, Gateshead
- 1992–1993: Hugh Goundry Brown, of Heatherlea, 12 Lindisfarne Road, Jesmond, Newcastle upon Tyne
- 1993–1994: Sir David Robert Macgowan Chapman, 3rd Baronet
- 1994–1995: Roger Charlton Spoor, of 5 Graham Park Road, Gosforth, Newcastle upon Tyne
- 1995–1996: Alan William Lillington, of 30 Barnes View, Sunderland
- 1996–1997: Michael Litster Fisher, of 13 The Grove, Gosforth, Newcastle upon Tyne
- 1997–1998: Sylvia Margaret Murray, 35 North Ridge, Whitley Bay
- 1998–1999: John Streeton Ward, Eastfields, 5 Eastfields, Whitburn, Sunderland
- 1999–2000: Michael Bird, Stone Cutters, Church Road, Northumberland

== 2000 to present ==
- 2000–2001: John Teasdale Ward, 92 Kenton Road, Gosforth, Newcastle upon Tyne
- 2001–2002: Ann Darling, Hartside, 6 Whitburn Road, Cleadon, near Sunderland
- 2002–2003: Gitika Banerjee, 9 Bainbridge Holme Close, Sunderland
- 2003–2004: James Robertson Graeme Wright, 10 Montagu Avenue, Gosforth, Newcastle upon Tyne
- 2004–2005: Sir Neville Guthrie Trotter, One Kingsland, Jesmond, Newcastle upon Tyne
- 2005–2006: Margaret Appleby
- 2006–2007: Marjorie Barton
- 2007–2008: Nigel Alistair Westwood
- 2008–2009: John Squires of Riding Mill
- 2009–2010: Gavin MacFarlane Black of Stamfordham
- 2010–2011: Susan Margaret Winfield of Middle Herrington
- 2011–2012: Geoffry Mark Hodgson of Newcastle upon Tyne
- 2012–2013: Ashley John Graham Winter of Hexham
- 2013–2014: George Scott of Newcastle Upon Tyne
- 2014–2015: Ruth Thompson of Cleadon Village, Sunderland
- 2015–2016: Lucy Winskell
- 2016–2017: John Dennis Mowbray of Fulwell, Sunderland
- 2017–2018: Lieutenant General Robin Vaughan Brims of Dalton, Newcastle upon Tyne.
- 2018–2019: Paul Michael Callaghan of Sunderland
- 2019–2020: Catherine Lorna Moran of Jesmond, Newcastle upon Tyne
- 2020–2021: Sarah Lesley Stewart of Gosforth, Newcastle upon Tyne
- 2021–2022: Farooq Hakim
- 2022–2023: David Wilson Bavaird
- 2023–2024: Dame Irene Lucas-Hays
- 2024-2025: Dr Lindsey Janet Whiterod, of Whickham
- 2025-2026: Joanne Jane Curry, of Tynemouth
- 2026–2027: Ammar Yusuf Mirza, of Ponteland
