= High Sheriff of Mid Glamorgan =

Welsh county ceremonial officer

The office of High Sheriff of Mid Glamorgan was established in 1974 as part of the creation of the county of Mid Glamorgan in Wales following the Local Government Act 1972, and, together with the High Sheriff of West Glamorgan and the High Sheriff of South Glamorgan, effectively replaced the office of the High Sheriff of Glamorgan.

== High Sheriffs of Mid Glamorgan ==
- Before 1974 – See High Sheriff of Glamorgan
- 1974: John Lewis Maybery Bevan of Croffta, Groes-Faen, Pontyclun, Llantrisant
- 1975: (Herbert) Leslie Joseph of Coedargraig, Newton, Porthcawl
- 1976: Douglas George Badham of Plas Watford, Caerphilly
- 1977: Douglas Andrew Scott of Porthcawl
- 1978: Murray Adams McLaggan of Merthyr Mawr House, Bridgend
- 1979: Major George Morgan Thomas Lindsay of Glanmor, Southerndown, Bridgend
- 1980: Robert Watkin Stacey Knight of Tynycaeau, St. Brides Major, near Bridgend
- 1981: Edward Arthur Lewis of Grove House, 38 Lan Park Road, Pontypridd
- 1982: William Kingdon Eynon of Tusker House, Newton, Porthcawl
- 1983: Alan Edward Mayer of Ty Mawr, Efail Isaf, Pontypridd
- 1984: Edward Rea of Llechwedd, Y Pare, Groesfaen, Pontyclun
- 1985: Owain Anthony Mervyn Williams of Llanharan House, Llanharan
- 1986: Kathrin (Kate) Thomas of Gelli Hir, Nelson, Treharris
- 1987: Peter Dobson Allen of Furzebrook, 82 Merthyr Mawr Road, Bridgend
- 1988: Derek William Charles Morgan of Erw Graig, Merthyr Mawr, Bridgend
- 1989: Harold John Tamplin of Cwmnofydd Farm, Machen, Newport
- 1990: Islwyn Thomas Rees of Tan-y-lan Farm, St. Mary Hill, Pencoed
- 1991: David Edward Cox of Trem-y-mor, 221 West Road, Nottage, Porthcawl
- 1992: Kenneth Merlin David Johns of Pencoed House, Capel Llanilltern
- 1993: Barbara Magdalene Ladbrooke of Long Acre Farm, Coity
- 1994: Colonel Thomas Udy Buckthought of The Bucks, 13 Underwood, Caerphilly
- 1995: Byron Frederick Butler of Aberkenfig
- 1996: Dan Clayton Jones of Mwyndy House, Mwyndy, near Llantrisant
- 1997: Raymond William Martin of Ffynon Pantrhosla, Llangewydd, near Bridgend
- 1998: Anthony Robert Lewis
- 1999: David Hugh Thomas, Llys Gwyn, Bridgend
- 2000: William Hopkin Joseph, Fairfield Court, Laleston, Bridgend
- 2001: Michael Eammon McGrane, Nant, Coslech, Peterston Road, Groes Faen
- 2002: Gerald Haydn Coleman, Stray Leaves, Heol Spencer, Coity, Bridgend.
- 2003: John Henry Kendall Dan y Bryn, Vaynor, Merthyr Tydfil
- 2004: Bethan Mary Williams, Llanharan House, Llanharan.
- 2005: Clive Thomas
- 2006: Alan Sheppard
- 2007: Charles Knight
- 2008: Anne Yvette Morgan of Bridgend
- 2009: John Anthony Tal-Williams of Mountain Ash
- 2010: Beverley A Humphreys of Pontypridd
- 2011: Dr Barbara Wilding
- 2012: Ann Jenkins
- 2013: Rory James Murray McLaggan
- 2014: Elizabeth Singer of Newton, Porthcawl
- 2015: Jayne Ann James of Longlands Farm, Pyle, Bridgend
- 2016: Gwynfryn John George of Caerphilly, Mid Glamorgan
- 2017: David John Davies of Porthcawl
- 2018: Jonathan Hugh Wall of Porthcawl
- 2019: Colonel Wilma Christina Jean Donnelly (Rtd), of Church Village
- 2020: Jason Michael Edwards of Pontypridd
- 2021: Jeffrey Edwards of Aberfan, Merthyr Tydfil.
- 2022: Maria Kovacevic Thomas
- 2023: Professor Jean White
- 2024: Dr Richard John Penry Lewis, of Maesteg
- 2025: Sharon Iquo Dixon, of Pontyclun
- 2026: John Edward Charles, of Rhondda Cyon Taf
