= Ninian (disambiguation) =

Ninian may refer to:

== People ==
- Ninian, medieval Christian bishop who evangelized the Picts
- Ninian Cockburn (died 1579), Scottish soldier
- Ninian Edwards (1775–1833), American politician
- Ninian Wirt Edwards (1809–1889), American politician
- Ninian Stephen (1923–2017), Australian Governor-General
- Ninian Crichton Stuart (born 1957), Scottish hereditary palace keeper
- Lord Ninian Crichton-Stuart (1883–1915), Welsh politician

== Places ==
- Ninian (river), France
- Ninian Central Platform, oil platform in the North Sea
- Ninian Park, football stadium in Cardiff
- St Ninian's Isle, Shetland

== Other ==
- Ninian, a character in Nintendo's Fire Emblem: The Blazing Blade
