= Nicholas Hawkins =

Nicholas or Nick Hawkins may refer to:

- Nick Hawkins (politician) (born 1957), MP for Blackpool South and Surrey Heath
- Nicholas Hawkins (MP) (fl. 1597), MP for Cardiff Boroughs
- Nicholas Hawkins (priest) (died 1534), English cleric and diplomat
- Nick Hawkins (musician) (1965–2005), guitarist
