= John Stuart, Lord Mount Stuart =

British politician and militia officer (1767–1794)

Lord Mount Stuart
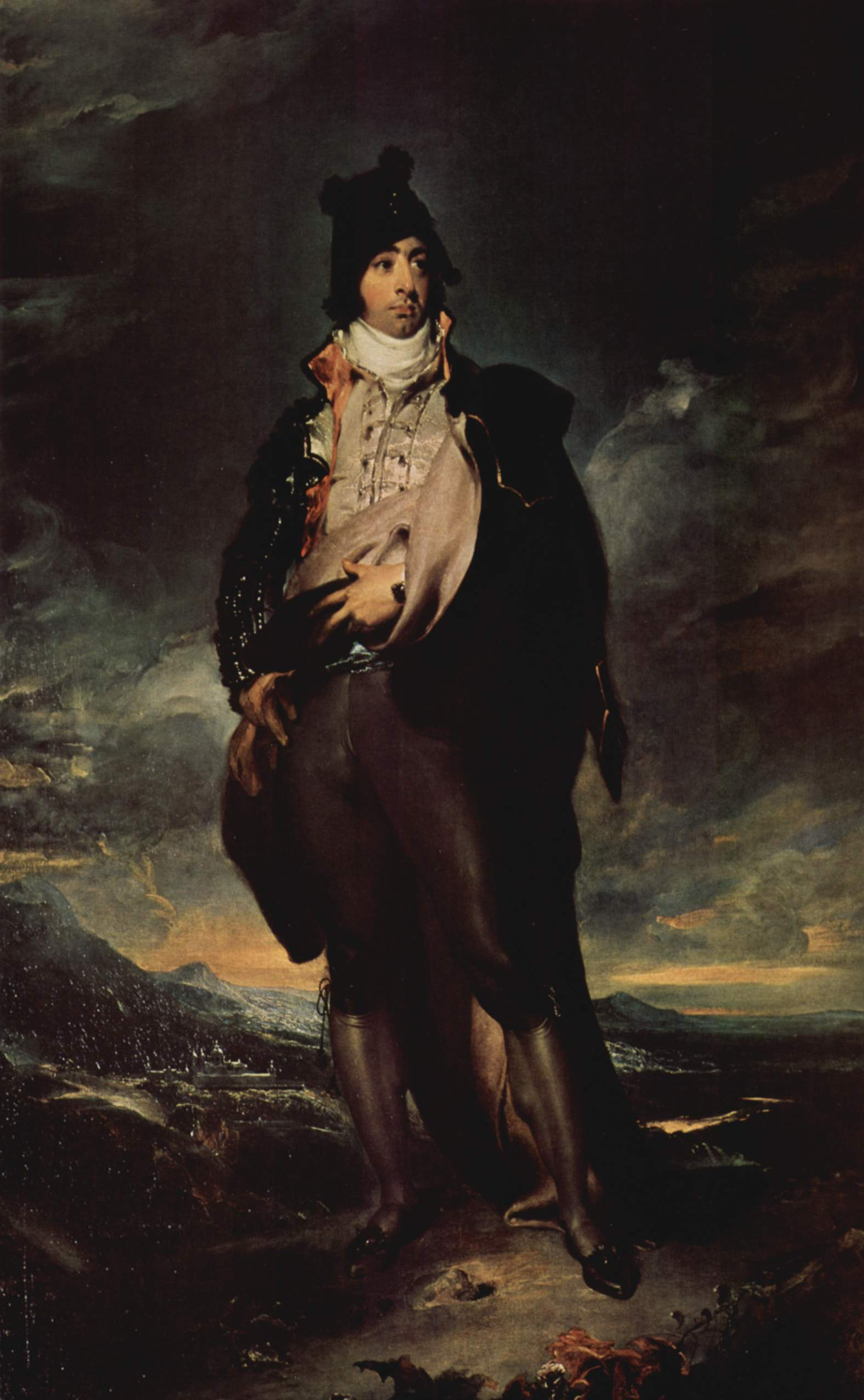
- Posthumous portrait by Sir Thomas Lawrence, c. 1795

Member of Parliament for Cardiff
- In office 1790–1794
- Preceded by: Herbert Mackworth
- Succeeded by: Lord Evelyn Stuart

Personal details
- Born: 25 September 1767 Grosvenor Square, London
- Died: 22 January 1794 (aged 26) Bassingbourn Hall, Stansted, Essex
- Spouse: Elizabeth Penelope McDouall-Crichton
- Children: John Crichton-Stuart, 2nd Marquess of Bute; Lord Patrick Crichton-Stuart
- Parents: John Stuart, 1st Marquess of Bute (father); the Hon. Charlotte Windsor (mother)

Colonel John Stuart, Lord Mount Stuart (25 September 1767 – 22 January 1794) was a British Tory politician and militia officer who represented Cardiff in the House of Commons of Great Britain from 1790 to 1794.

Mount Stuart was the son of the John Stuart, 1st Marquess of Bute, and the grandson of Prime Minister John Stuart, 3rd Earl of Bute. His mother was the Hon. Charlotte Jane, daughter and heiress of Herbert Windsor, 2nd Viscount Windsor. He was born at Grosvenor Square, London, in 1767 and educated at Eton and St John's College, Cambridge.

In 1790, he was elected Member of Parliament for Cardiff, a seat he held until his death. He took over from his father as colonel of the Glamorgan Militia in 1791 and was also Lord-Lieutenant of Glamorganshire between 1793 and his death.

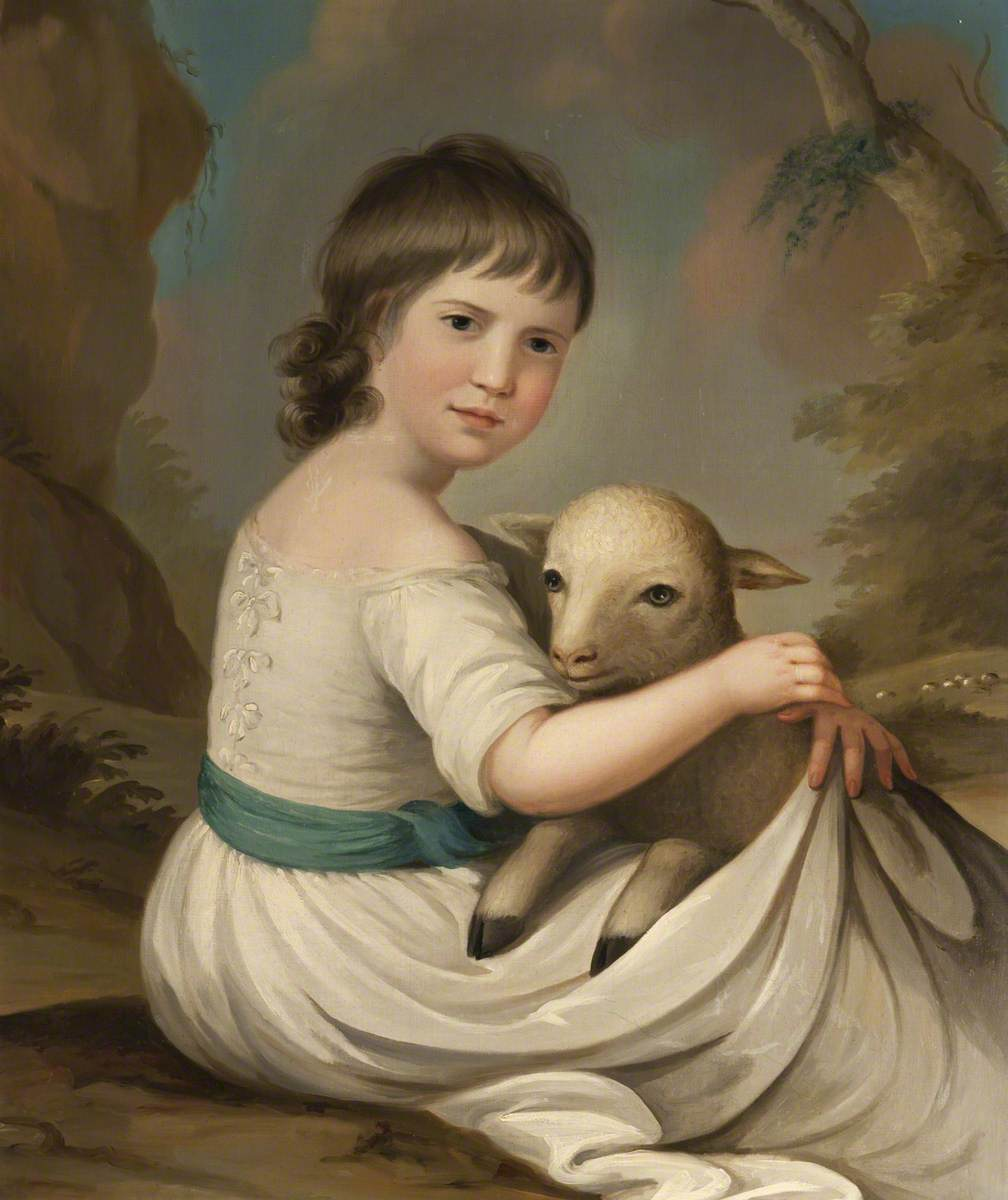
His wife when she still a child, Lady Elizabeth Penelope Crichton

Lord Mount Stuart married Lady Elizabeth McDouall-Crichton, daughter of Patrick McDouall-Crichton, 6th Earl of Dumfries, and his wife Margaret (née Crauford), on 12 October 1792. They had two sons, who both added the surname "Crichton" before that of "Stuart" in 1805:

- John Crichton-Stuart, 2nd Marquess of Bute (10 August 1793 – 18 March 1848)
- Lord Patrick James Herbert Crichton-Stuart (25 August 1794 – 7 September 1859). In 1817 he obtained the rank of the son of a Marquess, which his father would have been, had he not died before his father, the 1st Marquess.

On 22 January, 1794, Lord Mount Stuart died in Bassingbourn Hall near Stansted, Essex at the age of 26, a month after his injury caused by falling off his horse. He was survived by Lady Mount Stuart, who died 3 years after in July 1797.

Parliament of Great Britain
Preceded by Sir Herbert Mackworth	Member of Parliament for Cardiff; 1790–1794	Succeeded by Lord Evelyn Stuart
Honorary titles
Preceded by The Earl of Bute	Lord-Lieutenant of Glamorganshire; 1793–1794	Vacant Title next held by The Earl of Bute
