= Royal Glamorgan Light Infantry =

Auxiliary unit of the British Army

Glamorganshire Militia Royal Glamorgan Light Infantry 3rd (Reserve) Battalion, Welsh Regiment
- Active: 1662–1 April 1908
- Country: England 1662–1707; Kingdom of Great Britain (1707–1800); United Kingdom (1801–1908)
- Branch: Militia/Special Reserve
- Role: Infantry
- Size: 1 Battalion
- Part of: Welch Regiment
- Garrison/HQ: Maindy Barracks, Cardiff
- Motto: Gwell angau na Chywilydd (Better Death than Dishonour) (Note: Adopted on joining the Welsh Regiment in 1881.)
- Mascot: A white goat
- Anniversaries: 1 March (St David's Day)
- Engagements: Merthyr Rising; Second Boer War

The Glamorganshire Militia, later the Royal Glamorgan Light Infantry, was an auxiliary (Note: It is incorrect to describe the British Militia as 'irregular': throughout their history they were equipped and trained exactly like the line regiments of the regular army, and once embodied in time of war they were fulltime professional soldiers for the duration of their enlistment.) regiment reorganised in the county of Glamorganshire in South Wales during the 18th Century from earlier precursor units. Primarily intended for home defence, it served in Britain and Ireland through all Britain's major wars and supported the civil powers in peacetime. It became a battalion of the Welsh Regiment in 1881, (Note: The spelling was officially changed to 'Welch Regiment' on 1 January 1921, but the regiment had already used it unofficially for many years.) and saw active service in the Second Boer War. Transferring to the Special Reserve in 1908 it trained thousands of reinforcements for that regiment during World War I. After a shadowy postwar existence, the militia was disbanded in 1953.

== Glamorgan Trained Bands ==
The universal obligation to military service in the Shire levy was long established in England and was extended to Wales. King Henry VIII called a 'Great Muster' in 1539, which showed 1000 men available for service in Glamorgan, of whom only 29 had 'harness', and there were only seven horsemen,

The legal basis of the militia was updated by two acts of 1557 covering musters (4 & 5 Ph. & M. c. 3) and the maintenance of horses and armour (4 & 5 Ph. & M. c. 2). The county militia was now under the Lord Lieutenant, assisted by the Deputy Lieutenants and Justices of the Peace (JPs). The entry into force of these Acts in 1558 is seen as the starting date for the organised Militia of England and Wales. Although the militia obligation was universal, it was clearly impractical to train and equip every able-bodied man, so after 1572 the practice was to select a proportion of men for the Trained Bands, who were mustered for regular training.

In the 16th Century little distinction was made between the militia and the troops levied by the counties for overseas expeditions. However, the counties usually conscripted the unemployed and criminals rather than send the trained bandsmen. Between 1585 and 1602 Glamorgan supplied 970 men for service in Ireland and 30 for the Netherlands. The men were given three days' 'conduct money' to get to Chester, the main port of embarkation for Ireland. Conduct money was recovered from the government, but replacing the weapons issued to the levies from the militia armouries was a heavy cost on the counties.

With the passing of the threat of invasion, the trained bands declined in the early 17th Century. Later, King Charles I attempted to reform them into a national force or 'Perfect Militia' answering to the king rather than local control. The Glamorgan Trained Bands of 1638 consisted of 400 men armed with 200 muskets and 200 Corslets (body armour, signifying pikemen). They also mustered 36 horse. Glamorganshire was ordered to send 200 men overland to Newcastle upon Tyne for the Second Bishops' War of 1640. However, substitution was rife and many of those sent on this unpopular service would have been untrained replacements.

=== Civil Wars ===
Control of the militia was one of the areas of dispute between Charles I and Parliament that led to the English Civil War. When open war broke out between the King and Parliament, neither side made much use of the trained bands beyond securing the county armouries for their own full-time troops. Most of Wales was under Royalist control for much of the war, and was a recruiting ground for the King's armies. In 1642 Sir Anthony Mansel was the Royalist governor of Cardiff with a garrison drawn from the Glamorgan TBs. From August 1643 Mansel and Sir Richard Bassett, each with a regiment of Glamorgan TBs, were engaged in the fruitless Siege of Gloucester, which was relieved by the Earl of Essex on 5 September. The two regiments may then have marched with the Royal Army in pursuit of Essex and been engaged at the First Battle of Newbury, where Mansel was killed. A third regiment recruited from Glamorgan participated in the same campaign: commanded by Richard Donnell, it may have recruited volunteers from the Glamorgan TBs. Bassett's regiment may have been at Cardiff when it was lost to Parliament in 1645. Donnell was governor of Swansea when that was also captured that year. Mansell's regiment may have been taken over by his stepson Bussey Mansell, who in 1645 briefly joined the anti-war Glamorgan 'Clubmen' or 'Neutrals' before defecting to Parliament and being appointed commander of the Parliamentary forces in Glamorgan.

Once Parliament had established full control in 1648 it passed new Militia Acts that replaced lords lieutenant with county commissioners appointed by Parliament or the Council of State. At the same time the term 'Trained Band' began to disappear in most counties. Under the Commonwealth and Protectorate the militia received pay when called out, and operated alongside the New Model Army to control the country.

By 1651 the militias of the South Welsh counties appear to have been combined, with the 'South Wales Militia' being ordered to rendezvous at Gloucester to hold the city during the Worcester campaign. Bussey Mansell was nominated as a colonel of militia in 1655, and to command the whole militia of South Wales in 1659 during Sir George Booth's Cheshire Rising.

== Glamorgan Militia ==
After the Restoration of the Monarchy, the Militia was re-established by the Militia Act 1661 under the control of the king's lords lieutenant, the men to be selected by ballot. This was popularly seen as the 'Constitutional Force' to counterbalance a 'Standing Army' tainted by association with the New Model Army that had supported Cromwell's military dictatorship. Sir Edward Mansel, 4th Baronet was appointed a commissioner of militia in Glamorgan in 1660, and was a colonel of foot from 1665.

The militia forces in the Welsh counties were small, and were grouped together under the direction of the Lord President of the Council of Wales. As Lord President, the Duke of Beaufort carried out a tour of inspection of the Welsh militia in 1684, when the Glamorganshire contingent consisted of a regiment of foot and one troop of horse under the command of his sons the Marquess of Worcester and Lord Arthur Somerset. In 1697 it consisted of 483 foot in nine companies under the command of Sir Edward Mansel, and a troop of 40 horse under Captain Martin Button

Generally the militia declined in the long peace after the Treaty of Utrecht in 1713. Jacobites were numerous amongst the Welsh Militia, but they did not show their hands during the Risings of 1715 and 1745, and bloodshed was avoided.

== 1757 reforms ==
=== Seven Years' War ===
Under threat of French invasion during the Seven Years' War a series of Militia Acts from 1757 re-established county militia regiments, the men being conscripted by means of parish ballots (paid substitutes were permitted) to serve for three years. There was a property qualification for officers, who were commissioned by the lord lieutenant. An adjutant and drill sergeants were to be provided to each regiment from the Regular Army, and arms and accoutrements would be supplied when the county had secured 60 per cent of its quota of recruits.

Glamorganshire was given a quota of 360 men to raise. The county's arms were issued in January 1760 and the men assembled in two parts at Cardiff and Swansea on or shortly after 19 January. The regiment was organised as seven companies including a Grenadier Company, with Sir Edmond Thomas, 4th Baronet of Wenvoe Castle, appointed as lieutenant-colonel commandant. Its headquarters (HQ) was established at a house on the corner of St Mary Street and Wharton Street in Cardiff, which became known as The Armoury, and housed the permanent staff and weapons.

The regiment was embodied for fulltime service on 4 January 1761, now under the command of Earl Talbot. The regiment was marched from Cardiff to be stationed at Bideford, North Devon, but once it reached Bristol its destination was changed, and it went into barracks at Topsham, near Exeter in South Devon, until May. By June 1762 the regiment was back in Glamorgan, with four companies quartered in Swansea and the remainder in Cardiff. The Swansea companies went by sea to Cardiff, and then the whole was shipped across to Bristol. In September a number of the militiamen got into a fight with local butchers and sailors in St Nicholas Street, in which two sailors were killed and others on both sides wounded. Several were imprisoned and one militiamen was tried for murder. Two other privates of the regiment were convicted of taking bribes to let French prisoners of war out of prison in Knowle, Bristol, and one was sentenced to be shot. However, the war was ending, and in December the regiment was marched back to Cardiff. There it was disembodied, the weapons being returned to store and the men paid off and dismissed to their homes, to be called out for periodic training.

=== American War of Independence ===
The American War of Independence broke out in 1775, and by 1778 Britain was threatened with invasion by the Americans' allies, France and Spain. The militia were called out, and the Glamorgans assembled on 26 March. Shortly afterwards they were marched to Warley Camp in Essex, where a division of Regular and Militia battalions was concentrated and exercised together, the Glamorgans being part of the 'Reserve of the Left'.

Because of the differences in culture and language, the Glamorgan men found service in England very disagreeable, and in the autumn of 1778 the men whose enlistments were due to expire the following summer declared that they were not willing to re-engage. `The Lord Lieutenant of Glamorgan, Lord Mount Stuart, who was also the regimental colonel, suggested that they should be allowed two months at home in exchange for re-enlisting, and 150 did eventually rejoin. From 1780 Lord Mount Stuart's second-in-command was Lt-Col Sir Herbert Mackworth, 1st Baronet, MP for Cardiff.

At the end of the training at Warley the regiment returned to winter quarters at Cardiff. Early in 1780 it joined the Bristol Garrison until May when it was relieved by the Monmouthshire Militia and was ordered north to Lancashire. At the time Lancaster and Preston were disturbed by the 'No Popery' agitation: there was unauthorised military drilling among young men, the American flag was raised, and the king was cursed. A 50-man detachment of the Glamorgans preserved the peace in Lancaster, behaving well under serious provocation. Their commander, Lieutenant Jenkins, showed considerable skill in restoring quiet.

On 17 and 18 September 1781 Major-General Styles inspected the regiment in two 'divisions' at Preston and Wigan. He reported the regiment as looking well and being fit for service, but the men's training was below average because they had been dispersed in quarters for a long time. Their movements were slow, the men aimed too high when firing volleys, the officers looked unmilitary, and the NCOs were too old. However, the drums and fifes were well played.

By summer 1782 the regiment was back in South Wales, quartered at Swansea. On 29 July it was ordered to march via Bristol, Bridgwater, Exeter, Tavistock and Truro to Falmouth, where it was to be stationed. The Treaty of Paris ended hostilities in 1783, and the militia was stood down. The Glamorgans marched back to South Wales and were disembodied at Cardiff.

From 1784 to 1792 the militia ballot was used to keep up the numbers and the regiments were assembled for their 28 days' annual peacetime training, but to save money only two-thirds of the men were actually mustered each year.

=== French Revolutionary War ===
The militia was already being embodied when Revolutionary France declared war on Britain on 1 February 1793. The warrant for calling out the Glamorgan Militia was issued on 2 February. Under Col Lord Mount Stuart (son of the previous colonel, who was now Earl of Bute) the regiment marched to Plymouth to begin garrison duty. Mount Stuart died on 22 January 1794, and Lt-Col Richard Awbrey of Ash Hall assumed active command on 21 April. By May 1796 the regiment was stationed at Wells, Somerset, with a detachment at Frome. It the marched to Kent where it joined the Dover Garrison on 16 June. In October it moved to Canterbury for winter quarters.

The French Revolutionary Wars saw a new phase for the English militia: they were embodied for a whole generation, and became regiments of full-time professional soldiers (though restricted to service in the British Isles), which the regular army increasingly saw as a prime source of recruits. They served in coast defences, manning garrisons, guarding prisoners of war, and for internal security, while their traditional local defence duties were taken over by the Volunteers and mounted Yeomanry.

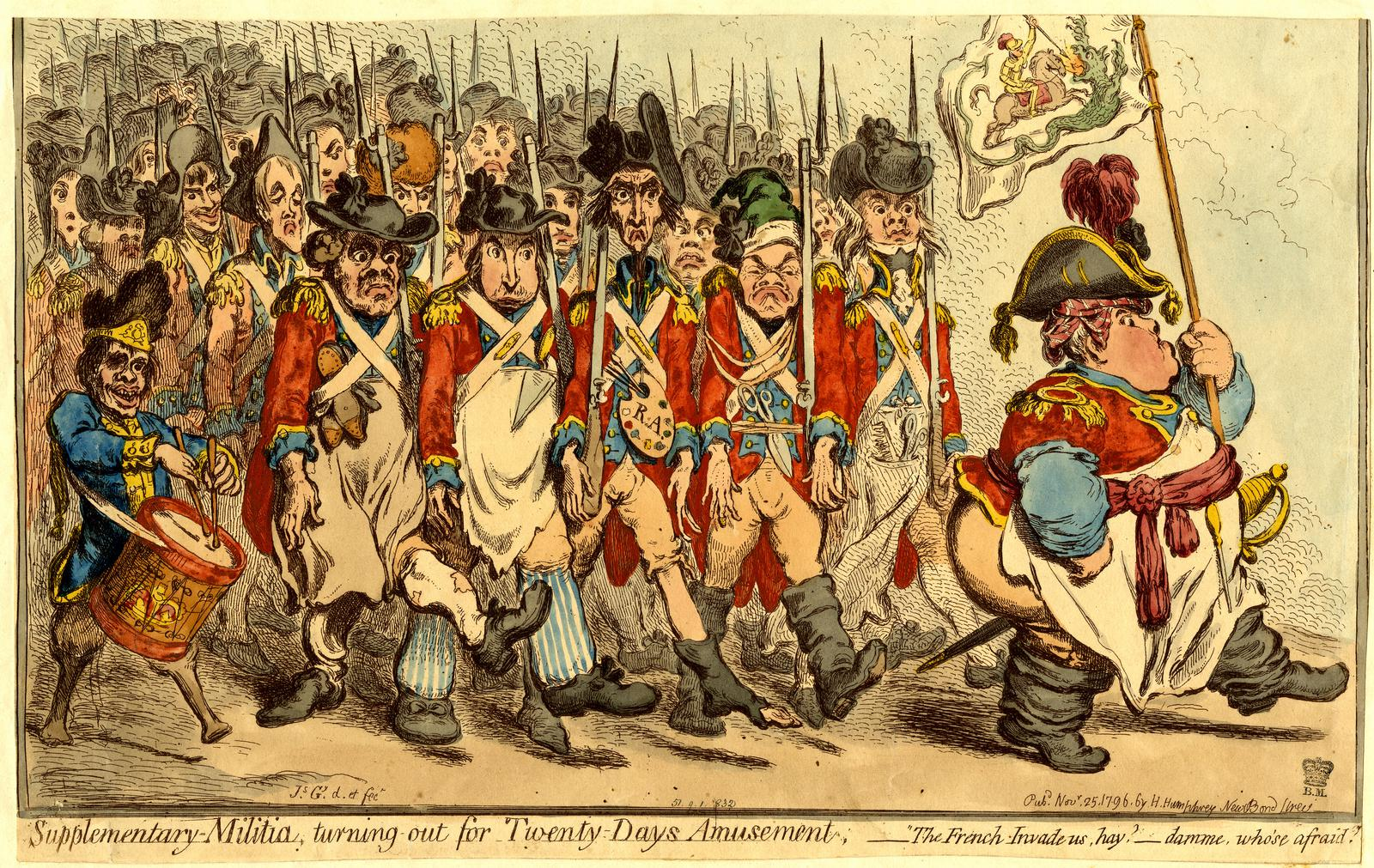
Supplementary-Militia, turning-out for Twenty Days Amusement: 1796 caricature by James Gillray.

In an attempt to have as many men as possible under arms for home defence in order to release regulars, in 1796 the Government created the Supplementary Militia, a compulsory levy of men to be trained for 20 days a year in their spare time, and to be incorporated in the Regular Militia in emergency. Glamorgan's new quota was fixed at 622 men, and in April 1797 the Glamorgan Militia sent a party back from Kent to Cardiff to train the embodied Glamorgan supplementaries (who were to be encouraged to join the 44th Foot). In January 1798 the supplementaries joined the regiment at Ashford, Kent. On 8 July 1798 a general order was issued to form temporary battalions from the flank companies (Grenadier and Light companies) of militia regiments in the Southern District. The Grenadier Company of the Glamorgans joined those of the Bedfordshire, Denbighshire, Derbyshire, Middlesex and Northamptonshire Militia in the 3rd Grenadier Battalion at Shoreham-by-Sea, commanded by Lt-Col Payne of the Bedfordshires.

=== Ireland ===
The Irish Rebellion of 1798 led to legislation being passed to allow British militia units to volunteer for service in Ireland: the Glamorgan Militia was one of those that volunteered and was accepted. In May 1799 it marched from Kent to Portsmouth, where on 15 June it was embarked on the transports Hebe and Dictator for passage to Cork. On arrival it marched to Fermoy, where it remained for the rest of the year under the command of Col Awbery. During the year a number of men from the regiment volunteered to transfer to the Regular Army, reducing its strength to about 400 men. On 22 December the Glamorgans marched to Dublin, where they provided a guard on the Parliament buildings when the Act of Union was passed. In May 1800 the regiment took passage for Liverpool and marched back to Cardiff and then via Swansea to Pembrokeshire. Regimental headquarters (HQ) was established at Haverfordwest, with detachments spread around the county. The regiment remained there throughout 1801. Hostilities ended with the Treaty of Amiens on 27 March 1802, and the Glamorgan Militia returned to Cardiff to be disembodied.

=== Napoleonic Wars ===
However, the Peace of Amiens was short-lived and Britain declared war on France once more in May 1803. The Glamorgan Militia had already been re-embodied in April, and by June it was stationed at Winchester in Hampshire, later moving to the encampment at Stokes Bay, Gosport, here it was reinforced with supplementary militiamen. That winter it was quartered nearby at Haslar. It left in March 1804 and moved along the South Coast, with short periods iof duty at Southbourne, Eastbourne and other places before arriving at Pevensey Barracks on 22 June. Here it was kept on high alert for anti-invasion duties. After a period under canvas it moved back into the barracks as winter quarters. In April 1804 the Glamorgans were one of 12 Welsh militia regiments awarded the prefix 'Royal', as the Royal Glamorgan Militia. The regiment was still at Pevensey Barracks during the summer of 1805, when Napoleon was massing his 'Army of England' at Boulogne for a projected invasion. With 432 men in 6 companies under Lt-Col Henry Knight, it was stationed with the Royal Carnarvonshire Militia, forming part of Brigadier-General Moore Disney's brigade.

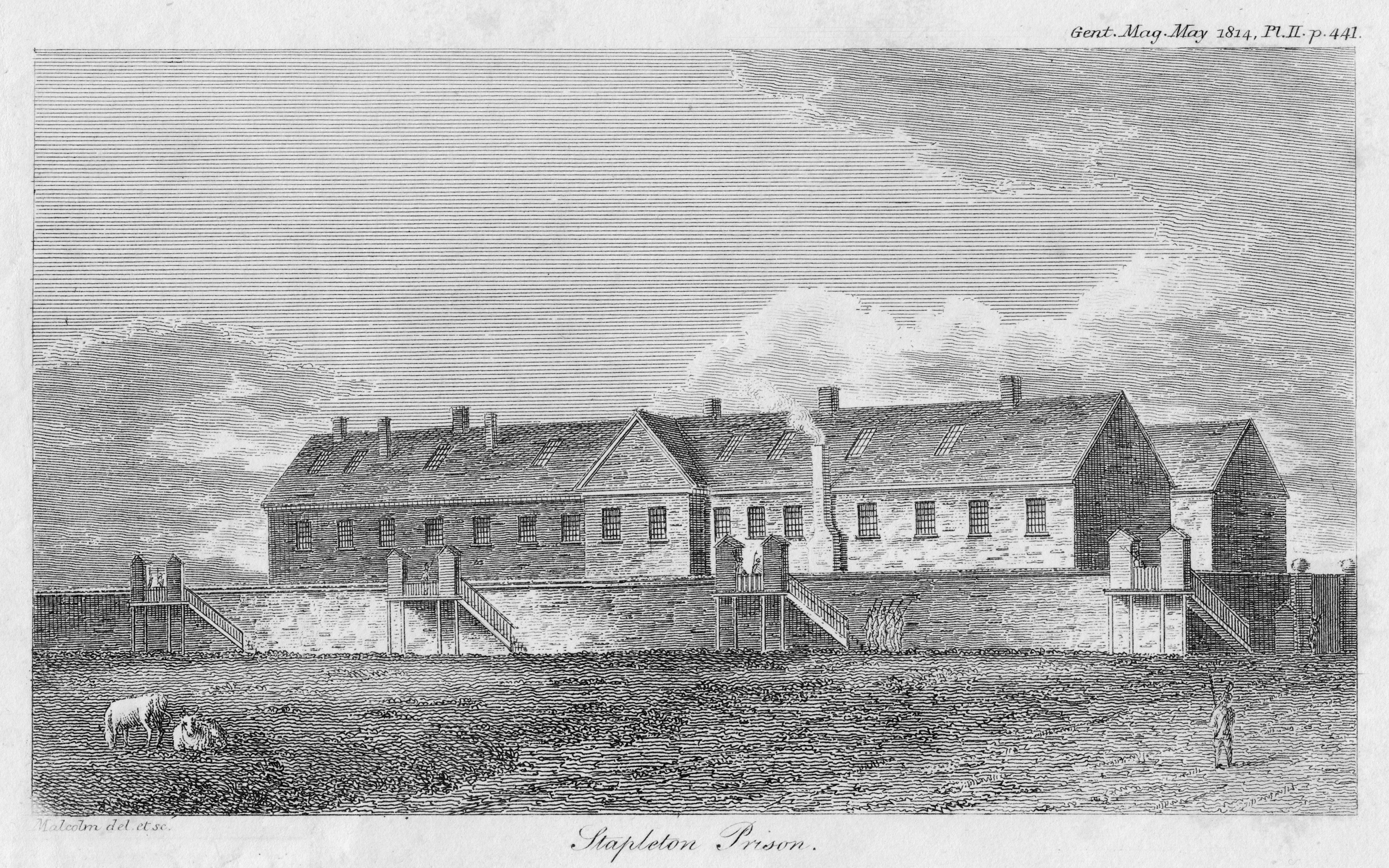
Stapleton Prison, Bristol, used to house PoWs during the Napoleonic Wars.

In November 1805 the regiment left Pevensey for winter quarters at Hailsham. It then moved to Horsham, and then in May 1806 marched to Bristol. There, as well as duties with the garrison brigade, the regiment provided detachments to help man the guns in the Shirehampton and Avonmouth forts, and guards and escorts for the prisoners of war at Stapleton Prison. It also provided considerable numbers of recruits to the regiments of the line. On 10 January 1808 the Royal Glamorgans marched out of Bristol for Exeter, where in June it was brigaded with the South Devon Militia and Exeter Infantry Volunteers at a camp on Broad Clyst Common. Early in 1809 the regimental HQ was at Tiverton with detachments across Devon at Exeter, Crediton, Pensington and other places, including guards on the chain of signal stations across Devon and Somerset. It then moved into Cornwall, with the main body at Pendennis Castle, Falmouth, from 7 May, where it was joined by the signal post guards once they had been relieved by the North Hants Militia. By June 1810 the regiment had relieved the Lancashire Militia at Bristol, with a detachment at Milford Haven. The duties included maintaining the North Somerset coastal beacons, guarding Stapleton Prison, and manning the Avon forts, as well as providing town guards at Bristol. In November the Milford Haven detachment was relieved by the Royal Pembroke Militia and rejoined HQ at Bristol. By now the regiment was well short of its establishment of 483 (six companies), many men having transferred to the Regulars, and the regiment was allowed to recruit volunteers 'by beat of drum' in Glamorgan and surrounding counties.

=== Glamorgan Local Militia ===
While the Regular Militia were the mainstay of national defence during the Napoleonic Wars, they were supplemented from 1808 by the Local Militia, which were part-time and only to be used within their own districts. These were raised to counter the declining numbers of Volunteers, and if their ranks could not be filled voluntarily the militia ballot was employed. Even though Glamorgan's quote was 2418 – six times the number of the county's Regular Militia – there was no difficulty in obtaining men willing to transfer from the Volunteers, and only about 90 men were required by ballot. The men were divided into three regiments that began their service on 24 September 1808:

- East Glamorgan Local Militia, under Lt-Col Commandant John Price and mainly drawn from the former 2nd or East Glamorgan Volunteer Infantry that he had commanded
- Central Glamorgan Local Militia, under Lt-Col Cmdt Rowley Lascelles, drawn mainly from Lascelles' Glamorgan Riflemen and the Glamorgan (Prince of Wales's) Fuzileers commanded by William Vaughan who became the new regiment's second lt-col
- West Glamorgan Local Militia, under Lt-Col Cmdt John Llewellyn of Penllergaer and drawn mainly from his 1st or West Glamorgan Volunteer Infantry and Major Thomas Lockwood's Fforest Riflemen

The regiments began their first training in April and May 1809, the Eastern Regiment at Cardiff, the Western and Central Regiments at Swansea; subsequently the Central Regiment trained at Cardiff and Cowbridge. The Local Militia proved less popular that the Volunteers, and few men chose to re-engage when their four years' service expired in 1812; they were replaced by balloted men. However, in 1814 200 mainly balloted men of the Central Regiment volunteered for guard duty at Stapleton Prison, outside their county. The Eastern and Central Regiments carried out their last training in 1814, the Western in 1815, in which year the regiments were stood down. The Local Militia was disbanded in 1816.

== Royal Glamorgan Light Infantry ==
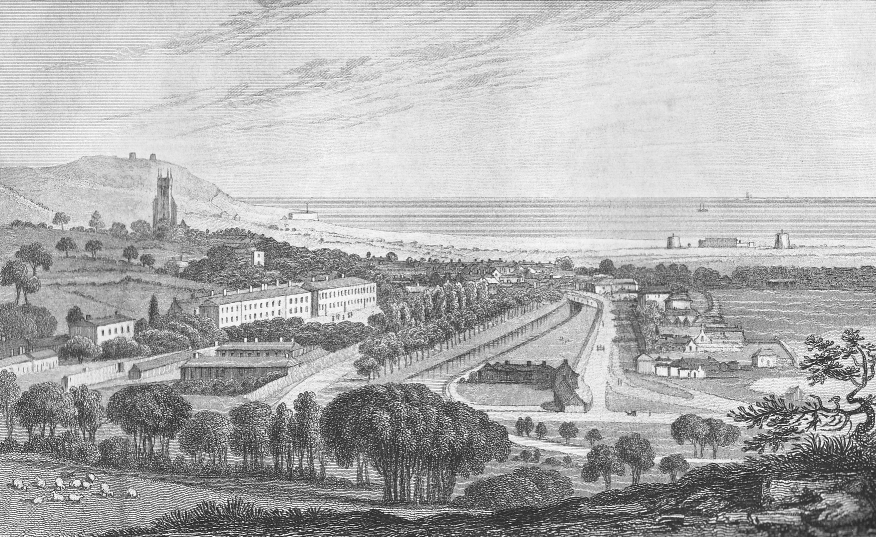
Hythe, showing the Royal Military Canal and the line of Martello towers along the coast.

In March 1812 the Royal Glamorgan Militia was converted to the Light infantry role, entailing changes to its uniform and training, and it became the Royal Glamorgan Light Infantry (RGLI). In June that year it left Bristol and marched to the East Coast of England, where it was stationed at North Yarmouth for the summer. In September it marched into Kent to winter quarters at Ramsgate, with a company at Margate and a detachment at Westgate. On 31 December it moved to Canterbury, where it stayed in 1813 with a detachment at Ashford. There was a large garrison at Canterbury, and regiments were regularly exercised. In November 1813 the regiment was relieved at Canterbury and joined the garrison at Hythe, where the duties included manning the chain of Martello towers and providing working parties for the Royal Staff Corps engaged in military engineering, such as the Royal Military Canal. While at Hythe the regiment volunteered for active service; while this offer was not accepted, large numbers of the men transferred to the regiments of the line, the Royal Staff Corps and other services. Napoleon abdicated in April 1814, and with the war ending the militia recruiting parties were ordered to cease their activity. The regiment marched back to Bristol, where it was engaged in escorting French prisoners from Stapleton to Portsmouth. It then marched back to Cardiff where on 25 June the men were paid off and it was disembodied.

Napoleon escaped from Elba in 1815 and the war was resumed. To relieve the regulars for the Waterloo campaign some of the disembodied militia was recalled for garrison duty. In April the RGLI was ordered to recruit up to strength, and it was embodied at Cardiff on 7 July. On 12 August the regiment set out for Swansea, but was re-routed to Bristol. On 8 September the RGLI and the Worcestershire Militia were ordered to embark in transports from Bristol to Waterford in Ireland. Disembarking on 20 September, the RGLI was sent to Youghal, where it took up its station on 8 October. On 26 January 1816 it moved to Clonmel, where it was stationed until ordered back to England on 22 April. It embarked at Cobh of Cork on 29 April, arriving back at Bristol on 6 May. It was then marched back to Cardiff and disembodied on 17 May 1816.

=== Long peace ===
There was another long peace after Waterloo and the militia were neglected, though the RGLI was more active than most regiments. In mid-October 1816 a series of strikes at the ironworks of South Wales led to the permanent staff of the RGLI being called out to aid the civil power. The adjutant, Capt Ray, led his 24 armed sergeants and buglers by coach to Merthyr Tydfil, reporting to the magistrates at the Castle Inn on 18 October. Ray organised a defence and later in the day was reinforced by a detachment of 120 men of the 55th Foot and the Swansea Troop of the Glamorgan Yeomanry. Towards the end of the day about 8000 strikers assembled, and when they refused to disperse after the Riot Act had been read, the magistrates ordered the Yeomanry to disperse them. This they accomplished without bloodshed using only the flat of their swords, and around 30 arrests were made. The RGLI staff remained at Merthyr for 10 days, but the presence of the regulars allowed them to return to Cardiff. In March 1818 the permanent staff were deployed to prevent looting of a cargo ship wrecked at Aberthaw, and in May that year they prevented a riot in Cardiff.

Militia ballots were periodically held but the regiments were only assembled for training in 1821, 1825 and 1831. Meanwhile, the permanent staffs were reduced in 1829: the RGKI now had only the adjutant, 11 NCOs and four buglers, accommodated at the St Mary Street Armoury. The regimental band was privately funded by the colonel, the Marquess of Bute, and gave weekly public concerts in the grounds of his residence, Cardiff Castle.

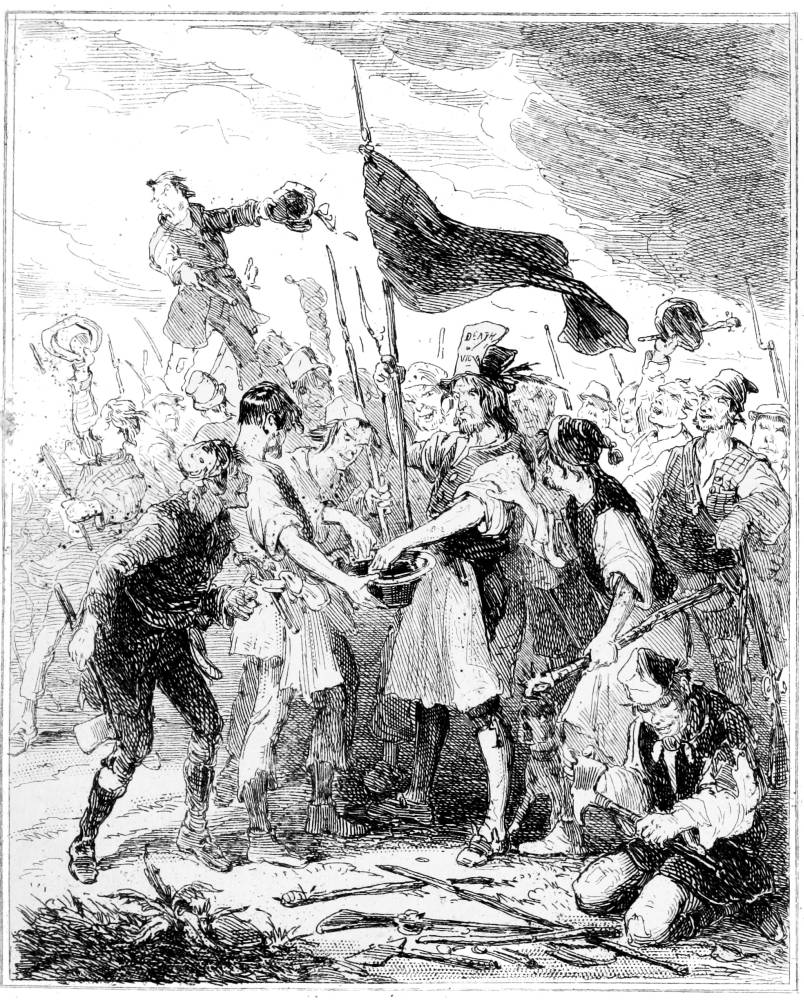
Later depiction of the Merthyr Rising, with armed rioters raising the red flag.

The militia ballot was enforced for the last time in March 1831 during another period of industrial unrest. It was unpopular in South Wales because of the likelihood of the militia being used in support of the civil power against strikers. The RGLI assembled at Cardiff for 28 days' training from 12 May, with very few men having any previous military experience. On 3 June the regiment's permanent staff and a detachment of militiamen under training were despatched under Lt-Col Richard Morgan of Llandough Castle to Merthyr, where a detachment of the 93rd Highlanders were struggling with rioters outside the Castle Inn where negotiations with the employers had broken down (the Merthyr Rising). Rioters tried to disarm the Highlanders, who opened fire, killing and wounding many in the crowd, while suffering several wounded themselves. Reinforced by the RGLI detachment and the Cardiff troop of the Glamorgan Yeomanry, the Highlanders withdrew to Pen y Darren House. Next day the strikers ambushed two detachments of Yeomanry but withdrew from Pen y Darren House on seeing that it was well guarded. However, on 6 June they again approached the house and refused to disperse when the Riot Act was read. The magistrates thereupon handed over to Lt-Col Morgan who, giving the words of command slowly and clearly, ordered the Highlanders and Militia to load, and the Yeomanry to draw sabres. At this the rioters gave way and were dispersed by the Yeomanry without further casualties.

In 1835–6 the permanent staffs of militia regiments were further educed, and all weapons except those of the staff were withdrawn. The RGLI was not directly involved in the Chartist disturbances of 1839–40, but the permanent staff were involved in training special constables. After 1831 neither ballots nor training were held for the militia, though officers continued to be commissioned: following the death of the Marquess of Bute, Charles Kemeys-Tynte, MP, formerly lt-col of the West Somerset Yeomanry, was appointed colonel of the RGLI on 4 January 1849. He was joined on 3 April that year by Lt-Col J.N. Lucas and Maj Sir Charles Morgan, 3rd Baronet, formerly of the Glamorgan Yeomanry.

== 1852 reforms ==
The Militia of the United Kingdom was revived by the Militia Act 1852, enacted during a period of international tension. As before, units were raised and administered on a county basis, and filled by voluntary enlistment (although conscription by means of the militia ballot might be used if the counties failed to meet their quotas). Training was for 56 days on enlistment, then for 21–28 days per year, during which the men received full army pay. Under the Act, militia units could be embodied by Royal Proclamation for full-time service in three circumstances:

1. 'Whenever a state of war exists between Her Majesty and any foreign power'.
2. 'In all cases of invasion or upon imminent danger thereof'.
3. 'In all cases of rebellion or insurrection'.

The RGLI was rapidly revived, with recruitment well advanced by early 1853. The regiment's 900 recruits assembled at Cardiff on 20 May 1853 for 28 days' training under the permanent staff supported by instructors from the 73rd Foot and 85th Foot. Some of the men were housed in Longcross Barracks, but the majority were billeted in inns and lodging houses around the town. The drill ground was Cardiff Arms Field and the armoury and store was at the Old Giold Hall.

The 1852 Act also introduced Militia Artillery, and a separate Royal Glamorgan Artillery Militia was formed as a new unit at Swansea at the end of 1854.

War having broken out with Russia and an expeditionary force sent to the Crimea in 1854, the militia was called out to take over garrison and defence duties at home. The RGLI was embodied on 4 January 1855 and was billeted in Cardiff, where there were numerous reports of drunkenness and street fighting. Over 100 men decline to re-engage when their term of enlistment expired, and a further 169 volunteered to transfer to the regulars by May, with others following later. There were a number of desertions, and the regiment was further reduced in September when 165 men were given leave to help with the harvest. Although the RGLI volunteered to serve in overseas garrisons and was rumoured to be going to the West Indies, the regiment did not leave Cardiff during its embodiment, which ended on 27 May 1856

From 1858 the militia regularly assembled for their annual training. The RGLI only mustered 250 men in 1858, and fewer the following year, but recovered thereafter. The permanent staff were also employed as instructors with the new Rifle Volunteers. The Militia Armoury and Store was moved from the Old Guild Hall in 1860 to a new site at Blackweir, while the men assembled for training were accommodated at Longcross Barracks or in billets.

The Militia Reserve introduced in 1867 consisted of present and former militiamen who undertook to serve overseas in case of war. From 1871 The militia came under the War Office rather than their county lords lieutenant and by now the battalions had a large cadre of permanent staff (about 30). Around a third of the recruits and many young officers went on to join the regular army.

=== Cardwell Reforms ===
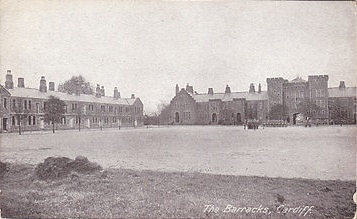
Maindy Barracks, ca 1900.

Under the 'Localisation of the Forces' scheme introduced by the Cardwell Reforms of 1872, the militia were brigaded with their local regular and volunteer battalions on 1 April 1873. For the RGLI this was with the 41st (Welsh) and 69th (South Lincolnshire) Regiments, which were to be linked in No 24 Brigade Sub-District covering the counties of Pembroke, Carmarthen and Glamorgan. Brigade HQ was at Cardiff but the depot was initially at Fort Hubberstone, Pembrokeshire. From 1873 the annual training for the RGLI was held in a tented camp at Maindy Field in Cardiff. The site was then used for the new Maindy Barracks opened in 1877 as the depot for the linked regiments. The RGLI closed its Blackweir stores and moved to the depot, which included quarters for the permanent staff.

Although often referred to as brigades, the sub-districts were purely administrative organisations, but in a continuation of the Cardwell Reforms a mobilisation scheme began to appear in the Army List from December 1875. This assigned Regular and Militia units to places in an order of battle of corps, divisions and brigades for the 'Active Army', even though these formations were entirely theoretical, with no staff or services assigned. The RGLI was assigned to 2nd Brigade of 3rd Division, IV Corps in Ireland.

The intention had been to raise a second militia battalion for the brigade district, and on 1 April 1880 the RGLI was increased from eight to twelve companies, but it was never expanded to a second battalion.

== 3rd Battalion, Welsh Regiment ==
The Childers Reforms took Cardwell's reforms further, with the linked battalions forming single regiments. From 1 July 1881 the 41st and 69th Regiments became the 1st and 2nd Battalions of the Welsh Regiment, with the RGLI forming the 3rd (Royal Glamorgan Militia) Battalion.

The 3rd Battalion had previously been armed with the Snider Rifle; at its 1882 training it was re-equipped with Martini–Henry rifles, and the uniform had been altered to that of the Welsh Regiment. The CO, Lt-Col Gould, offered the services of the battalion for the Anglo-Egyptian War then in progress, but the offer was not taken up. In April 1888 the battalion was again increased to 12 companies, but once again no 2nd battalion was formed. The Martini-Henry rifles were replaced (except for recruits) by the Lee–Metford in June 1895. That summer the battalion trained at Porthcawl alongside the 1st Bn and the Severn Volunteer Infantry Brigade. In 1897 the training was at Cowshot Camp, near Brookwood, Surrey, and the battalion participated in divisional field days at Aldershot with other militia and regular battalions. In 1898 battalion training was held at Slwch near Brecon, while the 1899 training was carried out at Bulford Camp on Salisbury Plain as part of a full division.

=== Second Boer War ===
As relations with the Boer Republics deteriorated in the autumn of 1899, the militia were warned for embodiment. The Second Boer War broke out on 12 November and 3rd Battalion, Welsh Regiment, was ordered out on 21 November. Due to limited barrack space only 55 men per company (a total of 660) were embodied, on 4 December. The companies were then sent to their war stations:

- A, B and D Companies to Pembroke Dock
- C, F and K Companies to Newport, Monmouthshire
- E, H and L Companies at Penally, Pembrokeshire
- G, I and M Companies to Fort Popton, Milford Haven

A draft of 189 Militia Reservists was sent on 16 December from Pembroke Dock by rail to Southampton. Next day it embarked on SS Avoca and sailed to South Africa to join the regulars at the front. On 8 January 1900 a second embodiment was carried out at Maindy Barracks, providing 190 other ranks to replace the Militia Reserve draft. On 17 January the battalion volunteered for active service, and reorganised into the standard eight-company field establishment.

The battalion left Pembroke Dock aboard two trains on 12 February and at Southampton was embarked on the RMS Majestic with a large draft for other regiments, with Lt-Col Thrale Perkins of 3rd Bn Welsh acting as office commanding troops. Majestic reached Cape Town on 1 March and the battalion went by train to camp at De Aar. On 15 March it joined a flying column under Maj-Gen Lord Kitchener on a forced march to Prieska, but the Boers avoided combat. From Prieska 3rd Bn carried out convoy escorts and reconnaissances, and rounded up sheep. It maintained detachments at De Aar, Deelfontein and Kenhardt. The battalion's Maxim gun section arrived from Cardiff on 20 April, followed on 27 May by a draft of 100 recruits who had completed their training, and a further draft of 88 men on 2 September. In early August the battalion left Prieska and together with the De Aar detachment went to Vryburg, where Lt-Col Perkins was appointed commandant and the battalion formed a small Mounted infantry (MI) detachment. There were frequent clashes between British and Boer patrols around Vryburg. In November 3 Welch provided a 200-string escort for a supply convoy to Schweizer-Reneke, which fought off an attack on the outward journey. Returning to Vryburg the convoy was attacked by some 500 Boers for about 3 hours, and the escort suffered a number of casualties. From 2 to 26 January 1901 Lt-Col Perkins commanded a convoy escort to Kuruman, but Boer probes were driven off by the accompanying cavalry and artillery. Other convoys to Kuruman (13–19 April) and Takoon (5–15 July) were uneventful, but a large Kuruman convoy (10–29 August) was fired on from a house flying a white flag and the 3rd Welsh's MI took some prisoners. On 29 September the 3rd Welsh moved from Vryburg to Kimberley from where small detachments were widely spread to man the line of blockhouses and to guard railways. The battalion was concentrated at Kimberley on 4 February 1902 and entrained for Cape Town, where it boarded the transport Lake Erie for home.

The battalion arrived at Maindy Barracks on 8 March where the men were presented with their campaign medals and paid off as the 3rd Welsh was disembodied. During the campaign it had suffered either 31 or 35 men killed in action or died of disease. The medals awarded were the Queen's South Africa Medal with clasps for 'Cape Colony', 'Orange Free State', 'Transvaal' and the date, and the King's South Africa Medal with two date clasps. It was also awarded the Battle honour South Africa 1900–02.

The battalion resumed normal annual training later in 1902. In 1903 this was carried out at Penally as part of the 3rd Militia Brigade, training alongside the militia battalions of the Gloucestershire Regiment and the South Wales Borderers. The operations included a visit to Fort Popton for an instruction in a defence scheme for Milford Haven. The 1904 and 1905 training was at Porthcawl, using the newly constructed ranges, and in 1906 at Ross-on-Wye.

== Special Reserve ==
After the Boer War, there were moves to reform the Auxiliary Forces (militia, yeomanry and volunteers) to take their place in the six army corps proposed by St John Brodrick as Secretary of State for War. However, little of Brodrick's scheme was carried out. Under the sweeping Haldane Reforms of 1908, the militia was replaced by the Special Reserve (SR), a semi-professional force similar to the previous militia reserve, whose role was to provide reinforcement drafts for regular units serving overseas in wartime.

The 3rd Militia Battalion accordingly transferred to the SR as the 3rd (Reserve) Battalion, Royal Welsh on 12 July 1908. (The former Royal Glamorgan Artillery Militia, by then the Glamorgan Royal Garrison Artillery (Militia), transferred to the Royal Field Artillery in the SR, but these units were disbanded in 1909.)

== World War I ==
=== 3rd (Reserve) Battalion ===
The battalion was embodied at Maindy Barracks on the outbreak of World War I on 4 August 1914. The 3rd Battalion's role was to equip the Reservists and Special Reservists of the Welsh Regiment and send them as reinforcement drafts to the regular battalions serving overseas (1st Bn at Salonika, 2nd Bn on the Western Front). Once the pool of reservists had dried up, the 3rd Bn trained thousands of raw recruits for the active service battalions. The 12th (Reserve) Battalion was formed alongside the 3rd Bn at Cardiff in October 1914 to provide reinforcements for the 'Kitchener's Army' battalions of the Welsh Regiment (see below). The 3rd Bn was moved a short distance to Barry in June 1916. Both reserve battalions went to the training facility at Kinmel Camp in North Wales, the 3rd Bn in October 1916. In May 1917 it was moved to Redcar where it became part of the Tees Garrison. It remained there until after the end of the war in November 1918. On 15 July 1919 its remaining personnel were transferred to the 2nd Bn, and it was disembodied on 22 July.

=== 12th (Reserve) Battalion ===
After Lord Kitchener issued his call for volunteers in August 1914, the battalions of the 1st, 2nd and 3rd New Armies ('K1', 'K2' and 'K3' of 'Kitchener's Army') were quickly formed at the regimental depots. The SR battalions also swelled with new recruits and were soon well above their establishment strength. On 8 October 1914 each SR battalion was ordered to use the surplus to form a service battalion of the 4th New Army ('K4'). Accordingly, the 3rd (Reserve) Bn at Cardiff formed the 12th (Service) Bn. It trained for active service as part of 104th Brigade in 35th Division. On 10 April 1915 the War Office decided to convert the K4 battalions into 2nd Reserve units, providing drafts for the K1–K3 battalions in the same way that the SR was doing for the Regular battalions. The Welsh battalion became 12th (Reserve) Battalion and moved to Kinmel Camp in 13th Reserve Brigade, where it trained drafts for the 8th, 9th, 10th and 11th (Service) Bns of the Welsh Regiment. On 1 September 1916 the 2nd Reserve battalions were transferred to the Training Reserve (TR) and the battalion was redesignated 58th Training Reserve Bn, still in 13th Reserve Bde at Kinmel. The training staff retained their Welsh badges. On 6 September 1917 the battalion became 230th (Infantry) Bn, TR, and on 24 September it joined 204th Bde in 68th (2nd Welsh) Division at Aldeburgh in Suffolk. On 27 October it transferred to the South Wales Borderers as 51st (Graduated) Battalion, moving to Stowlangtoft in April 1918, where it remained as part of 68th Division until the end of the war. After the war ended it was converted into a service battalion on 8 February 1919 and was finally disbanded on 31 March 1920.

=== Postwar ===
The SR resumed its old title of Militia in 1921 but like most militia units the 3rd Welch remained in abeyance after World War I. By the outbreak of World War II in 1939, no officers remained listed for the 3rd Bn. The Militia was formally disbanded in April 1953.

== Commanders ==
The following served as commanding officer of the regiment:

- Col Sir Edward Mansel, 4th Baronet, from 1665 and in 1697
- Col Charles Somerset, Marquess of Worcester in 1684
- Lt-Col Sir Edmond Thomas, 4th Baronet of Wenvoe, 1760
- Col William Talbot, Earl Talbot, from 4 January 1761
- Col Lord Mount Stuart in 1778
- Col John Stuart, Lord Mount Stuart in 1793, died 22 January 1794
- Lt-Col Richard Aubrey of Ash Hall from 21 April 1794; promoted colonel 19 May 1797
- Col Henry Knight, promoted 30 April 1808 resigned 1825
- Col John Crichton-Stuart, 2nd Marquess of Bute, appointed 1825, died 1848
- Col Charles Kemeys-Tynte, appointed 4 January 1849, retired 1862
- Lt-Col Edward Wood, formerly of the 12th Lancers, promoted 29 May 1862
- Lt-Col Hubert Churchill Gould, formerly of the 31st Foot, promoted 24 February 1875
- Lt-Col Lawrence Heyworth, promoted 14 March 1883
- Lt-Col Arthur Reade, promoted 23 October 1886
- Lt-Col Alfred Thrale Perkins, formerly of the 21st Foot, promoted 15 July 1895
- Lt-Col William Watts, CB, former Regular captain, promoted 4 February 1903
- Lt-Col William Marwood-Elton, promoted 2 April 1913

=== Honorary colonels ===
The following served as honorary colonel of the regiment:

- Hubert Churchill Gould, former CO, appointed 15 March 1884
- Robert Windsor-Clive, 1st Earl of Plymouth, appointed 26 February 1896, reappointed 12 July 1908 to SR battalion (also Hon Col of the Glamorgan Yeomanry, 2nd Glamorganshire Artillery Volunteers and 8th Battalion, Worcestershire Regiment)

== Heritage and ceremonial ==
=== Uniforms and insignia ===
When the Duke of Beaufort inspected the Glamorgan Militia in 1684 they were clothed in purple coats lined with red, red stockings, broad buff belts, and white sashes. The colour of the Horse Troop's cornet is unknown, but it bore a scroll inscribed 'ALTERA SECURITAS' surmounted by a portcullis (a royal badge and motto of the Tudor kings Henry VII and Henry VIII).

The Glamorgan Militia from 1761 wore red coats with very dark blue facings, sometimes mistaken for black. However, the Regimental colour (usually the same colour as the facings) was described as 'Garter Blue' in 1804 and 'Royal blue' in 1854/5.

All three regiments of Glamorgan Local Militia also wore red with blue facings. The Regimental Colour of the West Glamorgan Local Militia has survived in the collection of the Royal Institution of South Wales in Swansea. The centrepiece of the blue flag has the Royal cypher inside a garter inscribed 'WEST GLAMORGAN LOCAL MILITIA', surmounted by a crown and surrounded by a Union Wreath of roses, thistles and shamrocks. The regiment's shoulder-belt plate bore the Prince of Wales's feather and coronet, with a scroll inscribed 'WEST GLAMORGAN LOC. MIL.'. The Eastern Regiment had the Prince of Wales's feathers, coronet and motto above the letters 'LM', with 'EASTERN' above and 'GLAMORGAN' beneath. All three regiments wore buttons with the Prince of Wales's insignia with 'GLAMORGAN' above and 'LOCAL MILITIA' beneath.

The regiment lost the blue facings of a Royal regiment in 1881 and adopted the white ones of the Welsh Regiment, and the new regimental colours presented in 1889 were of similar pattern to those of the 1st and 2nd Bns. On service in South Africa the regiment wore khaki drab campaign dress with a khaki cloth covered sun helmet. In 1902 the universal serge khaki uniform was adopted for most orders of dress, with the old scarlet full dress reserved for ceremonial occasions. During annual training in 1902 and 1903 the battalion wore a bush hat, but afterwards the blue field service cap (the Broderick cap) was worn.

The earliest recorded badge of the Glamorgan Militia was the Prince of Wales's feathers, coronet and 'Ich Dien' motto in white metal worn on the front of the caps of the Light Company in 1778. The officers' shoulder belt plate of ca 1807 had the same device within a Garter inscribed 'ROYAL GLAMORGAN MILITIA'. By about 1830 the officers Shako plate bore a crowned star with at the centre the Royal cypher in a circlet inscribed 'ROYAL GLAMORGAN LT. INFY.' above a light infantry bugle-horn. By 1844 the centre featured a bugle horn with the prince of Wales's device inside the strings, a scroll beneath bearing the inscription 'ROYAL GLAMORGAN', but later versions reverted to the earlier cypher and pendant bugle-horn. The other ranks' Forage cap badge from about 1855 was in two parts: a stringed bugle horn above a scroll reading 'ROYAL GLAMORGAN'. By about 1875 the officers' and other ranks' cap badges both had the Prince of Wales's device above a stringed bugle-horn. The officers' Home Service helmet plate was a crowned star with at the centre the Royal cypher within a circle inscribed 'ROYAL GLAMORGAN LIGHT INFY.', set within a wreath, sometimes with a pendant bugle-horn over the lower point of the star. After 1881 the battalion adopted the insignia of the Welsh Regiment.

=== Precedence ===
In 1759 it had been ordered that militia regiments on service were to take precedence from the date of their arrival in camp. In 1760 this was altered to a system of drawing lots where regiments did duty together. During the War of American Independence the counties were given an order of precedence determined by ballot each year, beginning in 1778. For the Glamorgan Militia the positions were:

- 33rd on 1 June 1778
- 25th on 12 May 1779
- 11th on 6 May 1780
- 39th on 28 April 1781
- 30th on 7 May 1782

The order balloted for on 3 March 1793 at the start of the French Revolutionary War remained in force throughout the war; Glamorgan was 5th. Another ballot for precedence took place in 1803 at the start of the Napoleonic War and remained in force until 1833: Glamorgan was 42nd. In 1833 the King drew the lots for individual regiments and the resulting list continued in force with minor amendments until the end of the militia. The regiments raised before the peace of 1763 took the first 47 places and the RGLI became 44th. Most regiments including the RGLI took little notice of the numeral, ignoring an 1855 order to include it in their regimental badge.

=== Traditions ===
The Welsh traditions of wearing a Leek in the cap on St David's Day (1 March) and of adopting a goat as a regimental mascot were both recorded in the RGLI in 1855, before they were adopted by the 41st (Welch) Foot. From 1893 the mascot was a pure white goat from Queen Victoria's herd at Windsor Great Park, named 'Taffy'. Taffy died in South Africa, and on return from the Boer War the mascot was a captured animal named 'De Wet'. A new goat from the Royal herd, 'Taffy II', joined the regiment in 1903; he was replaced by 'Taffy III' in 1905.

=== Battle Honour ===
The regiment bore the single Battle honour South Africa 1900–02, awarded for its service in the Second Boer War. This disappeared when the Special Reserve battalions assumed the same honours as their parent regiments, and the militia's honour was subsumed into the South Africa 1899–02 honour held by the Welsh Regiment.

=== Memorial ===
A memorial plaque to the 31 officers and men of the 3rd Bn Welsh Regiment who were killed in action or died of disease during the Second Boer War was unveiled at Llandaff Cathedral, Cardiff, on 4 July 1903.

The battalion and its total casualties are also listed on the World War I memorial to the Welch Regiment in the cathedral.

== See also ==
- Trained Bands
- Militia (English)
- Militia (Great Britain)
- Militia (United Kingdom)
- Special Reserve
- Welch Regiment
- Royal Glamorgan Artillery Militia
