= Herbert Mackworth =

Welsh landowner, coal owner and Tory politician

Herbert Mackworth (7 September 1687 – 20 August 1765) was a Welsh landowner, coal owner and Tory politician who sat in the House of Commons from 1739 to 1765.

== Early life ==
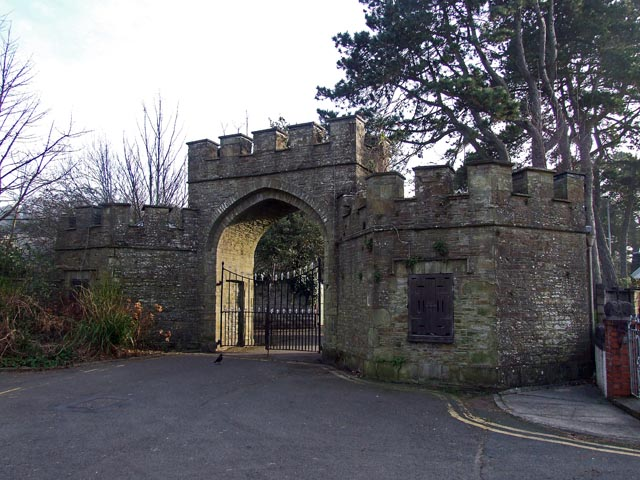
Lodge to the Gnoll estate

Mackworth was the son of Sir Humphrey Mackworth of Gnoll, Glamorganshire, MP for Cardiganshire, and his wife Mary Evans, daughter of Sir Herbert Evans of Gnoll. His brother was William Mackworth Praed. He was educated at Westminster School and matriculated at Magdalen College, Oxford, in 1704. He was admitted at Inner Temple in 1708. On his father's death in 1727 he inherited the Gnoll estate and substantial coal mining and copper smelting interests in the Neath valley. He married Juliana Digby, the daughter of William Digby, 5th Baron Digby on 24 April 1730.

== Career ==
Mackworth was returned unopposed as Tory Member of Parliament for Cardiff Boroughs on his own and the Windsor interest at a by-election on 16 February 1739. He always voted against the Administration, except when he was one of the Tories who voted against the motion for Walpole's removal in February 1741. He was returned unopposed again in 1741 and 1747.

Mackworth was returned unopposed as MP for Cardiff at the 1754 British general election and the 1761 British general election. He supported the Grenville administration and was an opponent of Rockingham. He is not recorded as ever having spoken in parliament.

== Death and legacy ==
Mackworth died on 20 August 1765, leaving a son and six daughters. His son, also Herbert, followed him as MP for Cardiff and was created a baronet in 1776. His daughter Susanna married Sir John Hotham, 9th Baronet, Bishop of Clogher.

Mackworth's daughter Frances married firstly Alexander, 5th Lord Falconer of Halkerton, secondly Anthony Browne, 7th Viscount Montagu, and thirdly Henry Slaughter M.D., all three weddings taking place at St George's, Hanover Square.

Parliament of Great Britain
Preceded by Hon. Herbert Windsor	Member of Parliament for Cardiff Boroughs; 1739 – 1765	Succeeded by Herbert Mackworth
