= David Evans (MP for Cardiff) =

Member of the Parliament of England

David Evans or Yeuans (by 1523 – 1568), of The Great House, Neath, Glamorgan, was a Welsh politician.

He was a member (MP) of the parliament of England for Cardiff Boroughs in March 1553, October 1553, April 1554 and 1559.
