= William Herbert (died 1645) =

Welsh politician

William Herbert (by 1587 – 1645) was a Welsh politician who sat in the House of Commons in 1621.

Herbert was the elder son of Richard Herbert of Wernllwynwhith. He matriculated at Christ Church, Oxford on 17 October 1600, aged 17. He sold the estate of Wernllwynwhith and bought the manor of Rhymney and White Friars, Cardiff, where he built the Friars' House. In 1621, he was elected Member of Parliament for Cardiff. He was Mayor of Cardiff and Constable of Cardiff Castle in the time of King Charles I being appointed in September 1642 to seize it for the King, and to collect the rents of the Earl of Pembroke.

Herbert died after 1645 when his estate was reckoned at £1,000 per year.

Herbert married Ann Hurst, and left his estate to his male heir William Herbert of St Fagan's, son of William Herbert who was killed at the Battle of Edgehill.

Parliament of England
Preceded by Matthew Davies	Member of Parliament for Cardiff; 1621	Succeeded by William Price
