= William Herbert (Royalist) =

William Herbert (died 23 October 1642) was a Welsh politician who sat in the House of Commons from 1640 to 1642. He was killed fighting in the Royalist army in the English Civil War.

Herbert was the son of William Herbert of Cogan Pill. He had an estate of £1,000 a year.

In April 1640, Herbert was elected Member of Parliament for Cardiff in the Short Parliament. He was re-elected MP for Cardiff for the Long Parliament in November 1640. He was a Lieutenant-Colonel in the Royalist army and died fighting at the Battle of Edgehill on 23 October 1642.

Herbert married firstly Elizabeth Thomas, daughter of Edward Thomas of Wenvoe, and secondly Jane Bussy. Their son William inherited the estates of William junior's great-uncle, William Herbert (died 1645).

Parliament of England
Vacant Parliament suspended since 1629	Member of Parliament for Cardiff; 1640–1642	Succeeded by Algernon Sidney
