= James Crichton-Stuart =

British soldier and politician

Lieutenant-Colonel James Frederick Dudley Crichton-Stuart (17 February 1824 – 24 October 1891) was a British soldier and Liberal politician.

Crichton-Stuart was the son of Lord Patrick Crichton-Stuart and a great-great-grandson of Prime Minister John Stuart, 3rd Earl of Bute. His mother was Hannah, daughter of William Tighe, MP. He served with the Grenadier Guards and achieved the rank of lieutenant-colonel. In 1859 he was returned to Parliament for Cardiff, a seat previously held by his father, and represented this constituency in the House of Commons until 1880. Between 1859 and 1891 he also served as Lord-Lieutenant of Buteshire.

Crichton-Stuart married Gertrude Frances, daughter of Sir George Hamilton Seymour, in 1864. They had several children. Crichton-Stuart died in October 1891, aged 67. His wife survived him by eighteen years and died in December 1909.

Parliament of the United Kingdom
| Preceded by Walter Coffin | Member of Parliament for Cardiff; 1857–1880 | Succeeded by Sir Edward Reed |
Honorary titles
| Preceded by Lord Patrick Crichton-Stuart | Lord Lieutenant of Buteshire; 1859–1891 | Succeeded by The Marquess of Bute |
