= Lord Lieutenant of Buteshire =

Ceremonial officer in Buteshire, Scotland

This is a list of people who have served as Lord Lieutenant of Buteshire. The post was established in 1794 and abolished in 1975, being replaced by the Lord Lieutenant of Argyll and Bute and the Lord Lieutenant of Ayrshire and Arran.

- John Stuart, 1st Marquess of Bute 17 March 1794 – 16 November 1814
- John Crichton-Stuart, 2nd Marquess of Bute 2 January 1815 – 18 March 1848
- Lord Patrick Crichton-Stuart 17 April 1848 – 7 September 1859
- James Crichton-Stuart 14 November 1859 – 24 October 1891
- John Crichton-Stuart, 3rd Marquess of Bute 13 February 1892 – 9 October 1900
- Andrew Murray, 1st Viscount Dunedin 1 January 1901 – 1905
- John Crichton-Stuart, 4th Marquess of Bute 31 March 1905 – 1920
- James Graham, 6th Duke of Montrose 24 June 1920 – 1953
- Lord Colum Crichton-Stuart 15 April 1953 – 18 August 1957
- Lord Robert Crichton-Stuart 12 June 1958 – 1963
- Ronald Graham 19 July 1963 – 23 June 1967
- John Crichton-Stuart, 6th Marquess of Bute 12 October 1967 – 1975

== Deputy Lieutenants ==
- Richard Carnaby-Forster 4 March 1901
