= Arthur Henderson, Baron Rowley =

British politician (1893–1968)

The Right Honourable The Lord Rowley QC PC
- Lord Rowley in later years

Secretary of State for Air
- In office 7 October 1947 – 26 October 1951
- Prime Minister: Clement Attlee
- Preceded by: Philip Noel-Baker
- Succeeded by: William Sidney

Minister of State for Commonwealth Relations
- In office 14 August 1947 – 7 October 1947
- Prime Minister: Clement Attlee
- Preceded by: Office Created
- Succeeded by: Office Abolished

Under-Secretary of State for India and Burma
- In office 4 August 1945 – 14 August 1947
- Prime Minister: Clement Attlee
- Preceded by: Roger Lumley
- Succeeded by: Office Abolished

Financial Secretary to the War Office
- In office 7 February 1943 – 23 May 1945
- Prime Minister: Winston Churchill
- Preceded by: Duncan Sandys
- Succeeded by: Maurice Petherick

Under-Secretary of State for War
- In office 4 March 1942 – 7 February 1943
- Prime Minister: Winston Churchill
- Preceded by: Edward Grigg
- Succeeded by: Henry Page Croft

Member of Parliament for Rowley Regis and Tipton Kingswinford (1935–1950)
- In office 14 November 1935 – 10 March 1966
- Preceded by: Alan Todd
- Succeeded by: Peter Archer

Member of Parliament for Cardiff South
- In office 30 May 1929 – 7 October 1931
- Preceded by: Arthur Evans
- Succeeded by: Arthur Evans
- In office 6 December 1923 – 9 October 1924
- Preceded by: Sir James Cory
- Succeeded by: Arthur Evans

Personal details
- Born: 27 August 1893
- Died: 28 August 1968 (aged 75)
- Party: Labour
- Education: Trinity Hall, Cambridge

Arthur Henderson, Baron Rowley, QC, PC (27 August 1893 – 28 August 1968) was a British Labour Party politician.

== Early life and education ==
Arthur Henderson was the son of Arthur Henderson, who was Leader of the Labour Party between 1908 and 1910, 1914–17 and 1931–2. He was educated at the Central School, Darlington, Queen's College, Taunton, and Trinity Hall, Cambridge, where he graduated with honours degrees in Economics (MA) and Law (LLB). While at Cambridge he was chair of the university's Labour Club. In 1921 he was called to the bar, and in the same year was appointed Secretary of the University Labour Federation. At the 1922 general election he contested Portsmouth North in the Labour interest. He was appointed a King's Counsel in 1939.

== Parliament ==
Henderson was first elected to the House of Commons at the 1923 general election, as Member of Parliament (MP) for the South Wales seat of Cardiff South. He lost his seat at the 1924 general election to the Conservative Arthur Evans, but won it back at the 1929 general election.

When Labour split at the 1931 election over Ramsay MacDonald's formation of a National Government, Henderson was one of the many Labour MPs to lose their seats. Evans was re-elected, and held the seat until the 1945 election, when he lost to future Prime Minister James Callaghan.

Henderson returned to Parliament at the 1935 general election, for the English constituency of Kingswinford in Staffordshire. He held that seat until its abolition for the 1950 general election, when he was elected for the new seat of Rowley Regis and Tipton, on the other side of Dudley. He was re-elected in Rowley Regis until his retirement from the Commons at the 1966 election. He was created a life peer on 27 May 1966 as Baron Rowley, of Rowley Regis in the County of Staffordshire. He died two years later, the day after his 75th birthday.

== In government ==
In the World War II coalition government, he served as Under-Secretary of State for War from 1942 to 1943, and then as Financial Secretary to the War Office from 1943 until the coalition was dissolved in 1945 at the end of the war.

The 1945 general election saw Labour returned to government with a huge majority, and Henderson was appointed as junior minister at the India Office, with the title of Under-Secretary of State for India and Burma. When India gained its independence in 1947, the India Office was abolished, and Henderson was appointed as a Privy Counsellor and promoted to Secretary of State for Air, the ministry with responsibility for the Royal Air Force. He retained that post until Labour's defeat at the 1951 general election.

== Later life and death ==
Henderson appeared as a contestant on the American television game show What's My Line? on 6 October 1957. He was cremated at Golders Green Crematorium upon his death in 1968.

== Gallery ==
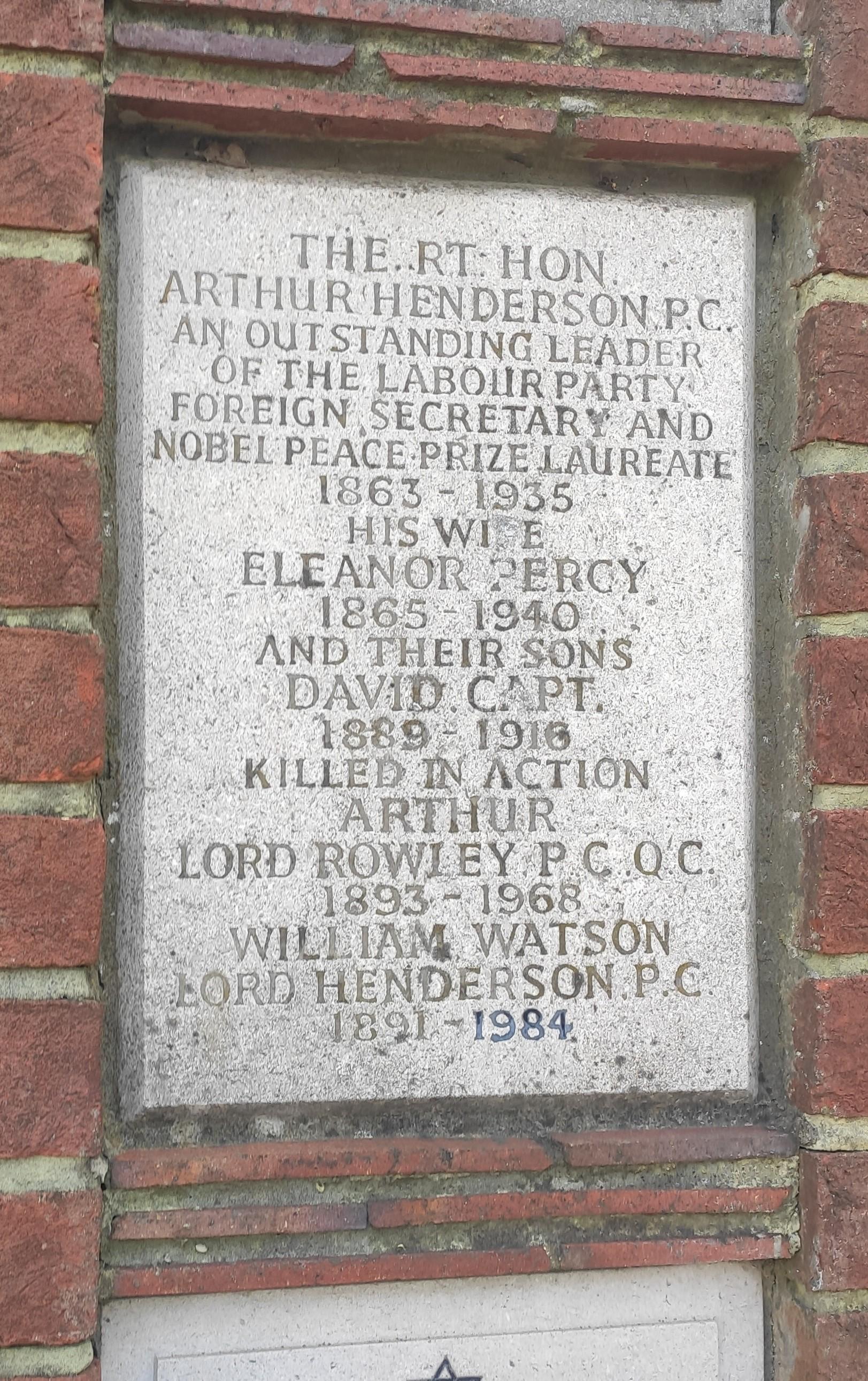
Plaque dedicated to Henderson, his parents and siblings at Golders Green Crematorium.

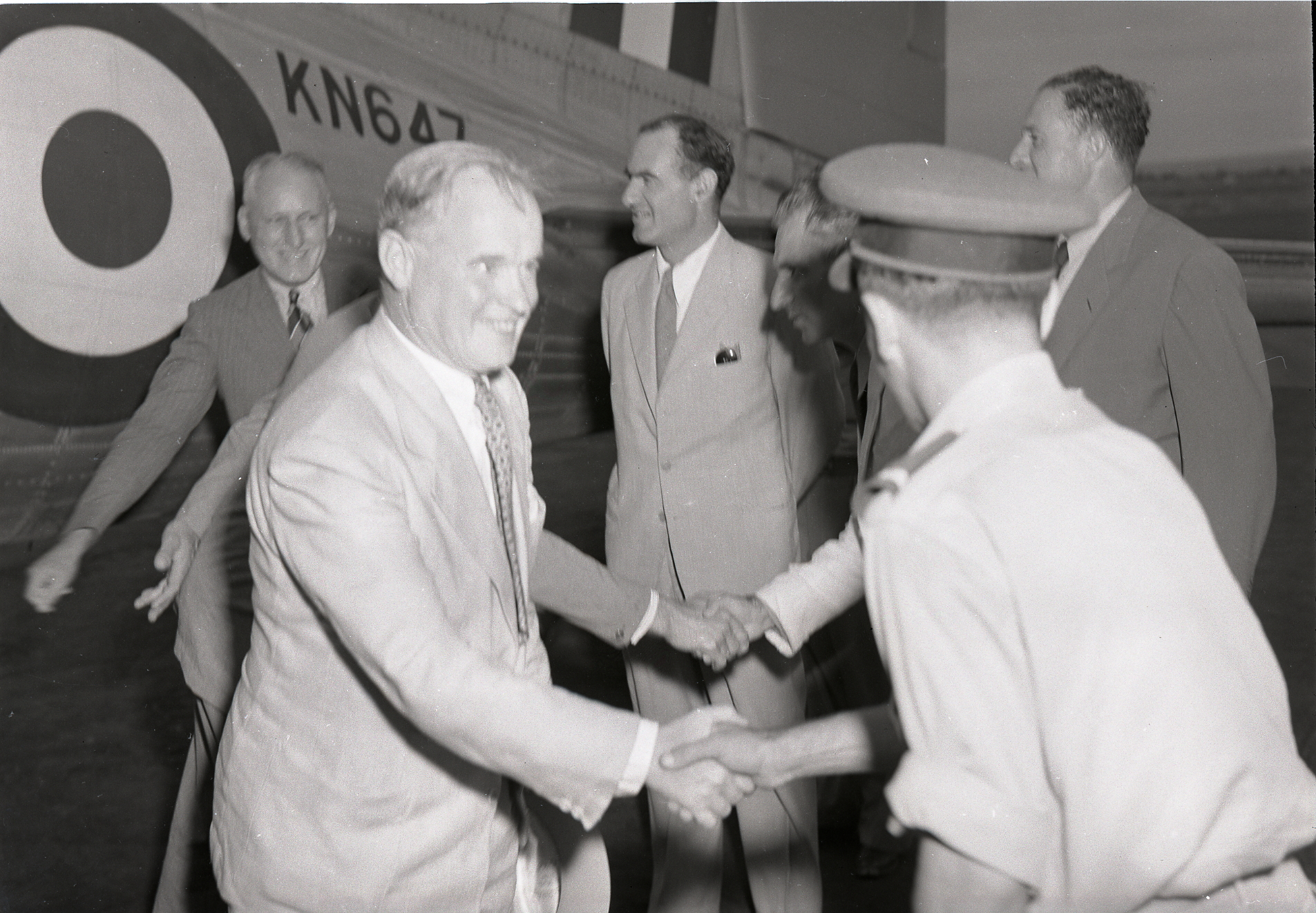
Arthur Henderson on a visit to Israel, 22 September 1950.

== Notes ==
Parliament of the United Kingdom
| Preceded by Herbert Cory | Member of Parliament for Cardiff South; 1923–1924 | Succeeded by Arthur Evans |
| Preceded by Arthur Evans | Member of Parliament for Cardiff South; 1929–1931 | Succeeded by Arthur Evans |
| Preceded by Alan Todd | Member of Parliament for Kingswinford; 1935–1950 | Constituency abolished |
| New constituency | Member of Parliament for Rowley Regis and Tipton; 1950–1966 | Succeeded by Peter Archer |
Political offices
| Preceded by Sir Edward Grigg; Sir Henry Page Croft | Under-Secretary of State for War (with Sir Henry Page Croft); 1942–1943 | Succeeded by The Lord Nathan |
| Preceded by The Earl of Scarbrough | Under-Secretary of State for India and Burma; 1945–1947 | Position abolished |
| Preceded by Philip Noel-Baker | Secretary of State for Air; 1947–1951 | Succeeded by The Lord de L'Isle and Dudley |
