= Walter Coffin =

Welsh coalowner and Member of Parliament (1784-1867)

Walter Coffin (1784 – 15 February 1867) was a Welsh coalowner and Member of Parliament. Coffin is recognised as the first person to exploit the rich coal fields of the Rhondda Valley on an industrial scale, becoming one of the wealthiest coal mine owners in the world.

== Early life ==
Born in 1784 he was the second son of Walter Coffin, the founder of a tanning business in Bridgend, and his second wife Anne Morgan. Coffin was descended from a well known Bridgend family, the Prices of Ty'n Ton, into which his grandfather, an owner of an estate in Selworthy, had married. Coffin was educated at Cowbridge Grammar School and later at a nonconformist academy in Exeter; in 1804 he returned to Wales to join the family business. In 1791 his father had purchased several farmsteads in the parish of Llantrisant, including the area of Dinas Uchef Farm from William Humphries. In 1809, at the age of 24 and bored with the tanning industry, Walter Coffin the younger set out to prospect for coal at his father's farm land in Dinas. He terminated the tenancy of Lewis Robert Richard at the site and with the financial support of his father began prospecting.

== Coal mining in South Wales ==
Coffin faced four major problems while prospecting for coal in lower Rhondda: there was little known of the geology of the area, there were few skilled miners in the locality, there were no transport links for three miles and there was no proven outside market. Coffin opened at least five levels in the area, his first at the Graig Vein (the Rhondda No. 1 seam) was of poor quality and thickness, but his second, also in 1809 reached the Rhondda No.2 Seam which was of a good quality. This prompted Coffin to extend his mineral lease and sink a vertical shaft. At a depth of 40 yards a good seam of bituminous coal was struck at the Dinas Lower Colliery. When Coffin marketed his "Dynas No. 3" coal, later known as "Coffin's Coal", it gained an excellent reputation for its quality and low impurities, popular in metal working and coking.

Coffin then needed to address the issue of transport. In 1794 the Glamorganshire Canal was completed, linking the ironworks of Merthyr to Coffin's intended market at Cardiff Docks. One of the early proprietors of the canal, Dr. Richard Griffiths, had constructed a two-mile tramroad from his own coal level at Denia (Pontypridd), bridging the River Taff before his own private canalwork linked to the Glamorganshire Canal at Treforest. Coffin quickly made arrangements to construct a one-mile tramline to connect his mines in Dinas to that at Griffiths's Denia level and by 1810 the two men entered an agreement ensuring all coal raised in the Lower Rhondda used their interconnecting lines. Coffin now had transport links to the coast, his next step would be in finding a market.

Coffin became a deputy chairman of the Taff Vale Railway in 1846, and in 1855 its Chairman.

== Political career and later life ==
In 1812, Coffin moved his family from Nolton in Bridgend to Llandaff Court in Cardiff, a move which saw his influence and standing increase. He became a Justice of the Peace around the early 1830s and in 1835 was an alderman of Cardiff. He continued his rise in society becoming the mayor of Cardiff in 1848. Coffin became a Member of Parliament for Cardiff (1852–57) as a Unitarian Liberal, and was the Wales's first Nonconformist parliamentary representative. During his five years in the House of Commons, he never addressed the house. In 1857 he gave up his seat in Parliament and moved permanently to England to be near his family. In 1867 he died at his home in Kensington, but was buried at the Unitatian Church graveyard, Park Street, Bridgend. Neither he nor his siblings married and the family name died out with their deaths.

In 1972 the Church Trustees of the Park Street Church removed Coffin's gravestone and covered the grave with tarmac. Although Bridgend Council found no infringement to planning regulations, the actions caused local resentment to the destruction of "an important historical relic".

== Bibliography ==
- Davies, John; Jenkins, Nigel (2008). The Welsh Academy Encyclopaedia of Wales. Cardiff: University of Wales Press. ISBN 978-0-7083-1953-6.
- Davis, Paul R. (1989). Historic Rhondda. Ynyshir: Hackman. ISBN 0-9508556-3-4.
- Lewis, E.D. (1975). Roy Denning (ed.). Glamorgan Historian. Vol. Eleven. Barry: Stewart Williams. ISBN 0-900807-21-0.
- Hopkins, K.S. (1975). Rhondda Past and Future. Ferndale: Rhondda Borough Council.

Parliament of the United Kingdom
Preceded by John Iltyd Nicholl	Member of Parliament for Cardiff; 1852–1857	Succeeded by James Crichton-Stuart
