= William Colchester =

Welsh politician

William Colchester (1513/14 – 1565 or later), of Cardiff, Glamorganshire, was a Welsh politician.

He was a member (MP) of the parliament of England for Cardiff in November 1554.
