= Cardiff South (UK Parliament constituency) =

UK Parliament constituency (1918–1950)

- Former borough constituency for the House of Commons

1918–1950
- Seats: one
- Created from: Cardiff
- Replaced by: Cardiff South East and Cardiff West

Cardiff South was a borough constituency in Cardiff, Wales. It returned one Member of Parliament to the House of Commons of the Parliament of the United Kingdom.

The constituency was created for the 1918 general election, and abolished for the 1950 general election. Its final MP was Labour's James Callaghan, elected in 1945 at the age of 33, who would go on to serve the party until 1987, including a spell as prime minister from 1976 to 1979 after several roles in the governments of Harold Wilson.

== Boundaries ==
The County Borough of Cardiff wards of Adamsdown, Grangetown, and South, and the Urban District of Penarth.

== Members of Parliament ==
Election	Member	Party
1918	James Cory	Unionist
1923	Arthur Henderson Jr.	Labour
1924	Arthur Evans	Unionist
1929	Arthur Henderson Jr.	Labour
1931	Arthur Evans	Conservative
1945	James Callaghan	Labour
1950	constituency abolished	

== Election results ==
=== Elections in the 1910s ===
General election 1918: Cardiff South
Party	Candidate	Votes	%	±%
Unionist	James Herbert Cory	7,922	48.5	
Labour	Joshua Thomas Clatworthy	4,303	26.3	
Liberal	Edward Curran	4,126	25.2	
Majority		3,619	22.2	
Turnout		16,351	57.8	
Unionist win (new seat)				

=== Elections in the 1920s ===
Bernard Freyberg

General election 1922: Cardiff South
Party	Candidate	Votes	%	±%
Unionist	Sir James Herbert Cory	7,929	36.4	−12.1
Liberal	Bernard Cyril Freyberg	6,996	32.2	+7.0
Labour	David Graham Pole	6,831	31.4	+5.1
Majority		933	4.2	−18.0
Turnout		21,756	74.9	+17.1
Unionist hold		Swing	-9.5	

General election 1923: Cardiff South
Party	Candidate	Votes	%	±%
Labour	Arthur Henderson	7,899	37.9	+6.5
Unionist	Sir James Herbert Cory	7,473	35.8	−0.6
Liberal	Walter Thomas Layton	5,474	26.3	−5.9
Majority		426	2.1	N/A
Turnout		20,846	70.6	−4.3
Labour gain from Unionist		Swing	+3.3	

General election 1924: Cardiff South
Party	Candidate	Votes	%	±%
Unionist	Henry Arthur Evans	11,542	49.8	+14.0
Labour	Arthur Henderson	9,324	40.3	+2.4
Liberal	David Evans George Davies	2,287	9.9	−16.4
Majority		2,218	9.5	N/A
Turnout		23,253	78.8	+8.2
Unionist gain from Labour		Swing	+5.8	

General election 1929: Cardiff South
Party	Candidate	Votes	%	±%
Labour	Arthur Henderson	13,686	45.3	+5.0
Unionist	E T Nethercoat	10,030	33.1	−16.7
Liberal	C J Cole	6,550	21.6	+11.7
Majority		3,656	12.2	N/A
Turnout		30,266	79.4	+0.6
Labour gain from Unionist		Swing	+11.1	

=== Elections in the 1930s ===
General election 1931: Cardiff South
Party	Candidate	Votes	%	±%
Conservative	Henry Arthur Evans	17,976	59.8	+26.7
Labour	Arthur Henderson	12,092	40.2	−5.1
Majority		5,884	19.6	N/A
Turnout		30,068	77.8	−1.6
Registered electors		38,659		
Conservative gain from Labour		Swing		

General election 1935: Cardiff South
Party	Candidate	Votes	%	±%
Conservative	Henry Arthur Evans	14,925	50.9	−8.9
Labour	Harry Louis Nathan	14,384	49.1	+8.9
Majority		541	1.8	−17.8
Turnout		29,309	75.8	−2.0
Registered electors		38,461		
Conservative hold		Swing		

General Election 1939–40: Another General Election was required to take place before the end of 1940. The political parties had been making preparations for an election to take place and by the Autumn of 1939, the following candidates had been selected;

- Conservative: Henry Arthur Evans
- Labour: Sir William Allen Jowitt

=== Elections in the 1940s ===
General election 1945: Cardiff South
Party	Candidate	Votes	%	±%
Labour	James Callaghan	17,489	60.2	+11.1
Conservative	Arthur Evans	11,545	39.8	−11.1
Majority		5,944	20.4	N/A
Turnout		29,034	73.9	−1.9
Registered electors		39,220		
Labour gain from Conservative		Swing		
