= Herbert Cory =

Welsh politician and ship-owner (1857-1933)

Sir James Herbert Cory, 1st Baronet (2 February 1857 – 2 February 1933) was a Welsh politician and ship-owner.

== Biography ==
He was born at Padstow, the younger son of John Cory (founder of Cardiff-based firm John Cory, Sons & Co – not to be confused with John Cory, founder of Barry Docks).

He was Sheriff of Glamorgan in 1913 and served as Conservative MP for the Cardiff constituency from 1915 to 1918 and for Cardiff South from 1918 to 1923. He was created a baronet in 1919. In his time he was a director of 35 different companies, and gave much of his fortune to charity, particularly the King Edward VII Hospital and the Hamadryad Seamans Hospital in Cardiff.

Cory married twice, firstly to Elizabeth Hoskin Wills, with whom he had five children including Herbert George Donald Cory, who became the 2nd Baronet; Elizabeth died in 1908. He had two further daughters from his second marriage, to Elizabeth Cansh Walker (CBE), who outlived him by over twenty years.

He died at home in Coryton, Cardiff, on his 76th birthday in February 1933 and was buried at Cathays Cemetery, Cardiff. Following his death, his son's family moved into his former home at The Grange. Coryton House, which his father had built in 1900, became a local civil defence headquarters and eventually a school for children with autism.

Parliament of the United Kingdom
Preceded by Lord Ninian Crichton-Stuart	Member of Parliament for Cardiff; November 1915 – December 1918	constituency abolished
New constituency	Member of Parliament for Cardiff South; 1918–1923	Succeeded by Arthur Henderson
Baronetage of the United Kingdom
New creation	Baronet (of Coryton); 1919–1933	Succeeded by Herbert George Donald Cory
