= Matthew Davies (died 1615) =

English politician (c. 1549–1615)

Matthew ap David Edwards, later known as Matthew Davies was an English or Welsh politician who sat in the House of Commons.

In 1604, he was elected Member of Parliament for Cardiff. He was re-elected MP for Cardiff in 1614.

Parliament of England
Preceded by William Lewis	Member of Parliament for Cardiff; 1604–1614	Succeeded by William Herbert
