= Lord Ninian Crichton-Stuart =

British soldier and politician

Lord Ninian Edward Crichton-Stuart
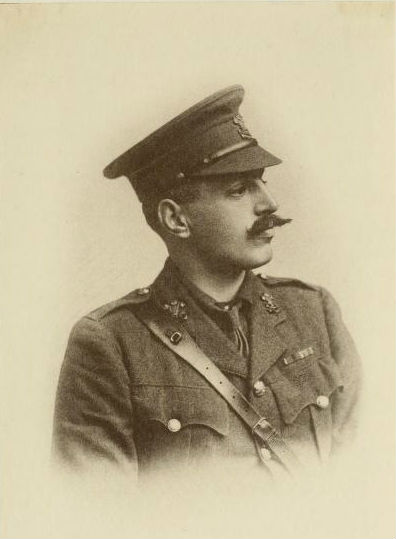
- Lord Ninian Crichton-Stuart
- Born: 15 May 1883; Ayrshire, Scotland
- Died: 2 October 1915 (aged 32); Loos-en-Gohelle, France
- Burial place: Bethune Town Cemetery
- Military career
- Allegiance: United Kingdom
- Branch: British Army
- Service years: 1903–1915
- Rank: Lieutenant-Colonel
- Unit: Welch Regiment
- Conflicts: World War I

Lieutenant-Colonel Lord Ninian Edward Crichton-Stuart (15 May 1883 – 2 October 1915) was a Scottish senior officer in the British Army and Member of Parliament. He was killed in action in the First World War. The second son of the Honourable Gwendolen Mary Anne Fitzalan-Howard and John Crichton-Stuart, 3rd Marquess of Bute, he entered the army in 1903 and served in the Queen's Own Cameron Highlanders and the Scots Guards as a lieutenant. After marrying he began a career in politics, serving first as a councillor on Fife County Council, Scotland. His family having close connections to the city of Cardiff in Wales, he fought and lost the January 1910 election there as a Liberal Unionist candidate. The resulting hung parliament led to a second election in December 1910, in which Crichton-Stuart won the seat.

In 1912, he took command of the 6th (Glamorgan) Battalion, The Welch Regiment. Upon the outbreak of the First World War, he volunteered his unit for service and joined the British Expeditionary Force on the Western Front. After eleven months on the front line, he was shot in the head and killed when leading his men in an attempt to repel a German counter-attack on 2 October 1915 during the Battle of Loos. He was one of 22 MPs that were killed during the conflict and the only serving MP from Wales to be killed.

The home ground of Cardiff City F.C. was named Ninian Park after Crichton-Stuart offered to be a guarantor for the football club's rental of the site. After his death, a statue of Crichton-Stuart was erected in Cathays Park in Cardiff.

== Early life ==
Crichton-Stuart was born at Dumfries House in Ayrshire, Scotland. He was the second son of John Crichton-Stuart, 3rd Marquess of Bute, and his wife, the Honourable Gwendolen Mary Anne Fitzalan Howard, daughter of Edward Fitzalan-Howard, 1st Baron Howard of Glossop. Through his father, he was an illegitimate descendant of the House of Stuart.

He was educated at Harrow School, showing promise in mathematics and foreign languages, and was expected to enter the diplomatic service. To further his studies, he travelled to Kiev in the Russian Empire and became a proficient Russian speaker. However, he was forced to return home after contracting a severe fever and instead attended Christ Church, Oxford once he had recovered. His family's estate included numerous properties and considerable land in Cardiff, including Cardiff Castle, and Crichton-Stuart frequently visited the city, including accompanying his father on visits to Bute docks. He also learnt to speak Welsh. Crichton-Stuart later chose to enter the army and was commissioned in 1903 into the 3rd Battalion of the Queen's Own Cameron Highlanders and then served for two years in the 1st Battalion, the Scots Guards as a 2nd lieutenant.

== Marriage, philanthropy and political career ==
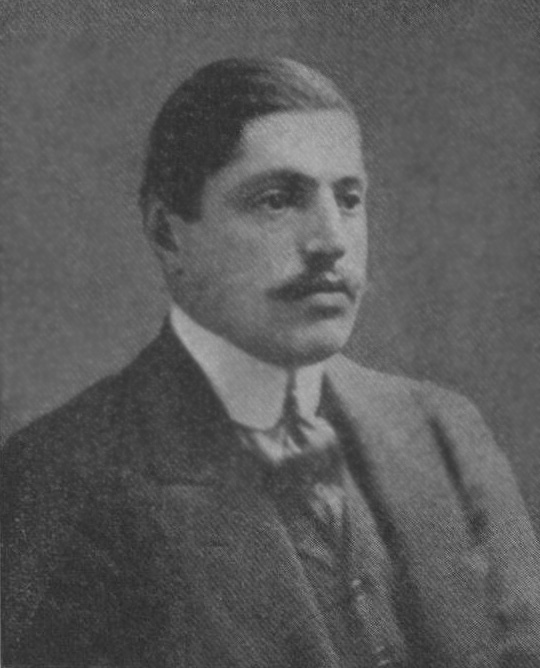
Crichton-Stuart in a photograph published The Illustrated London News on 17 December 1910 following his election

In 1905, Crichton-Stuart met the Honourable Ismay Preston, the only daughter of Jenico Preston, 14th Viscount Gormanston and Georgina Jane Connelan, at the wedding of his brother John Crichton-Stuart and Augusta Bellingham where he was best man and Preston was a bridesmaid. The couple announced their engagement in January 1906 and married six months later, on 16 June, at her family estate at Gormanston Castle. Following their marriage, Crichton-Stuart transferred into the Army Reserve and decided to enter politics in order to be closer to his wife and manage his family's estate in Falkland, Fife.

Crichton-Stuart first served on Fife County Council in his native Scotland and took a keen interest in local agriculture, becoming president of Fife Agricultural Society. He was later named as a member of a committee appointed by the president of the Board of Agriculture and Fisheries to study the rights of tenant farmers when their land was sold or their landlords died. Crichton-Stuart also held the office of Justice of the Peace (JP) for Fife.

Crichton-Stuart's family had a history of serving in parliament for the Cardiff area, his great uncle Lord Patrick Crichton-Stuart having held the post on two occasions. In August 1907, at a meeting of the Cardiff Conservative Association, Crichton-Stuart was invited by Herbert Cory and his supporting panel to be the Unionist candidate for the United Boroughs of Cardiff, Cowbridge and Llantrisant. Soon after his selection, he and his wife had their first child, named Ninian Patrick Crichton-Stuart, on 31 October 1907.

Lord Ninian's campaign for election was based on reform of the poor law and extending the age range of the old age pension. He also stated of his desire of preserving and strengthening the military forces of Britain. He lost the election to Liberal candidate David Alfred Thomas in January 1910 but did manage to reduce the majority by half from the previous election in 1906. Despite his defeat, his popularity among voters was increasing and at the end of the election campaign a crowd of thousands of people came to see Crichton-Stuart and his wife travel to the train station. The crowd gathered outside the Angel Hotel where the couple were staying and, when they left, their carriage was pulled by around 60 volunteers. The procession stopped briefly outside Cardiff Conservative Club where Crichton-Stuart shook hands with numerous people and gave a short speech before continuing to the station. The Evening Express remarked on the procession, stating "never before has a parliamentary candidate, victorious or defeated, been so honoured by the people of Cardiff". On the polling day, Lord Ninian's son caught a chill being driven around Cardiff and later died. He was buried near Falkland Palace in Fife. Crichton-Stuart and his family did not permanently reside in Cardiff until he and his wife moved there in April 1910, moving into Penylan Court which had previously been the residence of William Tatem, 1st Baron Glanely. A second election was held in December 1910 following a hung parliament, in which Crichton-Stuart was successful, taking the seat from the Liberal candidate Clarendon Hyde, with a majority of 299 votes, a turnaround of 1,800 votes in the space of ten months. With a history in the military, the majority of the issues he raised before parliament concerned the armed forces, including the high costs officers were faced with during manoeuvres and a petition to improve the weaponry provided to the British cavalry units.

Crichton-Stuart became a well-known figure in Cardiff and was instrumental in promoting sport in the area. A keen sportsman himself, being proficient in shooting, fishing and motoring, he stabled horses in Cardiff and entered them into steeplechase competitions and races at Ely Racecourse. In 1910, Cardiff City Football Club had secured the lease of a plot of land in order to build a new stadium. During development, one of the guarantors for the club pulled out and Crichton-Stuart instead offered his support of the project and acted as a guarantor for the £90 annual rent that the club had agreed to. In recognition of his role in the building of the ground, the club dropped the original planned name of the ground, Sloper Park, and instead named it Ninian Park. The ground was officially opened on 1 September 1910 and Crichton-Stuart performed the kick-off for a friendly match between Cardiff and Football League First Division side Aston Villa. He was also a patron of the Lord Ninian Stuart Cup, a competition for local football teams.

== First World War ==
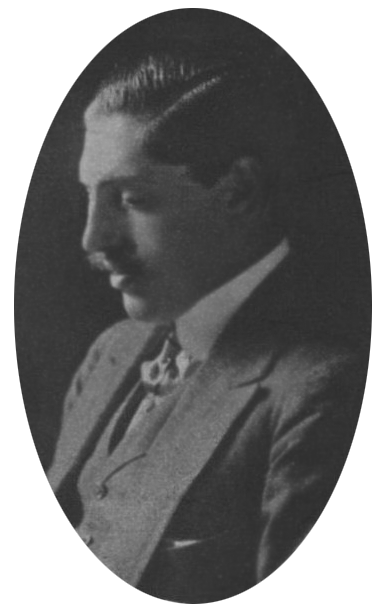
Crichton-Stuart from the Roll of Honour published in The Illustrated London News on 16 October 1915

On 9 March 1911, Crichton-Stuart was promoted as lieutenant-colonel of the 6th (Glamorgan) Battalion, The Welch Regiment and took command of the battalion the following year. It was an experienced unit, being the oldest Swansea volunteer corps, that were often used as a guard of honour during royal visits and Crichton-Stuart's wife Ismay chose the battalion colours of scarlet, silver and green.

Following the outbreak of the First World War, he volunteered his battalion for service and they were shipped to France as part of the British Expeditionary Force (BEF), with 812 troops, 30 officers and 500 horses, becoming one of the first Territorial Force (TF) battalions to join the war. At the battalion drill hall in Swansea prior to their departure, Crichton-Stuart addressed the unit, stating:

The greatest honour a man can receive is that he has been provided with a chance to give, if need be, the greatest that he has, which is his life, for his country. I do not doubt every man on this parade will give it and give it as willingly as I mean to give it myself.

On their arrival on the Western Front, the 6th were initially used to support lines of communication for guard and fatigue duties, first in Boulogne-sur-Mer before moving to Saint-Omer. The posting greatly frustrated Crichton-Stuart who was eager to join the fighting. In July 1915, they were transferred to the front and took part in operations at Heuvelland where they were labelled "the lucky 6th" by other units due to their relatively low number of wounded and Crichton-Stuart gained a reputation as a leader who was "always concerned with the welfare of his men".

=== Death ===
On the night of 1 October 1915, during the Battle of Loos, the 6th Battalion was part of a force that successfully charged and captured a set of enemy trenches at the Hohenzollern Redoubt, near La Bassée, despite suffering heavy losses. Prior to the battle, the 6th had not slept for two days and had marched for 16 hours to reach the location. The following morning, the German troops launched a counter-attack to retake the trenches and the two Welsh battalions that were holding them were split from each other. Crichton-Stuart ordered the digging of a sap trench in order to reach the other units but prolonged attacks from three sides left the unit short of ammunition and other supplies and the order was given to abandon the trench and retreat. During the start of the evacuation of the trench, he was shot in the head by a German sniper after firing his revolver over the trench parapet and died at the age of 32, the only serving Welsh MP to be killed during the conflict.

Several reports state that he may have been attempting to rally his troops in order to mount a search party to locate his close friend Major Reginald C. Browning, who was last seen in a trench that had been overrun by German troops. An officer in his regiment reported that Crichton-Stuart "was to be found wherever danger threatened" and that his death had "cast a gloom" over the battalion. Crichton-Stuart had served for eleven months on the front line before his death. Of the 842 members of the 6th Battalion that had begun the war, only 30 survived. There was an outpouring of grief when his death was announced and his wife Ismay received numerous letters of condolence, including one from Margaret Lloyd George, the wife of David Lloyd George.

His body was returned to battalion headquarters and placed in a zinc-lined coffin in a church in the town of Sailly-Labourse. The coffin was held in the church vault until spring 1918 with the intention of returning it to Britain at the end of the war but a German artillery bombardment damaged the vaults and his body was buried in the grounds of the Bethune Town Cemetery in a Catholic ceremony.

On 30 April 1917 Crichton-Stuart's widow, Ismay, married Captain Archibald Henry Maule Ramsay (4 May 1894 – 11 March 1955), later a Scottish Unionist MP for Peebles and South Midlothian 1931–1945. Together they had four sons. Ismay died on 16 February 1975 aged 92, and was survived by six of her eight children.

== Legacy ==
Crichton-Stuart is commemorated on Panel 8 of the Parliamentary War Memorial in Westminster Hall, one of 22 MPs and officers of the House of Commons who died during the First World War to be named on that memorial. Crichton-Stuart is one of 19 MPs who fell in the war who are commemorated by heraldic shields in the Commons Chamber. A further act of commemoration came with the unveiling in 1932 of a manuscript-style illuminated book of remembrance for the House of Commons, which includes a short biographical account of his life and death.

A statute of Crichton-Stuart was commissioned soon after his death. Sculpted by Sir William Goscombe John, the statue was placed in Gorsedd Gardens in Cathays Park and depicts Crichton-Stuart in military uniform with binoculars in his right hand and papers in his left in a design intended to show him surveying the battlefield. Ninian Road in Roath Park, one of the Bute estate developments from the early twentieth century, continues to bear his name. Ninian Park maintained its name until it was closed and demolished in 2009 following the construction of the Cardiff City's new ground, the Cardiff City Stadium, although one side of the new ground was named the Ninian Stand. A housing estate was built on the site of the former ground and retained the name Ninian Park. The nearby Ninian Park railway station and Ninian Park primary school also bear his name. A chapel commissioned to be built on the family estate in Falkland as a memorial to Crichton-Stuart's son who died at the age of two still stands partially built after work was abandoned following Crichton-Stuart's death.

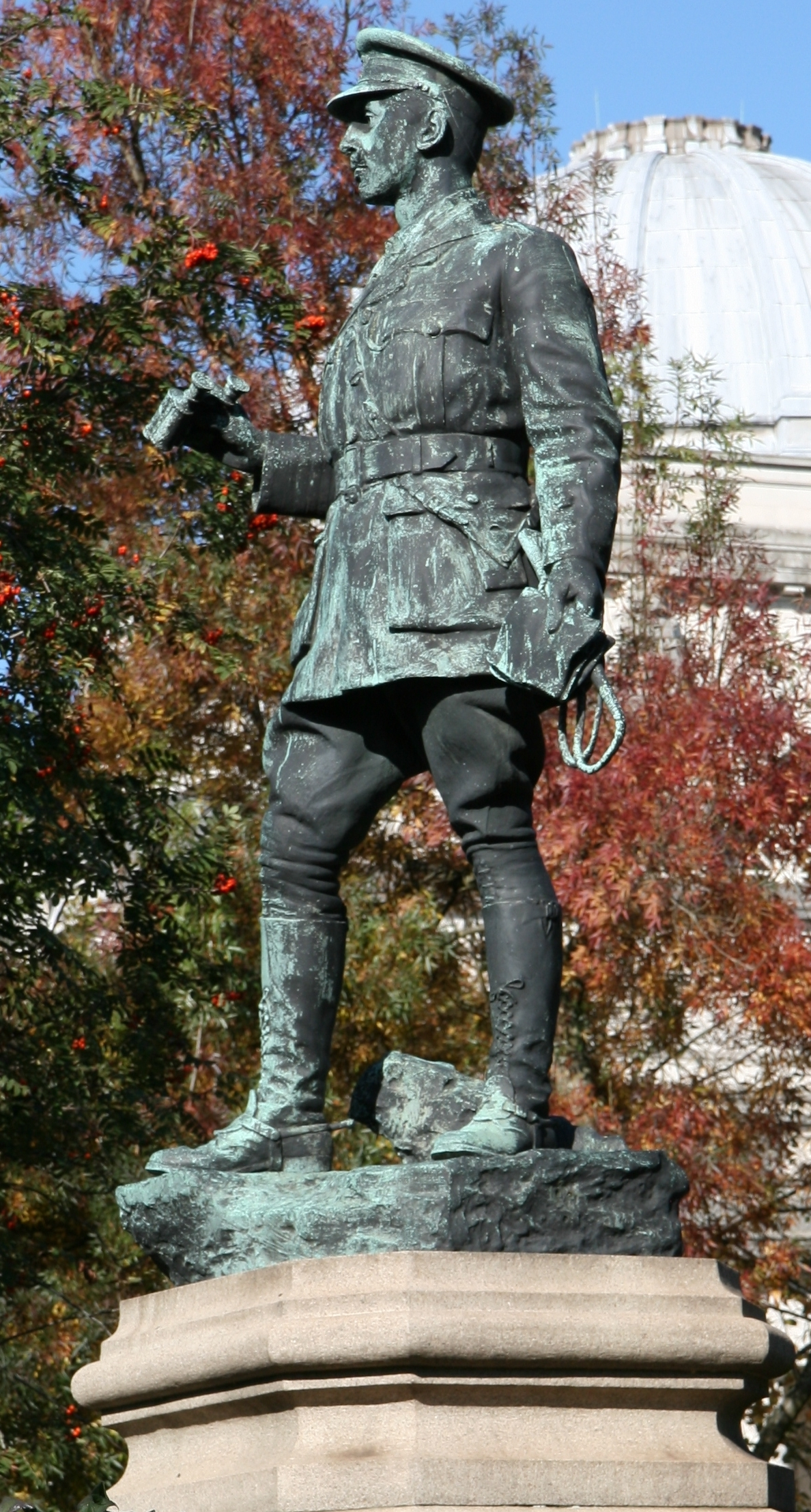
Statue in Memory of Lord Ninian situated in Gorsedd Gardens, Cardiff

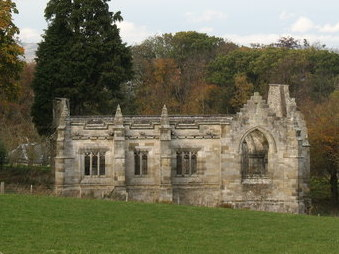
Unfinished chapel at Falkland, Fife, that is also a memorial to Crichton-Stuart

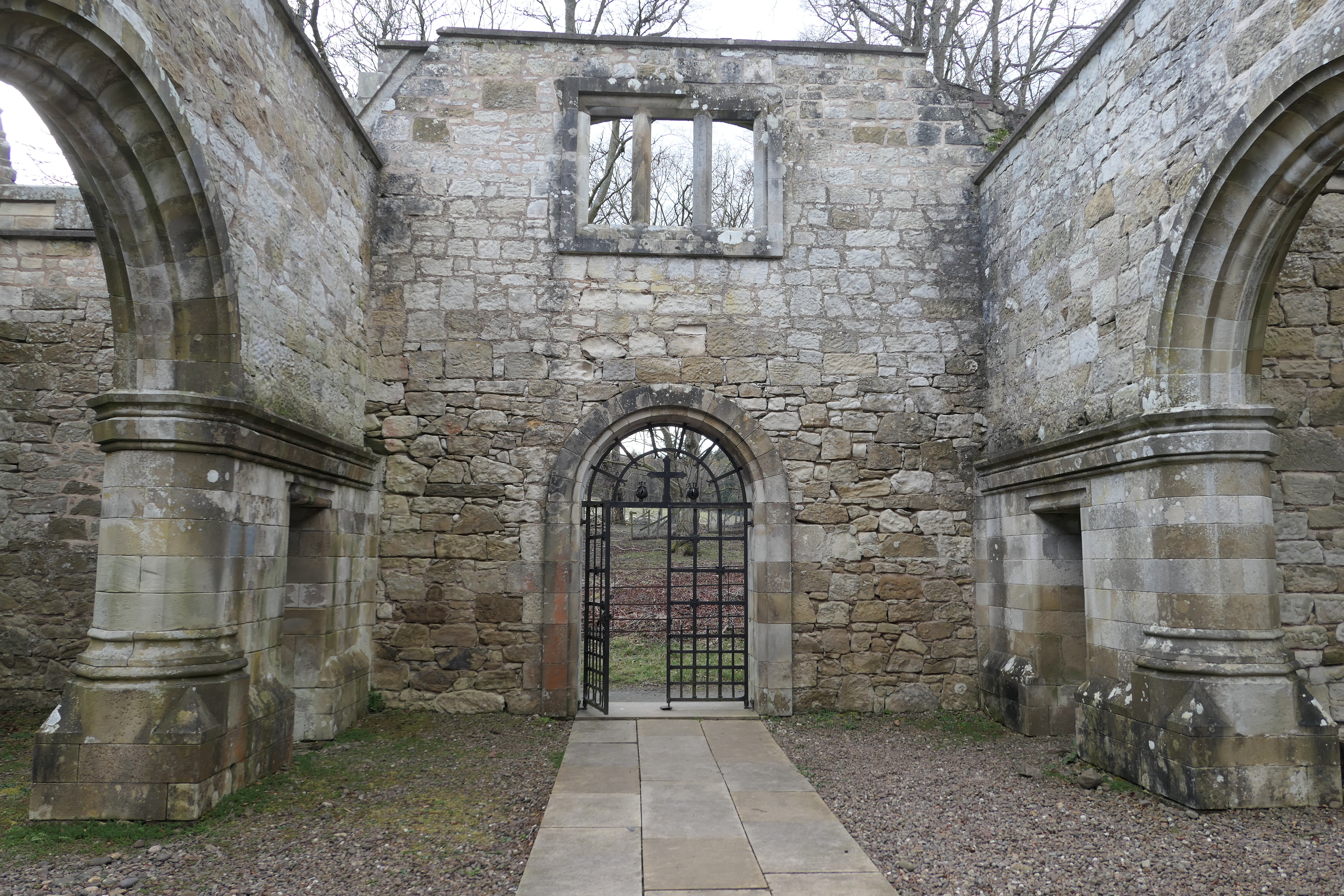
Interior of the memorial chapel, looking west

== Family ==
Crichton-Stuart and his wife Ismay had four children:

- Ninian Patrick Crichton-Stuart (31 October 1907 – 4 February 1910)
- Ismay Catherine Crichton-Stuart (23 December 1909 - 1989); her first marriage, on 1 October 1930, was to John Anthony Hardinge Giffard, 3rd Earl of Halsbury; together they had one son Adam (1934–2010). They divorced in 1936. Her second marriage was to Donald Walter Munro Ross on 30 August 1937.
- Claudia Miriam Joanna Crichton-Stuart (24 June 1913 – 19 June 1985)
- Major Michael Duncan David Crichton-Stuart MC (14 March 1915 – 1981); he married Barbara Symes, daughter of Sir George Stewart Symes, on 1 March 1941. His son – Ninian Stuart – is the Hereditary Keeper of Falkland Palace, has one son and one daughter by his late wife.

Parliament of the United Kingdom
Preceded by D. A. Thomas	Member of Parliament for Cardiff; December 1910 – 1915	Succeeded by James Cory
