= Arthur Evans (politician) =

British politician (1898–1958)

Arthur Evans (1923)

Henry Arthur Evans (24 September 1898 – 25 September 1958), known as Arthur Evans, was a British politician.

He contested the 1922 London County Council election as a Progressive candidate for Lewisham West but was unsuccessful.

He was National Liberal Party Member of Parliament (MP) for Leicester East from 1922 to 1923 and Conservative MP for Cardiff South from 1924 to 1929, and from 1931 to 1945. At the 1945 general election he was defeated by the future Labour Prime Minister James Callaghan.

Parliament of the United Kingdom
Preceded by George Banton	Member of Parliament for Leicester East; 1922–1923	Succeeded by George Banton
Preceded by Arthur Henderson	Member of Parliament for Cardiff South; 1924–1929	Succeeded by Arthur Henderson
Preceded by Arthur Henderson	Member of Parliament for Cardiff South; 1931–1945	Succeeded by James Callaghan
Preceded by Esmond Harmsworth	Baby of the House; 1922–1923	Succeeded by Charles Rhys
