= John Iltyd Nicholl =

Welsh politician (1797–1853)

The Right Honourable John Nicholl MP

Member of Parliament for Cardiff
- In office 1832–1852

Personal details
- Born: John Iltyd Nicholl; 21 August 1797 Llan-maes, Wales
- Died: 27 January 1853 (aged 55) Rome, Italy
- Party: Conservative
- Education: Christ Church, Oxford

John Nicholl (21 August 1797 – 27 January 1853) was a Welsh Member of the UK Parliament and was, for a very short time in 1835, a Lord Commissioner of the Treasury. His father was Sir John Nicholl, who like his son was a judge and politician.

== Personal history ==
Born in 1797 to John Nicholl and Judy Birt, Nicholl was educated at Westminster and in 1816 obtained a place at Christ Church, Oxford. He took a first class in Classics before he achieved a Doctor of Civil Law degree in 1825, and was elected as an Advocate of the Doctors' Commons in 1826. In 1838, on the death of his father, he became the successor to the family estate, Merthyr Mawr House

Nicholl was married to Jane Harriet in 1821, daughter of Thomas Mansel Talbot and brother of Christopher Rice Mansel Talbot. They had seven children, and the family estate was inherited by his eldest son, John Cole Nicholl.

== Political career ==
In 1832 Nicholl was elected to the House of Commons, winning the seat for Cardiff. On 14 March 1835 Nicholl was given the post as a Lords Commissioner of the Treasury, until 18 April the next year. Nicholl also held the post of Master of the Faculties, and in 1838 became Vicar-General of the Province of Canterbury, a post which was held by his father before him. Nicholl was appointed Judge Advocate General in 1841 when he was sworn of the Privy Council, and in 1846 he became a member of the Board of Trade. In 1852 he lost his Parliamentary seat to Walter Coffin.

Parliament of the United Kingdom
Preceded by Lord Patrick Crichton-Stuart	Member of Parliament for Cardiff; 1832–1852	Succeeded by Walter Coffin
