= William Herbert (Captain) =

Welsh politician (1532–1576)

William Herbert (by 1532 – 1576), of Cogan Pill, near Penarth, Glamorgan, was a Welsh politician.

He was a member (MP) of the Parliament of England for Cardiff in 1558 and 1572.
