= 1915 Cardiff by-election =

UK Parliamentary by-election

The 1915 Cardiff by-election was held on 12 November 1915. The by-election was held due to the death of the incumbent Conservative MP, Lord Ninian Crichton-Stuart, who was killed in action in World War I. It was won by the Conservative candidate James Cory, who was unopposed.

1915 Cardiff by-election
Party	Candidate	Votes	%	±%
Unionist	James Cory	Unopposed		
Registered electors				
Unionist hold				
