= Sir Herbert Mackworth, 1st Baronet =

British politician and landowner

Sir Herbert Mackworth, 1st Baronet FRS (1 January 1737 – 25 October 1791) was a British lawyer, landowner and politician who sat in the House of Commons for 24 years from 1766 to 1790.

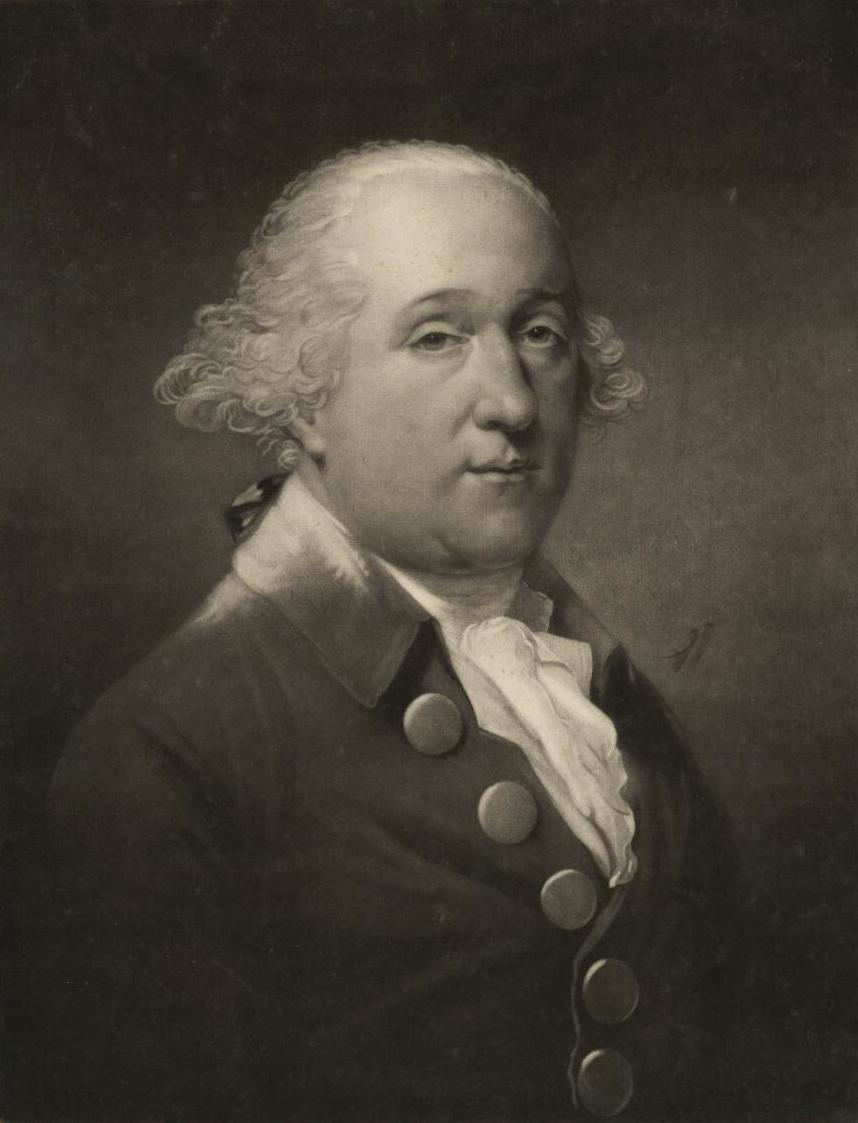
Portrait of Sir Herbert Mackworth

Mackworth was the only son of Herbert Mackworth of the Gnoll, Glamorgan and was educated at Westminster School and Magdalen College, Oxford. He then studied law at Lincoln's Inn, was called to the bar in 1759 and practised as a barrister. He inherited the Gnoll estate on the death of his father in 1765 and continued to develop the estates industrial assets such as the Gnoll copper works at Neath.

Mackworth was first elected Member of Parliament for Cardiff in 1766 and represented the borough in five consecutive parliaments until 1790. He was created a baronet on 17 September 1776.

He was Major and then Lieutenant-colonel of the Glamorgan Militia between 1761 and 1791 and was a vice-president of the Marine Society. In 1777 he was elected a Fellow of the Royal Society as a "gentleman well versed in Natural history and every branch of Mathematical and Philosophical learning"

Mackworth died at his seat at Gnoll Castle in 1791. "His death was occasioned by a thorn breaking in his finger, which brought on a violent inflammation and swelling in the hand and arm, no medical assistance being called in till a month after the accident happened". He had married Elizabeth, the daughter of Robert Cotton Trefusis of Trefusis, Cornwall and with her had two sons and a daughter, Elizabeth Anne who married Francis Drake (diplomat) on 19 February 1795.

== See also ==
- List of abolitionist forerunners

Parliament of Great Britain
| Preceded by Herbert Mackworth | Member of Parliament for Cardiff; 1766–1790 | Succeeded by Hon. John Stuart |
Baronetage of Great Britain
| New creation | Baronet (of The Gnoll); 1776–1791 | Succeeded by Robert Humphrey Mackworth |
