= Herbert Windsor, 2nd Viscount Windsor =

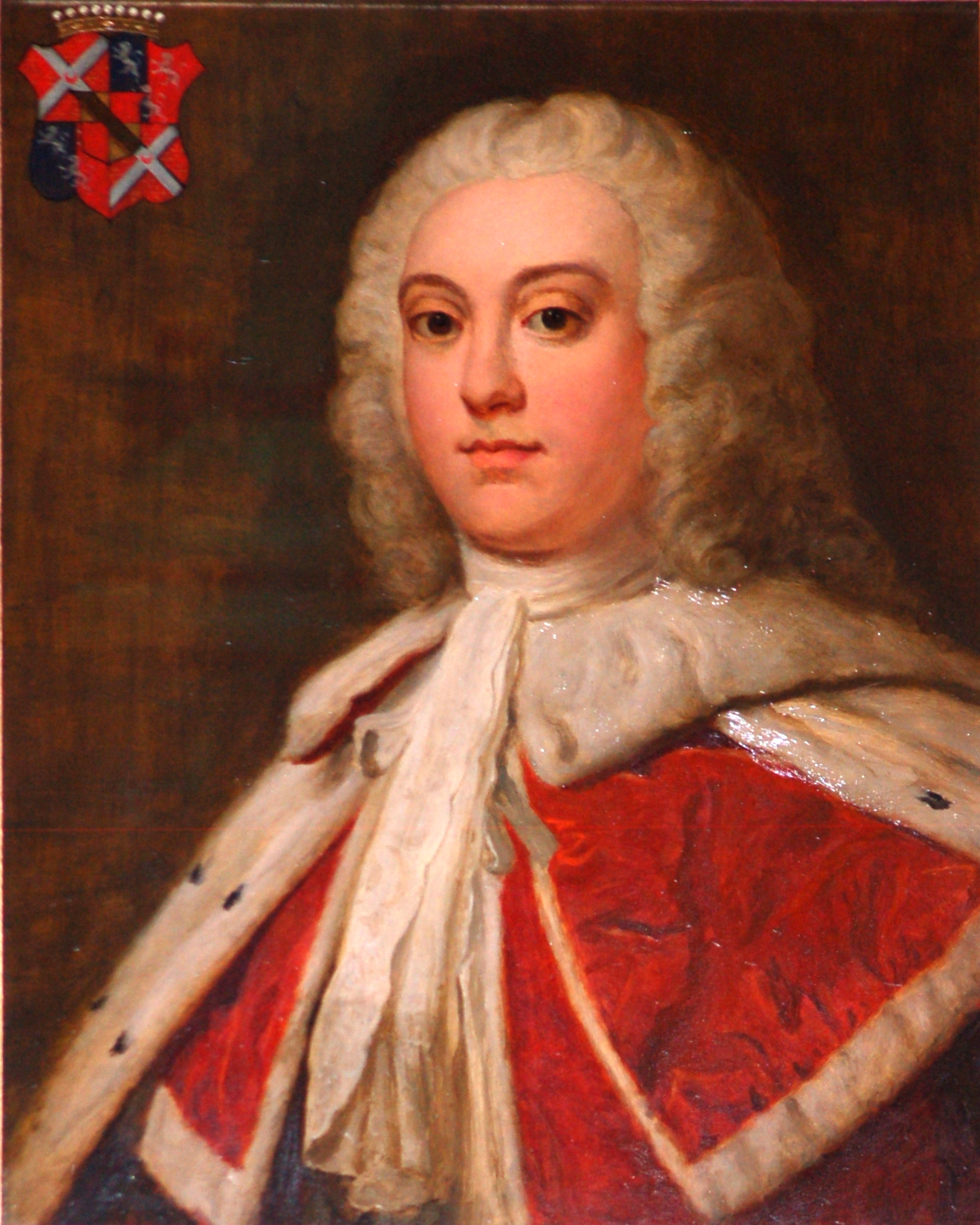
Herbert Windsor, 2nd Viscount Windsor, portrait by Edward Travanyon Haynes. Arms: Windsor quartering Herbert, with inescutcheon of pretence of Clavering (Quarterly or and gules, overall a bend sable)

Arms of Windsor: Gules, a saltire argent between twelve cross crosslets or

Herbert Windsor, 2nd Viscount Windsor (1 May 1707 – 25 January 1758), styled The Honourable Herbert Windsor until 1738, was a British landowner and Tory politician who sat in the House of Commons from 1734 until 1738 when he succeeded to the peerage as Baron Mountjoy and Viscount Windsor.

== Origins ==
He was the son and heir of Thomas Windsor, 1st Viscount Windsor, by his wife Lady Charlotte Herbert, daughter of Philip Herbert, 7th Earl of Pembroke.

== Career ==
He stood unsuccessfully for Parliament for Bramber in 1734 but was instead elected unopposed for Cardiff, a rotten borough controlled by his family. He held the seat until 1738, when he succeeded his father and entered the House of Lords.

== Marriage and issue ==
He married Alice Clavering (d. November 1776), daughter and heiress of Sir John Clavering, 3rd Baronet, a lady worth £60,000, by whom he had no male issue, but several daughters including:

- Charlotte Jane Windsor (1746–1800) (Marchioness of Bute), principal co-heiress, who married John Stuart, 1st Marquess of Bute (then 4th Earl of Bute), who in 1776 was created Baron Cardiff in recognition of the vast estates in South Wales which he had inherited by his marriage. In 1794 the Mountjoy and Windsor titles held by his wife's family were revived when John Stuart was made Viscount Mountjoy, Earl of Windsor and Marquess of Bute.
- Alice Elizabeth Windsor (1749–1772), married Francis Seymour-Conway, Viscount Beauchamp, eldest son of Francis Seymour-Conway, 1st Earl of Hertford. Father and son later held the title Marquess of Hertford.

== Death and succession ==
He died in January 1758, aged 54. As he had no sons, his titles became extinct.

Parliament of Great Britain
Preceded by Bussy Mansel	Member of Parliament for Cardiff; 1734–1738	Succeeded by Herbert Mackworth
Peerage of Ireland
Preceded by Thomas Windsor	Viscount Windsor; 1738–1758	Extinct
