= Cardiff (UK Parliament constituency) =

UK Parliament constituency (1801–1918)

- Former borough constituency for the House of Commons

1542–1918
- Seats: one
- Replaced by: Cardiff Central, Cardiff East and Cardiff South

Cardiff was a parliamentary constituency centred on the town of Cardiff in South Wales which returned one Member of Parliament to the House of Commons from 1542 until it was abolished for the 1918 general election.

== Boundaries ==
Under the Laws in Wales Acts 1535 and 1542, most Welsh shire towns returned one MP, including Cardiff as the shire town of Glamorgan; however, other ancient boroughs in the shire contributed to the expense of the borough MP and in return gained a share in the vote. In the case of Cardiff, the relevant "contributory boroughs" were Llantrisant and Cowbridge, and until 1832 also Swansea, Loughor, Neath, Aberavon, and Kenfig. Elections were often held at Bridgend, which was not a contributory borough but was conveniently central in Glamorgan. The Reform Act 1832 separated the contributory boroughs other than Llantrisant and Cowbridge into the new Swansea District of Boroughs. As proposed in 1830, the reform bill would have added Llandaff, Aberdare, and Merthyr Tydfil as Cardiff contributory boroughs, but in the event Merthyr and Aberdare became a separate borough while Llandaff remained part of Glamorgan county constituency, which gained a second seat. The Parliamentary Boundaries Act 1832 extended the boundary of the Cardiff District of Boroughs constituency to include those parts of the Cardiff parishes of St Mary's and St. John outside the old borough boundary. The Redistribution of Seats Act 1885 extended the parliamentary boundary to Cardiff's enlarged municipal borough boundary.

== Members of Parliament ==
=== MPs 1542–1645 ===
Parliament	Member
1542	John Bassett
1545	Unknown
1547	John Cock, sat for Calne, repl. by Sir Philip Hoby
1553 (Mar)	?David Evans
1553 (Oct)	David Evans
1554 (Apr)	David Evans
1554 (Nov)	William Colchester
1555	William Herbert
1558	Lleisan Pryce
1559	David Evans
1562–3	Henry Lewes
1571	Henry Morgan
1572	David Roberts
1584	Nicholas Herbert
1586	George Lewis
1588	Gabriel Lewys
1593	David Roberts
1597	Nicholas Hawkins
1601	William Lewis
1604	Matthew Davies
1614	Matthew Davies
1621	William Herbert
1624	William Price
1625	William Price
1626	William Price
1628	Lewis Morgan
1629–1640	No Parliaments summoned
1640	William Herbert killed at Battle of Edgehill 1642
1642–1645	Not represented

=== MPs 1645–1832 ===
Year	Member	Party
1645	Algernon Sidney	
1653	Not represented in Barebones Parliament	
1654	John Price	
1656	John Price	
1659	John Price	
1660	Bussy Mansell; Double return, Herbert Evans disallowed	
1661	Sir Richard Lloyd Elected to sit for Radnorshire	
1661	William Bassett Election voided by Parliament on petition	
1661	Robert Thomas	
1679 Feb	Robert Thomas	
1679 Sep	Robert Thomas	
1681	Bussy Mansell	
1685	Francis Gwyn	
1689	Thomas Mansel	Tory
1698	Sir Edward Stradling, Bt	
1701	Thomas Mansel	
1706	Sir John Aubrey, Bt	
1710	Sir Edward Stradling, Bt	
1722	Edward Stradling	
1727	Bussy Mansel	Tory
1734	Herbert Windsor	
1739	Herbert Mackworth	
1741	Herbert Mackworth	
1747	Herbert Mackworth	
1754	Herbert Mackworth	
1761	Herbert Mackworth	
1766	Herbert Mackworth	
1768	Herbert Mackworth	
1774	Herbert Mackworth	
1780	Sir Herbert Mackworth	
1784	Sir Herbert Mackworth	
1790	Lord Mount Stuart	Tory
1794	Lord Evelyn Stuart	Tory
1802	Lord William Stuart	Tory
1814	Lord Evelyn Stuart	Tory
1818	Lord Patrick Crichton-Stuart	
1820	Wyndham Lewis	Tory
1826	Lord Patrick Crichton-Stuart	Whig
1832	Franchise extended under Reform Act 1832	

=== MPs 1832–1918 ===
Election	Member	Party
1832	John Iltyd Nicholl	Conservative
1852	Walter Coffin	Radical
1857	James Crichton-Stuart	Whig
1859	James Crichton-Stuart	Liberal
1880	Sir Edward Reed	Liberal
1895	James Mackenzie Maclean	Unionist
1900	Sir Edward Reed	Liberal
1904	Sir Edward Reed	Liberal Unionist
1906	Ivor Guest	Liberal
1910 (Jan)	D. A. Thomas	Liberal
1910 (Dec)	Lord Ninian Crichton-Stuart	Unionist
1915 by-election	Sir James Cory, 1st Baronet	Conservative
1918	constituency abolished: see Cardiff Central, Cardiff East and Cardiff South	

== Election results ==
=== Elections in the 1830s ===
General Election 1830: Cardiff Boroughs
Party	Candidate	Votes	%
Whig	Patrick Crichton-Stuart	Unopposed	
Whig hold			

General Election 1831: Cardiff Boroughs
Party	Candidate	Votes	%
Whig	Patrick Crichton-Stuart	Unopposed	
Whig hold			

General Election 1832: Cardiff Boroughs
Party	Candidate	Votes	%
Tory	John Iltyd Nicholl	342	64.2
Whig	Patrick Crichton-Stuart	191	35.8
Majority		151	28.4
Turnout		533	77.6
Registered electors		687	
Tory gain from Whig			

General Election 1835: Cardiff Boroughs
Party	Candidate	Votes	%
Conservative	John Iltyd Nicholl	Unopposed	
Registered electors		672	
Conservative hold			

Nicholl was appointed as a Lord Commissioner of the Treasury, causing a by-election.

By-election, 20 March 1835: Cardiff Boroughs
Party	Candidate	Votes	%
Conservative	John Iltyd Nicholl	Unopposed	
Conservative hold			

General Election 1837: Cardiff Boroughs
Party	Candidate	Votes	%
Conservative	John Iltyd Nicholl	Unopposed	
Registered electors		635	
Conservative hold			

=== Elections in the 1840s ===
General Election 1841: Cardiff Boroughs
Party	Candidate	Votes	%	±%
Conservative	John Iltyd Nicholl	Unopposed		
Registered electors		765		
Conservative hold				

Nicholl was appointed Judge Advocate General of the Armed Forces, requiring a by-election.

By-election, 17 September 1841: Cardiff Boroughs
Party	Candidate	Votes	%	±%
Conservative	John Iltyd Nicholl	Unopposed		
Conservative hold				

General Election 1847: Cardiff Boroughs
Party	Candidate	Votes	%	±%
Conservative	John Iltyd Nicholl	Unopposed		
Registered electors		797		
Conservative hold				

=== Elections in the 1850s ===
General Election 1852: Cardiff Boroughs
Party	Candidate	Votes	%	±%
Radical	Walter Coffin	490	51.4	New
Conservative	John Iltyd Nicholl	464	48.6	N/A
Majority		26	2.8	N/A
Turnout		954	98.6	N/A
Registered electors		2,072		
Radical gain from Conservative		Swing	N/A	

General election 1857: Cardiff Boroughs
Party	Candidate	Votes	%	±%
Whig	James Crichton-Stuart	Unopposed		
Registered electors		1,640		
Whig gain from Radical				

General election 1859: Cardiff Boroughs
Party	Candidate	Votes	%	±%
Liberal	James Crichton-Stuart	Unopposed		
Registered electors		1,793		
Liberal hold				

=== Elections in the 1860s ===
General election 1865: Cardiff Boroughs
Party	Candidate	Votes	%	±%
Liberal	James Crichton-Stuart	Unopposed		
Registered electors		2,072		
Liberal hold				

General election 1868: Cardiff Boroughs
Party	Candidate	Votes	%	±%
Liberal	James Crichton-Stuart	2,501	54.9	N/A
Conservative	Hardinge Giffard	2,055	45.1	New
Majority		446	9.8	N/A
Turnout		4,556	84.6	N/A
Registered electors		5,388		
Liberal hold		Swing	N/A	

=== Elections in the 1870s ===
General election 1874: Cardiff Boroughs
Party	Candidate	Votes	%	±%
Liberal	James Crichton-Stuart	2,780	50.1	−4.8
Conservative	Hardinge Giffard	2,771	49.9	+4.8
Majority		9	0.2	−9.6
Turnout		5,551	83.4	−1.2
Registered electors		6,656		
Liberal hold		Swing	−4.8	

=== Elections in the 1880s ===
General election 1880: Cardiff Boroughs
Party	Candidate	Votes	%	±%
Liberal	Edward Reed	3,831	53.1	+3.0
Conservative	Arthur Guest	3,383	46.9	−3.0
Majority		448	6.2	+6.0
Turnout		7,214	86.4	+3.0
Registered electors		8,350		
Liberal hold		Swing	+3.0	

General election 1885: Cardiff Boroughs
Party	Candidate	Votes	%	±%
Liberal	Edward Reed	5,569	50.6	−2.5
Conservative	Henry Harben (businessman)	5,429	49.4	+2.5
Majority		140	1.2	−5.0
Turnout		10,998	87.3	+0.9
Registered electors		12,605		
Liberal hold		Swing	−2.5	

Reed was appointed a Lord Commissioner of the Treasury, requiring a by-election.

By-election, 27 Feb 1886: Cardiff Boroughs
Party	Candidate	Votes	%	±%
Liberal	Edward Reed	5,708	54.1	+3.5
Conservative	John Dillwyn-Llewelyn	4,845	45.9	−3.5
Majority		863	8.2	+7.0
Turnout		10,553	83.7	−3.6
Registered electors		12,605		
Liberal hold		Swing	+3.5	

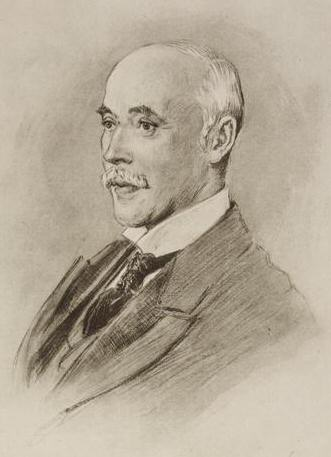
Brand

General election 1886: Cardiff Boroughs
Party	Candidate	Votes	%	±%
Liberal	Edward Reed	5,307	51.7	+1.1
Liberal Unionist	Henry Brand	4,965	48.3	−1.1
Majority		342	3.4	+2.2
Turnout		10,272	81.5	−5.8
Registered electors		12,605		
Liberal hold		Swing	+1.1	

=== Elections in the 1890s ===
General election 1892: Cardiff Boroughs
Party	Candidate	Votes	%	±%
Liberal	Edward Reed	7,226	52.5	+0.8
Liberal Unionist	Sir John Gunn	6,540	47.5	−0.8
Majority		686	5.0	+1.6
Turnout		13,766	81.5	0.0
Registered electors		16,886		
Liberal hold		Swing	+0.8	

General election 1895: Cardiff Boroughs
Party	Candidate	Votes	%	±%
Conservative	James Mackenzie Maclean	8,386	52.6	+5.1
Liberal	Edward Reed	7,562	47.4	−5.1
Majority		824	5.2	N/A
Turnout		15,948	82.4	+0.9
Registered electors		19,358		
Conservative gain from Liberal		Swing	+5.1	

=== Elections in the 1900s ===
General election 1900: Cardiff Boroughs
Party	Candidate	Votes	%	±%
Liberal	Edward Reed	9,342	52.2	+4.8
Conservative	Joseph Lawrence	8,541	47.8	−4.8
Majority		801	4.4	N/A
Turnout		17,883	80.0	−2.4
Registered electors		22,361		
Liberal gain from Conservative		Swing	+4.8	

Guest

General election 1906: Cardiff Boroughs
Party	Candidate	Votes	%	±%
Liberal	Ivor Guest	12,434	56.9	+4.7
Conservative	James Fortescue-Flannery	9,429	43.1	−4.7
Majority		3,005	13.8	+9.4
Turnout		21,863	80.8	+0.8
Registered electors		27,057		
Liberal hold		Swing	+4.7	

=== Elections in the 1910s ===
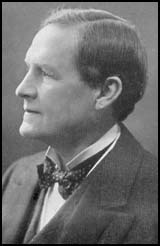
Thomas

General election January 1910: Cardiff Boroughs
Party	Candidate	Votes	%	±%
Liberal	D. A. Thomas	13,207	53.1	−3.8
Conservative	Ninian Crichton-Stuart	11,652	46.9	+3.8
Majority		1,555	6.2	−7.6
Turnout		24,859	86.5	+5.7
Liberal hold		Swing	-3.8	

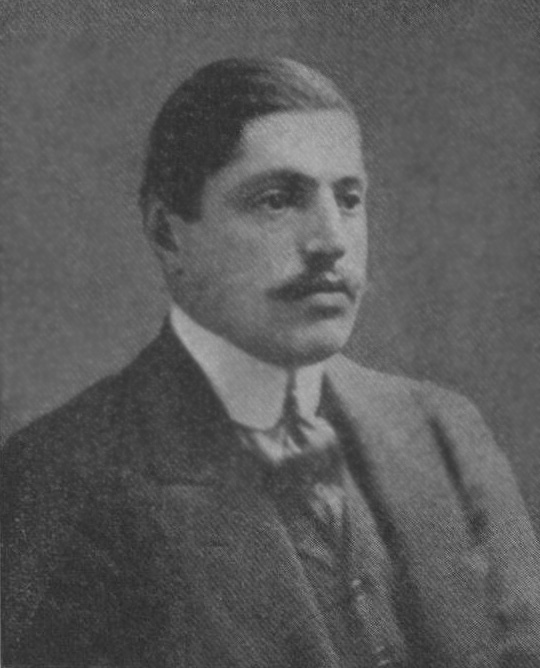
Crichton-Stuart

General election December 1910: Cardiff Boroughs
Party	Candidate	Votes	%	±%
Conservative	Ninian Crichton-Stuart	12,181	50.6	+3.7
Liberal	Clarendon Hyde	11,882	49.4	−3.7
Majority		299	1.2	N/A
Turnout		24,068	83.8	−2.7
Conservative gain from Liberal		Swing	+3.7	

1915 Cardiff by-election
Party	Candidate	Votes	%	±%
Unionist	James Cory	Unopposed		
Unionist hold				

== Bibliography ==
- Morgan, Kenneth O. (1960). "Democratic Politics in Glamorgan, 1884–1914". Morgannwg. 4: 5–27.
