= Ninian Stuart =

Hereditary Keeper of Falkland Palace (born 1957)

Ninian Crichton Stuart (born 16 March 1957) is the Hereditary Keeper of Falkland Palace, a former Scottish royal palace in Fife.

He is the grandson of Lt-Col Lord Ninian Edward Crichton-Stuart (15 May 1883 – 2 October 1915), the second son of John Crichton-Stuart, 3rd Marquess of Bute and the Honourable Gwendolen Mary Anne Fitzalan Howard, daughter of Edward Fitzalan-Howard, 1st Baron Howard of Glossop.

He is a cousin of John Crichton-Stuart, 7th Marquess of Bute (26 April 1958 – 22 March 2021), formerly known as 'Johnny Dumfries' while a racing driver. The latter won the 1988 24 Hours of Le Mans. The cousins both attended Ampleforth College, as is customary for male members of the Crichton-Stuart family.

He said, “Learning to work collectively, I turned away from top-down forms of hierarchy and immersed myself in more horizontal forms of community building - whilst discovering that good leaders both hold and distribute power (of purpose) and love (that includes everyone).”

He added: "Some families have been set apart with privileges over, and a duty to serve, others."

Stuart lives in Falkland and is a former Stewardship Director for the Falkland Heritage Trust. He is a co-founder of the Falkland Centre for Stewardship. It organized and ran the annual Big Tent festival that took place in July in Falkland.
