= Nicholas Hawkins (MP) =

Member of the Parliament of England

Nicholas Hawkins of Cardiff was a Welsh Member of Parliament. He represented Cardiff Boroughs in 1597.
