= Mansel family =

British noble family

Mansel Mansell, Maunsell
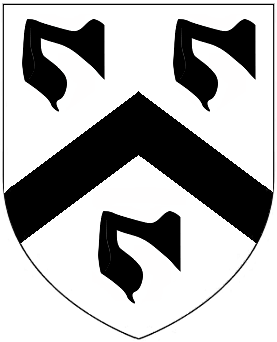
- Canting arms of Mansel: Argent, a chevron between three maunches sable
- Country: United Kingdom
- Origin: Normandy
- Titles: Baron Mansel of Margam; Baronet of Margam; Baronet of Muddlescombe; Baronet of Trimsaran
- Motto: Latin: Quod vult valde vult ("What he wishes, he wishes fervently")
- Estates: Current; Smedmore House; Former: Margam Castle; Oxwich Castle; Penrice Castle; St Donat's Castle; Iscoed Manor; Briton Ferry Estate; Sketty Hall; Cosgrove Hall

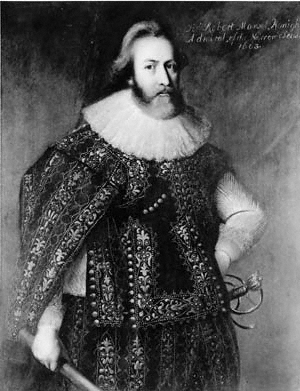
Portrait of Sir Robert Mansell

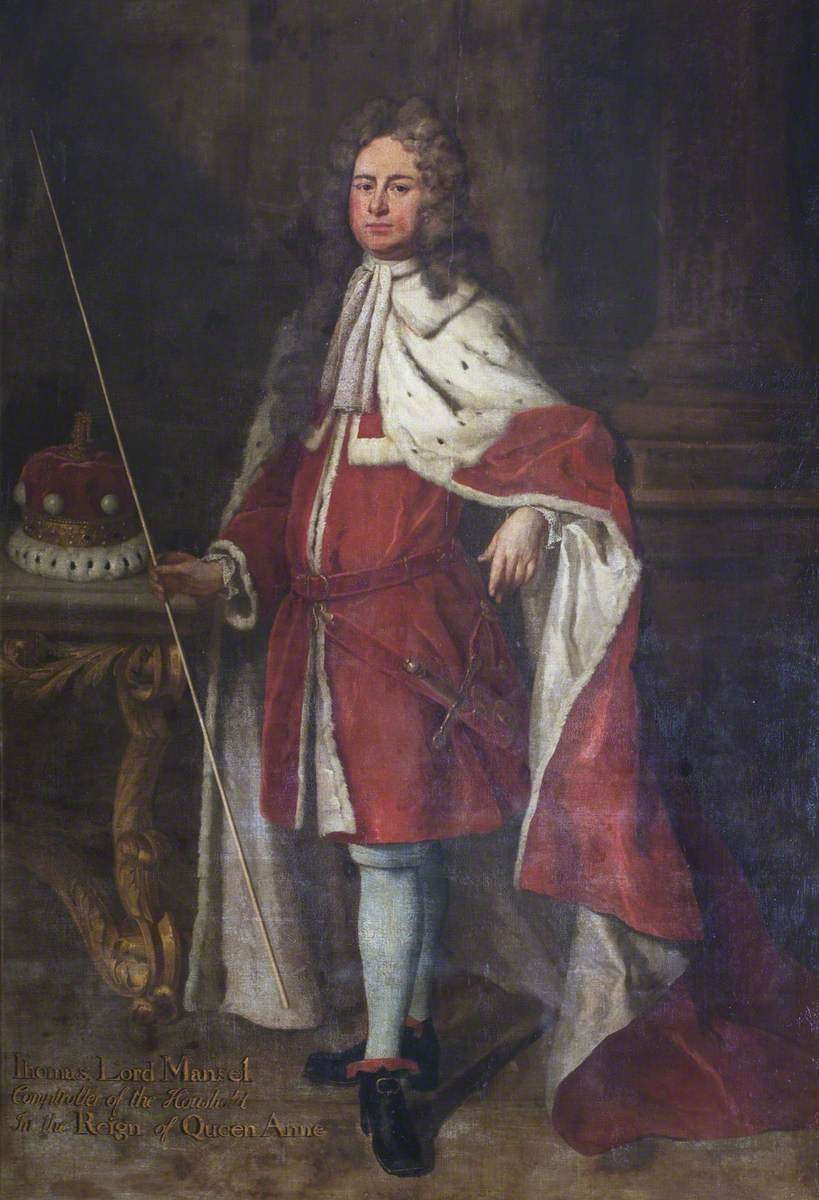
Portrait of Thomas Mansel, 1st Baron Mansel by Michael Dahl

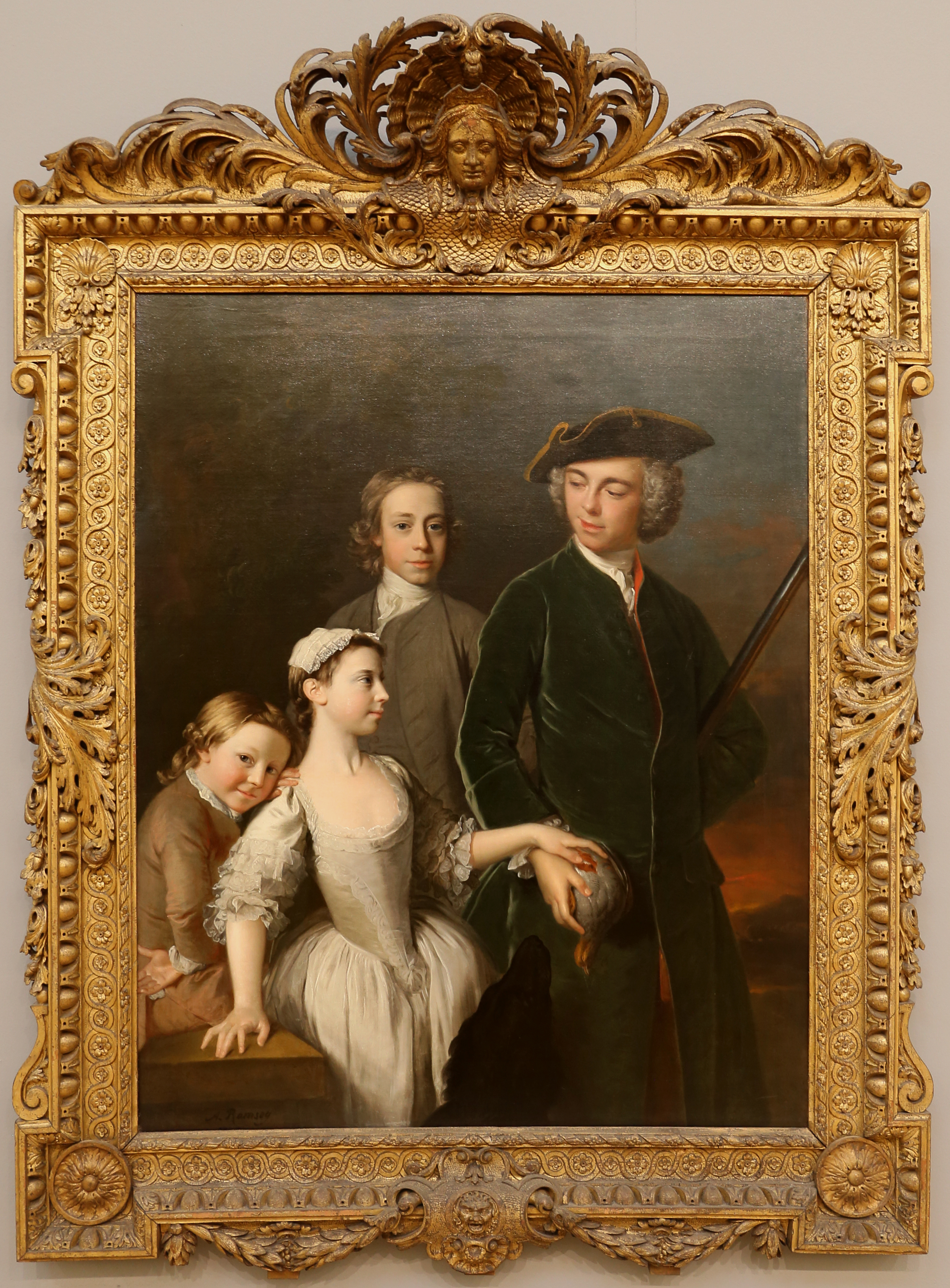
Thomas Mansel, 2nd Baron Mansel with his Blackwood half-brothers and sister by Allan Ramsay

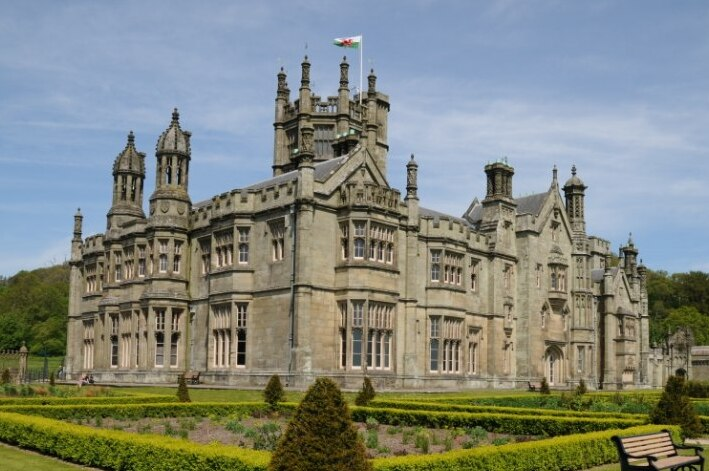
Margam Castle, built for Christopher Rice Mansel Talbot in 1830

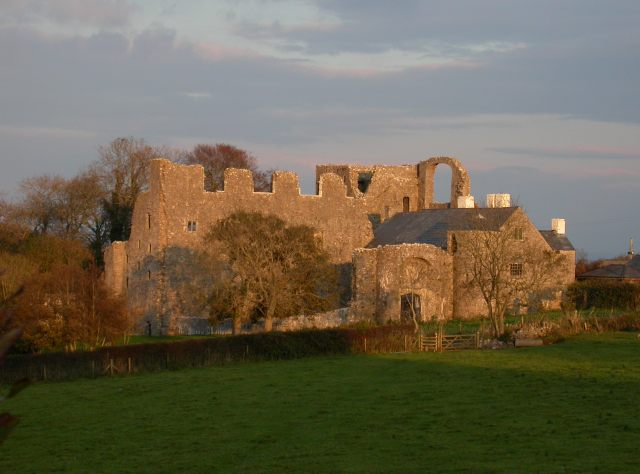
Oxwich Castle, built by Sir Rice Mansel

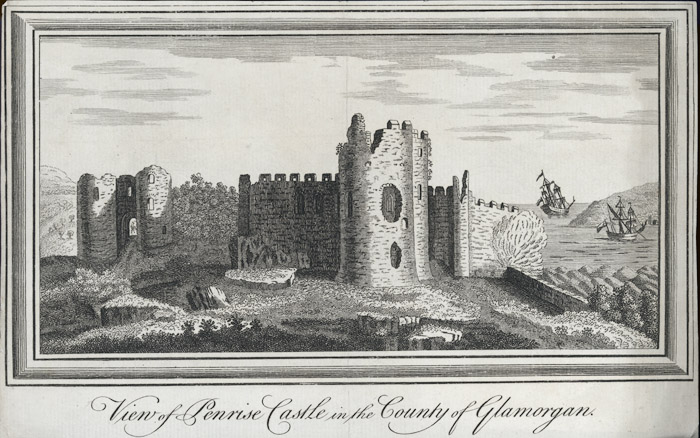
Penrice Castle, a 13th-century castle that passed to the Mansel family in 1410

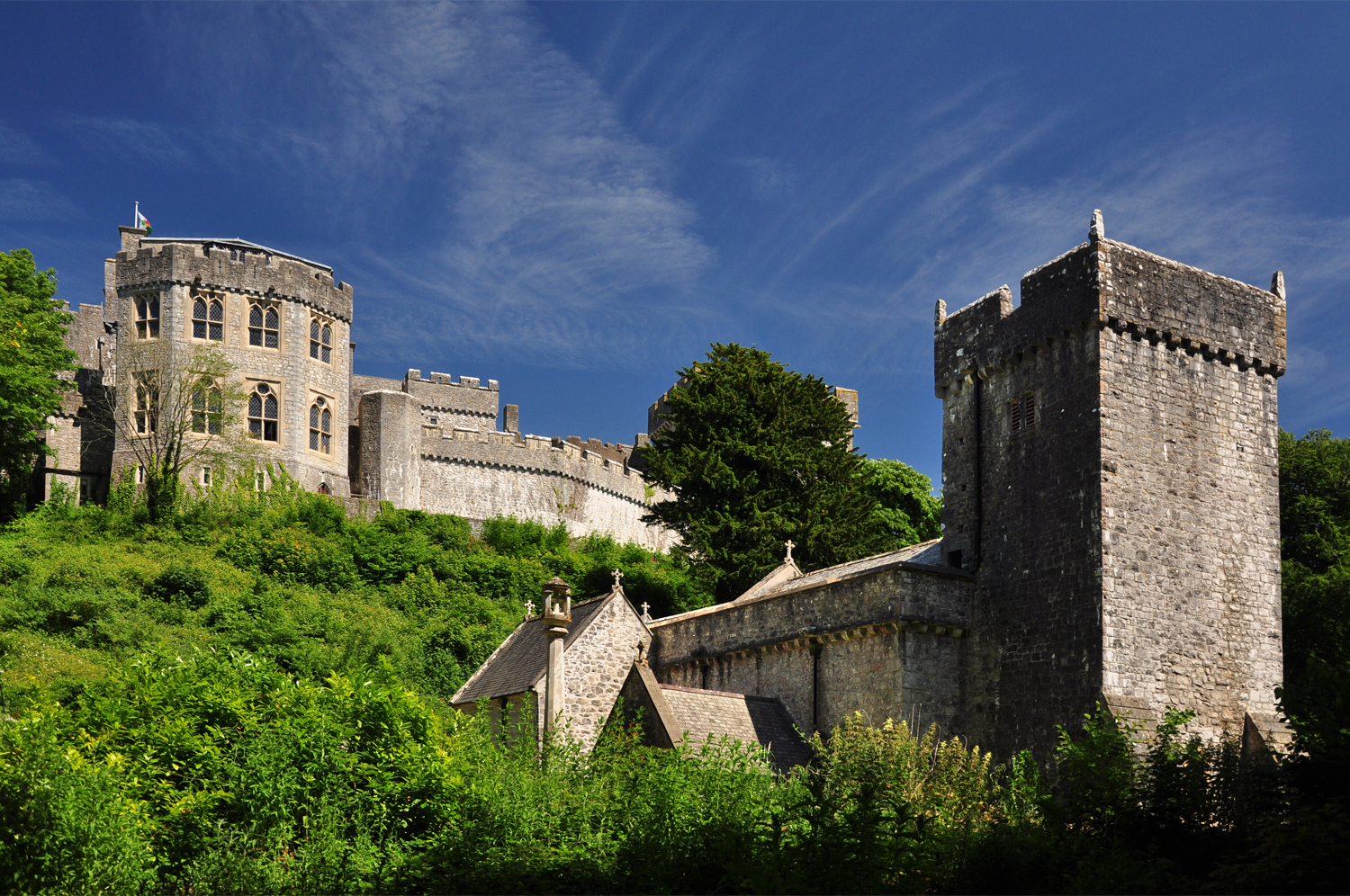
St Donat's Castle, given to Bussy Mansel, 4th Baron Mansel by his cousin Sir Thomas Stradling

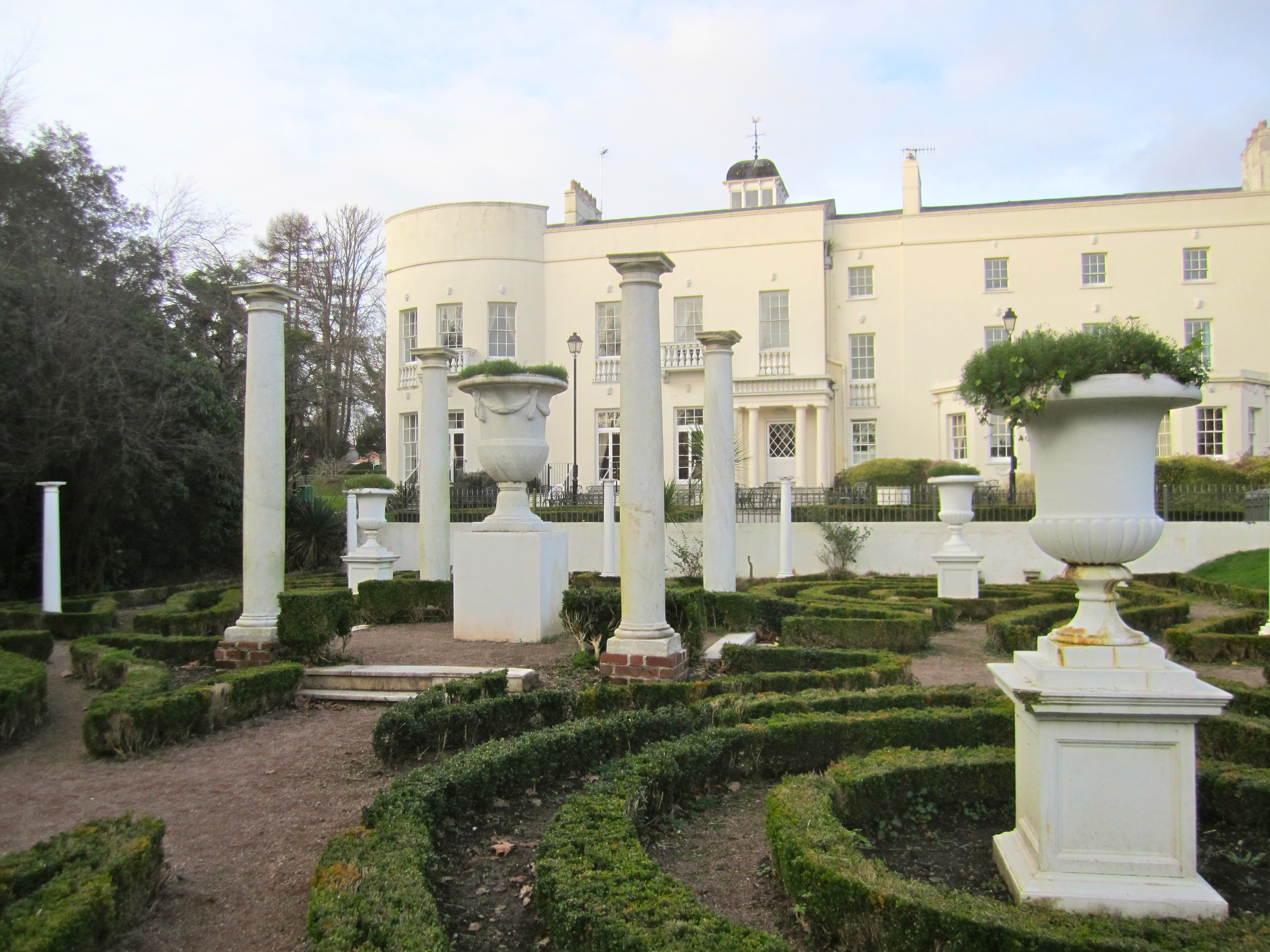
Sketty Hall, constructed in the 1720s by Rawleigh Mansel

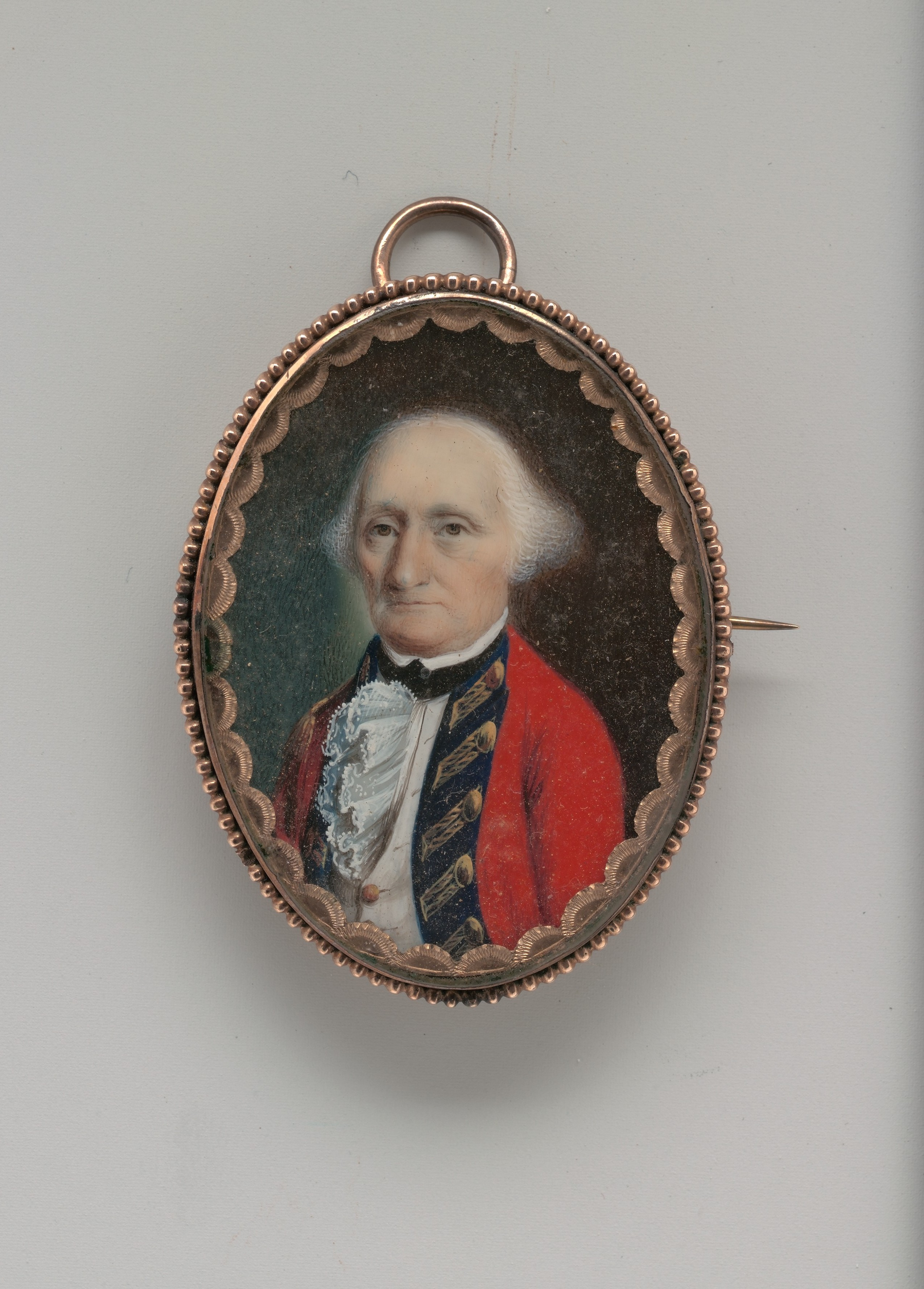
General John Maunsell of Barkestown, Co. Limerick

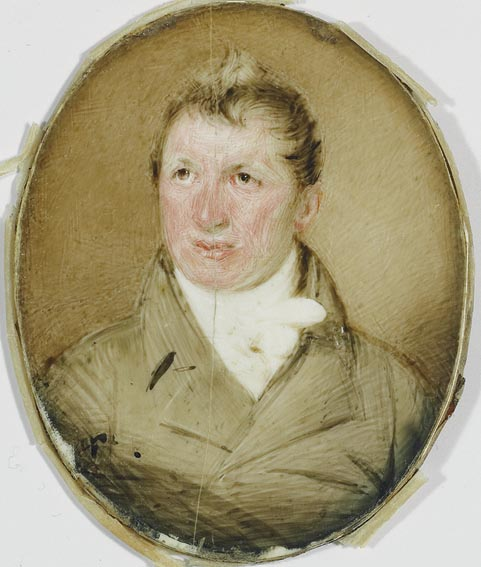
Portrait of Robert Maunsell by John Comerford

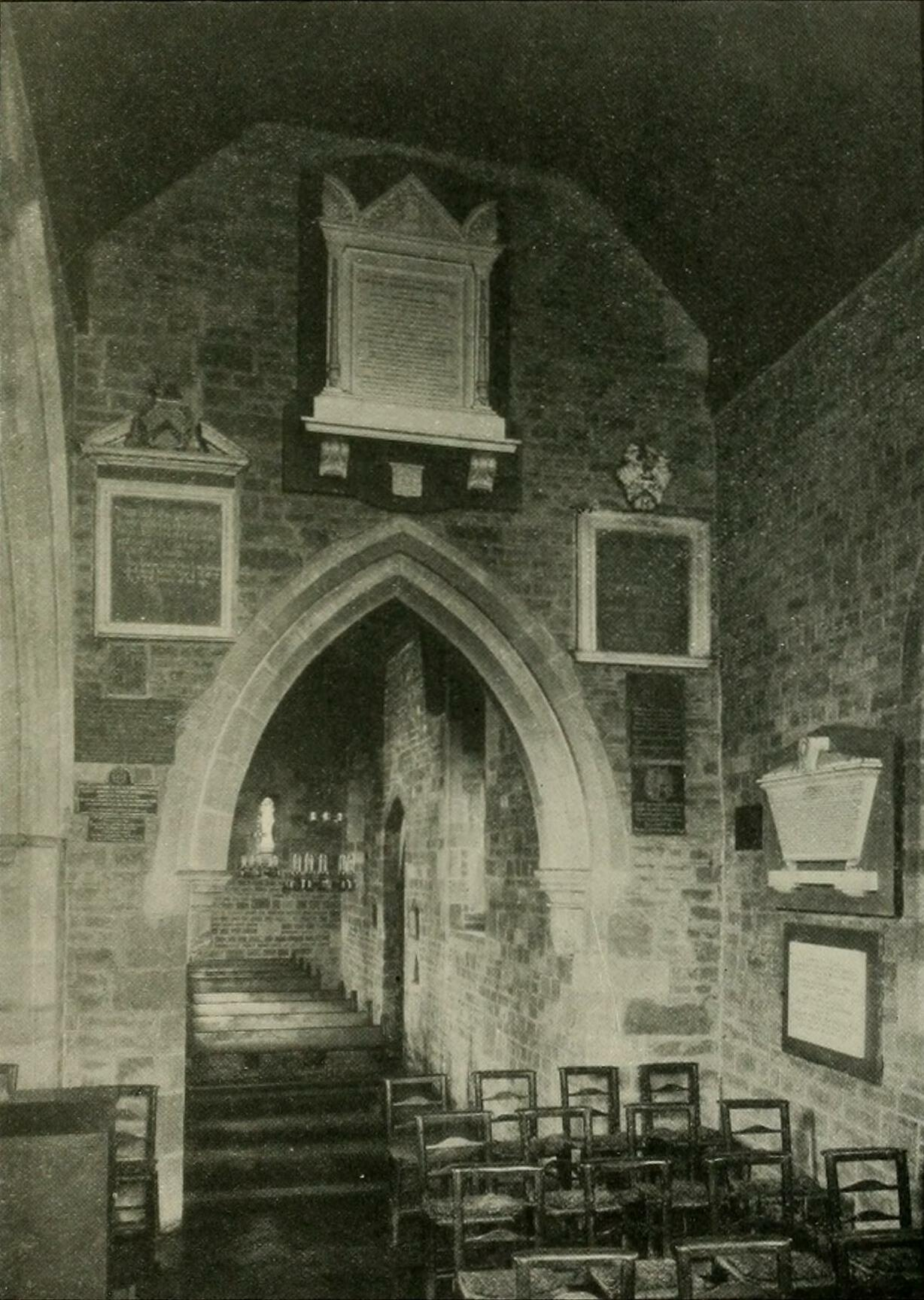
Church of St Leonard, Thorpe Malsor

The Mansel family (/mænsəl/, MAN-səl), also known throughout history as Mansell and Maunsell (Old French: Mansel, lit. 'someone from Le Mans, France'), is a British noble family.

== History ==
=== Origin ===
The Mansels came to England during the Norman Conquest and were established in Wales by the time of Henry I. Sir Robert Maunsel (born c. 1150) was a Templar under Baron Gilbert de Lacy in Palestine during the reign of Henry II. His father, Walter, a deacon, was Napkin Bearer to the King. Sir John Maunsell, grandson of Sir Robert, was lord Chancellor to Henry III and England's first secretary of state. He is listed in most Mansel genealogies as ancestor of the Lords Mansell of Margam, the Carmarthenshire Mansells, and the Maunsells of Ireland and Thorpe Malsor.

=== Baronets of Muddlescombe and Trimsaran ===
The Mansel Baronetcy of Muddlescombe, in the County of Carmarthen, was created in the Baronetage of England on 14 January 1622 for Sir Francis Mansel, younger brother of Sir Thomas Mansell, 1st Baronet of Margam. Sir William Mansel, 9th Baronet sat as Member of Parliament for Carmarthenshire. There was great confusion over the succession after the death of Sir John Bell William Mansel, 11th Baronet in 1883. The rightful heir was believed to be Edward Berkeley Philipps (later Mansel), son of Courtenay Philipps, son of Richard Mansel, younger brother of the tenth Baronet. However, it was widely believed that Courtenay Philipps's first marriage was invalid. The title was therefore assumed by Edward Berkeley Philipps's brother Richard Philipps (later Mansel) as the twelfth Baronet. On his death in 1892 the title was assumed by his son Courtenay Cecil Mansel, the thirteenth Baronet. However, in 1903 the latter discovered evidence that his grandfather's first marriage was indeed valid and relinquished the use of the title in favour of his uncle Edward Berkeley Philipps (later Mansel), who became the twelfth Baronet. When he died childless in 1908 the title was resumed by his nephew Courtenay Cecil Mansel, the thirteenth Baronet. Sir Courtenay Cecil Mansel later represented Penryn and Falmouth in the House of Commons. The Mansel Baronetcy of Muddlescombe is the only extant Mansel baronetcy as of the present day, with Sir Philip Mansel, 15th baronet (born 1943) having succeeded to the baronetcy on the death of his father, Sir John Philip Ferdinand Mansel, 14th baronet in 1947.

The Mansel Baronetcy of Trimsaran, in the County of Carmarthen, was created in the Baronetage of England on 22 February 1697 for Sir Edward Mansel, great-grandson of Sir Francis Mansel, 1st Baronet of Muddlescombe. The title became extinct on the death of the fourth baronet Sir Edward Joseph Shewen Mansel in 1798.

=== Barons Mansel of Margam ===
The title of Baron Mansel, of Margam in the County of Glamorgan, was created on 1 January 1712 for Sir Thomas Mansel, 5th Baronet, previously Member of Parliament for Cardiff and Glamorganshire. His great-grandfather Sir Thomas Mansell, 1st Baronet had been created a Baronet, of Margam in the County of Glamorgan, in the Baronetage of England on 22 May 1611. He held the office of High Sheriff of Glamorgan in 1593 and was twice elected as Member of Parliament for Glamorgan in 1597 and 1605. Sir Edward Mansel, 4th Baronet was also elected to the House of Commons representing Glamorgan.

Thomas Mansel, 1st Baron Mansel was succeeded by his grandson Thomas Mansel, son of Hon. Robert Mansel. Thomas Mansel, 2nd Baron Mansel died unmarried on 29 January 1744 and the title passed to Christopher Mansel, son of the first Baron, who also died unmarried. Bussy Mansel, third son of the first Baron, thus inherited the title.

Bussy Mansel, 4th Baron Mansel sat as Member of Parliament for Cardiff and Glamorganshire. He married Lady Elizabeth Hervey, the daughter of John Hervey, 1st Earl of Bristol and died without issue on 29 November 1750. On the death of the 4th baron, the barony and baronetcy became extinct and the Margam estates passed to his daughter Louisa, who married George Venables-Vernon, subsequently 2nd Baron Vernon. Following her death without issue in 1786, it passed to her aunt Mary Mansell, who had married John Ivory Talbot of Lacock Abbey, Wiltshire. However, other parts of the estates (subsequently known as the Briton Ferry estate) passed to her uncle Thomas Villiers, 1st Earl of Clarendon then to William Henry Augustus Villiers (who took the surname Mansell to inherit this estate). On his death without issue, it passed to his elder brother's son George Child Villiers, 5th Earl of Jersey.

=== Maunsells of Thorpe Malsor ===
In 1622, John Maunsell, Esq., of Chicheley, Buckinghamshire, a barrister, purchased from Lord Holland the rectory, manor, and estate of Thorpe Malsor, about two miles west from Kettering, Northamptonshire, in Rothwell Hundred. From that time, the main stock of the family continued to reside at Thorpe Malsor in affluence and distinction. John Maunsell died on 19 October 1625. He had two sons with Katherine Ward, daughter of Sir Richard Ward of Hurst.

== Pedigree ==
- Sir John Maunsell (c. 1190–1265)
  - Sir Thomas Maunsell
    - Henry Maunsell (born c. 1250)
      - Sir Walter Maunsell (died c. 1327)
        - Sir Robert Maunsell
          - Richard Maunsell
            - Sir Hugh Maunsell (born c. 1340)
              - Sir Richard Maunsell (c. 1375–1435)
                - John Maunsell
                  - Sir Philip Maunsell (1420–1471)
                    - Jenkin Mansel (1461–1510)
                      - Sir Rice Mansel (c. 1487–1559)
                        - Sir Edward Mansel (1531–1595)
                          - Sir Thomas Mansell, 1st Baronet (1556–1631)
                            - Sir Lewis Mansel, 2nd Baronet (c. 1594–1638)
                              - Sir Henry Mansel, 3rd Baronet (c. 1629–c. 1640)
                              - Sir Edward Mansel, 4th Baronet (1637–1706)
                                - Sir Thomas Mansel, 1st Baron Mansel (1667–1723)
                                  - Robert Mansel (1695–1723)
                                    - Thomas Mansel, 2nd Baron Mansel (1719–1744)
                                  - Sir Christopher Mansel, 3rd Baron Mansel (c. 1696–1744)
                                  - Bussy Mansel, 4th Baron Mansel (c. 1697–1750)
                          - Sir Francis Mansel, 1st Baronet (c. 1560–c. 1628)
                            - Francis Mansell (1579–1665)
                            - Sir Walter Mansel, 2nd Baronet (1586–1640)
                              - Sir Francis Mansel, 3rd Baronet (died 1650c. 1650)
                            - David (Lloyd) Mansel (1588-c. 1654)
                            - Sir Anthony Mansel (1588–1644)
                              - Sir Edward Mansel, 4th Baronet (died c. 1680)
                            - Richard Mansel (died c. 1635)
                              - Sir Richard Mansel, 5th Baronet (1641–1691)
                                - Sir Richard Mansel, 6th Baronet (died 1696)
                                - Sir William Mansel, 7th Baronet (1670–c. 1732)
                                  - Sir Richard Mansel, 8th Baronet (died 1749)
                                    - Sir William Mansel, 9th Baronet (1739–1804)
                                      - Sir William Mansel, 10th Baronet (1766–1829)
                                        - Sir John Bell William Mansel, 11th Baronet (1806–1883)
                                      - Richard Mansel (died 1844)
                                        - Courtenay Mansel (1801–1875)
                                          - Sir Richard Berkeley Mansel, 12th Baronet (1850–1892)
                                          - Sir Richard Mansel, 12th Baronet (1850–1892)
                                            - Sir Courtenay Cecil Mansel, 13th Baronet (1880–1933)
                                              - Sir John Philip Ferdinand Mansel, 14th Baronet (1910–1947)
                                                - Sir Philip Mansel, 15th Baronet (born 1943)
                                      - John Mansel (1776–1863)
                                        - George Pleydell Mansel (1817–1896)
                                          - John Delalynde Mansel (1850–1915)
                                            - Rhys Clavell Mansel (1891–1969)
                                              - John Clavell Mansel (1917–2007)
                                                - Philip Robert Rhys Mansel (born 1951)
                            - John Mansel (born 1611)
                              - Henry Mansel (died before 1683)
                                - Sir Edward Mansel, 1st Baronet (died 1720)
                                  - Sir Edward Mansel, 2nd Baronet (died 1754)
                                    - Sir Edward Vaughan Mansel, 3rd Baronet (died 1788)
                                      - Sir Edward Joseph Shewen Mansel, 4th Baronet (died 1798)
                          - Sir Robert Mansell (1573–1656)
                    - Richard Maunsell (died 1543)
                      - Richard Maunsell (died 1559)
                        - Thomas Maunsell (born 1536)
                          - Thomas Maunsell (born 1577)
                            - Thomas Maunsell (c. 1600–1686)
                              - Thomas Maunsell (died 1692)
                                - Richard Maunsell (died 1773)
                                  - Thomas Maunsell (c. 1705–c. 1773)
                                    - Robert Maunsell (1745–1832)
                                      - Frederick Maunsell (1793–1875)
                                        - Robert George Stone Maunsell (1842–1936)
                                          - Frederick Henry Robert Maunsell (1888–1957)
                                            - Henry Ian Geoffrey Maunsell (1924–2013)
                                              - John Henry Richard Maunsell (born 1955)
                                    - Dorothea Maunsell (c. 1750–1814) – m. Giusto Fernando Tenducci
                                  - Richard Maunsell (1721–1790)
                                    - Daniel Maunsell (1747–1824)
                                      - Daniel Henry Maunsell (1791–1834)
                                        - Sir Frederick Richard Maunsell (1828–1916)
                                          - Manuel Charles Maunsell (1866–1933)
                                            - Raymond John Maunsell (1903–1976)
                                      - Edward Charles Maunsell (1794–1857)
                                        - Edward Henry Maunsell (1837–1913)
                                          - Guy Anson Maunsell (1884–1961)
                                      - Robert Maunsell (1795–1875)
                                        - John Maunsell (1824–1899)
                                          - Richard Edward Lloyd Maunsell (1868–1944)
                                    - George Maunsell (1754–1834)
                                      - Robert Maunsell (1810–1894)
                            - John Maunsell (c. 1622–1695)
                              - Thomas Maunsell (died 1739)
                                - Thomas Maunsell (1704–1768)
                                  - William Maunsell (1729–1818)
                                    - Thomas Philip Maunsell (1781–1866)
                                    - Robert Charles Maunsell (1786–1845)
                                    - William Wray Maunsell (1782–1860)
                        - John Maunsell (1539–1605)
                          - Samuel Maunsell (born 1581)
                            - Edward Mansel (1627–1696)
                              - Christopher Mansel (1686–1741)
                                - John Mansel (1729–1794)
                                  - Henry Longueville Mansel (1783–1835)
                                    - Henry Longueville Mansel (1820–1871)

== Sources ==
- Addison, Charles Greenstreet (1842). The History of the Knights Templars, The Temple Church, and the Temple. London: Longman, Brown, Green, and Longmans.
- Various (13 September 1845). "Obituary of Eminent Persons, Recently Deceased. Captain Robert Maunsell, C.B." The Illustrated London News.
- Cokayne, George E (1900). Complete baronetage. Exeter : W. Pollard & co., ltd. – via Internet Archive.
- Maunsell, Robert George (1903). History of Maunsell, or Mansel, and of Crayford, Gabbett, Knoyle, Persse, Toler, Waller, Castletown; Waller, Prior Park; Warren, White, Winthrop, and Mansell of Guernsey. Cork: Guy and Company Limited. pp. 72, 85 (note), 179–80 (appendix 111).
- Maunsell, Charles Albert; Stratham, Edward Phillips (1917). History of the family of Maunsell (Mansell, Mansel). London, K. Paul – via Internet Archive.
- Davies, William Llewelyn (1959). "MANSEL family, of Oxwich, Penrice, and Margam abbey, Glamorganshire". Dictionary of Welsh Biography. National Library of Wales.
- "Mansell family of Margam" (2019). Cowbridge History Society Archive.
