= Mansel =

Mansel is a surname and a given name.

== Notable people ==
=== Surname ===
- Baron Mansel, a title that existed in Great Britain between 1712 and 1750, holders included:
  - Thomas Mansel, 1st Baron Mansel (c.1668–1723)
  - Bussy Mansel, 4th Baron Mansel (died 1750)
- Christopher Rice Mansel Talbot (1803–1890), Welsh landowner and industrialist
- Conwyn Mansel-Jones (1871–1942), British Army officer, recipient of the Victoria Cross during the Boer War
- Sir Courtenay Mansel (1880–1933), Welsh landowner, farmer, barrister, politician
- Sir Edward Mansel (1637–1706), Welsh politician
- Dean Henry Longueville Mansel (1820–1871), English philosopher
- James Mansel (1907–1995), English Anglican priest, chaplain to the Queen
- Jean Mansel (c.1400/1401–1473/1474), Medieval French historian
- Sir John Mansel (1190–1265), Secretary of State and Lord Chancellor to Henry III of England
- John Mansel (1729–1794), British Army cavalry general
- Lewis Mansel (died 1638), Welsh landowner
- Mildred Mansel (1868–1942), British suffragette
- Philip Mansel (born 1951), British author and historian
- Sir Rice Mansel (1487–1559), British politician
- Simon Mansel (between 1205 and 1220 – after 1268)
- William Lort Mansel (1753–1820), English Anglican priest, Bishop of Bristol

=== Given name ===
- Professor Sir Mansel Aylward, Welsh public health physician and academic
- Mansel Carter (1902–1987), American Businessman and prospector
- Mansel Longworth Dames (1850–1922), British orientalist
- Mansel Thomas (1909–1986), Welsh composer and conductor

== See also ==
- Mansel family
- Mansel baronets
- Mansel Island in Hudson Bay, Canada
- Mansel Lacy, a village and civil parish in Herefordshire, England
- Mansel Airport, a former airport 6 kilometres (4 mi) south-southwest of Paine, Chile
- Mansel, a character in the Fire Emblem: The Sacred Stones GBA video game
- Mansell, a surname
- Maunsell, a surname
