= Lewis Morgan =

Lewis Morgan may refer to:

- Lewis Morgan (footballer) (born 1996), Scottish footballer
- Lewis Morgan (rugby union), Welsh rugby union player
- Lewis Morgan (Welsh politician) (died 1635), Welsh politician
- Lewis H. Morgan (1818–1881), American ethnologist, anthropologist and writer
- Lewis L. Morgan (1876–1950), U.S. Representative from Louisiana
- Lewis Render Morgan (1913–2001), U.S. federal judge
- Lewis V. Morgan (1929–2018), American judge, lawyer, and politician

== See also ==
- Lew Morgan (1911–1988), Scottish footballer
- Llewellyn Morgan (1905–1979), Welsh footballer
- Morgan Lewis (disambiguation)
