= Thomas Mansel, 1st Baron Mansel =

British politician (1667–1723)

The Right Honourable The Lord Mansel
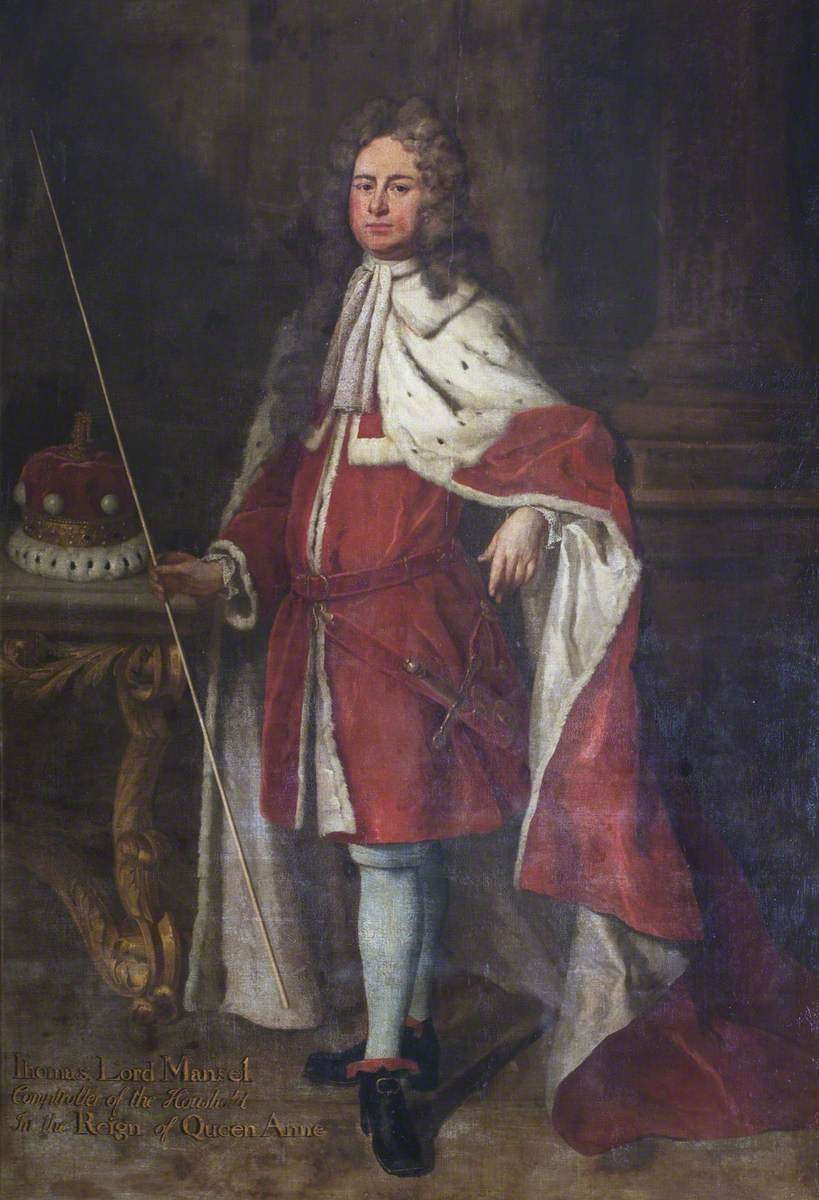
- Portrait by Michael Dahl, 1712–1723

Member of Parliament for Cardiff
- In office 1689–1698
- Preceded by: Francis Gwyn
- Succeeded by: Sir Edward Stradling

Member of Parliament for Glamorganshire
- In office 1699–1712
- Preceded by: Bussy Mansell
- Succeeded by: Robert Jones

Personal details
- Born: 9 November 1667
- Died: 10 December 1723 (aged 56)
- Party: Tories
- Education: Jesus College, Oxford (BA); New Inn Hall, Oxford (MA)

Thomas Mansel, 1st Baron Mansel PC (9 November 1667 – 10 December 1723) was a British Tory politician who sat in the English and British House of Commons from 1689 until 1712, when he was raised to the peerage as Baron Mansel as one of Harley's Dozen and sat in the House of Lords.

== Early life ==
Mansel was the second and first surviving son of Sir Edward Mansel, 4th Baronet, of Margam Abbey, Glamorgan, Wales, sometime Member of Parliament for Glamorganshire, and his wife Martha Carne. Mansel's great-grandfather was Henry Montagu, 1st Earl of Manchester. He received his BA in 1686 from Jesus College, Oxford and by 1699 he was awarded his MA from New Inn Hall, Oxford. On 18 May 1686 he married Martha Millington, daughter of Francis Millington, merchant, of London and Newick Place, Sussex.

== Political career ==
Mansel won the Welsh seat of Cardiff as a Tory MP in the 1689 Parliamentary election. Although he held the seat until 1698, it wasn't until he won the seat of Glamorgan in 1699 that he began to gain higher political offices. In 1701 he held the office of High Sheriff of Glamorgan. In 1714 he was appointed Comptroller of the Household to Queen Anne, a position he held until 1708. Whilst Comptroller of the Household, Mansel was invested as a Privy Council.

On the death of his father on 17 November 1706, he succeeded to the baronetcy and inherited a life interest in the Briton Ferry estate. On account of the death of his father, as well as the death of his cousin Thomas Mansel II, he was largely inactive in the period 1706 to 1707. From 1710 to 1711 he was a Commissioner of the Treasury. His interests were attracted by the South Sea Company and Royal African Company.

On 1 January 1712, he was raised to the peerage as Baron Mansel of Margam, and vacated his seat in the House of Commons to sit in the House of Lords. From 1712 to 1714, he was Teller of the Exchequer and from 1714 to 1715 he was Vice-Admiral of South Wales and Governor of Milford Haven. He also held the office of Chamberlain of South Wales from circa 1714. Mansel reduced his participation in politics in 1715, with a proxy attending Parliament in his stead.

== Death and legacy ==
Mansel died on 10 December 1723 and was buried at Margam. He and his wife had six children.

- Robert Mansel MP (1695–1723), who married Anne Shovell, daughter of Admiral of the Fleet Sir Cloudesley Shovell, and predeceased his father by a few months
- Mary Mansel (1697–1735), who married John Ivory-Talbot
- Christopher Mansel, 3rd Baron Mansel (died 1744)
- Bussy Mansel, 4th Baron Mansel (1701–1750), who married firstly Lady Elizabeth Hervey, daughter of John Hervey, 1st Earl of Bristol, and secondly Barbara Villiers, daughter of William Villiers, 2nd Earl of Jersey
- Martha Mansell

Known for his amorous exploits, Mansel was reputed to have had three illegitimate children by Mrs. Catherine Thomas of Margam.

== Ancestry ==
Ancestors of Thomas Mansel, 1st Baron Mansel

8. Sir Thomas Mansell, 1st Baronet
4. Sir Lewis Mansel, 2nd Baronet
9. Mary Mordaunt
2. Sir Edward Mansel, 4th Baronet
10. Henry Montagu, 1st Earl of Manchester
5. Lady Elizabeth Montagu
11. Catherine Spencer
1. Thomas Mansel, 1st Baron Mansel
12. Sir John Carne
6. Edward Carne
13. Blanch Morgan
3. Martha Carne
14. Sir Hugh Wyndham, 1st Baronet
7. Martha Wyndham
15. Mary Alanson

== Arms ==
Coat of arms of Thomas Mansel, 1st Baron Mansel
Coronet A Coronet of a Baron Escutcheon Argent on a chevron between three maunches sable Motto Honorantes me honorabo (I will honour those who honour me)

Parliament of England
Preceded by Francis Gwyn	Member of Parliament for Cardiff; 1689–1698	Succeeded by Sir Edward Stradling, Bt
Preceded by Bussy Mansel	Member of Parliament for Glamorganshire; 1699–1707	Succeeded by Parliament of Great Britain
Parliament of Great Britain
Preceded by Parliament of England	Member of Parliament for Glamorganshire; 1707–1712	Succeeded by Robert Jones
Political offices
Preceded by Sir Edward Seymour, Bt	Comptroller of the Household; 1704–1708	Succeeded by The Earl of Cholmondeley
Preceded by John Smith	Teller of the Exchequer; 1712–1714	Succeeded by John Smith
Honorary titles
Preceded by The Earl of Carbery	Vice-Admiral of South Wales; 1714–1715	Succeeded by Marquess of Winchester
Peerage of Great Britain
New creation	Baron Mansel; 1712–1723	Succeeded by Thomas Mansel
Baronetage of England
Preceded by Edward Mansel	Baronet (of Margam); 1706–1723	Succeeded by Thomas Mansel
