= Robert Jones (died 1715) =

Robert Jones (c. 1682 – 19 December 1715) of Fonmon, Glamorgan, Wales was a Welsh politician who sat in the House of Commons from 1712 to 1715.

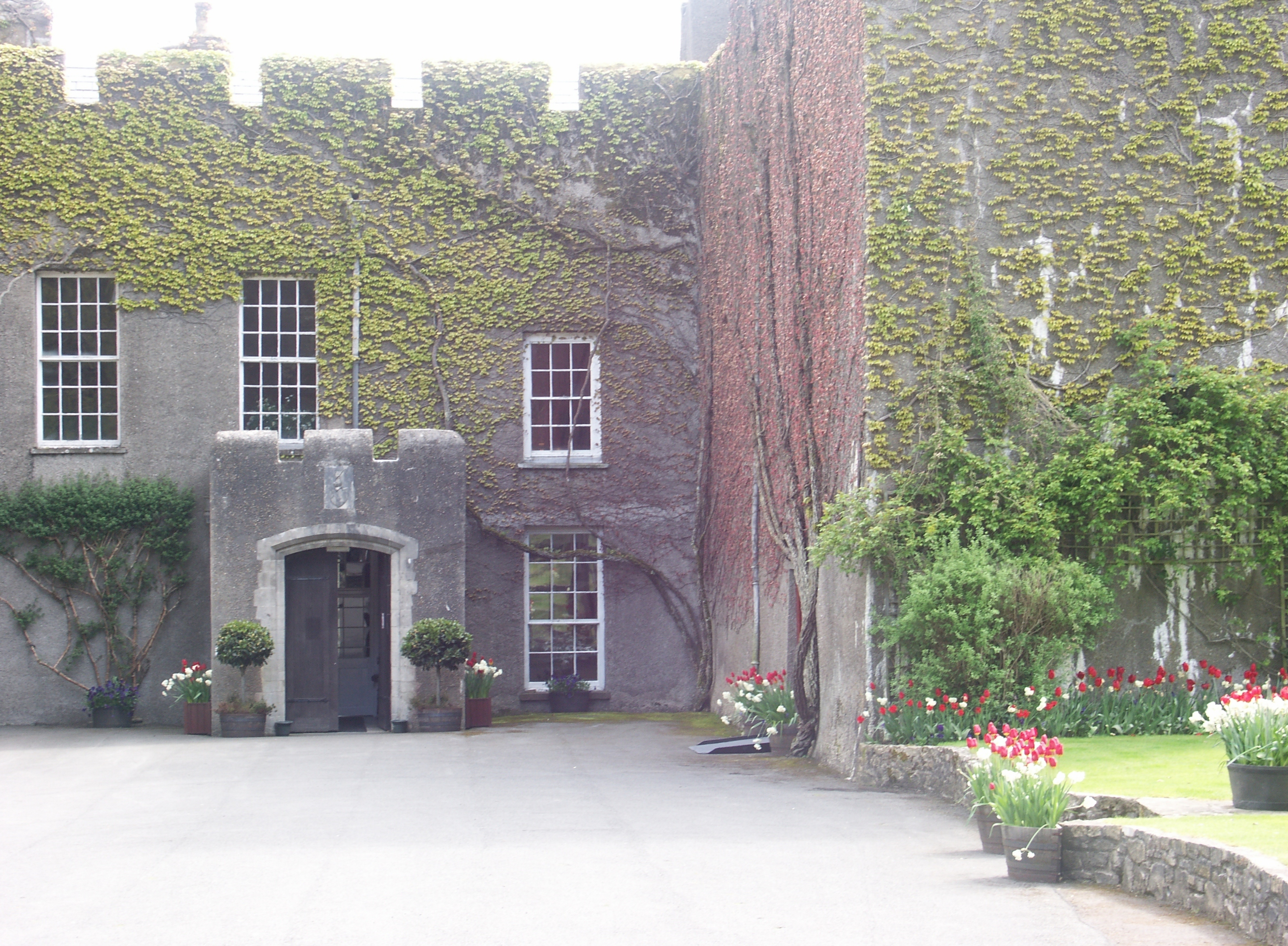
Fonmon House

Jones was a younger son of Oliver Jones (died 1685) of Fonmon Castle, and his wife Mary Button. His grandfather, Col. Philip Jones, had sat in Cromwell's Upper House. Robert was educated at Jesus College, Oxford, matriculating at 15 in 1698. He succeeded his elder brother Philip to Fonmon in 1686. In 1703, he married Mary Edwin, the daughter of Sir Humphrey Edwin, Mercer, alderman and Lord Mayor of London.

Jones replaced his father-in-law Sir Humphrey Edwin as High Sheriff of Glamorgan for the year 1703 to 1704. When Sir Thomas Mansel vacated his parliamentary seat at Glamorganshire on being ennobled as Baron Mansel, Jones was returned at a by-election on 13 January as Member of Parliament for Glamorganshire in the Mansel interest. He was a High Tory, while Mansel was a more moderate Court Tory, but Mansel may have felt obliged to make a concession to the local High Tory interests to prevent their attachment to the Duke of Beaufort's interest. He was again returned for Glamorgan at the 1715 election, and was noted as a Jacobite, keeping a portrait of the Pretender.

Jones did not long survive the Whig reascendancy as he died on 19 December 1715 at the age of 33. He left two sons and four daughters.

Parliament of Great Britain
| Preceded by Sir Thomas Mansel | Member of Parliament for Glamorganshire; 1712–1715 | Succeeded by Sir Charles Kemeys |
Honorary titles
| Preceded by Sir Humphrey Edwin | High Sheriff of Glamorgan; 1703–1704 | Succeeded by Thomas Thomas |
