= Mansell =

Mansell is a surname. Notable people with the surname include:

- Clint Mansell (born 1963), British musician and composer
- Chris Mansell (born 1953), Australian poet
- Christian Mansell (born 2005), Australian racing driver
- Francis Mansell (1579–1665), Principal of Jesus College, Oxford
- Gerard Mansell (1921–2010), Managing Director of External Broadcasting and Deputy Director-General of the BBC
- Greg Mansell (born 1987), British racing driver
- Henry J. Mansell (1937–2026), American Roman Catholic archbishop
- Jessica Mansell (born 1989), Australian netball player
- Lee Mansell (born 1982), British footballer
- Leo Mansell (born 1985), British racing driver
- Michael Mansell (born 1951), Tasmanian (Australian) Aboriginal activist and lawyer
- Mickey Mansell (born 1973), darts player from Northern Ireland
- Mike Mansell (1858–1902), American baseball player
- Nigel Mansell (born 1953), British racing driver
- Peter Mansell, bassist for English rock band Pulp
- Percy Mansell (1920–1995), South African cricketer
- Richard Mansell (1813–1904), British railway engineer
- Sir Robert Mansell (1573–1656), Royal Navy admiral and British member of parliament
- Scott Mansell (born 1985), British racing driver

== Other uses ==
- Mansell Street, London
- Mansell wheel, railway wheel invented by Richard Mansell

== See also ==
- Mansel, surname
- Maunsell, surname
