= Edmund Thomas (Parliamentarian) =

Welsh politician (1633–1677)

Edmund Thomas (1633–1677) was a Welsh politician who sat in the House of Commons in 1654 and 1656 and sat in Cromwell's Upper House. He supported the Parliamentary cause during the English Civil War and the Interregnum.

== Biography ==
In 1654, Thomas was elected Member of Parliament for Glamorgan in the First Protectorate Parliament. He was re-elected MP for Glamorgan in 1656 for the Second Protectorate Parliament. On 10 December 1657, Thomas became one of three Welsh men, who were made members of Oliver Cromwell's House of Lord, the other two were Philip Jones and John Jones of Merionethshire. Thomas had extensive family connections with General Edmund Ludlow, and the brothers William Strickland and Walter Strickland, all three of whom were also members of Cromwell's Upper House. He also attended Cromwell's funeral. In 1659 he was put in command of Militia in Glamorgan, Brecon and Radnor. He purchased lands in Wenvoe, St Andrews, Llandow, Rhiwperra and Michaelston-y Vedw. In 1664 he was High Sheriff of Glamorgan.

Thomas died in 1677 and was buried at Wenvoe.

== Family ==
Thomas came from a family that was for many years seated at Wenvoe. The original male line was named (ap) Harpwaye, of Tresimont. Harpwaye of Tresimont may be a variation of (ap) Harpway of Tresimwn/Tre Simon/Bonvilston. The Harpwayes were an old family of Herefordshire. The family adopted the name of Thomas, as a result of a marriage with Catherine, daughter and sole heir of Thomas ap Thomas, of Wenvoe Castle. Edmund Thomas was the only son of William Thomas and Jane Stradling, daughter of Sir John Stradling, 1st Baronet. Edmund Thomas married firstly Elizabeth Morgan, daughter of Sir Lewis Morgan of Ruperra Castle and sister of Thomas Morgan. He married secondly Mary Lewis, daughter of Sir Thomas Lewis of Penmark Place at Wenvoe on 1 August 1671. Their son and heir William Thomas married Mary, the daughter of Philip, Lord Wharton with whom he had two children, Edmund and Anna. On William Thomas's death in 1677, his wife Mary inherited the estates of Wenvoe and Ruperra. Their two children, both died prematurely and on Mary's death, in 1699, the estates passed to her sister-in-law Elizabeth, Edmund Thomas's elder sister whose first marriage was to Edmund Ludlow. On Ludlow'a death, Wenvoe and Ruperra were returned to the Thomas family when Elizabeth married secondly, her distant cousin Sir John Thomas, 1st Baronet.

== See also ==
- Thomas Baronetcy, of Wenvoe

== Notes ==
Parliament of England
Preceded by Not represented in Barebones Parliament	Member of Parliament for Glamorgan; 1654–1656; With: Philip Jones	Succeeded by Evan Seys
