= Robert Mansel =

Robert Mansel may refer to:

- Sir Robert Mansell (1573–1656), admiral of the English Royal Navy and member of parliament
- Robert Mansel (constable) (c. 1175 – after March 1219), constable of Antioch
- Reginald Baynes Mansell, Air Vice Marshal of the Royal Air Force in World War II
- Robert Christopher Mansel (1789–1864), British Army officer
- Robert Mansel, known professionally as Black Noi$e, American record producer, songwriter, and DJ

== See also ==
- Robert Maunsell (disambiguation)
