= Robert Maunsell =

Robert Maunsell may refer to:

- Robert Maunsell (missionary) (1810–1894), English missionary, linguist and translator in New Zealand
- Robert Mansell (1573–1656), admiral of the English Royal Navy and member of parliament
- Robert Maunsell (Royal Navy officer) (1785/6–1845), Royal Navy officer, made post-captain in 1812

== See also ==
- Maunsell
