= Richard Mansel Philipps =

Royal Navy officer & politician (1768–1844)

Richard Mansel Philipps (1768–1844), originally Richard Mansel, was a British Royal Navy officer and politician, Member of Parliament for Stafford from 1806 to 1812.

== Life ==
He was the second son of Sir William Mansel, 9th Baronet of Iscoed, Member of Parliament (MP) for Carmarthenshire, and his wife Mary Philipps, sister of George Philipps, also a Carmarthenshire MP. The Coedgain estate, four miles outside Carmarthen on the Swansea road, came to him in 1792; it had been left first by George Philipps, who died in 1781, to a cousin Richard Philipps (died 1792). Mansel added Philipps to his name in 1793. He was an improving farmer of the estate.

== Royal Navy ==
In the early 1790s, Mansel Philipps was a lieutenant in the navy, appointed in 1790. His father hoped to influence Prime Minister William Pitt by mentioning his service on the outbreak of the French Revolutionary Wars, as first lieutenant under William Clement Finch on HMS Excellent. He was later with the Sea Fencibles.

== In politics ==
In 1797, at the Crown and Anchor Tavern in London, Mansel Philipps met parliamentary reformers. He also joined the Whig Club of England, founded at this time, in the same venue.

Well before the 1802 general election, at the end of 1801, Mansel Philipps began canvassing for support in Carmarthenshire. He apparently had the backing of John Vaughan, Lord Lieutenant of Carmarthenshire. When Vaughan switched his approval to William Paxton, Mansel Philipps, who did not have his father's blessing, withdrew before the poll. He launched election petitions against both Paxton and the victor James Hamlyn Williams, to no avail.

Mansel Philipps found political success by moving off his home ground. The withdrawal in 1806 of Richard Brinsley Sheridan from Stafford gave an opportunity seen by Henry Clifford, from a Catholic family. His brother Thomas Clifford had an estate at Tixall, a few miles east of Stafford. Ahead of the 1806 general election, the Cliffords supported Mansel Philipps in early canvassing for the Whig vote. Richard's son Thomas Sheridan had expected to succeed his father, but had a slow start to his campaign. Mansel Philipps topped the poll in the two-member constituency, ahead of Edward Monckton. This was despite Richard Sheridan trying to exploit his extensive debts.

The 1807 general election became necessary because the King could not countenance Catholic relief. Mansel Philipps was re-elected, but had to find further election expenses when he was burdened with financial difficulties arising from his Welsh collieries. He supported some measures related to Catholic relief in 1808. From 1809 he was on the defensive after taking money from a constituent and dishonestly using it to pay down debts; he used John Ingram Lockhart to duck a summons to the House. He dropped out of public life in 1812.

== Family ==
Mansel Philipps married in 1797, Caroline Hopkins, daughter of Benjamin Bond Hopkins MP (died 1794) of Painshill Park, who had inherited wealth from John Hopkins. The couple had two sons and one daughter. The elder son Richard and daughter Frances Matilda died young.

The younger son Courtenay Mansel Philipps (1801–1875) was a major in the 15th Hussars. He changed his name to Courtenay Mansel in 1866, by royal licence. After his death, his sons became significant in the line of the Mansel baronets of Muddlescombe (1622).

Philipps made a Scottish marriage c.1838 to Eliza Sidney, daughter of the Rev. John Sidney. The Court of Session in 1906 decreed that this marriage was valid. His second son Richard Mansel-Mansel in 1877 made a court application under the Legitimacy Declaration Act 1858, asking that the legitimate heirs be declared on the basis that a second marriage ceremony that took place between Courtenay and Eliza in 1847, at the old St Paul's Church, Liverpool, was the first valid marriage. This declaration would have ruled out the eldest son Edward Berkeley Mansel as heir to his father; the court, however, took the view that the requested declaration was ultra vires, in that under the act legitimacy of birth did not extend to the question of legitimacy as heir.

At issue was the succession to Sir John Bell William Mansel, 11th Baronet. Joseph Foster's reference work in 1883 gave Richard Mansel-Mansel as the heir presumptive. In that year the 11th Baronet died, and Richard Mansel-Mansel was widely recognised as the 12th Baronet. His son Courtenay was later recognised as the 13th Baronet. The accepted succession underwent a change in 1903 when Edward Berkeley Mansel's claim was recognised. He died in 1908, when the title reverted to Courtenay.
