= Morgan Lewis =

Morgan Lewis may refer to:

- Morgan Lewis (basketball), American basketball player
- Morgan Lewis (governor), Governor of New York State and US Army general
- Morgan Lewis (songwriter)
- Morganics, hip hop artist Morgan Lewis

== See also ==
- Morgan, Lewis & Bockius, law firm
- Lewis Morgan (disambiguation)
