= Sir Edward Stradling, 5th Baronet =

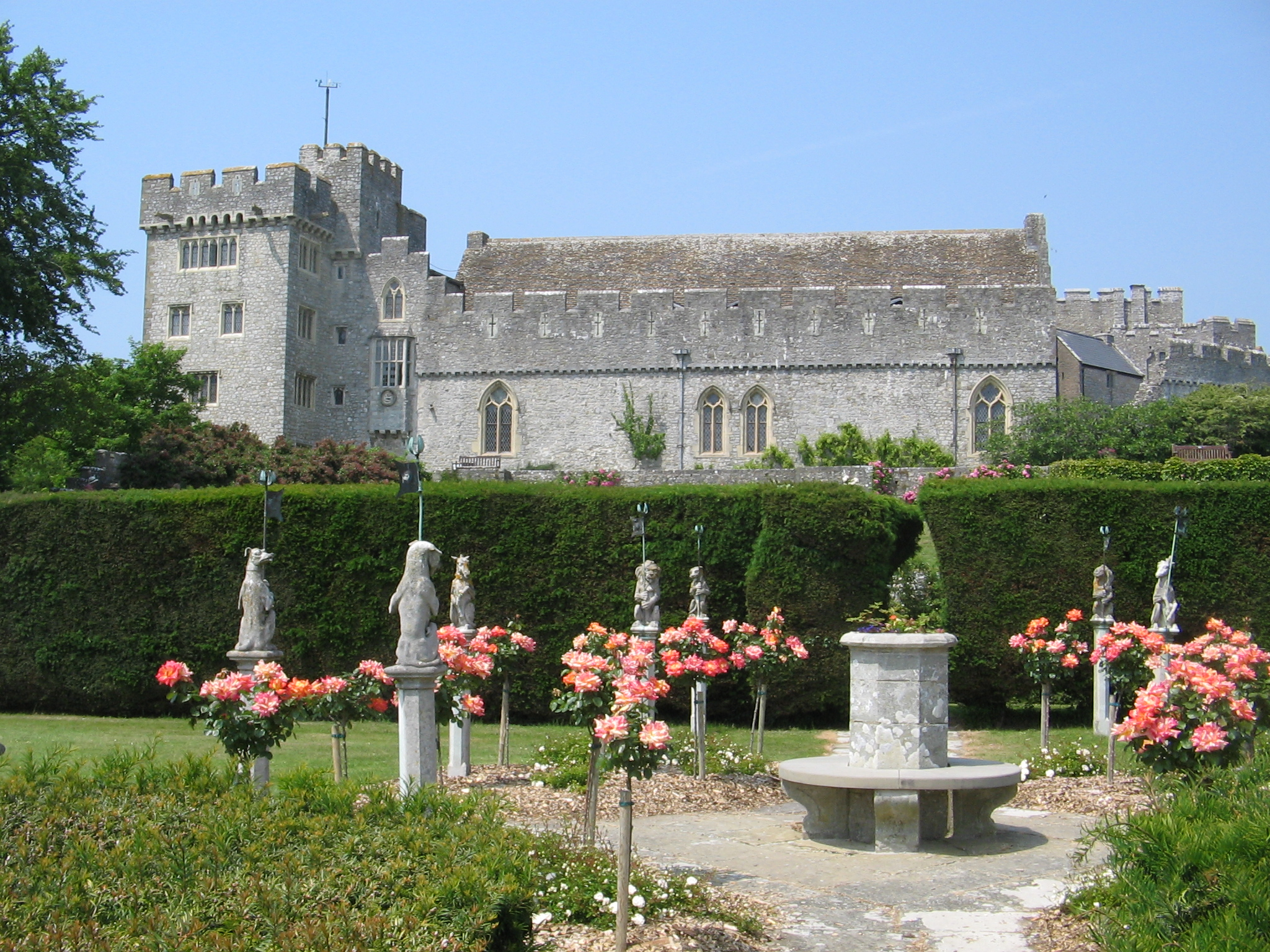
St Donat's Castle, the seat of the Stradlings

Sir Edward Stradling, 5th Baronet (11 April 1672 – 5 April 1735) was a Welsh landowner and politician and a baronet in the peerage of England.

He was the eldest surviving son of Sir Edward Stradling, 4th Baronet of St Donat's Castle, Glamorganshire and educated at Christ Church, Oxford. He succeeded his father in 1685.

== Career ==
Stradling was Member of Parliament for Cardiff, 1698, 1700–01, 1710–22, and Sheriff of Glamorgan, 1709–10.

He died in 1735, having married Elizabeth, the daughter of Sir Edward Mansel, 4th Baronet, M.P., of Margam, Glamorganshire, with whom he had two sons. The elder son, Edward, predeceased him in 1726, and the younger son and heir, Sir Thomas, who died in mysterious circumstances in Montpelier (France) in 1738, was the last Stradling of St Donat's.

As a result of an understanding between Thomas Stradling and his friend Sir John Tyrwhitt, whereby each promised the other his inheritance in the event of his death, St Donat's passed to the Tyrwhitts.

Parliament of England
Preceded by Thomas Mansel	Member of Parliament for Cardiff Boroughs; 1698 – 1701	Succeeded by Thomas Mansel
Parliament of Great Britain
Preceded by Sir John Aubrey, Bt	Member of Parliament for Cardiff Boroughs; 1710 – 1722	Succeeded by Edward Stradling
Baronetage of England
Preceded by Edward Stradling	Baronet (of St Donats); 1635–1735	Succeeded by Thomas Stradling
