= Edward Stradling (1699–1726) =

Edward Stradling (30 March 1699 – 3 October 1726) was a Welsh politician.

The oldest son of Sir Edward Stradling, 5th Baronet (1672–1735), he was educated at Christ Church, Oxford. In 1722, he was elected to the House of Commons of Great Britain as the Member of Parliament (MP) for Cardiff Boroughs, succeeding his father. He died in office in 1726, aged 27.

Parliament of Great Britain
Preceded by Sir Edward Stradling, Bt	Member of Parliament for Cardiff Boroughs; 1722 – 1726	Succeeded by Bussy Mansel
