= William Price (of Briton Ferry) =

Welsh politician

William Price was a Welsh politician who sat in the House of Commons between 1614 and 1626.

Price was the eldest son of Lleisan Price of Briton Ferry, who had been MP for Cardiff, and his wife Maud Evans daughter of D Evans of Gnoll. In 1614, he was elected Member of Parliament for Old Sarum. He was elected MP for Glamorgan in 1621 and was elected MP for Cardiff in 1624, 1625 and 1626. He was under sheriff of Glamorgan in 1626.

Price married Catherine Thomas daughter of David Popkin Thomas of Ynis Forgan.

Parliament of England
Preceded by William Ravenscroft; Edward Leech	Member of Parliament for Old Sarum; 1614	Succeeded by George Myne; Thomas Brett
Preceded by Sir Thomas Mansell, 1st Baronet	Member of Parliament for Glamorgan; 1621–1622	Succeeded by Sir Robert Mansell
Preceded by William Herbert	Member of Parliament for Cardiff; 1624–1626	Succeeded by Lewis Morgan
