= Mansel baronets of Muddlescombe (1622) =

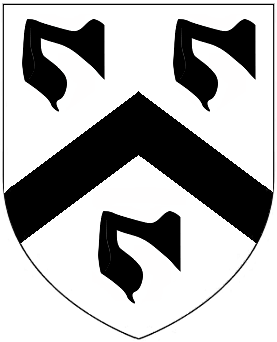
Escutcheon of the Mansel baronets of Muddlescombe

The Mansel baronetcy of Muddlescombe, Kidwelly, in the County of Carmarthen, was created in the Baronetage of England on 14 January 1622 for Francis Mansel. He was the younger brother of the 1st Baronet of the first creation. The 9th Baronet sat as Member of Parliament for Carmarthenshire.

Cokayne comments that the pedigree to the 5th Baronet is obscure. Burke's Peerage (1903) omits two, so that the MP Sir William Mansel is given as the 7th Baronet.

== Mansel baronets, of Muddlescombe (1622) ==
- Sir Francis Mansel, 1st Baronet (died c. 1628)
- Sir Walter Mansel, 2nd Baronet (c.1588–1640)
- Sir Francis Mansel, 3rd Baronet (died c. 1650)
- Sir Edward Mansel, 4th Baronet (died c. 1680)
- Sir Richard Mansel, 5th Baronet (1641–1691)
- Sir Richard Mansel, 6th Baronet (died c. 1700)
- Sir William Mansel, 7th Baronet (1670-c.1732)
- Sir Richard Mansel, 8th Baronet (died 1749)
- Sir William Mansel, 9th Baronet (1739–1804)
- Sir William Mansel, 10th Baronet (1766–1829)
- Sir John Bell William Mansel, 11th Baronet (1806–1883)

- Sir Richard Mansel, soi-disant 12th Baronet (1850–1892) (assumed title in 1883)
- Sir Courtenay Cecil Mansel, soi-disant 13th Baronet (1880–1933) (assumed title in 1892; relinquished title in 1903)

- Sir Edward Berkeley Mansel, 12th Baronet (1839–1908) (assumed title in 1903)
- Sir Courtenay Cecil Mansel, 13th Baronet (1880–1933) (resumed title in 1908)
- Sir John Philip Ferdinand Mansel, 14th Baronet (1910–1947)
- Sir Philip Mansel, 15th Baronet (born 1943)

The heir apparent is the eldest son of the 15th baronet, John Philip Mansel (born 1982).

There was confusion over the succession after the death of the 11th Baronet in 1883. For details see Richard Mansel Philipps#Family.
