= Philip Jones of Fonmon =

Welsh military leader and politician (c.1617–1674)

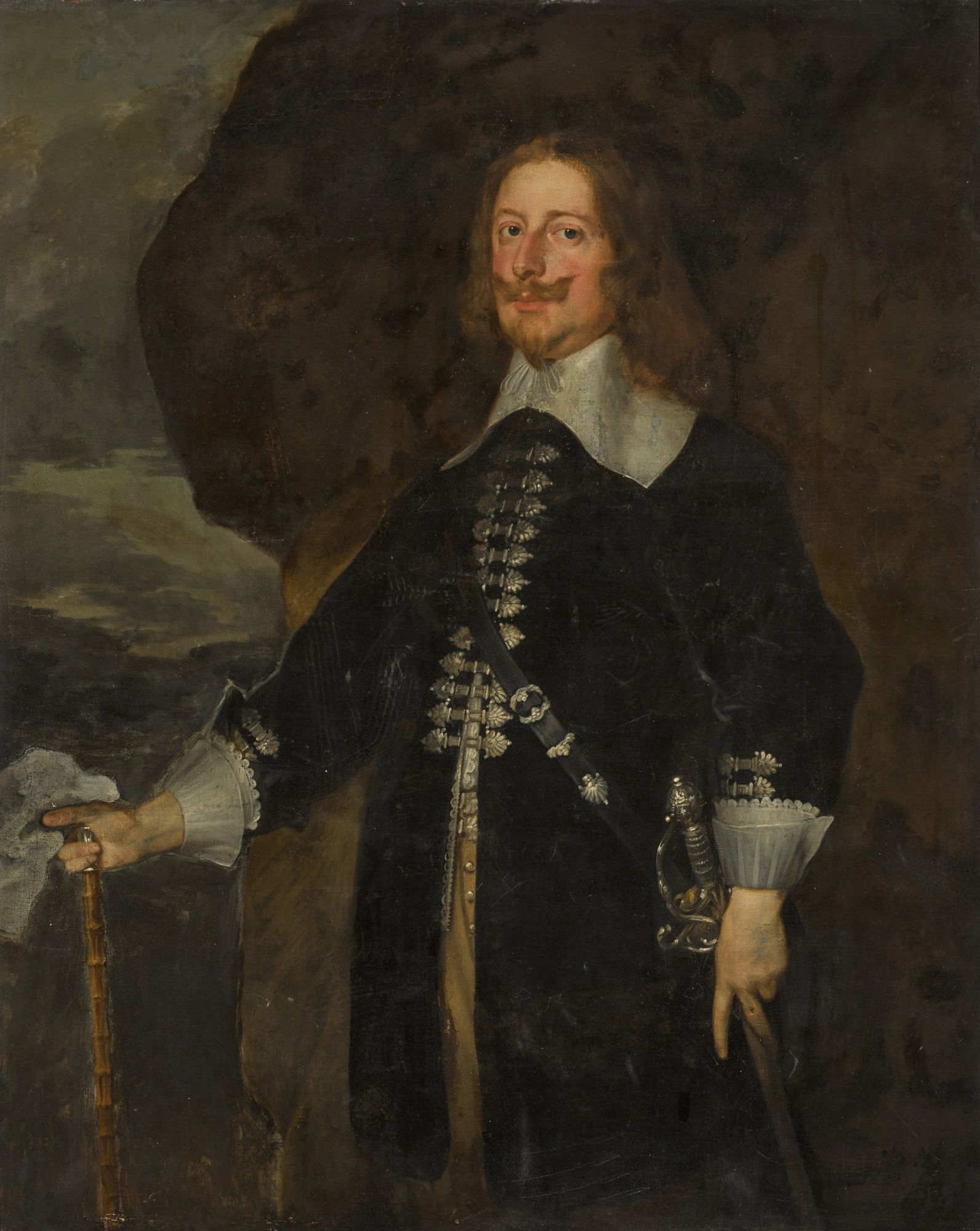
- Born: c. 1617; Swansea
- Died: 5 September 1674
- Spouse(s): Jane Price
- Position held: High Sheriff of Glamorgan (1672–)

Colonel Philip Jones (c. 1617 – 5 September 1674) was a Welsh military leader and politician who sat in the House of Commons between 1650 and 1656. He rose to the rank of Colonel in the service of the Parliamentary Army under Fairfax during the English Civil War. As Governor of Swansea he successfully held the town against the Royalist forces.

== Biography ==
Jones was born at the Great House Swansea, the son of David Johns of Swansea and Penywaun Llangyfelach. He became Parliamentarian governor of Swansea on 17 November 1645 and was governor of Cardiff by 1649. In 1646, he was a colonel in the Parliamentary army.

In 1650, Jones was elected Member of Parliament for Breconshire in the Rump Parliament and sat until 1653. He was a member of the Council of State and was nominated as representative for Monmouthshire in the Barebones Parliament. In 1654, he was elected MP for Monmouthshire and Glamorgan and chose to sit for Glamorgan. In 1656, he was elected MP for Glamorgan and Breconshire, and chose to sit for Glamorgan.

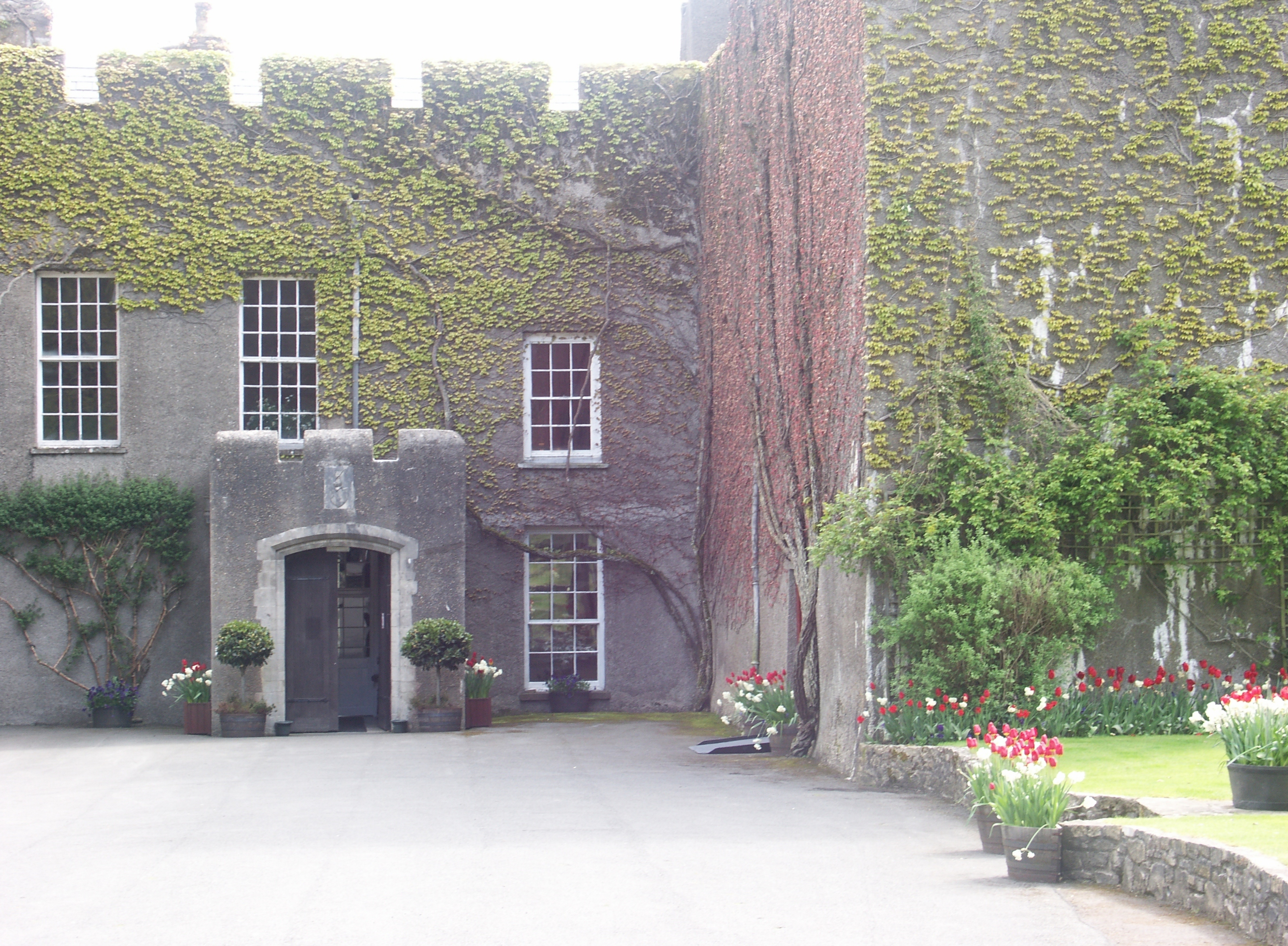
Fonmon Castle

In 1654, he bought Fonmon Castle from the St. John family, who had become obliged to sell, as well as numerous other estates. He became comptroller of Oliver Cromwell's household, In addition, he was appointed a Privy Councillor and sat in Cromwell's Upper House as Philip Lord Jones on 10 December 1657. He superintended the funeral of Oliver Cromwell on 23 November 1658. He was governor of Charterhouse in 1658. In 1659, he commanded the militia in Cardiff Castle 1659.

On the Restoration, he was confirmed as Custos Rotulorum and was High Sheriff of Glamorgan in 1671. Jones died at Fonmon aged 56 and was buried in Penmark Church.

Pembrokeshire aside, most of South Wales had been staunchly Royalist prior to the civil war, and in the resulting power vacuum, Jones was able to rise from comparatively humble beginnings to a position of considerable wealth through purchases and awards of land. From pre-war yeoman's earnings, he ended his life with a four figure income – fabulous riches for those days. Even before the Restoration of the Monarchy, there were calls for Jones's trial from the Royalists who had forfeited their lands to him. With Charles II in place, Jones was finally brought to trial in 1661 for having carried away the organ of St. Mary's Swansea, a charge he survived to die in his bed.

== Family ==
Jones married a daughter of William Price of Gellihir in 1642. He had a son Oliver, and a grandson Robert, who was also an MP.
