= Llewellyn Morgan =

Welsh footballer

Personal information
- Full name: Llewellyn David Morgan
- Date of birth: 7 March 1905
- Place of birth: Aberdare, England
- Date of death: 1979 (aged 73–74)
- Height: 6 ft 0 in (1.83 m)
- Positions: Centre half; right half

Senior career*
Years	Team	Apps	(Gls)
	Merthyr Town	0	(0)
- Aberdare & Aberaman Athletic
193?–1932	Charlton Athletic	40	(0)
1932–1933	Bradford City	1	(0)
1933–1934	Aldershot	14	(0)
1934–1939	Walsall	192	(1)
- * Club domestic league appearances and goals

Llewellyn David Morgan (7 March 1905 – 1979) was a Welsh professional footballer who played as a centre half or right half. He made nearly 250 appearances in the Football League, of which 192 were for Walsall.

== Career ==
Morgan was born in Aberdare. He spent his early career with Merthyr Town and Aberdare & Aberaman Athletic before making his Football League debut for Charlton Athletic, for whom he made 40 league appearances. He joined Bradford City in June 1932, making 1 league appearance for the club. He left the club in June 1933 to join Aldershot, and later played for Walsall, for whom he made 192 league appearances and scored his only goal at Football League level.

== Sources ==
- Frost, Terry (1988). Bradford City A Complete Record 1903-1988. Breedon Books Sport. ISBN 0-907969-38-0.
