= Mansel baronets of Trimsaran (1697) =

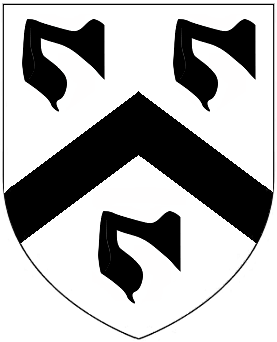
Escutcheon of the Mansel baronets of Trimsaran

The Mansel baronetcy of Trimsaran, in the County of Carmarthen, was created in the Baronetage of England on 22 February 1697 for Edward Mansel, son of Henry Mansel of Stradey. The title became extinct on the death of the 4th Baronet in 1798.

== Mansel baronets, of Trimsaran (1697) ==
- Sir Edward Mansel, 1st Baronet (died 1720)
- Sir Edward Mansel, 2nd Baronet (died 1754)
- Sir Edward Vaughan Mansel, 3rd Baronet (died 1788)
- Sir Edward Joseph Shewen Mansel, 4th Baronet (died 1798)
