= Mansel baronets =

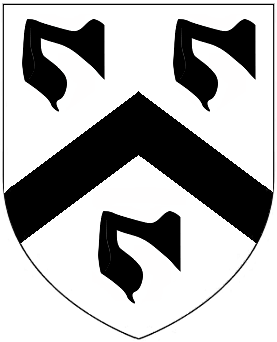
Canting arms of Mansel: Argent, a chevron between three maunches sable

There have been three baronetcies, all in the Baronetage of England, created for members of the Mansel family. One creation is extant as of 2026.

- Mansel baronets of Margam (1611): see Baron Mansel
- Mansel baronets of Muddlescombe (1622)
- Mansel baronets of Trimsaran (1697)
