= Giusto Fernando Tenducci =

Italian opera singer

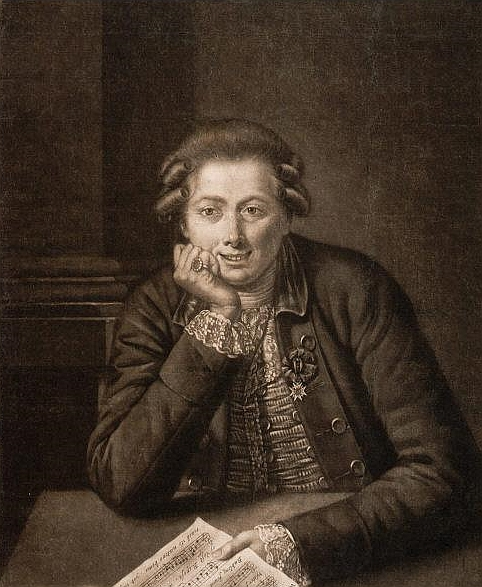
Giusto Fernando Tenducci

Giusto Fernando Tenducci, sometimes called "il Senesino" (c.1735 – 25 January 1790), was a male soprano (castrato) opera singer and composer, who passed his career partly in Italy but chiefly in the United Kingdom.

== Biography ==
Born in Siena in about 1735, Tenducci became a castrato and he was trained at the Naples Conservatory. Castration was illegal in both church and civil law, but the Roman Church employed castrati in many churches and in the Vatican until about 1902; and throughout the 17th and 18th centuries the public paid large sums of money to listen to the spectacular voices of castrati in the opera houses.

In 1753, when he was about seventeen, Tenducci made his professional opera appearance in Venice, as Gasparo in Ferdinando Bertoni's Ginevra. In 1757 and 1758, he was active at the Teatro di San Carlo in Naples.

From 1758 he was in London, where he was first heard at the King's Theatre. He sang an aria by the castrato Caffarelli in Baldassare Galuppi's Attalo, and the following year he was singing in Gioacchino Cocchi's Ciro riconosciuto. He was still singing as "second man" but Charles Burney thought he was the best. He spent eight months in a debtors prison, but by 1764 he was back at the King's Theatre where he befriended Johann Christian Bach, singing the title role in the latter's new opera Adriano in Siria, opposite Giovanni Manzuoli as the "primo uomo" (leading male singer).

He then moved to Ireland, singing and also arranging operas for the Smock Alley Theatre. In 1765, in Dublin he met Dorothea Maunsell whom he married in 1766. In 1768, he returned to London from Edinburgh where he remained for most of the rest of his life, except for a period between 1771 and 1778 when he appeared in many roles in Italy, then traveled to Paris. He taught singing to Wolfgang Amadeus Mozart in Paris in 1777–8. Impressed with his teacher's singing abilities, Mozart wrote a concert aria for him which is now lost (K. 315b).

He returned to Italy just months before his death in January 1790 in Genoa.

== Marriage: 1766–1772 ==
Although a castrato, Tenducci married 15-year-old Dorothea Maunsell secretly in 1766. The marriage was repeated in July 1767 with a licence granted by the Bishop of Waterford and Lismore. In 1772, those marriages were annulled on the grounds of non-consummation or impotence, which was one of the few grounds that women could use to sue for divorce. However, Giacomo Casanova claimed in his autobiography that Dorothea gave birth to two children. His subsequent biographer Helen Berry was unable to corroborate this claim and suggested that they may have been the children of Dorothea's second husband, Robert Long Kingsman.

Two portraits of Tenducci were painted by Thomas Gainsborough. One is now in the Barber Institute of Fine Arts at the University of Birmingham, the other was sold from the collection of Yves Saint Laurent.

== Appearance in literature ==
In 1766, Tenducci sang the part of Arbaces in Arne's opera Artaxerxes in Dublin, delighting the public by "his exquisite singing of the air 'Water parted from the Sea'". A group known as the "frolicsome Dublin boys" sang a song about him: "Tenducci was a piper's son/ and he was in love when he was young,/ and all the tunes that he could play/ was Water parted from the say." James Joyce quoted and parodied that song in Finnegans Wake, II.3.

Tenducci is mentioned in Robert Fergusson's poem "The Canongate Playhouse in Ruins"; while in Edinburgh, Tenducci sang three songs with lyrics by Fergusson.

Tenducci is mentioned in Tobias Smollet's, "The Expedition of Humphry Clinker," (pub. 1771), Vol. I, in a letter of Lydia Melford, in which she describes his voice as "neither man's nor woman's but it is more melodious then either and warbled so divinely, that, while I listened, I really thought myself in paradise."

A "Dorothea Kingsman vs Ferdinando Tenducci" is also mentioned in a suit for libel in October 1775 in the 7th volume (p. 123-173) of the 1780 work "Trials for adultery or the history of divorces, being select trials at Doctors Commons", by a "civilian" (printed in London for S. Blason, 7 volumes in-8° in total, rare, only one edition in 1780). The case confirms and details that Dorothea Maunsell, her former music pupil and daughter of Counsellor Maunsell of Molesworth street, Dublin, sued for annulment of the marriage for impotency, F. Tenducci having undergone an "entire castration", which is discussed with witnesses in the case, along with the circumstances of the 1766 (catholic priest) and 1767 (Church of England minister) marriage ceremonies. The marriages were declared null and void.
