= Edward Mansel =

Welsh politician (1637–1706)

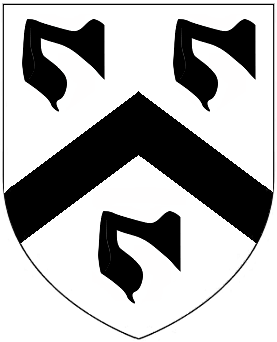
Canting arms of Mansel: Argent, a chevron between three maunches sable

Sir Edward Mansel, 4th Baronet (c. October 1637 – 14 November 1706) was a Welsh politician who sat in the House of Commons in three periods between 1660 and 1689.

Mansel was the son of Sir Lewis Mansel, 2nd Baronet of Margam and his third wife Lady Elizabeth Montagu, daughter of Henry Montagu, 1st Earl of Manchester. He inherited the baronetcy of Margam on the death of his brother Henry who died in infancy in around 1640.

In 1660, Mansel was elected Member of Parliament for Glamorgan in the Convention Parliament. He was re-elected MP for Glamorgan in 1670 for the Cavalier Parliament and sat until 1679. In 1681 he was re-elected MP for Glamorgan and held the seat until 1689. In 1660 he was appointed a commissioner of militia in Glamorgan and was the Colonel of the Glamorganshire Militia in 1665 and again, in 1697. In 1688, he was appointed High Sheriff of Glamorgan.

Mansel was an influential person in South Wales. The Duke of Beaufort, when Lord President of Wales, visited Margam during his "Progress" in 1684. Mansel died at the age of 69.

== Family ==
Mansel married Martha Carne, daughter of Edward Carne of Ewenny, Glamorgan. His son, Thomas, succeeded to the baronetcy and was created Baron Mansel. His daughter Martha married Thomas Morgan of Tredegar, which marriage and its after-effects caused the baronet much trouble because Thomas Morgan was reluctant to return from a tour on the continent of Europe. His daughter Elizabeth married Sir Edward Stradling, 5th Baronet.

Parliament of England
Preceded by Evan Seys	Member of Parliament for Glamorganshire; 1660 – 1661	Succeeded by William Herbert
Preceded by William Herbert	Member of Parliament for Glamorganshire; 1670 – 1679	Succeeded by Bussy Mansel
Preceded by Bussy Mansel	Member of Parliament for Glamorganshire; 1681 – 1689	Succeeded by Bussy Mansel
Baronetage of England
Preceded by Henry Mansel	Baronet (of Margam); 1860–1892	Succeeded by Thomas Mansel
