= Lewis Morgan (Welsh politician) =

Lewis Morgan (died 3 July 1635) was a Welsh politician who sat in the House of Commons from 1628 to 1629.

Morgan was the son of Sir Thomas Morgan, of Ruperra. In 1628, he was elected Member of Parliament for Cardiff and sat until 1629 when King Charles decided to rule without parliament for eleven years. He was knighted at Whitehall on 25 March 1629.

Morgan died in his father's lifetime at Hampstead in 1635.

Morgan married Ann Morgan, daughter of General Sir Charles Morgan, of Delft.

Parliament of England
Preceded by William Price	Member of Parliament for Cardiff; 1628–1629	Parliament suspended until 1640
