= Dorothea Maunsell =

Italian opera singer

- Born: about 1750; Dublin, Ireland
- Other names: Dorothea Tenducci, Dorothea Kingsman
- Occupation: singer
- Known for: marrying a castrato and then obtaining a divorce
- Spouse(s): Giusto Fernando Tenducci, Robert Long Kingsman

Dorothea Maunsell (born c. 1750), who became Dorothea Kingsman after being Dorothea Tenducci, was an Irish singer at the centre of a scandal after she married (and later divorced) an Italian castrato opera singer named Giusto Fernando Tenducci. She had children with her second husband.

== Life ==
Maunsell was born in Dublin in about 1750. Her parents were Dorothy and Thomas Maunsell. Her father was a lawyer who became the member of parliament for Killmarnock in 1769 and owned land in Waterford and Limerick. Maunsell was brought up in Molesworth Street in Dublin. She had seven siblings; “all the brothers did well and her sisters all married well - and then there was Dorothea”.

Giusto Tenducci was an opera star of the time who later gave singing lessons to Mozart. He had been (illegally) castrated as a teenager to stop his voice from breaking during puberty.

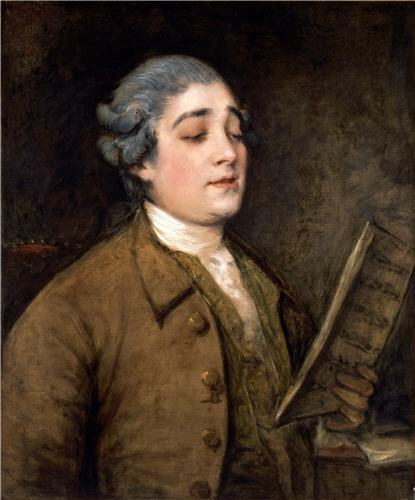
Portrait of Tenducci by Thomas Gainsborough

Much of the detail of Maunsell’s life comes from a publication titled "The True and Genuine Narrative of Mr and Mrs Tenducci: in a Letter to a Friend at Bath" which was published in 1768. According to this source, she took music lessons from Tenducci. During the lessons she developed a "tender affection" for him, even though he was fifteen years older than her. Her father was keen to marry her to a man her had chosen, but Maunsell realised that Tenducci was a possible alternative.

Although a castrato, Tenducci married 15-year-old Maunsell secretly in 1766. The marriage was repeated in July 1767 with a license granted by the Bishop of Waterford and Lismore. In 1772, this marriage was annulled on the grounds of non-consummation or impotence, which was one of the few grounds that women could use to sue for divorce. However, Giacomo Casanova claimed in his autobiography that Dorothea gave birth to two children. His subsequent biographer Helen Berry was unable to corroborate this claim and suggests that they may have been the children of Dorothea's second husband, Robert Long Kingsman.

== Death and legacy ==
Maunsell moved to Kingsclere, Hampshire with her second husband and had four children with him there. She died aged 63 in Grosvenor Place, London and was buried at St George Hanover Square 21 February 1814. In 2012 Helen Berry wrote a fictionalised biography of her life in "The Castrato and his Wife".
