= Glamorganshire (UK Parliament constituency) =

UK Parliament constituency (1801–1885)

- Former county constituency for the House of Commons

1536–1885
- Seats: two
- Replaced by: East Glamorganshire, South Glamorganshire, Mid Glamorganshire, Gower and Rhondda

Glamorganshire was a parliamentary constituency in Wales, returning two Members of Parliament (MPs) to the English and later British House of Commons. The Redistribution of Seats Act 1885 divided it into five new constituencies: East Glamorganshire, South Glamorganshire, Mid Glamorganshire, Gower and Rhondda.

== Boundaries ==
This constituency comprised the whole of Glamorganshire.

== History ==
For most of its history, the county constituency was represented by landowners from a small number of aristocratic families and this pattern continued until the nineteenth century. Following the Great Reform Act 1832 a second county seat was created.

By the 1850s it had become virtually impossible for a Tory candidate to be elected as a county member since the industrial and urban vote could be rallied against him. This was proved in 1857 when Nash Vaughan Edwards-Vaughan failed in his attempt to dislodge one of the sitting members. Thereafter, until redistribution in 1885 led to the abolition of the constituency, the representation was shared by C. R. M. Talbot and Hussey Vivian. In line with Liberal party policy in two-member constituencies to run candidates from both wings of the party, the Whig aristocrat Talbot collaborated well with the more Radical Vivian.

== Members of Parliament ==
=== MPs 1541–1832 ===
Election	Member	Party
1541	Sir George Herbert	
1545	not known	
1547	John Bassett	
1553 (Mar)	George Mathew	
1553 (Oct)	Anthony Mansell	
1554 (Apr)	Edward Mansell	
1554 (Nov)	Sir Edward Carne	
1555	not known	
1558	William Herbert I	
1559	William Herbert I	
1562–3	William Bassett	
1571	William Bassett	
1572	William Herbert II, died and replaced 1577 by William Mathew	
1584	Robert Sidney	
1586	Thomas Carne	
1588	Thomas Carne	
1593	Sir Robert Sidney	
1597	Sir Thomas Mansell	
1601	Sir John Herbert	
1604	Philip Herbert, ennobled and replaced 1605 by Sir Thomas Mansell	
1614	Sir Thomas Mansell	
1621	William Price	
1624	Sir Robert Mansell	
1625	Sir Robert Mansell	
1626	Sir John Stradling	
1628	Sir Robert Mansell	
1640 (Apr)	Sir Edward Stradling	
1640 (Nov)	Philip, Lord Herbert (inherited peerage 1649)	
1653	Not represented in Barebones Parliament	
1654	Philip Jones; Edmund Thomas	
1656	Philip Jones; Edmund Thomas	
1659	Evan Seys	
1660	Sir Edward Mansel	
1661	William Herbert, later Earl of Pembroke	
1670	Sir Edward Mansel	
1679	Bussy Mansel	
1681	Sir Edward Mansel	
1689	Bussy Mansel	
1699	Thomas Mansel, later Baron Mansel	
1712	Robert Jones	
1716	Sir Charles Kemeys	
1734	William Talbot, later Earl Talbot	
1737	Bussy Mansel, later Baron Mansel	
1745	Thomas Mathews	
1747	Charles Edwin	
1756	Thomas William Mathews	
1761	Sir Edmund Thomas	
1767	Richard Turbervill	
1768	George Venables-Vernon, later Baron Vernon	
1780	Charles Edwin	
1789	Thomas Wyndham	Tory
1814	Benjamin Hall	Whig
1817	Sir Christopher Cole	Tory
1818	John Edwards	Whig
1820	Sir Christopher Cole	Tory
1830	Christopher Rice Mansel Talbot	Whig

=== MPs 1832–1885 ===
Election	First member	1st Party	2nd member	2nd Party
1832	representation increased to two members under the Reform Act 1832			
1832	Christopher Rice Mansel Talbot	Whig	Lewis Weston Dillwyn	Whig
1837	Christopher Rice Mansel Talbot	Whig	Edwin Wyndham-Quin, Viscount Adare	Conservative
1851	Christopher Rice Mansel Talbot	Whig	George Tyler	Conservative
1857	Christopher Rice Mansel Talbot	Whig	Sir Henry Vivian	Whig
1859	Christopher Rice Mansel Talbot	Liberal	Sir Henry Vivian	Liberal
1885	constituency abolished: see East Glamorganshire, South Glamorganshire, Mid Glamorganshire, Gower and Rhondda			

== Election results ==
=== Elections in the 1830s ===
General election 1830: Glamorganshire
Party	Candidate	Votes	%
Whig	Christopher Rice Mansel Talbot	Unopposed	
Registered electors		c. 3,000	
Whig gain from Tory			

General election 1831: Glamorganshire
Party	Candidate	Votes	%
Whig	Christopher Rice Mansel Talbot	Unopposed	
Registered electors		c. 3,000	
Whig hold			

General election 1832: Glamorganshire
Party	Candidate	Votes	%
Whig	Christopher Rice Mansel Talbot	Unopposed	
Whig	Lewis Weston Dillwyn	Unopposed	
Registered electors		3,680	
Whig hold			
Whig win (new seat)			

General election 1835: Glamorganshire
Party	Candidate	Votes	%
Whig	Christopher Rice Mansel Talbot	Unopposed	
Whig	Lewis Weston Dillwyn	Unopposed	
Registered electors		3,611	
Whig hold			
Whig hold			

General election 1837: Glamorganshire
Party	Candidate	Votes	%
Conservative	Edward Wyndham-Quin	2,009	37.3
Whig	Christopher Rice Mansel Talbot	1,794	33.3
Whig	John Josiah Guest	1,590	29.5
Turnout		3,601	82.3
Registered electors		4,373	
Majority		419	7.8
Conservative gain from Whig			
Majority		204	3.8
Whig hold			

=== Elections in the 1840s ===
General election 1841: Glamorganshire
Party	Candidate	Votes	%	±%
Conservative	Edwin Wyndham-Quin	Unopposed		
Whig	Christopher Rice Mansel Talbot	Unopposed		
Registered electors		5,384		
Conservative hold				
Whig hold				

General election 1847: Glamorganshire
Party	Candidate	Votes	%	±%
Conservative	Edwin Wyndham-Quin	Unopposed		
Whig	Christopher Rice Mansel Talbot	Unopposed		
Registered electors		5,775		
Conservative hold				
Whig hold				

=== Elections in the 1850s ===
Wyndham-Quin was appointed Steward of the Chiltern Hundreds, causing a by-election.

By-election, 25 February 1851: Glamorganshire
Party	Candidate	Votes	%	±%
Conservative	George Tyler	Unopposed		
Conservative hold				

General election 1852: Glamorganshire
Party	Candidate	Votes	%	±%
Conservative	George Tyler	Unopposed		
Whig	Christopher Rice Mansel Talbot	Unopposed		
Registered electors		6,424		
Conservative hold				
Whig hold				

General election 1857: Glamorganshire
Party	Candidate	Votes	%	±%
Whig	Christopher Rice Mansel Talbot	3,161	38.3	N/A
Whig	Henry Vivian	3,002	36.4	N/A
Conservative	Nash Vaughan Edwards-Vaughan	2,088	25.3	N/A
Majority		914	11.1	N/A
Turnout		5,170 (est)	81.3 (est)	N/A
Registered electors		6,356		
Whig hold		Swing	N/A	
Whig gain from Conservative		Swing	N/A	

General election 1859: Glamorganshire
Party	Candidate	Votes	%	±%
Liberal	Henry Vivian	Unopposed		
Liberal	Christopher Rice Mansel Talbot	Unopposed		
Registered electors		6,600		
Liberal hold				
Liberal hold				

=== Elections in the 1860s ===
General election 1865: Glamorganshire
Party	Candidate	Votes	%	±%
Liberal	Henry Vivian	Unopposed		
Liberal	Christopher Rice Mansel Talbot	Unopposed		
Registered electors		6,759		
Liberal hold				
Liberal hold				

General election 1868: Glamorganshire
Party	Candidate	Votes	%	±%
Liberal	Henry Vivian	Unopposed		
Liberal	Christopher Rice Mansel Talbot	Unopposed		
Registered electors		11,329		
Liberal hold				
Liberal hold				

=== Elections in the 1870s ===
General election 1874: Glamorganshire
Party	Candidate	Votes	%	±%
Liberal	Henry Vivian	4,100	35.7	N/A
Liberal	Christopher Rice Mansel Talbot	4,040	35.1	N/A
Conservative	Ivor Guest	3,355	29.2	New
Majority		685	5.9	N/A
Turnout		7,425 (est)	74.2 (est)	N/A
Registered electors		10,006		
Liberal hold				
Liberal hold				

=== Elections in the 1880s ===
General election 1880: Glamorganshire
Party	Candidate	Votes	%	±%
Liberal	Christopher Rice Mansel Talbot	Unopposed		
Liberal	Henry Vivian	Unopposed		
Registered electors		12,811		
Liberal hold				
Liberal hold				

== Sources ==
=== Books and Journals ===
- Campbell, Thomas Methuen (2000). "C.R.M. Talbot 1803–1890". Morgannwg. 44: 66–104.
- Morgan, Kenneth O. (1960). "Democratic Politics in Glamorgan, 1884–1914". Morgannwg. 4: 5–27.

=== Other ===
- A map of Glamorganshire in 1885, showing its new divisions.
- Leigh Rayment's Historical List of MPs – Constituencies beginning with "G" (part 1)
- Boundary Commission review Original Map from 1832 showing Glamorganshire constituency
