= Sir Thomas Mansell, 1st Baronet =

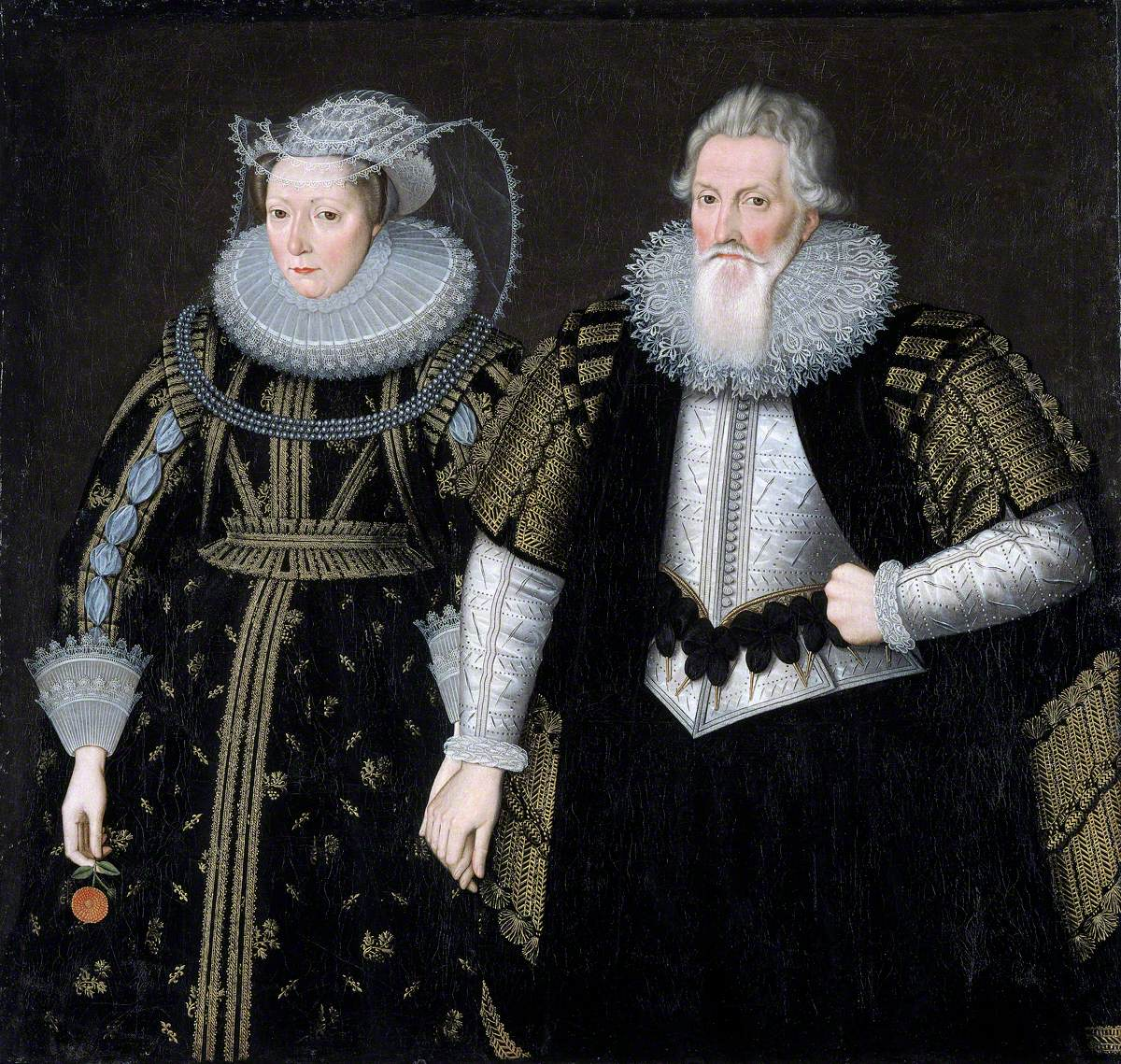

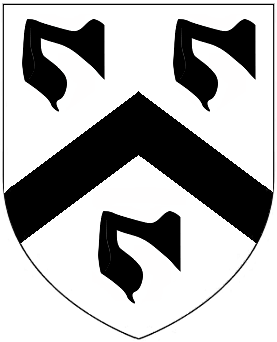
Canting arms of Mansel: Argent, a chevron between three maunches sable

Sir Thomas Mansell, 1st Baronet (1556 – 20 December 1631) was a Welsh politician who sat in the House of Commons at various times between 1597 and 1614.

Mansell was the eldest son of Sir Edward Mansall of Margam. Mansell was knighted in 1581. Then in 1593 Mansell was High Sheriff of Glamorgan. In 1597, he was elected Member of Parliament for Glamorgan. He was appointed one of council of the Marches on 7 July 1602 and was High Sheriff of Glamorgan again in 1603.

In 1605 Mansell was re-elected MP for Glamorgan and sat until 1611. He was created a baronet on 22 May 1611. He was re-elected MP for Glamorgan in 1614 for the Addled Parliament.

Mansell died at the age of 75 and was buried at Margam.

Mansell married firstly Mary daughter of Lewis Lord Mordaunt. His second marriage was to Jane Fuller, widow successively of John Bussey of Hainor Lincolnshire and John Fuller, and daughter of Thomas Pole or Powell of Bishops Hall.

Parliament of England
| Preceded by Robert Sydney | Member of Parliament for Glamorgan; 1597 | Succeeded by Philip Herbert |
| Preceded by Philip Herbert | Member of Parliament for Glamorgan; 1605–1614 | Succeeded by William Price |
Baronetage of England
| New creation | Baronet (of Margam); 1611–1631 | Succeeded by Lewis Mansel |
