= George Venables-Vernon, 2nd Baron Vernon =

English baron (1735–1813)

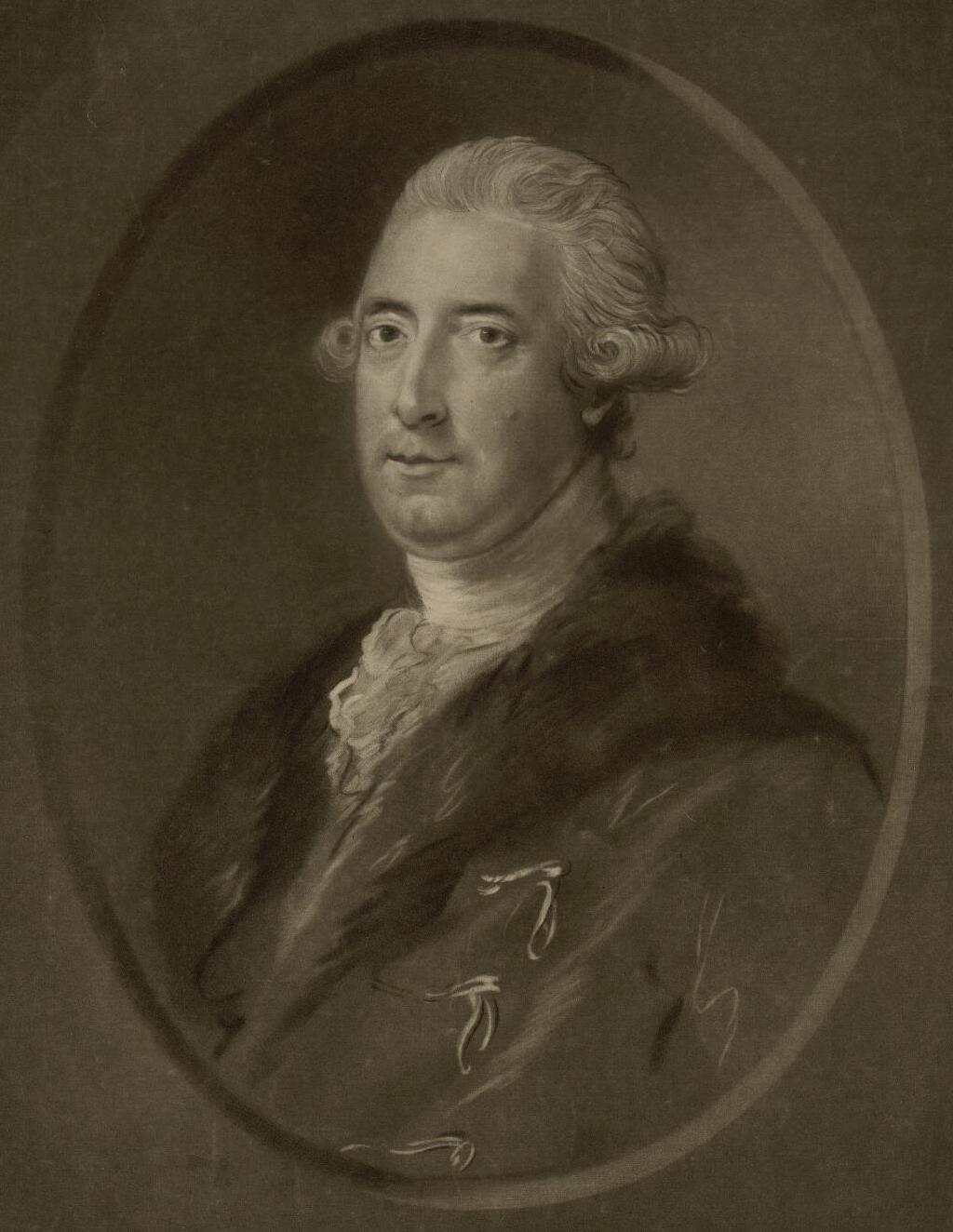
George Venables-Vernon

George Venables-Vernon, 2nd Baron Vernon (9 May 1735 – 18 June 1813), was the 2nd Baron Vernon. He acceded to the title in 1780 after the death of his father George Venables-Vernon, first Baron Vernon.

== Early life ==
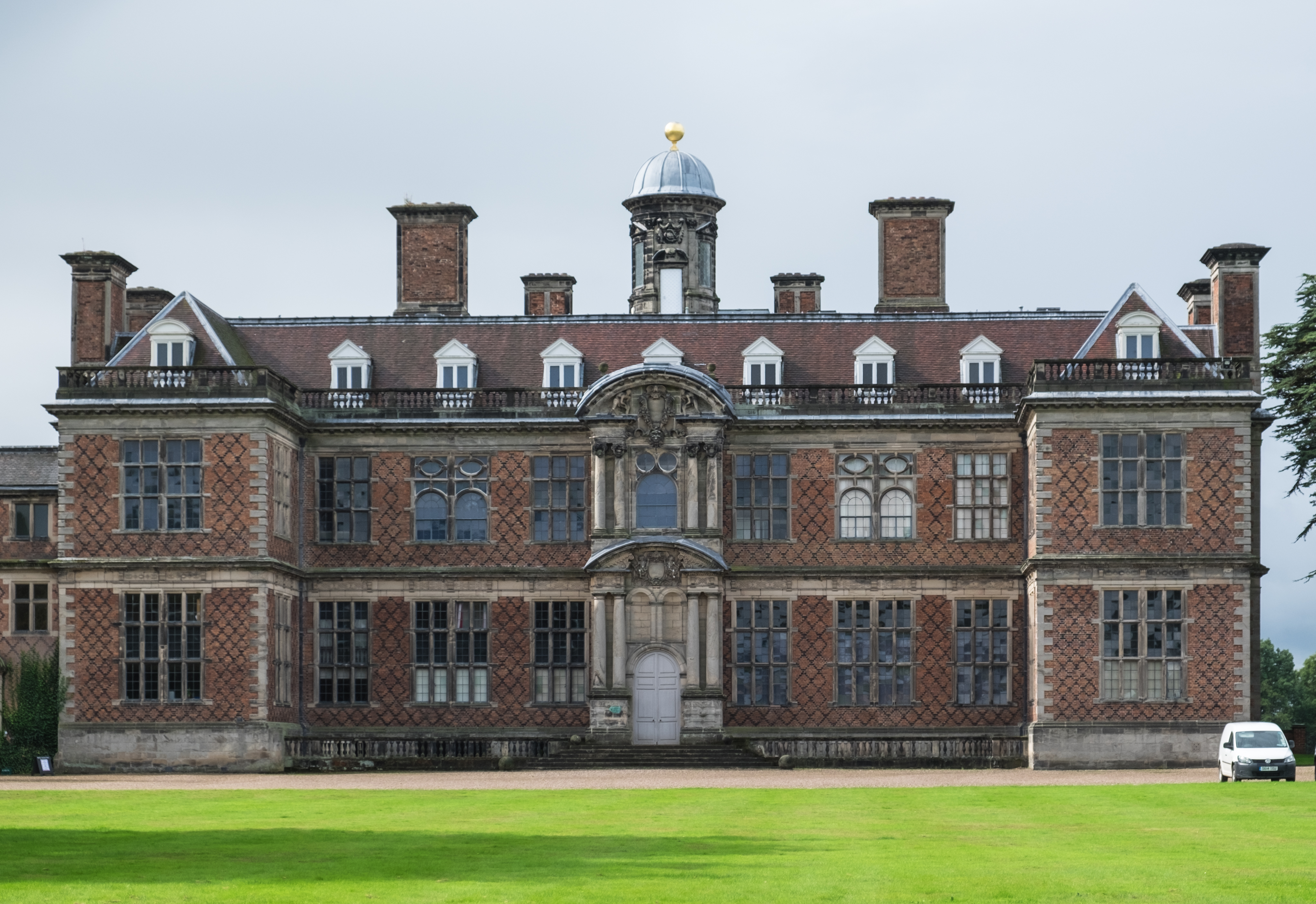
Sudbury Hall, Derbyshire

He was the only son of George Venables-Vernon, 1st Baron Vernon and, his first wife, Hon. Mary Howard, daughter of Thomas Howard, 6th Baron Howard of Effingham. His paternal grandparents were Henry Vernon, MP for Staffordshire and Newcastle-under-Lyme, and the former Anne Pigott (daughter and heiress of Thomas Pigott of Chetwynd).

Vernon was educated at Westminster School and at Trinity Hall, Cambridge, proceeding MA in 1755.

== Career ==
He served as a Whig member of parliament for Weobley from 1757 to 1761, Bramber from 1762 to 1768 and Glamorganshire from 1768 to 1780. "Only one speech by him is reported: 1 May 1769, on a point of privilege."

Through his first wife, he inherited the Briton Ferry estate in Glamorgan and Newick Park in Sussex in 1750 and served as vice president of the Welch Charity. He inherited the family seat at Sudbury Hall in Derbyshire in 1780 on the death of his father. Bradwall Hall, near Sandbach, Cheshire, was also owned by the Barons Vernon until it was conveyed to John Latham, president of the Royal College of Physicians.

== Personal life ==
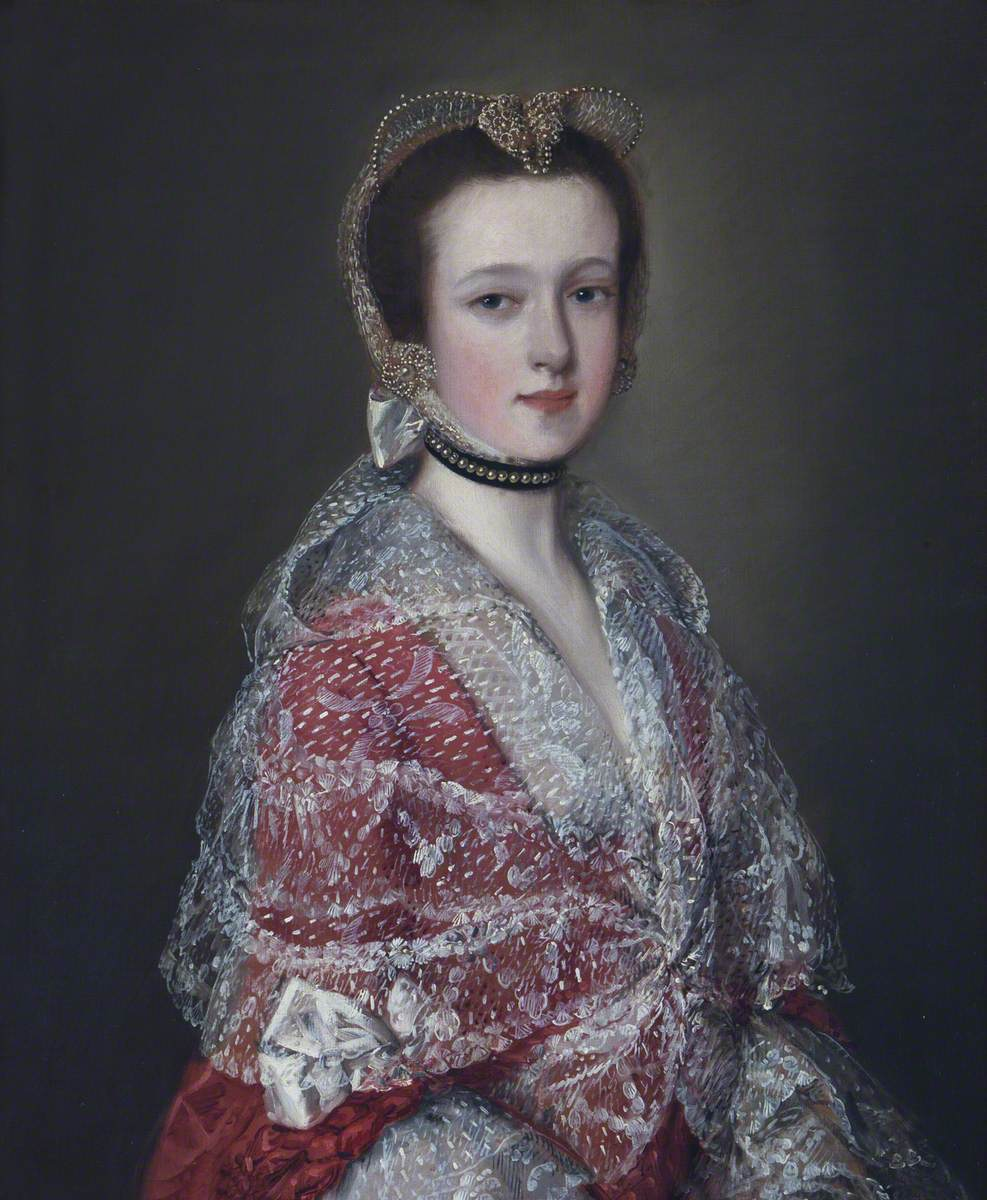
Portrait of his first wife, Hon. Louisa Barbara Mansel, by Thomas Gainsborough, between 1763 and 1767

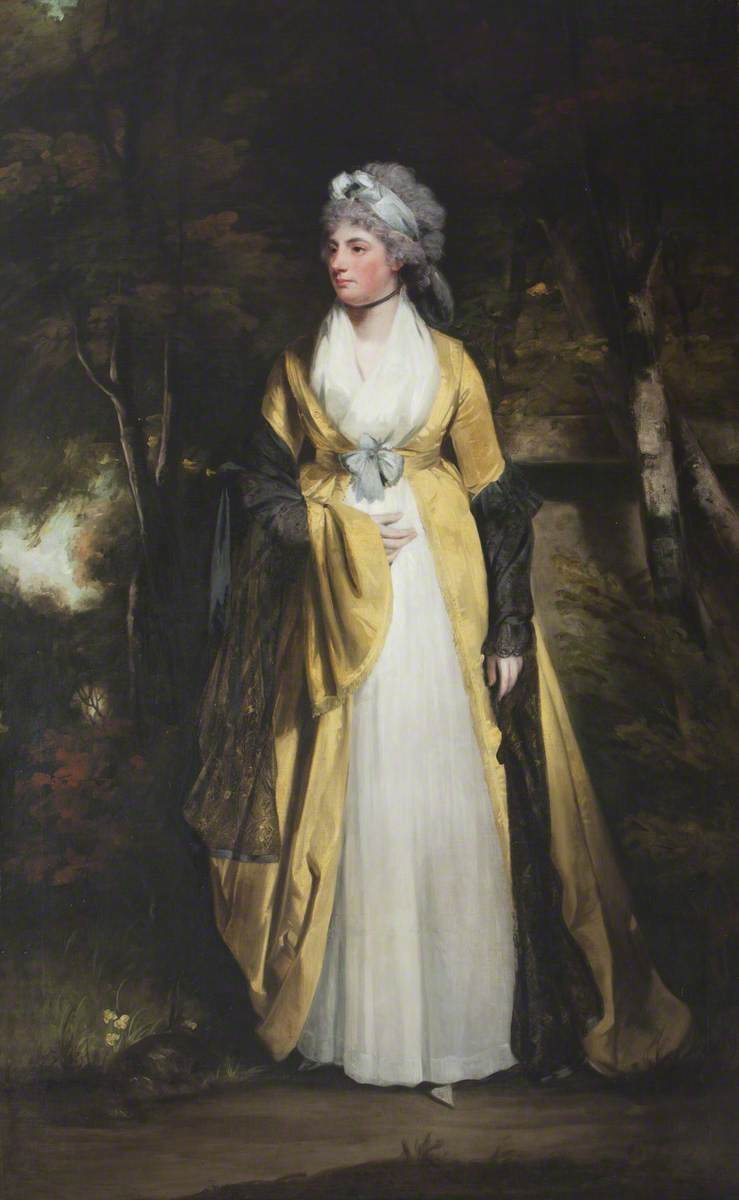
Portrait of his second wife, Jane Georgiana Fauquier, by John Hoppner, between 1785 and 1800

His first wife was Hon. Louisa Barbara Mansel, daughter of Bussy Mansel, last Baron Mansel of Margam. They wed on 16 July 1757 and had two sons and two daughters, who died young, including:

- George Venables-Vernon (1761–1763), who died young and was buried at Newick.
- George Venables-Vernon (1773–1773), who died in infancy and was also buried at Newick.

He married secondly, Jane Georgiana Fauquier, daughter of William Fauquier of Hanover, on 25 May 1786. With her he had two more daughters, one of whom died young, including:

- Hon. Georgiana Venables-Vernon (1788–1824), who married, as his first wife, Edward Harbord, 3rd Baron Suffield, in 1809.

After Vernon died in 1813, his title passed to his half-brother Henry, the eldest son of the first Baron's third marriage.

=== Legacy ===
His full-length portrait was painted by Thomas Gainsborough (1727–1788) in 1767. The painting, which is often referred to as "The Hunting Lord," belongs to Southampton City Art Gallery's permanent collection, acquired 1957.

Parliament of Great Britain
Preceded by John Craster; Captain Savage Mostyn	Member of Parliament for Weobley; 1757–1761; With: John Craster	Succeeded by Marquess of Titchfield; Hon. Henry Thynne
Preceded by The Lord Winterton; William Fitzherbert	Member of Parliament for Bramber; 1762–1768; With: The Lord Winterton	Succeeded by The Lord Winterton; Charles Lowndes
Preceded by Richard Turbervill	Member of Parliament for Glamorganshire; 1768–1780	Succeeded by Charles Edwin
Peerage of Great Britain
Preceded by George Venables-Vernon	Baron Vernon; 1780–1813	Succeeded by Henry Venables-Vernon
