= Maunsell =

Maunsell is a surname, also encountered as 'Mansel', 'Maunsel', and 'Mansell', and in some cases a cognate of 'Mansfield'. Per MacLysaght, of Norman origin, and closely associated with County Limerick and County Tipperary since the seventeenth century, but on record there and County Wexford as early as the thirteenth century. It has been stated that, the name being Norman in origin, numerous families of the name existed in Northern France for some generations prior to the Norman Conquest. Several branches of the Irish family are extensively treated in Burke's Landed Gentry of Ireland.

Notable people with the surname include:

- Guy Maunsell (1884-1961), British designer of the Maunsell Sea Fort defence system
- Richard Maunsell, Chief Mechanical Engineer of the South Eastern and Chatham Railway and Southern Railway
- John Maunsell, Cleric, Judge as well as Secretary of State and Chancellor to Henry III
- John H. R. Maunsell (born 1955), British-American neuroscientist
- Robert Maunsell (missionary) (1810–1894), English missionary, linguist and translator in New Zealand
- Robert Mansell (1573–1656), admiral of the English Royal Navy and member of parliament
- Robert Maunsell (Royal Navy officer) (1785/6–1845), Royal Navy officer, made post-captain in 1812

== See also ==
- Maunsell Forts, sea forts of the United Kingdom during the Second World War
