= Bussy Mansel, 4th Baron Mansel =

Welsh peer (??–1750)

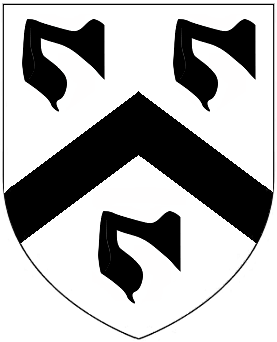
Canting arms of Mansel: Argent, a chevron between three maunches sable

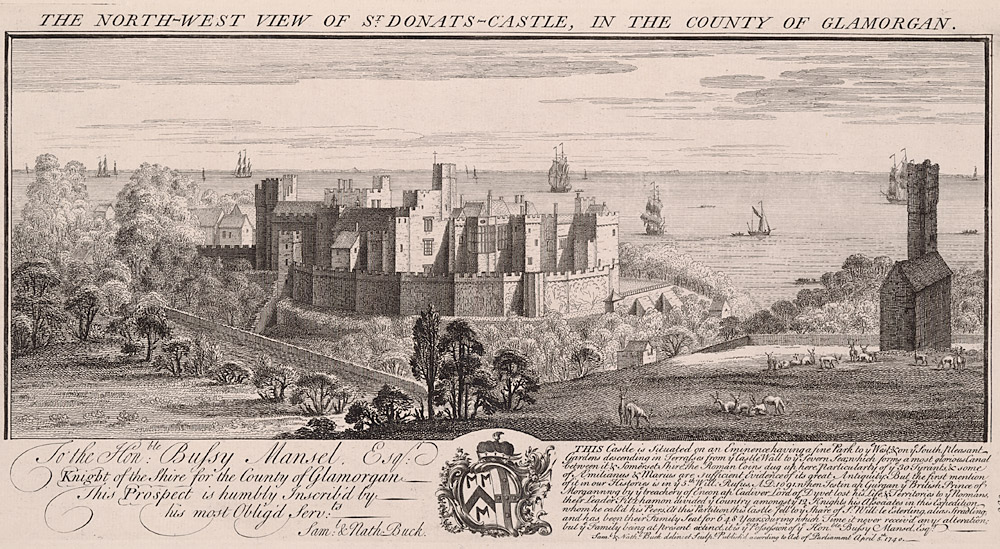
1740 engraving of St Donat's Castle in Glamorgan, a possession of 4th Baron Mansel, inscribed to him

Bussy Mansel, 4th Baron Mansel (sometimes spelled Mansell) (died 29 November 1750) was a Welsh peer.

He succeeded his brother Christopher Mansel as Baron Mansel of Margam (or "Margram") in 1744.

Bussy Mansel married Lady Elizabeth Hervey, the daughter of John Hervey, 1st Earl of Bristol, and sister of John Hervey, 2nd Baron Hervey, on 17 May 1724. On 13 March 1729, he married Barbara Villiers, daughter of William Villiers, 2nd Earl of Jersey; she survived him. He had one daughter by his second marriage, Louisa Barbarina Mansel (2 February 1733 – 16 February 1786), who married George Venables-Vernon, 2nd Baron Vernon, on 16 July 1757. Louisa had no children, and the Margam estate ultimately passed to Bussy's sister Mary.

== Sources ==
- thepeerage.com

Parliament of Great Britain
Preceded by Edward Stradling	Member of Parliament for Cardiff; 1727–1734	Succeeded by Herbert Windsor
Preceded by William Talbot, 1st Earl Talbot	Member of Parliament for Glamorganshire; 1737–1745	Succeeded by Thomas Mathews
Peerage of Great Britain
Preceded by Christopher Mansel	Baron Mansel; 1744–1750	Extinct
