= Lewis Mansel =

Welsh landowner (1594–1638)

Sir Lewis Mansel of Margam, 2nd Baronet (died 1638) was a Welsh landowner.

He was the eldest son of Sir Thomas Mansel, 1st Baronet and Mary Mordaunt, a daughter of Lewis Mordaunt, 3rd Baron Mordaunt. He attended Jesus College, Oxford in 1601. He inherited the baronetcy when his father died in 1631. The family homes included Margam, Oxwich Castle, and Penrice Castle.

He married Catherine or Kate Sidney, a daughter of Robert Sidney, 1st Earl of Leicester and Barbara Gamage.

Robert Sidney was Chamberlain to Anne of Denmark. She travelled to Bath in August 1615 for her health. Mansel and Kate joined him from Margam as she wanted medical advice from the physicians at Bath. After Kate's death at Baynard's Castle on 8 May 1616, Lewis Mansel married Katherine Lewis, daughter of Sir Edward Lewis of Van.

His third wife was Elizabeth Montagu, a daughter of Henry Montagu, 1st Earl of Manchester. Their children included:

- Sir Henry Mansel, 3rd Baron Mansel
- Sir Edward Mansel, 4th Baron Mansel (1637-1706), who married Martha Carne, a daughter of Edward Carne of Ewenny

He was High Sheriff of Glamorgan in 1637. Lewis Mansel died in 1638 and was buried at Margam Abbey.

Baronetage of England
Preceded by Thomas Mansel	Baronet; 1631–1638	Succeeded by Henry Mansel
