= Baron Mansel =

Barony in the Peerage of Great Britain

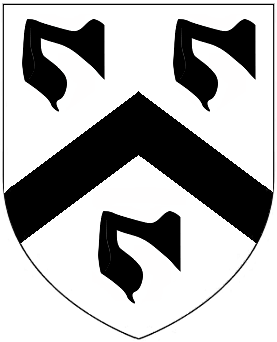
Canting arms of Mansel: Argent, a chevron between three maunches sable

Baron Mansel, of Margam in the County of Glamorgan, was a title in the Peerage of Great Britain. It was created on 1 January 1712 for Sir Thomas Mansel, 5th Baronet, previously Member of Parliament for Cardiff and Glamorganshire. His ancestor had been created a Baronet, of Margam in the County of Glamorgan, in the Baronetage of England on 22 May 1611. The fourth Baronet represented Glamorgan in the House of Commons. The fourth Baron sat as Member of Parliament for Cardiff. On his death 29 November 1750 the barony and baronetcy became extinct.

On the death of the 4th baron, the Margam estates passed to his daughter Louisa, who married George Venables-Vernon, subsequently 2nd Baron Vernon. Following her death without issue in 1786, it passed to her aunt Mary Mansell, who had married John Ivory Talbot of Lacock Abbey, Wiltshire. However, other parts of the estates (subsequently known as the Briton Ferry estate) passed to her uncle Thomas Earl of Clarendon then to William Henry Augustus Villiers (who took the surname Mansell to inherit this estate). On his death without issue, it passed to his elder brother's son George Child Villiers, 5th Earl of Jersey.

Francis Mansel, younger brother of the first Baronet, was created a Baronet in 1622 (see Mansel Baronets).

== Mansel Baronets, of Margam (1611) ==
- Sir Thomas Mansel, 1st Baronet (died 1631)
- Sir Lewis Mansel, 2nd Baronet (c. 1594–1638)
- Sir Henry Mansel, 3rd Baronet (c. 1629–c. 1640)
- Sir Edward Mansel, 4th Baronet (c. 1637–1706)
- Sir Thomas Mansel, 5th Baronet (1667–1723) (created Baron Mansel in 1712)

== Barons Mansel (1712) ==
- Thomas Mansel, 1st Baron Mansel (1667–1723)
- Thomas Mansel, 2nd Baron Mansel (1719–1744)
- Christopher Mansel, 3rd Baron Mansel (d. 1744)
- Bussy Mansel, 4th Baron Mansel (d. 1750)

== Notes ==
Baronetage of England
Preceded by Molyneux baronets	Mansel baronets of Margam; 22 May 1611	Succeeded by Shirley baronets
