= List of MPs elected to the English parliament in 1659 =

This is a list of members of Parliament (MPs) in the Third Protectorate Parliament under the Commonwealth of England which began at Westminster on 27 January 1659, and was held until 22 April 1659.

This Parliament was called by Richard Cromwell and was dissolved by him after three months, shortly before he was turned out of the Protectorship. The parliament was succeeded by a restoration of the last parliament called by Royal Authority, which was originally the Long Parliament called on 3 November 1640, but subsequently reduced to the Rump parliament under Pride's Purge. This summoned a new Convention Parliament to meet on 25 April 1660, which called back the King, and restored the Constitution in Church and State.

This list contains details of the MPs elected in 1659. The preceding First and Second Protectorate Parliaments had excluded a number of Rotten Boroughs and given representation to several towns including Manchester, Leeds and Halifax and to the county and city of Durham. The Third Protectorate Parliament reverted to the earlier full representation for England but still included representatives from Scotland and Ireland.

== List of constituencies and members ==
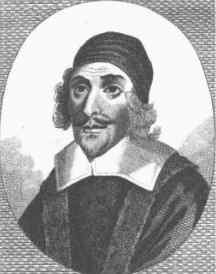
Thomas Scot (Wycombe)

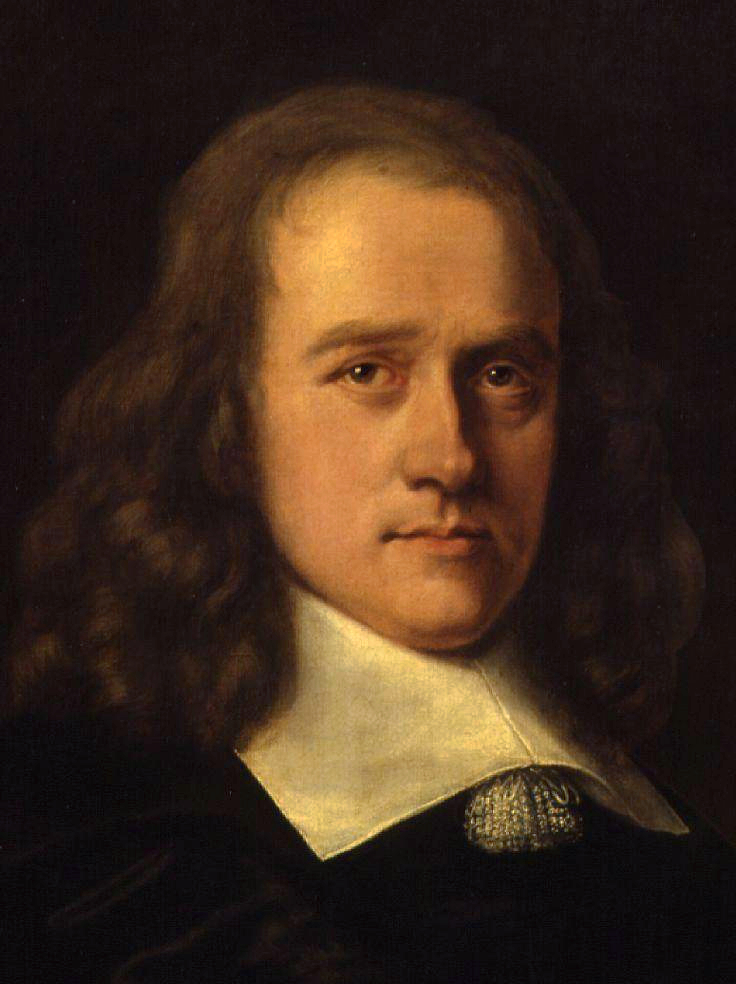
John Thurloe (Cambridge University)

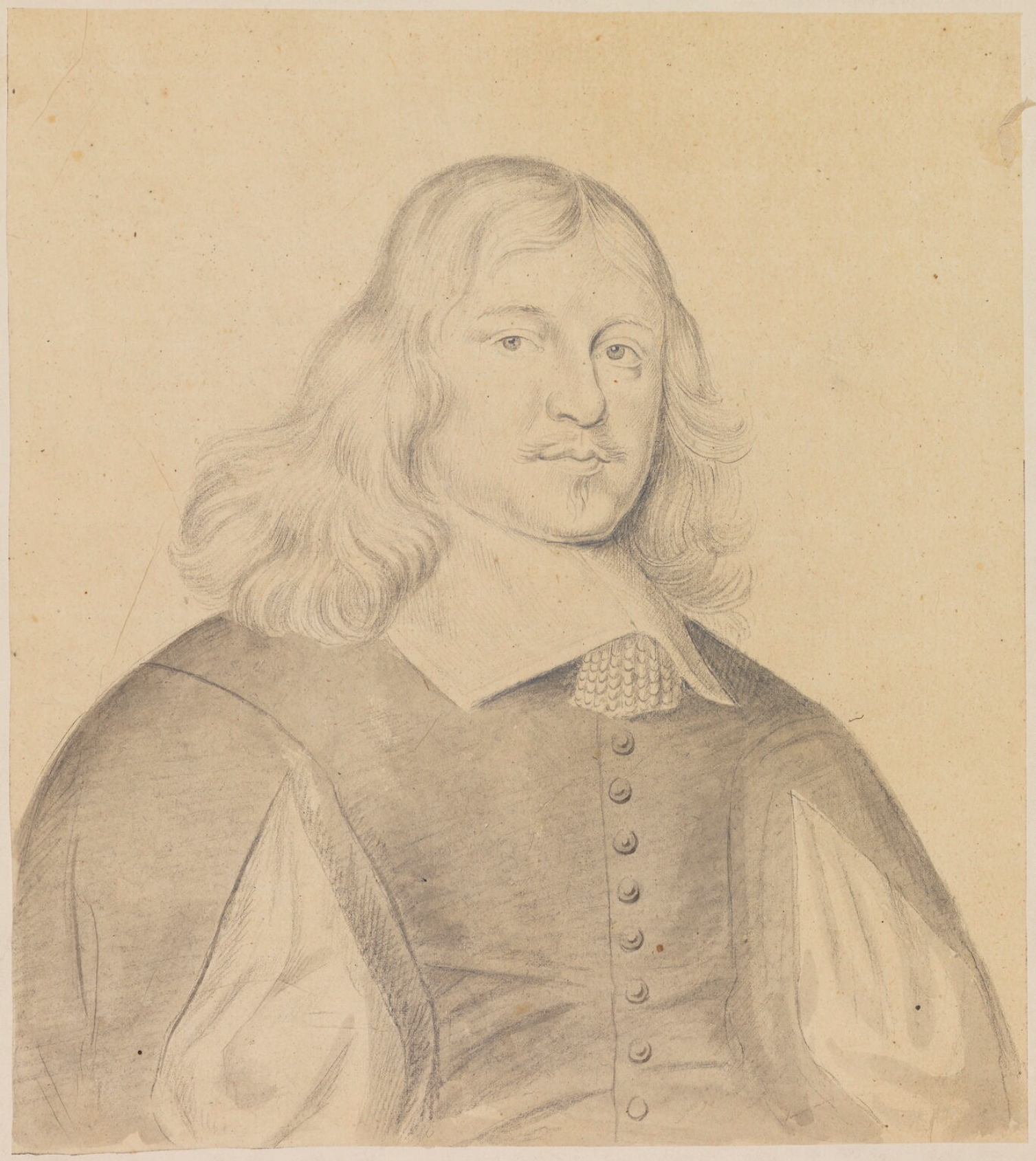
John Bradshaw (Cheshire)

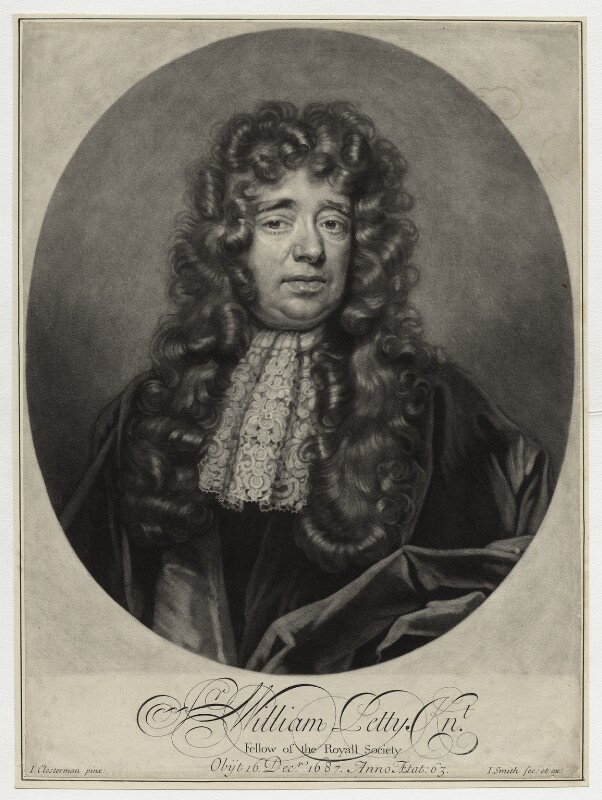
Sir William Petty (Westlow)

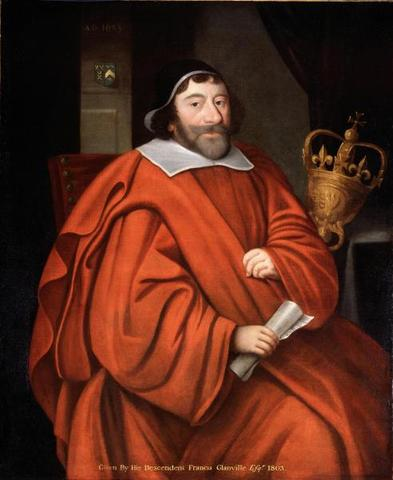
Sir John Glanville (Newport)

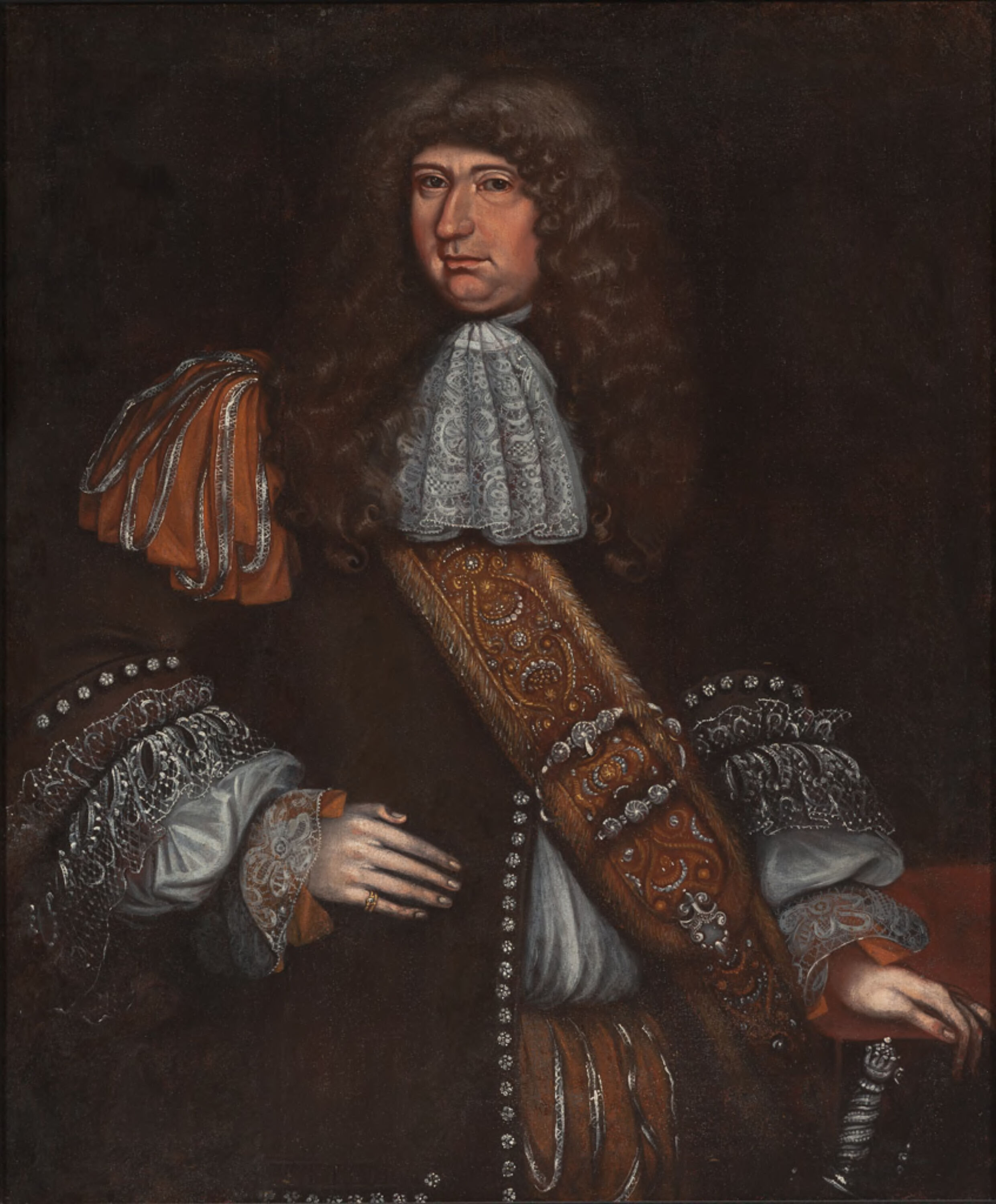
Sir George Downing (Carlisle)

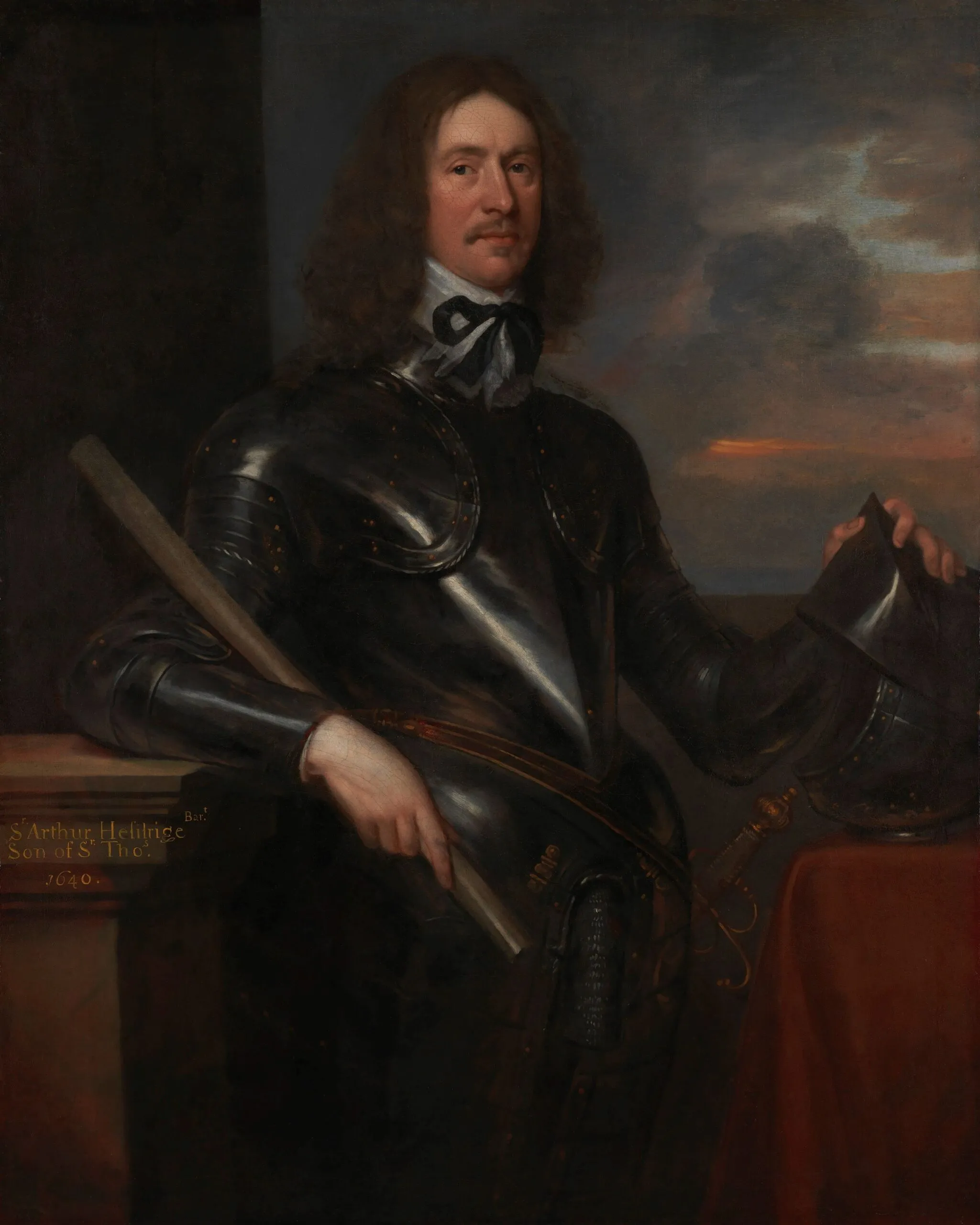
Sir Arthur Hesilrige (Leicester)

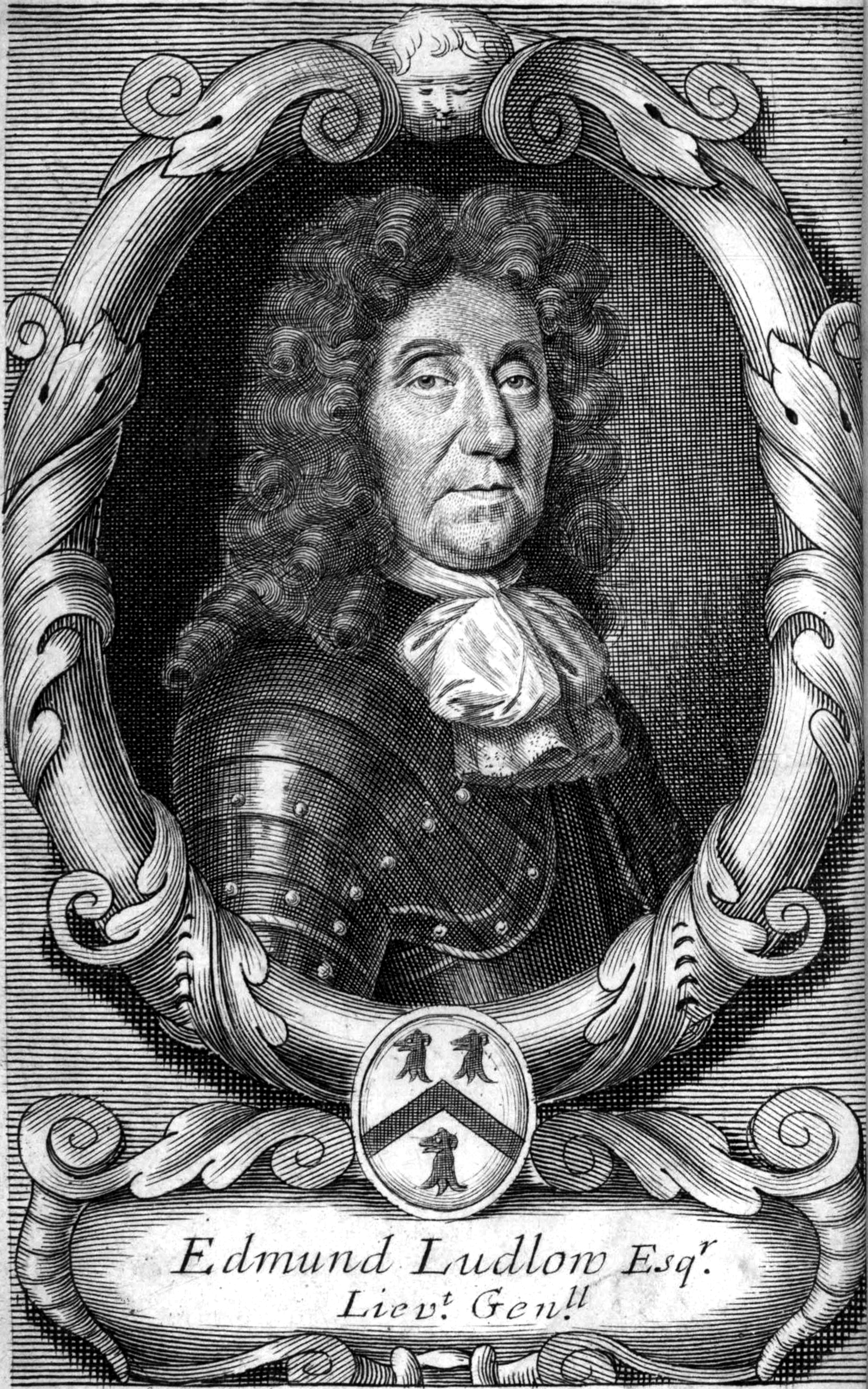
Edmund Ludlow (Hindon)

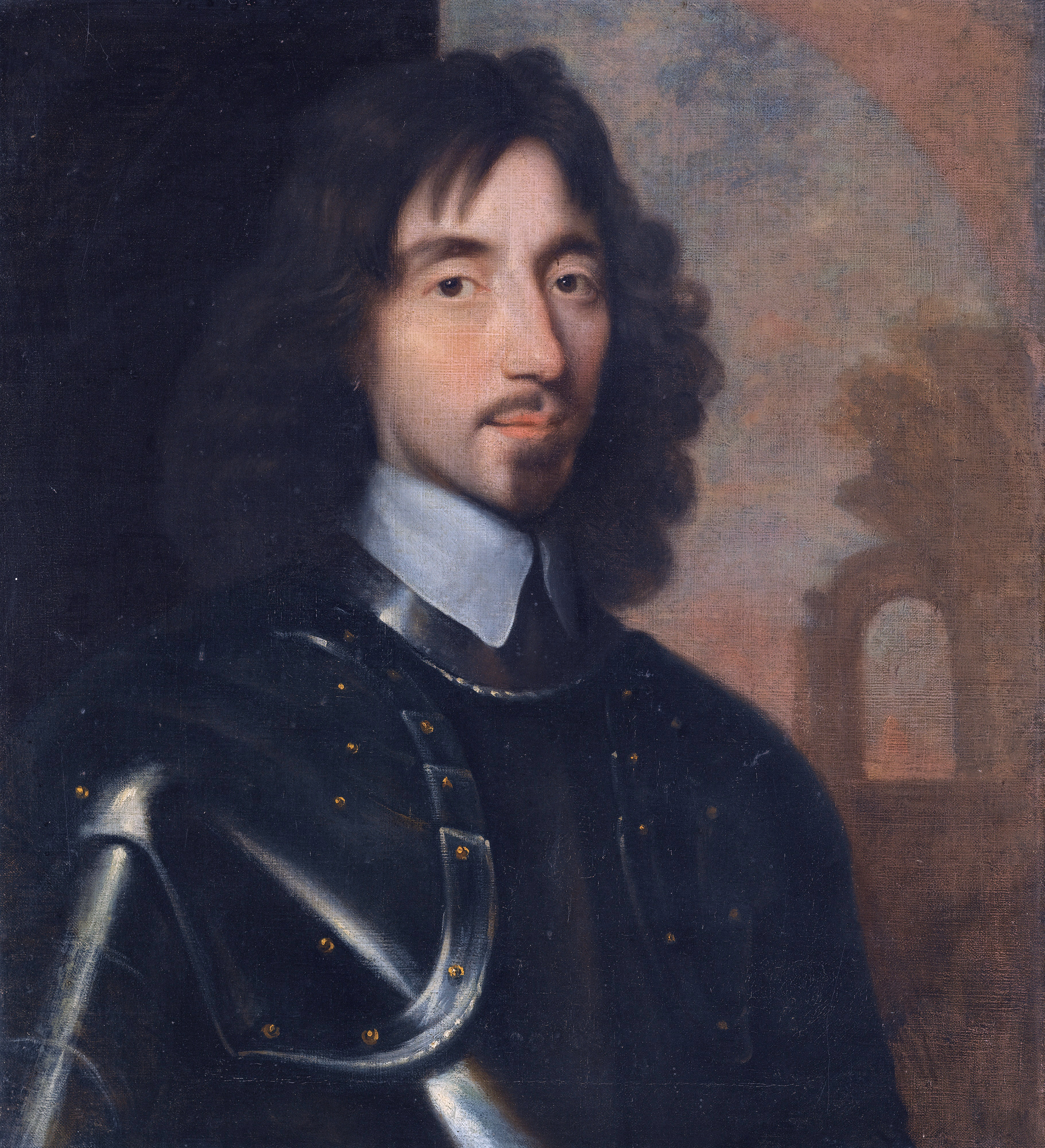
Thomas Fairfax (Yorkshire)

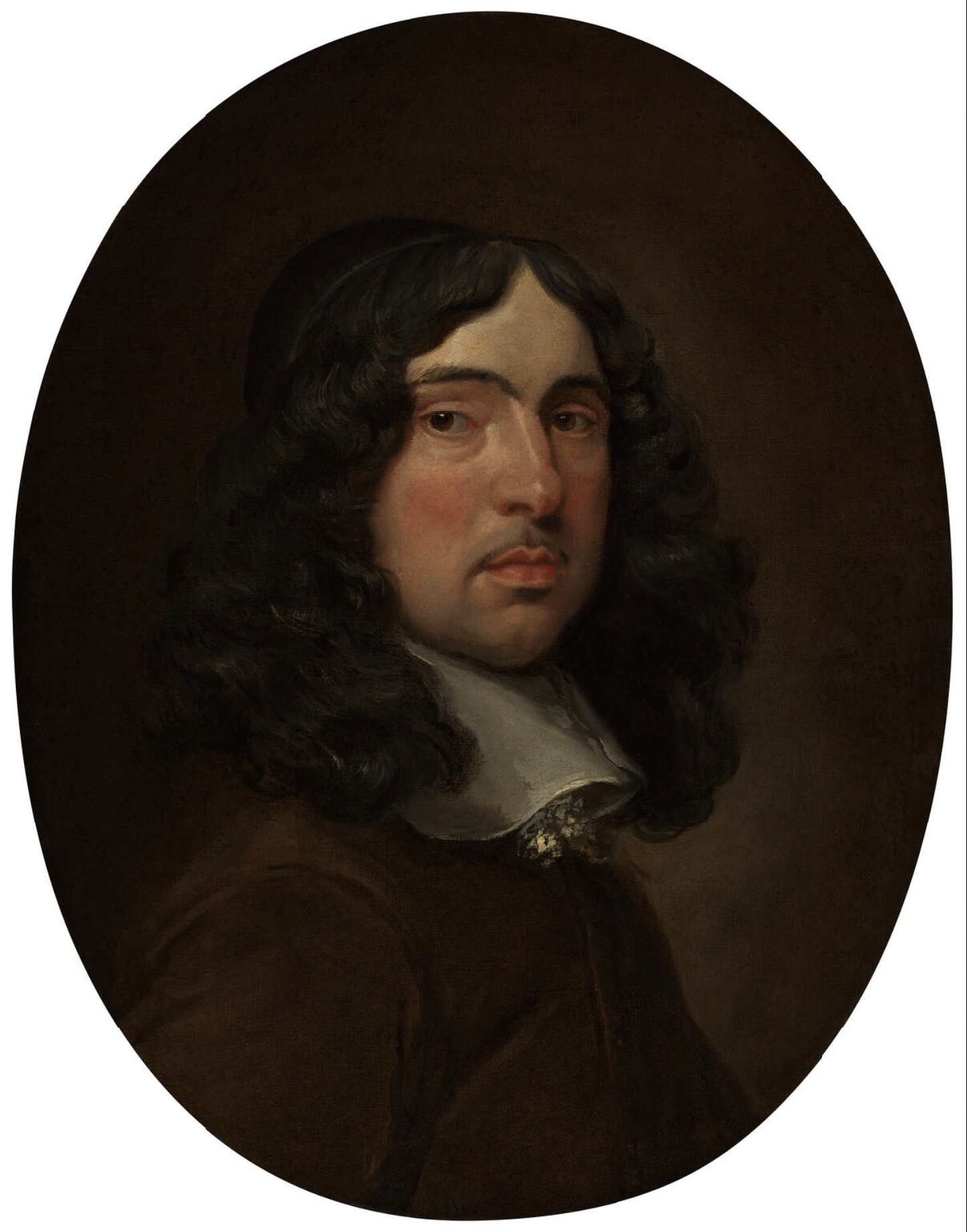
Andrew Marvell (Hull)

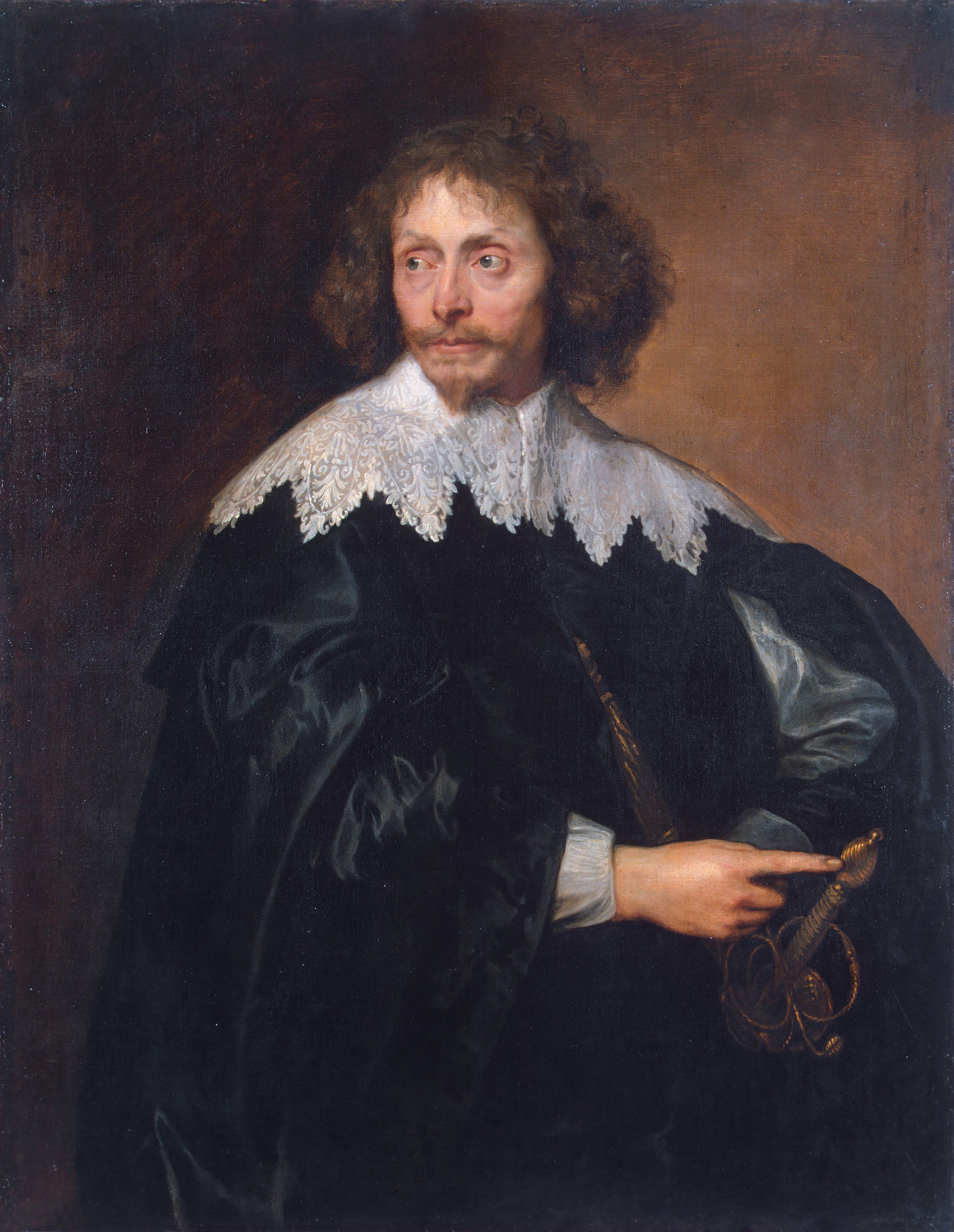
Thomas Chaloner (Scarborough)

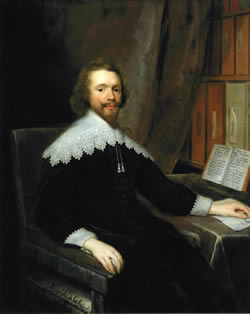
John Bathurst (Richmond)

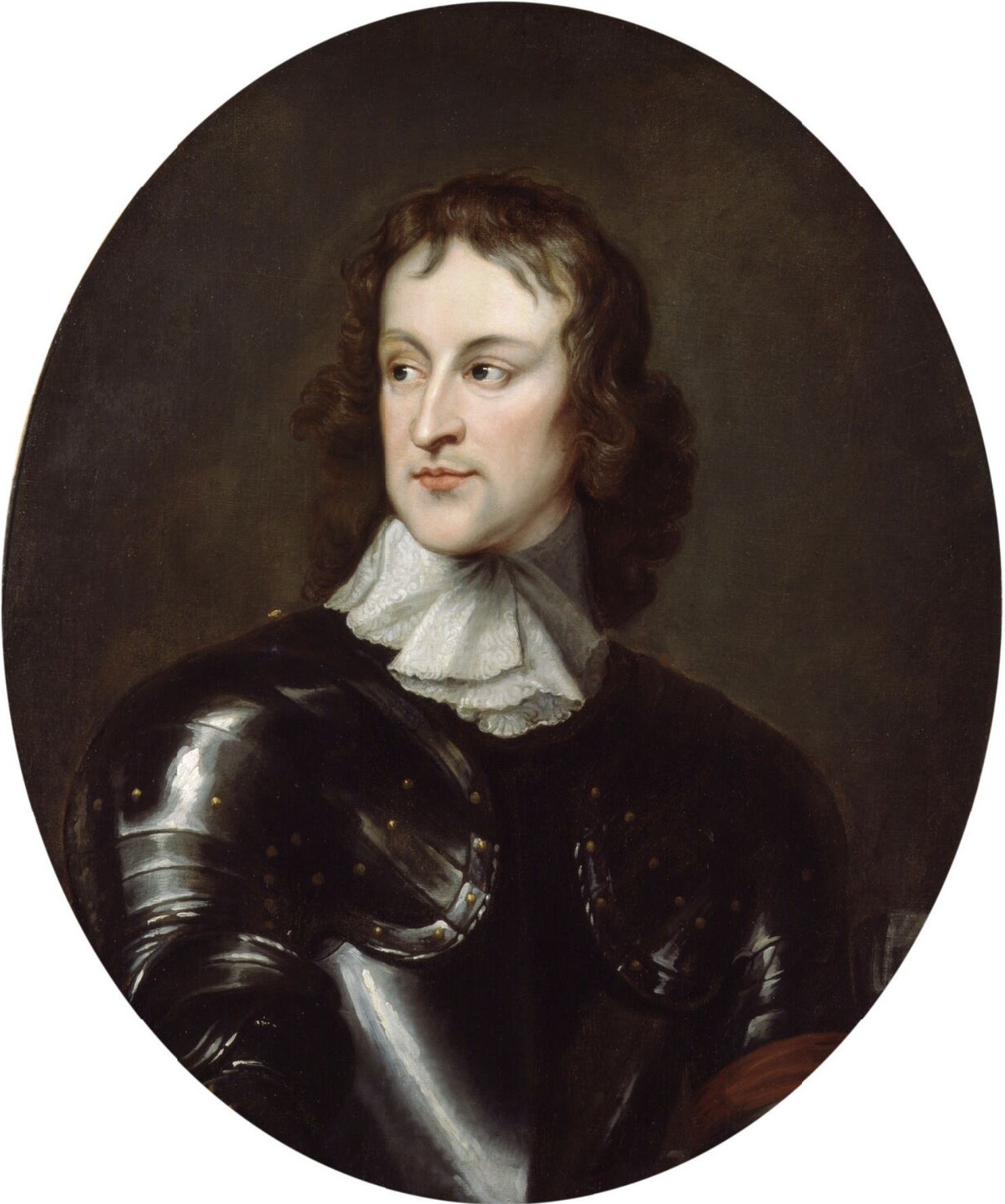
John Lambert (Pontefract)

=== Bedfordshire ===
Constituency	Members	Notes
Bedfordshire	John Okey; Richard Wagstaffe	
Bedford	Samuel Browne; Thomas Margets	
=== Berkshire ===
Constituency	Members	Notes
Berkshire	John Dunch; Sir Robert Pye	
Windsor	George Starkey; Christopher Whichcote	
Reading	Henry Neville; Daniel Blagrave	
Abingdon	Sir John Lenthall Bart	
Wallingford	William Cook; Walter Bigg	
=== Buckinghamshire ===
Constituency	Members	Notes
Buckinghamshire	William Bowyer; Richard Greenville	
Buckingham	Francis Ingoldsby; Sir Richard Temple, 3rd Baronet	
Wycombe	Thomas Scot; Tobias Bridge	
Aylesbury	James Whitelocke; Thomas Tyrrill	
Amersham	Francis Drake; John Biscoe	
Wendover	William Hampden; John Baldwin	
Marlow	Peregrine Hoby; William Borlase	
=== Cambridgeshire ===
Constituency	Members	Notes
Cambridgeshire	Sir Thomas Willys, 1st Baronet; Sir Henry Pickering	
Cambridge University	John Thurloe; Thomas Sclater M D.	
Cambridge	John Lowry; Richard Timbs	
=== Cheshire ===
Constituency	Members	Notes
Cheshire	John Bradshaw; Richard Legh	
City of Chester	Jonathan Ridge (Alderman); John Griffith (Alderman)	
=== Cornwall ===
Constituency	Members	Notes
Cornwall	Hugh Boscawen; Francis Buller jun	
Launceston	Thomas Gewen; Robert Bennett	
Liskeard	Thomas Noell; Hunt Greenwood	
Lostwithiel	Walter Moyle; John Clayton	
Truro	Charles Boscawen; Walter Vincent	
Bodmin	Anthony Nichols; John Silly	Cobbett gives William Turner vice Nichols
Helston	Robert Rous; Thomas Juxon	
Saltash	John Buller; Edmund Prideaux	
Camelford	John Maynard; William Bradden	
Grampound	Thomas Herle; Robert Scawen	
Eastlow	John Buller; John Kendall	
Westlow	William Whitelock (of the Middle-Temple); Dr. William Petty	
Penryn	John Fox; Thomas Ceely	
Tregoney	John Thomas; Edward Boscawen	
Bossiney	Anthony Nicholls (of Penrose); Samuel Trelawney	Cobbett gives Thomas Povey vice Nicholls
St Ives	John St Aubyn; Peter Silly	
Fowey	Edward Herle; John Barton ( of the Middle-Temple)	
St Germans	John Glanville; John St Aubyn	
Mitchel	James Launce; Richard Lobb	
Newport	William Morice; Sir John Glanville	
St Mawes	John Lampen jun. William Tredenham	
Callington	Thomas Carew; Anthony Buller	
=== Cumberland ===
Constituency	Members	Notes
Cumberland	Sir Wilfrid Lawson, 1st Baronet, of Isell; Colonel William Briscoe	
Carlisle	George Downing; Thomas Craister	
Cockermouth	John Stapleton; Wilfrid Lawson	
=== Derbyshire ===
Constituency	Members	Notes
Derbyshire	John Gell; Thomas Sanders	
Derby	Gervase Bennet; John Dalton	
=== Devon ===
Constituency	Members	Notes
Devon	Sir John Northcote, 1st Baronet; Robert Rolle	
Exeter	Thomas Bampfield; Maj. Thomas Gibbon	
Totnes	Capt. John Pleydell; Gilbert Evelyn (Gent)	
Plymouth	Christopher Silly; Timothy Alsop	
Honiton	Sir Walter Yonge, 2nd Baronet; Samuel Serle	
Plympton Erle	Henry Hatsell; Christopher Martyn	
Tavistock	Edmund Fowell; Henry Hatsell	
Clifton Dartmouth Hardness	Thomas Boone; Col. John Clarke	Browne Willis gives Robert Thompson
Bere Alston	John Maynard; Elisha Crymes	
Tiverton	Sir Coplestone Bampfylde, 2nd Baronet; Francis Warner	
Ashburton	Thomas Reynell; Sir John Fowell, 2nd Baronet	
Okehampton	Robert Everland; Edward Wise	
Barnstaple	Sir John Coplestone; George Walters	
=== Dorset ===
Constituency	Members	Notes
Dorset	Sir Walter Earle; John Bingham	
Poole	Col. John Fitzjames; Samuel Bond	
Corfe Castle	Sir Ralph Banks; John Tregonwell	
Dorchester	James Gould; John Bushrode	
Lyme Regis	Edmund Prideaux; Henry Henley	
Bridport	Edward Cheek (of Gabriels); John Lee the elder (Burgess of the Town)	
Shaftesbury	Henry Whitaker; James Baker	
Wareham	Elias Bond; James Dewey	
Weymouth and Melcombe	Col. John Clark; Peter Middleton (Merchant); John Trenchard; Col. Walden Lagoe	
=== Essex ===
Constituency	Members	Notes
Essex	Charles Rich, 4th Earl of Warwick; Edward Turnor	
Colchester	John Shaw; Abraham Johnson (Merchant of the City of London)	Alternative sources -John Maidstone and Abraham Harington
Maldon	Henry Mildmay; Joachim Matthews	
Harwich	John Sicklemore; Thomas King (Gent)	
=== Gloucestershire ===
Constituency	Members	Notes
Gloucestershire	John Grobham Howe; John Stephens	
Gloucester	James Stephens; Laurence Singleton	
Cirencester	John Stone; Richard Southby	
Tewkesbury	Edward Cooke; Robert Long	
=== Hampshire ===
Constituency	Members	Notes
Hampshire	Robert Wallop; Richard Norton	
Winchester	John Hildesley; Nicholas Love	
Southampton	Thomas Knollys; Roger Gallop	
Portsmouth	Francis Willoughby; John Child	
Yarmouth	John Sadler; Richard Lucy	
Petersfield	Sir Henry Norton, 2nd Baronet; Sir Josias Child, 1st Baronet	
Newport al. Medina	Thomas Boreman (of Broke); Sir Robert Dillington, 2nd Baronet	
Stockbridge	Francis Rivett; Richard Whitehead jun	
Newtown	William Laurence; John Maynard	
Christchurch	John Bulkeley; Henry Tulse	
Whitchurch	Sir Henry Vane; Robert Reynolds	
Lymington	John Button jun. Richard Whitehead jun.	
Andover	Gabriel Beck (of Westminster); Robert Gough (of Vernames Dean)	
=== Herefordshire ===
Constituency	Members	Notes
Herefordshire	Wroth Rogers; Sir Bennet Hoskyns, 1st Baronet	
Hereford	Nathan Rogers; Roger Bosworth M. D	
Weobley	Herbert Perrott; Robert Andrews	
Leominster	John Birch; Edward Freeman	
=== Hertfordshire ===
Constituency	Members	Notes
Hertfordshire	Rowland Lytton; Richard Galston (of Widiall)	
St Albans	Richard Jennings; Alban Cox	
Hertford	Isaac Pulter; James Cowper	Browne Willis gives William Packer
=== Huntingdonshire ===
Constituency	Members	Notes
Huntingdonshire	Henry Cromwell-Williams; Nicholas Pedley	
Huntingdon	John Thurloe; Sir John Bernard	
=== Kent (see also Cinque Ports) ===
Constituency	Members	Notes
Kent	Robert James; Sir Thomas Style, 2nd Baronet	
Canterbury	Thomas St Nicholas; Robert Gibbon	
Rochester	Richard Hutchinson; Peter Pett	
Maidstone	Andrew Broughton; Sir John Banks, 1st Baronet	
Queenborough	James Herbert; Thomas Bayles	
=== Lancashire ===
Constituency	Members	Notes
Lancashire	Sir George Booth Bt; Alexander Rigby	
Lancaster	Col. William West; Henry Porter	
Preston	Col. Richard Shuttleworth; Col. Richard Standish	
Newton	William Brereton, 3rd Baron Brereton; Peter Legh	
Wigan	Hugh Forth; Robert Markland	
Liverpool	Col. Gilbert Ireland; Thomas Blackmore	
=== Leicestershire ===
Constituency	Members	Notes
Leicestershire	Sir Thomas Beaumont, 1st Baronet; Francis Hacker	
Leicester	Sir Arthur Hesilrige, 2nd Baronet; William Stanley (Aldermen)	
=== Lincolnshire ===
Constituency	Members	Notes
Lincolnshire	Edward Rossiter; Thomas Hatcher	
Lincoln	Robert Marshal (Alderman); Thomas Meres	
Boston	Sir Anthony Irby; Francis Mussenden	
Grimsby	William Wray; Edward Ayscough	
Stamford	John Weaver; Christopher Clapham	
Grantham	William Ellys; Sir Thomas Skipwith, 1st Baronet	
=== Middlesex ===
Constituency	Members	Notes
Middlesex	Chaloner Chute; Sir Francis Gerard, 2nd Baronet	
Westminster	Richard Sherwyn; Edward Grosvenor	
City of London	William Thompson; Sir Theophilus Biddulph, 1st Baronet; John Jones; Sir Richard Browne, 1st Baronet of London	
=== Monmouthshire ===
Constituency	Members	Notes
Monmouthshire	William Morgan; John Nicholas	
Monmouth	Nathaniel Waterhouse	
=== Norfolk ===
Constituency	Members	Notes
Norfolk	Sir Horatio Townshend; Sir William D'Oyly, 1st Baronet	
Norwich	William Barnham; John Hobart	
King's Lynn	Thomas Toll; Capt. Griffith Lloyd	
Yarmouth	Charles George Cook; William Burton	
Thetford	William Stene MD; Robert Steward	
Castle Rising	John Fielder (of London); Gaybon Goddard (of Kings-Lynn)	
=== Northamptonshire ===
Constituency	Members	Notes
Northamptonshire	Richard Knightley; Philip Holman sen	
Peterborough	Francis St John; Col. Alexander Blake	
Northampton	Francis Harvey; Sir James Langham, 2nd Baronet	
Brackley	Thomas Crew; William Lisle	
Higham Ferrars	James Nutley	Another source gives Ralph Suckley
=== Northumberland ===
Constituency	Members	Notes
Northumberland	Sir William Fenwick, 2nd Baronet; Sir Ralph Delaval, 1st Baronet	
Newcastle	Mark Shaftoe (of Newcastle); Thomas Lilburne	
Berwick upon Tweed	John Rushworth; George Payler (one of the Commissioners of the Navy)	
Morpeth	Robert Delaval; Robert Mitford	
=== Nottinghamshire ===
Constituency	Members	Notes
Nottinghamshire	Edward Neville; Thomas Bristow	
Nottingham	John Whalley; John Parker (Alderman)	
East Retford	Clifford Clifton; William Cartwright	
=== Oxfordshire ===
Constituency	Members	Notes
Oxfordshire	Sir Robert Jenkinson, 1st Baronet; Henry Cary, 4th Viscount Falkland	+Sir Francis Norris
Oxford University	Matthew Hale; John Mylles	
Oxford	Richard Croke; Unton Croke	
Woodstock	Sir Jerome Sankey; Miles Fleetwood	
Banbury	Nathaniel Fiennes, the younger	
=== Rutland ===
Constituency	Members	Notes
Rutland	William Shield; Edward Horseman	
=== Salop ===
Constituency	Members	Notes
Shropshire	Thomas Mackworth; Philip Young (of Kemton)	
Shrewsbury	William Jones (Recorder); Humphrey Mackworth (Governor and Town Clerk)	
Bridgnorth	Edmund Waring; John Humphrys	
Ludlow	Job Charlton; Samuel Baldwyn	
Wenlock	Thomas Whitmore; Sir Francis Lawley, 2nd Baronet	
Bishops Castle	Samuel More; William Oakeley	
=== Somerset ===
Constituency	Members	Notes
Somerset	John Buckland; Robert Hunt	
Bristol	Robert Aldworth; Joseph Jackson	
Bath	James Ashe; John Harrington	
Wells	Lislebone Long; Thomas White	
Taunton	Sir William Wyndham, 1st Baronet; Thomas Gorges	
Bridgwater	Sir Thomas Wroth; John Wroth	
Minehead	Alexander Popham; Richard Hutchinson	
Ilchester	Richard Jones; John Barker	
Milborne Port	William Carent; Robert Hunt	
=== Staffordshire ===
Constituency	Members	Notes
Staffordshire	Thomas Crompton; Sir Thomas Whitgrave.	
Stafford	Martin Noell; William Jessop	
Newcastle under Lyme	Samuel Terrick; Sir John Merrick	Cobbett gives Maj. Gen. Tobias Bridge and Edward Keeling
Lichfield	Daniel Watson; Thomas Minors	
Tamworth	Maj. Gen. Tobias Bridge; Edward Keeling	Cobbett gives John Swinfen and Captain Thomas
=== Suffolk ===
Constituency	Members	Notes
Suffolk	Sir Henry Felton, 2nd Baronet; Sir Thomas Barnardiston, 1st Baronet	
Ipswich	Nathaniel Bacon; Francis Bacon	
Dunwich	Robert Brewster; John Barrington	
Orford	Thomas Edger; Jeremy Copping	
Aldeburgh	Laurence Oxburgh; John Bence	
Sudbury	Samuel Hassel; John Fothergill	
Eye	Edward Dendy; Joseph Blisset	Cobbett gives Thomas Chaplin
Bury St Edmunds	John Clarke; Thomas Chaplin	
=== Surrey ===
Constituency	Members	Notes
Surrey	Sir Arthur Onslow, 1st Baronet; Francis Drake	
Southwark	George Thomson; Andrew Brewer	
Bletchingly	John Goodwin; Edmund Hoskins	
Reigate	John Hele; Edward Thurland	
Guildford	Carew Raleigh; Robert Parkhurst	
Gatton	Thomas Turgis; Edward Bishe	Cobbett gives name as Thomas Sturges
Haslemere	Henry Fitzjames; John Flook of Bramshot	
=== Sussex ===
Constituency	Members	Notes
Sussex	Herbert Morley; John Fagg	
Chichester	Henry Peckham; William Cawley	
Horsham	William Freeman; Henry Chowne	Other source gives John Fagg
Midhurst	Benjamin Weston; William Yalden jun.	Other source gives John Humfrey
Lewes	Herbert Morley; Richard Boughton	
New Shoreham	Edward Blaker; John Whaley	
Bramber	John Fagg; John Byne	
Steyning	Sir John Trevor; Sir Anthony Shirley, 1st Baronet	
East Grinstead	Robert Goodwin; George Courthope	
Arundel	Henry Onslow (of Slinfold); Richard Marriot (of London)	
=== Warwickshire ===
Constituency	Members	Notes
Warwickshire	Richard Lucy; Joseph Hawkesworth	
Coventry	Robert Beake; William Purefoy	
Warwick	Fulke Lucy; Thomas Archer	
=== Westmorland ===
Constituency	Members	Notes
Westmoreland	Thomas Burton; Thomas Wharton	
Appleby	Adam Baynes; Nathaniel Redding	
=== Wiltshire ===
Constituency	Members	Notes
Wiltshire	Sir Walter St John, 3rd Baronet; Sir Anthony Ashley Cooper	
Salisbury	Henry Eyre; Humphry Ditton sen. (Alderman)	
Wilton	John Herbert; Richard Howe	
Downton	Thomas Fitzjames; William Coles	
Hindon	Edmund Ludlow; Edward Tooker	
Heytesbury	John Ashe; Samuel Ashe	
Westbury	Robert Danvers; William Eyre of Neston	
Calne	Edward Bayntun; William Duckett	
Devizes	Chaloner Chute jun. Edward Scotton	
Chippenham	Edward Hungerford; James Stedman (of Lincolns-Inn)	
Malmesbury	Sir Henry Lee (of Ditchley Oxford); Thomas Higgons (of Grewel Southampton)	
Cricklade	Edward Poole; John Hawkins	
Great Bedwyn	Henry Hungerford; Thomas Manley	
Ludgershall	James Davy (of the Middle-Temple); Richard Sherwyn (of the City of Westminster)	
Old Sarum	Richard Hill (of Stratford); William Ludlow (of Clarendon) Park)	
Wootton Bassett	Henry St John of Lydiard Tregoze; Robert Stevens (of the Middle-Temple)	
Marlborough	Thomas Grove; James Hayes	
=== Worcestershire ===
Constituency	Members	Notes
Worcestershire	Nicholas Lechmere; Thomas Foley	
Worcester	William Collins; Thomas Street	
Droitwich	John Wilde; Edward Salwey (of Stamford)	
Evesham	Theophilus Andrews; Robert Atkyns	
Bewdley	Edward Pytts	
=== Yorkshire ===
Constituency	Members	Notes
Yorkshire	Thomas Lord Fairfax; Thomas Harrison	
York	Sir Thomas Dickenson; Christopher Topham	
Kingston upon Hull	John Ramsden; Andrew Marvell	
Knaresborough	Slingsby Bethel; Robert Walters	
Scarborough	Thomas Chalenor; Edward Salmon	
Ripon	Edmund Jennings; Jonathan Jennings	
Richmond	Sir Christopher Wyvill, 3rd Baronet; John Bathurst	
Hedon	Sir Thomas Strickland, 2nd Baronet; Matthew Alured	
Boroughbridge	Robert Stapylton; Laurence Parsons	
Thirsk	Col. Thomas Talbot; Maj. Gen. Goodrick	
Aldborough	John Lambert; Francis Goodricke	
Beverley	Sir Thomas Strickland, 2nd Baronet; John Anlaby	
Pontefract	John Lambert; John Hewley	
Malton	Philip Howard; Sir George Marwood, 1st Baronet	Double return also Luke Robinson and Robert Lilburne
Northallerton	George Smithson; James Danby	
=== Cinque Ports ===
Hastings	Samuel Gott; Nicholas Delves	
Romney	Sir Robert Honywood; Lambert Godfrey	
Hythe	Sir Robert Hales, 1st Baronet; William Kenrick	
Dover	John Dixwell; Thomas Kelsey	
Sandwich	Sir Richard Meredith, 2nd Baronet; James Thurbarne	
Seaford	William Spence; George Parker	
Rye	William Hay; Mark Thomas	
Winchelsea	John Busbridge; Robert Fowle	
=== Wales ===
Constituency	Members	Notes
Anglesey	Col. George Twisleton	
Beaumaris	Griffith Bodwrda	
Brecknockshire	Edmund Jones (Attorney-General for South Wales)	
Brecknock	Samuel Wightwick	
Cardiganshire	James Philipps	
Cardigan	Roland Dawkins	
Carmarthenshire	Thomas Hughes	
Carmarthen	David Morgan	Browne Wilis gives Rowland Dawkins
Carnarvonshire	Sir William Glynne, 1st Baronet	
Carnarvon	Robert Williams	
Denbighshire	Sir John Carter	
Denbigh	John Manley of Bryny	
Flintshire	John Trevor	
Flint	Sir John Hanmer, 3rd Baronet	
Glamorgan	Evan Seys	
Cardiff	John Price	
Swansea	William Foxwist	
Merioneth	Lewis Owen	
Montgomeryshire	Edward Vaughan	
Montgomery	Sir Charles Lloyd, 1st Baronet, of Garth	
Pembrokeshire	Sir Erasmus Philipps, 3rd Baronet	
Pembroke	Sampson Lort; Arthur Owen	
Haverford West	John Upton	
Radnorshire	Henry Williams	
Radnor	Robert Weaver	
=== Scotland ===
Constituency	Members	Notes
Sheriffdoms of Ross, Sutherland, and Cromarty	Ralph Knight	
Sheriffdom of Inverness	Coll. Thomas Fitch.	
Sheriffdom of Banff	William Wheler	
Sheriffdom of Aberdeen	Archibald Marquis of Argyle	
Sheriffdoms of Forfar and Kinkardine		
Sheriffdoms of Fife and Kinross	Sir Alexander Gibson.	
Sheriffdom of Perth	Sir Edward Rodes, one of his Highness's Council in Scotland.	
Sheriffdoms of Linlithgow, Sterling, and Clackmannan	Col. Adrian Scrope, one of his Highness's Council.	
Sheriffdoms of Dunbarton, Argyll, and Bute	William Stane	
Sheriffdoms of Aire and Renfrew		
Sheriffdom of Lannerick	George Lockhart his Highness's Advocate.	
Sheriffdom of Midlothian	Samuel Desbrow, Chancellor and Keeper of the Great Seal of Scotland	
Sheriffdom of Merse	John Swinton of Swinton, one of his Highness's Council	
Sheriffdom of Roxborough	Sir Andrew Ker of Cremhiel, Kt	
Sheriffdoms of Selkirk and Peebles	Archibald Murrey,	
Sheriffdom of Dumfries		
Sheriffdom of Wigton	Sir James Mac Dowal of Carchland.	
Sheriffdom of East-Lothian	John Earl of Tweedale	
Boroughs of Donnobb, Tayn, Inverness, Dingwell, Nairn, Elgin, and Farras		
Boroughs of Banff and Cullen, and Aberdeen	Dr. Thomas Clarges	
Boroughs of Forfar, Dundee, Arbroth, Montross, Brechin	Laurence Oxborow	
Boroughs of Lithgow, Queens Ferry, Perth, Culross, and Stirling	Thomas Waller of Grays-Inn.	
Boroughs of St. Andrews, Dysart, Kirkaldy, Anstruther-East, Pittenween, Creel, Dumfermline, Kinghorn, Anstruther-West, Innerleithing, Kilkenny, and Burnt-land	Nathaniel Whetham	
City of Edinburgh	John Thompson Auditor General for Scotland	
Boroughs of Lannerick, Glasgow, Rutherglen, Rothsay, Renfrew, Ayre, Irwynn, and Dunbarton	John Lockhart	
Boroughs of Dumfreize, Sanclare, Lochmaben, Annand, Wigton, Kirkudbright, Whithorn, and Galloway	Jeremiah Tolhurst	
Boroughs of Peebles, Selkirk, Jedburgh, Lauder, North Berwick, Dunbar, and Haddington	Dr. Thomas Clarges	
=== Ireland ===
Constituency	Members	Notes
Counties of Meath and Louth	Sir Anthony Morgan; William Aston	
Counties of Kildare and Wicklow	Dudley Loftus; Henry Markham	
County of Dublin	Sir Theophilus Jones.	
City of Dublin	Arthur Annesley	
Counties of Carlow, Wexford, Kilkenny, and Queen's County	Daniel Redmond; John Brett	
Counties of Westmeath, Longford, and King's County	Francis Lord Aungier; Sir Henry Piers	
Counties of Down, Antrim, and Armagh	Sir John Scevington; George Rawden	
Towns of Carrickfergus and Belfast	John Duckenfield	
Counties of Londonderry, Donegal, and Tyrone	Colonel John Gorges; Alexander Staples	
Towns of Derry and Coleraine	Ralph King	
Counties of Cavan, Fermanagh, and Monaghan	Thomas Coote	
Counties of Kerry, Limerick, and Clare	Major Gen. Sir Hardress Waller; Sir Henry Ingoldsby, 1st Baronet	
City and County of the City of Limerick and Kilmallock	George Ingoldsby	
County of Cork	Sir Maurice Fenton	
Towns of Cork and Youghal	Francis Fowlkes .	
Towns of Bandon and Kinsale	Vincent Gookin	
Counties of Tipperary and Waterford	Sir Jerome Sankey; Thomas Stanley	
Cities of Waterford and Clonmel	William Halsey	
Counties of Sligo, Roscommon, and Leitrim	Robert Parke; Thomas Waller	
Counties of Galway and Mayo	Sir Charles Coote, Commissary-General; Col. Thomas Sadler	

== See also ==
- List of MPs elected to the English parliament in 1654 (First Protectorate Parliament)
- List of MPs elected to the English parliament in 1656 (Second Protectorate Parliament)
- List of parliaments of England
- Third Protectorate Parliament
