= Lort =

Lort may refer to:

== People ==
- George Lort Phillips (1811–1866), British politician
- John Lort Stokes (1811–1885), British navy officer
- John Lort-Williams (1881–1966), British politician
- Lort baronets of Stackpoole Court, United Kingdom
- Michael Lort (1725–1790), British clergyman, academic and antiquary
- Sampson Lort, British politician
- Sir Roger Lort, 1st Baronet (1607/8–1664), British poet
- William Lort Mansel (1753–1820), British churchman

== Places ==
- Lort Burn, United Kingdom
- Lort River, Australia

== Other ==
- League of Resident Theatres
