= Rowland Dawkins =

Welsh military colonel and politician (died 1691)

Rowland Dawkins (died 1691) was a Welsh military colonel and politician who sat in the House of Commons at various times between 1654 and 1656. He was a zealous supporter of the Commonwealth.

== Biography ==
Dawkins was the son of George Dawkins of Clivrough and his wife Elizabeth Glyn, daughter of William Glyn of Glynonvawr, Carmarthenshire. He became a colonel in the Commonwealth army and was governor of Carmarthen and Tenby in 1650. In 1651, he suppressed a rising at Llanbadarn. He was appointed to the High Court of Justice on 25 June 1651 and became a Military Commissioner for South Wales on 14 March 1654.

In 1654, Dawkins was elected Member of Parliament for Carmarthenshire in the First Protectorate Parliament. In 1654, and subsequent years he petitioned for the abatement of the assessment for Cardiganshire. He became an alderman of Swansea in 1655. On 27 November 1655, he was ordered with Jenkin Lloyd, Arthur Owen, Sampson Lort, James Philipps and others to examine the petition of the well-affected of Haverfordwest regarding the election of a malignant to office. He was re-elected MP for Carmarthenshire in 1656 for the Second Protectorate Parliament. He commanded militia troops in Pembrokeshire, Carmarthenshire and Cardiganshire until 13 July 1659. In 1659, he was elected MP for Carmarthen and Cardigan in the Third Protectorate Parliament but was unseated for Carmarthen and served only for Cardigan. He was in command of troops at Tenby in 1679.

Dawkins died in 1691 and was buried in the chancel of Penmark Church.

Dawkins was married to Mary Bowen, daughter of George Bowen of Lovegrove, Cardiganshire.

Parliament of England
Preceded by Not represented in Barebones Parliament	Member of Parliament for Carmarthenshire; 1654–1656; With: John Claypole 1654–1656; Robert Atkyns 1656	Succeeded by Thomas Hughes
Preceded by Not represented in Second Protectorate Parliament	Member of Parliament for Carmarthen; 1659	Succeeded by David Morgan
Preceded by Not represented in Second Protectorate Parliament	Member of Parliament for Cardigan; 1659	Succeeded by James Philipps
