= Dundee Burghs (Commonwealth Parliament constituency) =

- Former constituency for the Protectorate Parliament
- Region: Scotland

Former constituency
- Created: 1654
- Abolished: 1659
- Created from: Scotland
- Replaced by: Forfar; Dundee; Arbroath; Montrose; Brechin

During the Commonwealth of England, Scotland and Ireland, called the Protectorate, the Scottish burghs of Forfar, Dundee, Arbroath, Montrose and Brechin were jointly represented by one Member of Parliament in the House of Commons at Westminster from 1654 until 1659. Elections were held at Dundee.

== List of Members of Parliament ==
- Sir Alexander Wedderburn 1654–1658
- Laurence Oxburgh 1659
