= Bussy Mansell =

Bussy Mansel or Bussy Mansell may refer to:

- Bussy Mansell (1623–1699)
- Bussy Mansel, 4th Baron Mansel (died 1750), Welsh peer, MP for Cardiff 1727–34, for Glamorganshire 1737–45
