= Arthur Owen =

Arthur Owen may refer to:

- Arthur Owen (racing driver) (1915–2002), British racing driver
- Arthur Owen (MP) (c. 1608–1678), Welsh politician
- Sir Arthur Owen, 3rd Baronet (c. 1674–1753), Welsh politician

== See also ==
- Owen Arthur (born 1949), Barbadian politician
