= Ayr and Renfrew (Commonwealth Parliament constituency) =

- Former constituency for the Protectorate Parliament
- Region: Scotland

Former constituency
- Created: 1654
- Abolished: 1659
- Created from: Scotland
- Replaced by: Ayrshire; Renfrewshire

During the Commonwealth of England, Scotland and Ireland, called the Protectorate, the Scottish sheriffdoms of Ayr and Renfrew were jointly represented by one Member of Parliament in the House of Commons at Westminster from 1654 until 1659.

== List of Members of Parliament ==
Year	MP
1656	William Lord Cochrane of Dundonald.
1659	
