= Glasgow Burghs (Commonwealth Parliament constituency) =

- Former constituency for the Protectorate Parliament
- Region: Scotland

Former constituency
- Created: 1654
- Abolished: 1659
- Created from: Scotland
- Replaced by: Lanark; Glasgow; Rutherglen; Rothesay; Renfrew; Ayr; Irvine; Dunbarton

During the Commonwealth of England, Scotland and Ireland, called the Protectorate, the Scottish burghs of Lanark, Glasgow, Rutherglen, Rothesay, Renfrew, Ayr, Irvine and Dunbarton were jointly represented by one Member of Parliament in the House of Commons at Westminster from 1654 until 1659. Elections were held at Glasgow.

== List of Members of Parliament ==
- First Protectorate Parliament (1654): John Wilk (Note: Wilk or Wilkie depending on source) of Bromhouse
- Second Protectorate Parliament (1656): George Lockhart of Tarbrax
- Third Protectorate Parliament(1658/59): Sir John Lockhart of Castlehill
