= Forfar and Kincardine (Commonwealth Parliament constituency) =

- Former constituency for the Protectorate Parliament
- Region: Scotland

Former constituency
- Created: 1654
- Abolished: 1659
- Created from: Scotland
- Replaced by: Forfarshire; Kincardineshire

During the Commonwealth of England, Scotland and Ireland, called the Protectorate, the Scottish sheriffdoms of Forfar and Kincardine were jointly represented by one Member of Parliament in the House of Commons at Westminster from 1654 until 1659.

== List of Members of Parliament ==
- Colonel David Barclay of Urie represented Kincardine and Forfar 1654–1656
