= Stirling Burghs (Commonwealth Parliament constituency) =

- Former constituency for the Protectorate Parliament
- Region: Scotland

Former constituency
- Created: 1654
- Abolished: 1659
- Created from: Scotland
- Replaced by: Linlithgow; Queensferry; Perth; Culross; Stirling

During the Commonwealth of England, Scotland and Ireland, called the Protectorate, the Scottish burghs of Linlithgow, Queensferry, Perth, Culross, and Stirling were jointly represented by one Member of Parliament in the House of Commons at Westminster from 1654 until 1659. Elections were held at Stirling.

== List of Members of Parliament ==
- 1654: Colonel John Okey
- 1656: Colonel Henry Markham
- 1658/9: Thomas Waller
