= Inverness Burghs (Commonwealth Parliament constituency) =

- Former constituency for the Protectorate Parliament
- Region: Scotland

Former constituency
- Created: 1654
- Abolished: 1659
- Created from: Scotland
- Replaced by: Dornoch, Tain, Inverness, Dingwall, Nairn, Elgin, Forres

During the Commonwealth of England, Scotland and Ireland, called the Protectorate, the Scottish burghs of Dornoch, Tain, Inverness, Dingwall, Nairn, Elgin and Forres were jointly represented by one Member of Parliament in the House of Commons at Westminster from 1654 until 1659. Elections were held at Inverness.

== List of Members of Parliament ==
- 1656–58: Robert Wooseley
