= Selkirk and Peebles (Commonwealth Parliament constituency) =

- Former constituency for the Protectorate Parliament
- Region: Scotland

Former constituency
- Created: 1654
- Abolished: 1659
- Created from: Scotland
- Replaced by: Selkirkshire; Peeblesshire

During the Commonwealth of England, Scotland and Ireland, called the Protectorate, the Scottish sheriffdoms of Selkirk and Peebles were jointly represented by one Member of Parliament in the House of Commons at Westminster from 1654 until 1659. This electoral union was established under the Ordinance for uniting Scotland into one Commonwealth with England (1654), which reduced Scotland's parliamentary representation to just 30 members.

== Historical context ==
- The union reflected Cromwell's administrative reforms that merged traditional Scottish jurisdictions for parliamentary purposes
- These Border sheriffdoms were combined due to their small populations and geographic proximity
- Elections followed the Protectorate's modified electoral procedures, with voting restricted to property-owning males
