= Linlithgow, Stirling and Clackmannan =

- Former constituency for the Protectorate Parliament
- Region: Scotland

Former constituency
- Created: 1654
- Abolished: 1659
- Created from: Scotland
- Replaced by: Linlithgowshire; Stirlingshire; Clackmannanshire

During the Commonwealth of England, Scotland and Ireland, called the Protectorate, the Scottish sheriffdoms of Linlithgow, Stirling and Clackmannan were jointly represented by one Member of Parliament in the House of Commons at Westminster from 1654 until 1659.

== List of Members of Parliament ==
- 1654: Colonel Thomas Read
- 1656: Godfrey Rhodes (Note: This name is spelt Rhodes or Rodes depending on the source)
- 1658/9: Colonel Adrian Scrope
