= Sir Erasmus Philipps, 5th Baronet =

British politician

Sir Erasmus Philipps, 5th Baronet (8 November 1699 – 5 October 1743), of Picton Castle, Pembrokeshire, was a British politician who sat in the House of Commons from 1726 to 1743.

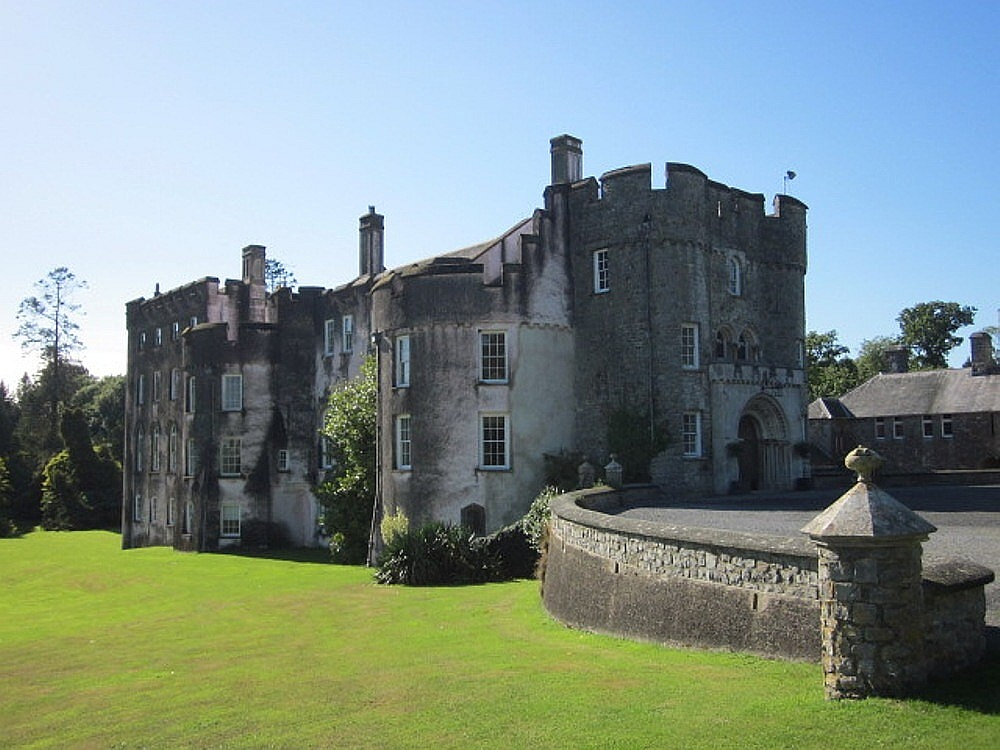
Picton Castle

Philipps was the eldest surviving son of Sir John Philipps, 4th Baronet and his wife Mary Smith, daughter of Anthony Smith, a merchant of the East India Company. He matriculated at Pembroke College, Oxford on 4 August 1720 and was admitted at Lincoln's Inn on 8 August 1721.

Philipps was returned unopposed as Member of Parliament for Haverfordwest on the family interest at a by-election on 8 February 1726 and again at the 1727 British general election. He voted against the Administration in every recorded division. In 1732, he became a trustee of the Georgia Society. At the 1734 British general election, he was returned for Haverfordwest in a contest. He was absent in Italy for the recovery of his health when the vote on the Spanish convention took place in 1739. He was returned again as MP at the 1741 British general election and voted against the Administration on the chairman of the elections committee in December 1741.

Philipps was elected a Fellow of the Royal Society in 1727. He succeeded his father to the baronetcy in 1737.

In 1743 Philipps was drowned in the River Avon on his way home from Bath after his horse was frightened by some pigs. He was unmarried and was succeeded by his younger brother Sir John Philipps, 6th Baronet.

Parliament of Great Britain
Preceded by Francis Edwardes	Member of Parliament for Haverfordwest; 1726–1743	Succeeded by George Barlow
Baronetage of England
Preceded by John Philipps	Baronet (of Picton Castle); 1737–1743	Succeeded by John Philipps
