= Aberdeen Burghs (Commonwealth Parliament constituency) =

- Former constituency for the Protectorate Parliament
- Region: Scotland

Former constituency
- Created: 1654
- Abolished: 1659
- Created from: Scotland
- Replaced by: Banff; Cullen; Aberdeen

During, The Protectorate, Scottish burghs of Banff, Cullen and Aberdeen were jointly represented by one singular Member of Parliament in the House of Commons at Westminster from 1654 until 1659. Although, elections were held only at Aberdeen.

== List of Members of Parliament ==
| Name | From | To | Party/Political Alignment |
|---|---|---|---|
| William Keith of Delny | 1654 | 1659 | Parliamentarian (Note: During the Commonwealth/Protectorate (1653-1659), the Parliament was under Oliver Cromwell's rule and the party system as known later did not exist.) |
| George Keith of Ludquharn | 1654 | 1659 | Parliamentarian |
