= Dunbarton, Argyll and Bute (Commonwealth Parliament constituency) =

- Former constituency for the Protectorate Parliament
- Region: Scotland

Former constituency
- Created: 1654
- Abolished: 1659
- Created from: Scotland
- Replaced by: Dunbartonshire; Argyllshire; Buteshire

During the Commonwealth of England, Scotland and Ireland, called the Protectorate, the Scottish sheriffdoms of Dunbarton, Argyll and Bute were jointly represented by one Member of Parliament in the House of Commons at Westminster from 1654 until 1659.
