= Sir John Philipps, 4th Baronet =

Welsh landowner and politician

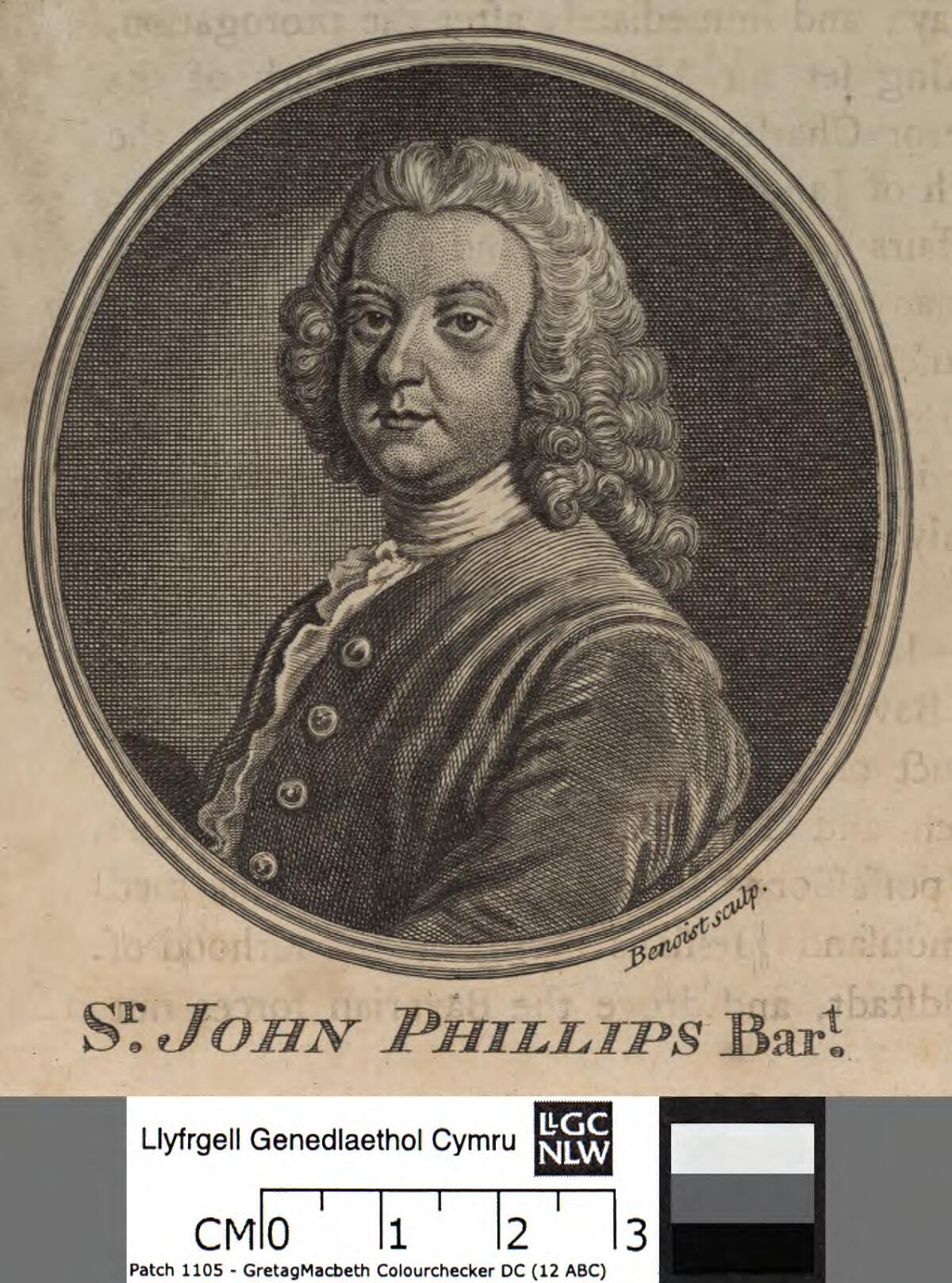
Sir John Philipps

Sir John Philipps (c.1666 – 5 January 1737) of Picton Castle, Pembrokeshire was a Welsh landowner and Tory politician, who sat in the English House of Commons from 1696 to 1703 and in the British House of Commons from 1718 to 1722. He was a philanthropist and major figure of his time in educational and religious reform.

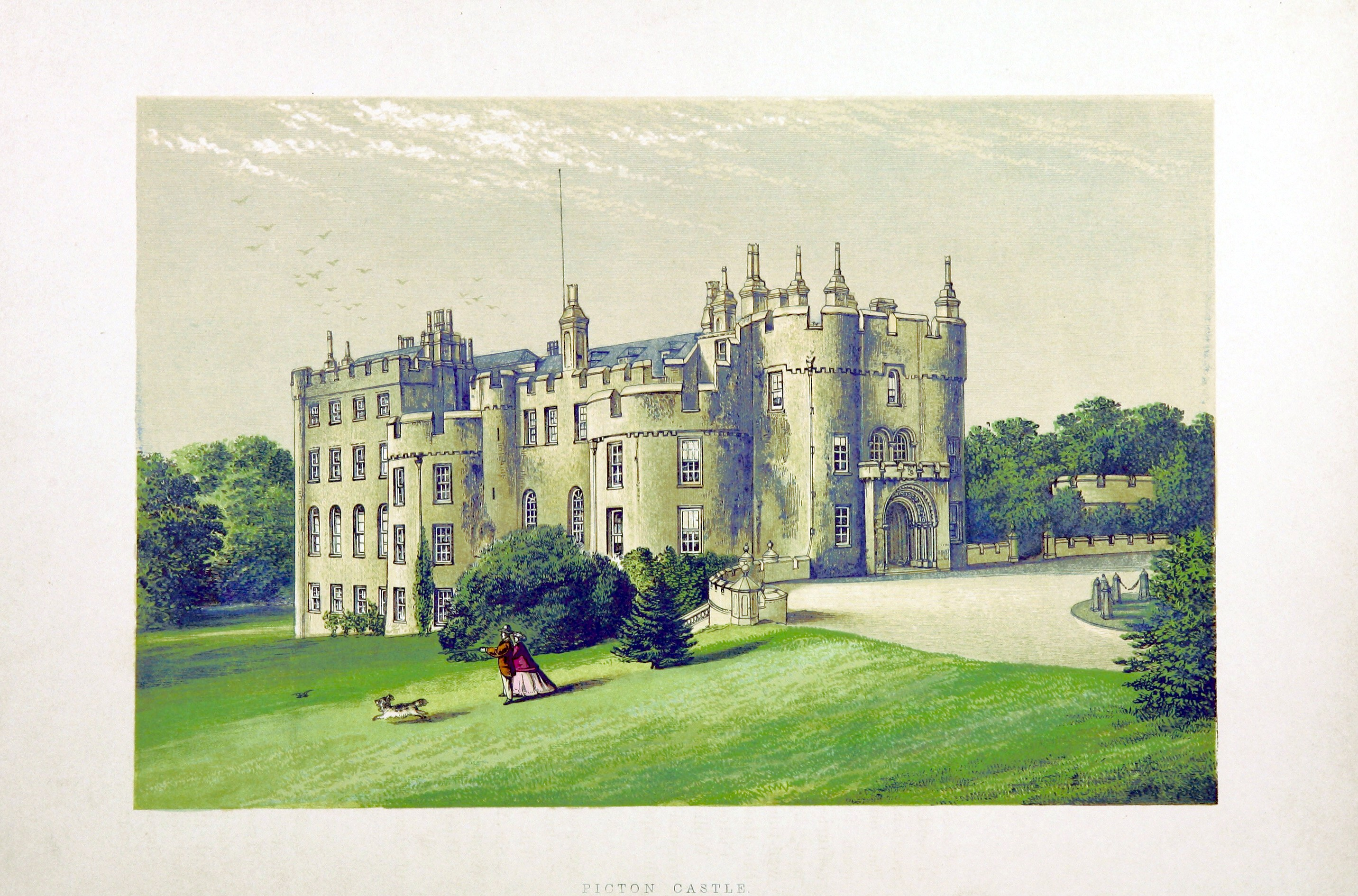
Picton Castle, 1866

Philipps was the eldest surviving son of Sir Erasmus Philipps, 3rd Baronet, by his second wife, Catherine Darcy. He was educated at Westminster School, and was admitted at Trinity College, Cambridge, on 28 June 1682, becoming scholar 1683. He succeeded his father on 18 January 1697 and married Mary Smith (died 1722), daughter of Anthony Smith, an East India merchant of Surat and London, on 12 December 1697.

Philipps was returned unopposed as Member of Parliament for Pembroke Boroughs at the 1695 general election. From a nonconformist background, he spent a great deal of time in Parliament speaking and creating legislation against profaneness, immorality, debauchery and gambling. In 1697, he became Custos Rotulorum of Pembrokeshire on the death of his father. He was returned unopposed again for Pembroke Boroughs at the 1698 general election and at the two general elections in 1701. He withdrew at the 1702 general election, to devote his time to pious works.

Philipps was returned as MP for Haverfordwest on the family interest at a by-election on 4 March 1718. He retired at the 1722 general election on account of poor eyesight.

Philipps became one of the prominent early members of the Society for Promoting Christian Knowledge, and the main promoter of the charity school movement in Wales. He was a patron of George Whitefield and a friend of John Wesley. He was also a patron of Griffith Jones who became his son-in-law, and of two editions of the Welsh Bible. In 1730 he collected several hundred pounds from among his acquaintances for the relief of Polish Protestants who were suffering persecution. He was also a board member of the High Tory Loyal Brotherhood.

Philipps died on 5 January 1737 in a sudden apoplectic fit while sitting at home in Bartlett's Buildings, Holborn, City of London. He was buried on 28 January 1737 at St Mary's Haverfordwest where his epitaph states ‘his constant aim was to promote the cause of virtue and religion’. He had three son and four daughters of whom three children predeceased him. He was succeeded by his eldest son Erasmus. Two of his sons also sat in Parliament.

== Notes ==
Parliament of England
Preceded by Arthur Owen	Member of Parliament for Pembroke Boroughs; 1695–1702	Succeeded by John Meyrick
Parliament of Great Britain
Preceded by John Barlow	Member of Parliament for Haverfordwest; 1718–1722	Succeeded by Francis Edwardes
Baronetage of England
Preceded by Erasmus Philipps	Baronet (of Picton Castle); 1697–1737	Succeeded by Erasmus Philipps
