= Lort baronets =

Title of Baronetage of England from 1662-1698

The Lort Baronetcy, of Stackpoole Court in the County of Pembroke, was a title in the Baronetage of England. It was created on 15 July 1662 for Roger Lort. The title became extinct on the death of the third Baronet in 1698. The arms of Lort were: Per fess azure and gules, a cross or.

A monument survives in Westminster Abbey inscribed as follows:

"Sacred to the dear memory of her loving brother SR.GILBERT LORT of Stackpoole in the county of Pembrook [Pembroke], Bart.[Baronet] the onely son of Sr. JOHN LORT Bart. deceased, by the Right Honourable DAME SUSANNA one of the daughters of the Right Honourable John, Lord Holles late Earle of Clare, who changed this life for a better on the XIX day of September MDC XC VIII in the XXVIII year of his age. DAME ELIZABETH CAMPBELL widdow and relict of Sr. ALEXANDER CAMPBELL late of Calder in the Kingdom of Scotland Kt. hath dedicated this monument".

The 3rd Baronet died unmarried in 1698 when the baronetcy became extinct and his estates passed to his sister Elizabeth Lort (d.1714), whose monument is also in Westminster Abbey, inscribed: ""Near this monument lyeth the said Dame ELIZABETH CAMPBELL. She dyed September ye 28th 1714 in the 49th year of her age". She was the wife of Sir Alexander Campbell of Cawdor Castle in Scotland. Her descendant was created Earl Cawdor.

== Lort baronets, of Stackpoole Court (1662) ==
- Sir Roger Lort, 1st Baronet (c. 1608 – 1663)
- Sir John Lort, 2nd Baronet (c. 1637 – c. 1673)
- Sir Gilbert Lort, 3rd Baronet (c. 1670 – 1698)

== See also ==
- Sampson Lort
- Knights of the Royal Oak
