= John Brown (Wales MP) =

John Brown (died c. 1654) was an English politician who sat in the House of Commons in 1653.

Brown was of Little Ness, Shropshire. He was a member of the County Committee for Shropshire in 1650 and was fined £20 on 3 December 1650, "for neglecting to bring in his account, which he is ordered to do within a month, meantime he is suspended from acting." In 1653, Brown was nominated one of the representatives for Wales in the Barebones Parliament. He was assigned official lodgings in Dennis Bond's house on 8 July 1653.

Brown died before 9 June 1654 when the London Committee of Sequestration ordered the Shropshire Committee to summon his executor to pay in £300 13s. 0d. due to the State.

Brown's son Thomas married Mary Gough cousin of Thomas Baker of Sweeney, MP for Shropshire in 1653, and was left the Sweeney Hall Estate by Baker in 1675.

Brown may be the same as John Browne who was appointed 10 September 1650 Lieutenant of the second troop of Dragoons to be raised by Major Thomas Rippon, and appointed 19 August 1651 Captain of a " troop of Dragoons to be raised out of the horses seized for the service of Dragoons"

Parliament of England
New constituency Created for Barebones Parliament	Member of Parliament for Wales; 1653; With: Bussy Mansell; James Philips; Hugh Courtenay; John Williams; Richard Price	Reversion to former constituencies
