= Hugh Courtenay (MP) =

Hugh Courtenay (fl. 1640s and 1650s) was a Welsh politician who sat in the House of Commons in 1653. He was an active parliamentary officer in the English Civil War.

== Biography ==
Courtenay was created MA at Oxford University on 21 May 1649. He was Quarter-Master General in February 1650. He was appointed Deputy Governor of Beaumaris Castle on 30 August 1650 and received a commission to be "captain of a troop of horse of the Militia Forces to be raised in cos. Carnarvon and Anglesea" on 9 November 1650. He was Quarter-Master General again in 1651, and was Governor of Anglesea in 1651. The Council of State appointed him a Militia Commissioner for North Wales on 22 March 1651. He was granted a pass to go to Holland on 6 November 1652.

In 1653, Courtenay was nominated one of the representatives for Wales in the Barebones Parliament. He attended 88 times out of 242 meetings. The Whitehall Committee was ordered on 8 July 1653 to put him and others into possession of the house late Dennis Bond. He was added to the Committee for the Mint on 27 July 1653, and served upon other Committees.

Courtenay gave offence to the Council of State in 1654 or later, and was imprisoned with Major-General Harrison. The Council ordered their release on 19 February 1656 but the warrants for their release were "stayed till further orders" on 7 March. There were further orders on 14 October 1656 for "Hugh Courtney, prisoner in the Isle of Wight, to be discharged", and on 27 September 1658 for his release. On 14 July 1659 Col. John Jones asked the Committee of Safety for Hugh Courtenay who was Governor of Beaumaris before Parliament interrupted to be Governor "the place being now under Jones's command", but the committee left the matter "to be considered".

On 13 April 1660 the Council of State issued a warrant to Serjeant James Norfolk to apprehend Courtenay and bring him in custody before the Council, and the next day ordered the Serjeant by another warrant to receive into custody in Lambeth House, Adjutant General William Allen and Hugh Courtenay "for endeavouring to debauch some of the soldiers from their obedience, and otherwise suspected of being dangerous to the State". On 19 June 1661 Secretary Nicholas ordered their release from the Gatehouse, on security of £1,000 to leave the kingdom within 15 days.

Parliament of England
New constituency Created for Barebones Parliament	Member of Parliament for Wales; 1653; With: Bussy Mansell; James Philips; John Williams; Richard Price; John Brown	Reversion to former constituencies
