= Sir Erasmus Philipps, 3rd Baronet =

Welsh politician

Sir Erasmus Philipps, 3rd Baronet (c 1623 – 18 January 1697) was a Welsh politician who sat in the House of Commons in 1654 and 1659.

Philipps was the eldest son of Sir Richard Philipps, 2nd Baronet of Picton Castle. He succeeded to the baronetcy before 1654.

Picton Castle, the former seat of the Philipps family

In 1654, Philipps was elected Member of Parliament for Pembrokeshire in the First Protectorate Parliament. He was appointed a Militia Commissioner for south Wales on 14 March 1654. In 1655 he was appointed J.P. for Pembrokeshire and became a commissioner for Pembrokeshire, Cardiganshire and Carmarthenshire on 10 August 1655. He was elected MP for Pembrokeshire again in 1659 for the Third Protectorate Parliament.

Philipps married firstly Lady Cecily Finch, daughter of Thomas Finch, 2nd Earl of Winchilsea, and secondly Catherine Darcy, daughter of Edward Darcy. He was succeeded by his son John, who was also a Member of Parliament.

Parliament of England
Preceded by Not represented in Barebones Parliament	Member of Parliament for Pembrokeshire; 1654; With: Arthur Owen	Succeeded by James Philipps; John Clark
Preceded by James Philipps; John Clark	Member of Parliament for Pembrokeshire; 1659	Succeeded by Arthur Owen
Baronetage of England
Preceded by Richard Philipps	Baronet (of Picton Castle) c.1648–1697	Succeeded by John Philipps
