= Richard Price (Wales MP) =

Richard Price was a Welsh politician who sat in the House of Commons in 1653. He fought in the Parliamentary army in the English Civil War.

Price was the son of Edward Pryce of Gunley, Montgomeryshire. In 1639, he was High Sheriff of Montgomeryshire. He was commissioned as lieutenant by the Committee of both Houses on 23 September 1645 to take charge of some recruits at Reading. He fought as a captain at Denbigh in 1646 and was appointed with others on 15 June 1649 to demolish Montgomery Castle. He was a county commissioner for the Advance of Money for Montgomeryshire, Merioneth, and Denbighshire in 1649. He was appointed a Commissioner of Sequestration for North Wales on 18 February 1650. He had a commission from the Council of State as captain of a troop of Horse for North Wales on 13 August 1650. The Commissioners for Sequestration in London wrote to him and Edward Vaughan on 9 September 1650 " We commend your diligence, go on in seizing estates" and he was mentioned on 24 October 1650 as the " Treasurer of the moneys got in". In 1652 he was High Sheriff of Montgomeryshire again. He was assigned official lodgings on 15 June 1653.

In 1653, Price was nominated one of the representatives for Wales in the Barebones Parliament.

On the Restoration, he was considered a specially active and dangerous character. The Secretary of State issued an order from Whitehall on 18 July 1660 " that Richard Price of Aberbechan, co. Montgomery, be taken into safe custody," and in 1665 a warrant was issued to Sir Richard Ottley to apprehend him and others.

Price married firstly in July 1640 Mary Trotman daughter of John Trotman of Peers Court, Gloucestershire, His second wife was Rosamond.

Parliament of England
New constituency Created for Barebones Parliament	Member of Parliament for Wales; 1653; With: Bussy Mansell; James Philips; John Williams; Hugh Courtenay; John Brown	Reversion to former constituencies
