= Jenkin Lloyd =

Welsh clergyman and politician

Jenkin Lloyd (born 1624) was a Welsh clergyman and politician who sat in the House of Commons in 1654.

Lloyd was the son of John Lloyd of Fairdref Fawr and his wife Margaret Herbert, daughter of Morgan Herbert of Dol-y-cors in Cwmystwith, Cardiganshire. He matriculated at Jesus College, Oxford on 2 December 1640 aged 16 and was awarded MA in 1648. He may have been employed as a messenger by the Council of State in 1650 and 1651. He was a chaplain to Oliver Cromwell.

In 1654, Lloyd was elected Member of Parliament for Cardiganshire in the First Protectorate Parliament. He was assigned official lodgings in 1654 and petitioned for the ejection of scandalous ministers and schoolmasters in Wales, which petition was referred to the Treasury Commissioners on 17 August 1655. On 27 November 1655, he was ordered with others to examine a petition of the well affected of Haverfordwest concerning the election to office of a malignant. He and his fellow member petitioned for an abatement of the assessment for Cardiganshire three times between 1654 and 1656.

Lloyd was awarded DD at Oxford in 1661 and was rector of Llandyssul and vicar of Llanfihangel Ystrad in that year.

Parliament of England
Preceded by Not represented in Barebones Parliament	Member of Parliament for Cardiganshire; 1654; With: James Philipps	Succeeded by John Clark
