= John Williams (Wales MP) =

John Williams was a Welsh politician who sat in the House of Commons in 1653.

Williams was appointed Captain of the Horse, Regiment of Militia in South Wales on 12 September 1650. He was added to the High Court of Justice on 25 June 1651. He was appointed by order of Parliament a member of the Council of State as "Capt. John Williams of Wales", in May 1653, and attended 19 out of the 242 meetings of the Sixth Council from May to October 1653. In July 1653, Williams was nominated one of the representatives for Wales in the Barebones Parliament. He was placed on various committees and was assigned official lodgings in the house previously occupied by Dennis Bond on 8 July 1653.

He may have been the same John Williams as one of the County Committee for Radnorshire in August 1649, and as Captain John Williams of Bromyard who was appointed Agent and Sequestrator to the County Committee of Herefordshire on 10 May 1650 and held the office in July 1653.

Parliament of England
New constituency Created for Barebones Parliament	Member of Parliament for Wales; 1653; With: Bussy Mansell; James Philips; Hugh Courtenay; Richard Price; John Brown	Reversion to former constituencies
