= Sir Roger Lort, 1st Baronet =

Welsh Neo-Latin poet

Sir Roger Lort, 1st Baronet (or Lorte) (1607/8–1664) was a Welsh Neo-Latin poet.

== Life ==
He was the eldest son of Henry Lorte of Stackpole Court in the parish of St Petrox, Pembrokeshire. On 3 November 1626 he matriculated Wadham College, Oxford; he had been in the college since 1624, joined in 1625 by his brother Sampson Lort. He graduated B.A. on 11 June 1627, and during the same year became a student of the Middle Temple.

On the outbreak of the First English Civil War, Lort aided the Earl of Carbery in promoting the royalist cause in Pembrokeshire. On 19 April 1643 the House of Commons ordered that he be sent for as a delinquent. He eventually made submission, and after consenting to serve on the parliamentary committees for Pembrokeshire, Carmarthenshire, and Cardiganshire, he was freed from all delinquency, and restored to his estate and goods. In March 1649 Lorte with his brother Sampson undertook to victual ships that arrived at Milford Haven or Tenby.

Lort was active as a Justice of the Peace and committee man until 1656. When the English Restoration was imminent he declared himself royalist again. He was rewarded with a baronetcy on 31 January 1662. He died in 1664, and was buried in St Petrox church.

== Works ==
In 1646 Lort published in London a slender Epigrammatum liber primus. Christopher Ocland was an influence.

== Family ==
Lort married, first, by license dated 3 May 1632, Hester Annesley, daughter of Francis Annesley, 2nd Viscount Valentia. His second wife Joan, daughter of Humphrey Wyndham of Dunraven Castle, Glamorganshire, who later remarried, to Sir Edward Mansel. Lort left two sons and four daughters, and his son John (1637?–1678) succeeded him.

== Notes ==
Baronetage of the United Kingdom
New creation	Baronet (of Stackpoole Court); 1662–1663	Succeeded by John Lort
