= Bussy Mansell (1623–1699) =

Welsh politician (1623–1699)

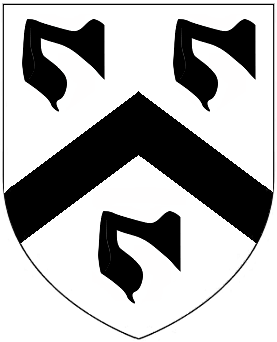
Canting arms of Mansel: Argent, a chevron between three maunches sable

Bussy Mansell (22 November 1623 – 25 May 1699) was a Welsh politician who sat in the House of Commons at various times between 1653 and 1699. He was a zealous Parliamentarian during the English Civil War.

== Origins ==
Mansell was the son of Arthur Mansell of Briton Ferry by his wife Janet Price, daughter of William Price of Britton Ferry. He was the grandson of Sir Thomas Mansell, 1st Baronet, MP. He had an income of £1,100 per annum and was patron of three livings in 1645. The Mansel family—the senior line of which was seated at Margam Abbey in Glamorgan (see Mansel Baronets and Baron Mansel) -- played a major role in the early settling of the Gower Peninsula. Their canting arms were: Argent, a chevron between three maunches sable.

== Career ==
Mansell was made Commander-in-Chief of the Parliamentary forces in Glamorgan, under Lord Fairfax, on 17 November 1645. Also in 1645, he was High Sheriff of Glamorgan and was made one of the County Committee of Glamorgan. He was added to the High Court of Justice on 25 June 1651. Mansell was one of the six Members appointed by Cromwell and his officers to represent Wales in the Barebone's Parliament from 4 July to 12 December 1653 On 27 June 1653—together with Colonel James Phillips—he was assigned by the Council of State the official lodgings lately occupied by Sir Harry Vane. He was appointed a Militia Commissioner for South Wales on 14 March 1654 and a Justice of the Peace for Glamorgan in 1655. He was an Assessment Commissioner for raising money there for the State in 1656, and a Commissioner under the Act for ejecting insufficient Ministers and Schoolmasters. He was made a Commissioner for providing for the safety of the Protector on 4 May 1658. On 13 July 1659 he was commissioned to command the Militia Troop in counties Pembroke, Carmarthen and Cardigan and on 30 July following he was appointed to command the whole militia forces in South Wales, horse and foot, "to lead them against the enemy if need be." This was as a result of Sir George Booth's "Cheshire Rising". On 19 September 1659 Mansel wrote to Samuel Moyer, Chairman of the London Committee of Compounding "By the care of our small force in South Wales, it was so kept from insurrection that there will be little work for Sequestration Commissioners. Yet some will be found, for divers delinquents now on hand have estates there and discoveries may be made, of some that went from these parts to the enemy in Chester."

In 1660 Mansell was elected Member of Parliament for Cardiff in the Convention Parliament. He was High Sheriff of Glamorgan again in 1677. He was elected MP for Glamorgan in 1679 until January 1681. He was elected MP for Cardiff again from 16 to 28 March 1681. In 1689 he was elected MP for Glamorgan again and sat until his death in 1699.

== Marriage and progeny ==
Mansell married Catherine Perry, daughter of Sir Hugh Perry, Alderman of the City of London and widow of Sir Edward Stradling, 3rd Baronet of St Donat's Castle, Glamorgan. He left progeny including:

- Thomas Mansel (1646–1684), eldest son and heir, whose white marble mural monument survives in Westminster Abbey (in the north aisle of the nave), displaying the arms of Mansel: Argent, a chevron between three maunches sable a crescent for difference, with the arms of Games, inscribed in Latin to the effect:

"Near this place lie, in certain hopes of a resurrection, the ashes of Thomas Mansell, eldest son of Bussy Mansell, Esquire of Briton Ferry in Glamorganshire. He took to wife Elizabeth, daughter and heir of Richard Games, Esquire, of Penderin in Brecknockshire, by whom he had one son Thomas, and two daughters Mary and Elizabeth. He died 13 December 1684 aged 38"

Thomas left a son Thomas Mansel (d.1706), MP for Cardiff, who was buried beside his father and bequeathed his estates to his kinsman Baron Mansell of Margam. Several other members of the Mansel family are buried in Westminster Abbey, for reason unknown.

== Death and burial ==
Mansell died at the age of 75, and was buried at Briton Ferry.

Parliament of England
New constituency Created for Barebones Parliament	Member of Parliament for Wales; 1653; With: James Philips; John Williams; Hugh Courtenay; Richard Price; John Brown	Reversion to former constituencies
Preceded by John Price	Member of Parliament for Cardiff Boroughs; 1660–1661	Succeeded by Sir Richard Lloyd
Preceded by Sir Edward Mansel, Bt	Member of Parliament for Glamorganshire; 1679–1681	Succeeded by Sir Edward Mansel, Bt
Preceded by Robert Thomas	Member of Parliament for Cardiff Boroughs; 1681–1685	Succeeded by Francis Gwyn
Preceded by Sir Edward Mansel, Bt	Member of Parliament for Glamorganshire; 1689–1699	Succeeded by Thomas Mansel
