= Laurence Oxburgh =

English landowner and politician

Laurence Oxburgh (1611–1678) was an English landowner and politician who sat in the House of Commons in 1659.

Oxburgh was the son of Thomas Oxburgh of Emneth, Norfolk. He was admitted at Caius College, Cambridge on 13 April 1624 and migrated to Queens' College, Cambridge in 1626. he was admitted at Gray's Inn on 1 December 1626. In 1659, Oxburgh was elected Member of Parliament for Aldeburgh in the Third Protectorate Parliament. He succeeded his great uncle, Sir Thomas Hewar, to the estates at Emneth.

Oxburgh died at the age of about 67 and was buried at Emneth on 25 July 1678.

Oxburgh married Dorothy Peyton, daughter of Sir John Peyton, of Doddington, Cambridgeshire.

Parliament of England
Preceded by Not represented in Second Protectorate Parliament	Member of Parliament for Aldeburgh; 1659; With: John Bence	Succeeded by Not represented in Restored Rump
