= James Philipps =

Welsh politician

James Philipps (c. 1594–2 May 1674) was a Welsh politician who sat in the House of Commons between 1653 and 1662. He was a supporter of the Parliamentary cause during the English Civil War.

== Life ==
Philipps was the eldest son of George Philipps of Tregibby who was a member of a leading Cardiganshire family and had been High Sheriff in 1606. He matriculated from Jesus College, Oxford in 1610. During the Civil War, he was acting as a Commissioner of Sequestration in west Wales. He was also a colonel in the Parliamentary army and was appointed a member of the High Court of Justice. He became High Sheriff of Cardiganshire in 1649.

In 1653, Philipps was nominated one of the representatives for Wales in the Barebones Parliament. He was elected Member of Parliament for Cardiganshire in 1654 for the First Protectorate Parliament. In 1656 he was elected MP for Cardiganshire and Pembrokeshire and chose to sit for Pembrokeshire in the Second Protectorate Parliament. He was re-elected MP for Cardiganshire in 1659 for the Third Protectorate Parliament.

In April 1660 Philipps was elected MP for Cardigan in the Convention Parliament. He was re-elected MP for Cardigan in 1661 for the Cavalier Parliament but was unseated on petition on 30 April 1662.

== Family ==
Philips married firstly Frances Phillips daughter of Sir Richard Phillips Bt. of Picton, Pembrokeshire. He married secondly in 1647 Katherine Fowler daughter of John Fowler merchant of London. Katherine, praised as one of the best poets of her generation, died in June 1664 and Philipps married thirdly Anne Rudd daughter of Sir Richard Rudd Bt. of Aberglasney, Carmarthenshire.

Parliament of England
New constituency Created for Barebones Parliament	Member of Parliament for Wales; 1653; With: Bussy Mansell; John Williams; Hugh Courtenay; Richard Price; John Brown	Reversion to former constituencies
Vacant Not represented in Barebones Parliament Title last held by Sir Richard Pryse, 1st Baronet	Member of Parliament for Cardiganshire; 1654–1656; With: Jenkin Lloyd	Succeeded by John Clark
Preceded by Sir Erasmus Philipps, 3rd Baronet; Arthur Owen	Member of Parliament for Pembrokeshire; 1656; With: John Clark	Succeeded by Sir Erasmus Philipps, 3rd Baronet
Preceded by John Clark	Member of Parliament for Cardiganshire; 1659	Not represented in Restored Rump
