= Arthur Owen (MP) =

Welsh politician

Arthur Owen (c 1608 – 8 September 1678) was a Welsh politician who sat in the House of Commons at various times between 1645 and 1678. He fought in the Parliamentary army in the English Civil War.

Owen was the son of John Owen of Orielton and his wife Dorothy Laugharne, and was brother of Sir Hugh Owen, 1st Baronet He matriculated at Hart Hall, Oxford on 18 February 1626 and was called to the bar at Lincoln's Inn in 1633. He was J.P. for Anglesea in 1642 and was made a Commissioner of Militia for Parliament in Pembrokeshire in 1642. He was a Major in the army of Col. Laugharne at the defeat of the Royalists in Pembrokeshire in 1643. He became a Colonel and was added to the Commissioners for Pembrokeshire, Cardiganshire and Carmarthenshire on 26 July 1644.

In 1645, Owen was elected Member of Parliament for Pembrokeshire in the Long Parliament. He sat until 1648 when he was excluded under Pride's Purge. In 1654, he was elected MP for Pembrokeshire again in the First Protectorate Parliament. He was appointed one of the committee for examining the petition of the "well affected of Haverfordwest" on 27 Nov. 1655. He was elected MP for Pembroke in 1659 for the Third Protectorate Parliament in a double return which was never resolved.

In 1660, Owen was elected MP for Pembrokeshire in the Convention Parliament. He was re-elected MP for Pembrokeshire in 1661 for the Cavalier Parliament and sat until his death in 1678.

Parliament of England
Preceded by Sir John Wogan	Member of Parliament for Pembrokeshire; 1645–1648	Succeeded by Not represented in Rump Parliament
Preceded by Not represented in Barebones Parliament	Member of Parliament for Pembrokeshire; 1654; With: Sir Erasmus Philipps, 3rd Baronet	Succeeded by James Philipps; John Clark
Preceded by Not represented in Protectorate Parliaments	Member of Parliament for Pembroke; 1659; With: Sampson Lort	Succeeded by Not represented in Restored Rump
