= List of members nominated to the English parliament in 1653 =

This is a list of members of Parliament nominated to the English parliament convened by Oliver Cromwell in 1653.

This Parliament was called the "Little Parliament", as no burgesses (representatives of cities and boroughs) were summoned to it except from the City of London. It did however include a small number of representatives for Scotland and Ireland. Given its skeletal nature, it was nicknamed the Barebone's Parliament after Praise-God Barebone one of the representatives for the City of London. The parliament first met on 5 July 1653 and sat until 12 December 1653.

== List of constituencies and members ==
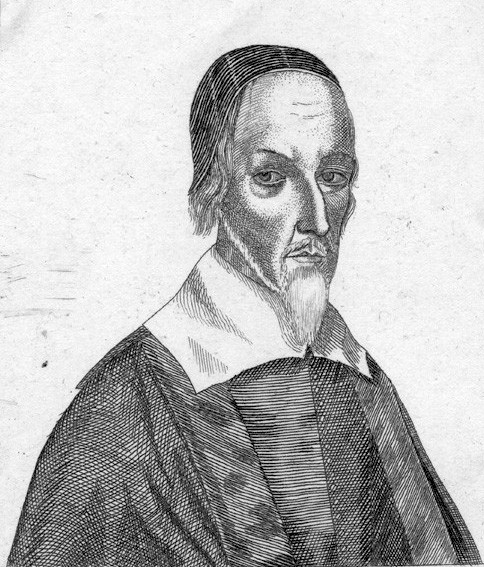
Praise-God Barebone.

This list contains details of the members nominated by Oliver Cromwell and the Army Council in 1653. There were no elections.

Constituency	Members	Notes
Bedfordshire	Nathaniel Taylor; Edward Cater.	
Berkshire	Samuel Dunch; Vincent Goddard; Thomas Wood.	
Buckinghamshire	George Fleetwood; George Baldwin.	
Cambridgeshire	John Sadler; Thomas French; Robert Castle; Samuel Warner.	
Cheshire	Robert Duckenfield; Henry Birkenhead.	
Cornwall	Robert Bennet; Francis Langdon; Anthony Rous; John Bawden.	
Cumberland	Robert Fenwick.	
Derbyshire	Gervase Bennet; Nathaniel Barton.	
Devon	General-at-sea George Monck; John Carew; Thomas Saunders; Christopher Martyn; James Erisey; Francis Rous (Note: Rous was appointed Speaker monthly (Willis 1750, p. 255).); Richard Sweet.	
Dorset	William Sydenham; John Bingham.	
Durham	Henry Dawson. (Note: Dawson or Davison (Willis 1750, p. 255).)	
Essex	Joachim Matthews; Henry Barrington; John Brewster; Christopher Earl; Dudley Templer.	
Gloucestershire	John Crofts; William Neast; Robert Holmes.	
Hampshire See Southampton (below)		
Herefordshire	Wroth Rogers; John Herring.	
Hertfordshire	Henry Lawrence; William Reeve.	
Huntingdonshire	Edward Montagu; Stephen Pheasant.	
Kent	Viscount Lisle; Thomas Blount; William Kenrick; William Cullen; Andrew Broughton.	
Lancashire	William West; John Sawry; Robert Cunliffe.	
Leicestershire	Henry Danvers; Edward Smith; John Prat.	
Lincolnshire	Sir William Brownlow; Richard Cust; Barnaby Bowtel; Humphrey Walcot; William Thompson.	
Middlesex	Sir William Roberts; Augustine Wingfield; Arthur Squib.	
City of London	Robert Tichborne; John Ireton; Samuel Moyer; John Langley; John Stone; Henry Barton; Praise-God Barebone.	
Monmouthshire	Philip Jones.	
Norfolk	Robert Jermy; Tobias Frere; Ralph Wolmer; Henry King; William Burton.	
Northamptonshire	Sir Gilbert Pickering; Bt; Thomas Brooke.	
Northumberland	Henry Ogle.	
Nottinghamshire	John Oddingsels; Edward Cludd.	
Oxfordshire	Sir Charles Wolseley; William Draper; Dr Jonathan Goddard.	
Rutland	Edward Horseman.	
Shropshire	William Bottrell; Thomas Baker.	
Somerset	General-at-sea Robert Blake; John Pine; Dennis Hollister; Henry Henley.	
County of Southampton	Richard Norton; Richard Major; John Hildesley.	
Staffordshire	George Bellot; John Chetwood.	
Suffolk	Jacob Caley; Francis Brewster; Robert Dunken; John Clarke; Edward Plumstead.	
Surrey	Samuel Highland; Laurence March.	
Sussex	Anthony Stapley; William Spence; Nathaniel Studeley.	
Warwickshire	John St Nicholas; Richard Lucy.	
Westmoreland	Major-General Charles Howard.	
Wiltshire	Sir Anthony Ashley Cooper; Nicholas Green; Thomas Eyre.	
Worcestershire	Richard Salwey; John James.	
Yorkshire	Lord Eure; Walter Strickland; Francis Lascelles; John Anlaby; Thomas Dickenson; Thomas St. Nicholas; Roger Coats; Edward Gill.	
Wales	Bussy Mansell; James Philipps; John Williams; Hugh Courtenay; Richard Price; John Brown.	
Scotland	Sir James Hope; Alexander Brodie (nominated but did not take his seat); John Swinton; William Lockhart; Alexander Jaffrays.	
Ireland	Sir Robert King; Colonel John Hewson; Colonel Henry Cromwell; Colonel John Clark; Daniel Hutchinson (Alderman); Vincent Gookin.	
Nominated	Lord General Oliver Cromwell; Major-General Lambert; Major-General Harrison; Major-General Desborough; Colonel Matthew Tomlinson.	

Total of 140 (England and Wales 129, Scotland 5, Ireland 6), with an additional six nominated by the assembly. (Note: Sources vary slightly: Total 144: made up of 128 members from England and Wales, and for Scotland and Ireland (and additional nominations) 16 (Willis 1750, p. 258); Total 144 (Burton & Goddard 1828, p. 500).; "From the names submitted, the Council chose 140 members: 129 for England, 5 for Scotland, and 6 for Ireland" (Archontology.org staff 2010). This number excludes the additional nominated members but includes an additional English MP.)

== See also ==
- Barebone's Parliament
