= Sampson Lort =

Welsh politician

Sampson Lort was a Welsh politician who sat in the House of Commons in 1659.

Lort was the second son of Henry Lort of Stackpole, Pembrokeshire and his wife Judith White, daughter of Henry White of Henllam, Pembrokeshire. In 1659, he was elected Member of Parliament for Pembroke in a double return for the Third Protectorate Parliament which was never resolved. He was a Commissioner responsible for collecting monthly levies from Pembrokeshire to pay for the armed forces under the Commonwealth.

Lort married a daughter of Sir John Philipps, 1st Baronet, of Picton. He was the brother of Sir Roger Lort, 1st Baronet.

Parliament of England
Preceded by Not represented in Second Protectorate Parliament	Member of Parliament for Pembroke; 1659; With: Arthur Owen	Succeeded by Not represented in Restored Rump
