= Earl's Court Square =

Garden square in Earl's Court, London

Coordinates: 51.48985°N 0.19275°W

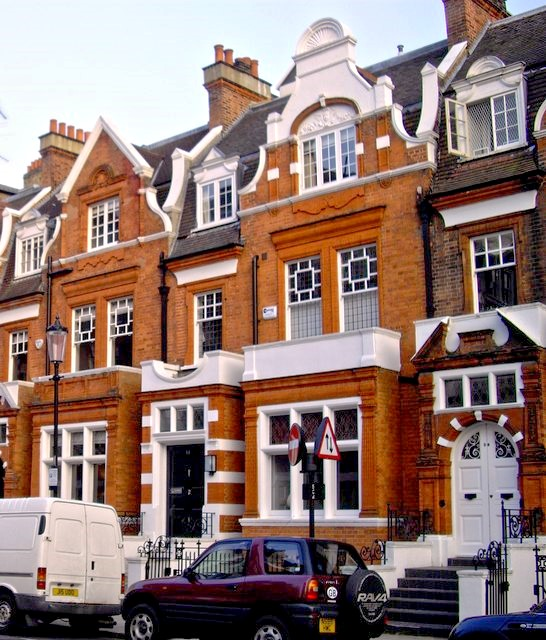
Houses in Earl's Court Square

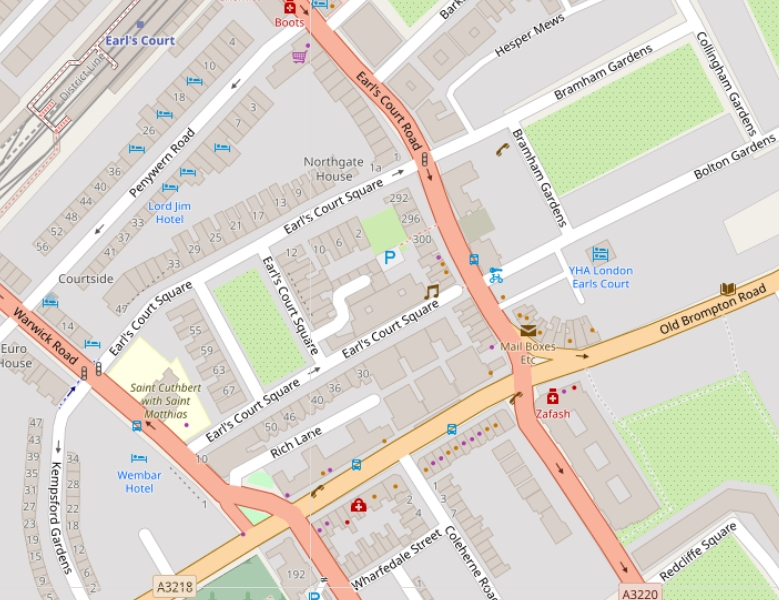
Earl's Court Square area map

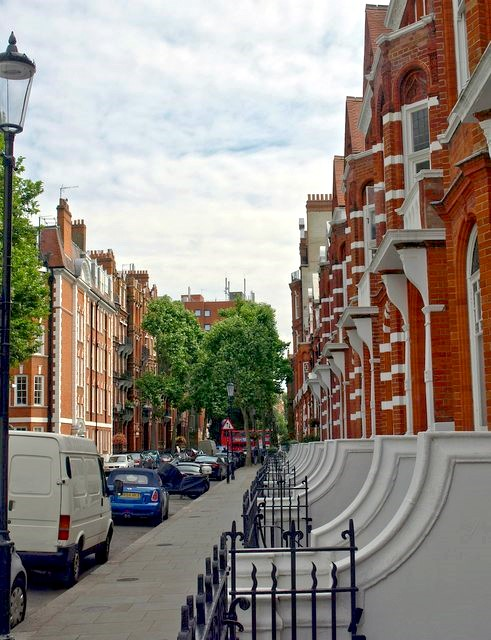
Houses in Earl's Court Square

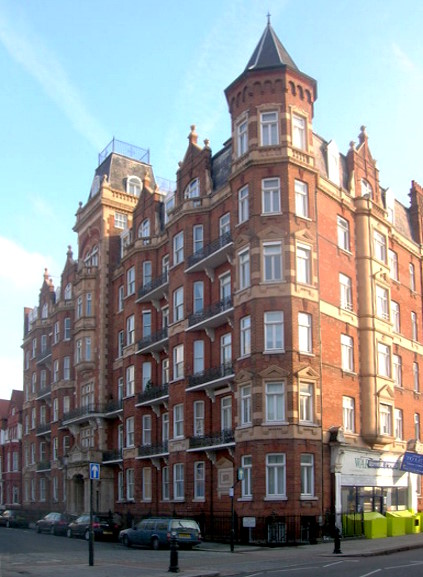
Langham Mansions

Earl's Court Square is a garden square in Earl's Court, London, England. It was developed from 1872 or 1873 on agricultural land belonging to the Edwardes family. It is primarily made up of stuccoed terraced houses with Italianate dressings but also contains properties in the Jacobean and Second Empire styles as well as a number of purpose built apartment blocks.

Notable former inhabitants include the choreographer Sir Frederick Ashton, Syd Barrett of Pink Floyd, and the ordnance inventor Sir William Palliser. At the Poetry Bookshop in the Square, conventional and modernist factions engaged in the "Battle of Earl's Court" in the 1970s.

== Location ==
The Square lies between Warwick Road in the west and Earl's Court Road in the east, with the northern and southern sides extending to those roads beyond the square itself. Farnell Mews runs from the east side of the garden square.

== History and architecture ==
The Square was developed from 1872 or 1873 on agricultural land originally belonging to the Rich family and then to the Edwardes family with the south side being developed last. The terrace numbered 30 to 52 (even) on the south side was built in the Jacobean Revival style in 1888–1890.

The general style of architecture is stuccoed terraced houses with Italianate dressings and upper floor balconies supported by columns, but there are several styles in the square including buildings that have Jacobean and Second Empire influences. There are several purpose built apartment blocks, including Wetherby Mansions, Herbert Court Mansions, Langham Mansions, and more recently, Northgate House, built in 1965.

By the 1970s, the Square was "extremely run down", and "there were two squalid brothels, they were at no. 9 and in the A-L block of Wetherby Mansions that were eventually evicted by the borough's Health Inspector and a sordid murder occurred at no. 4."

The Poetry Society Bookshop was located at number 21 and in the 1970s was the scene of the "Battle of Earl's Court" when traditionalist and modernist poets fought for the future of British poetry during the British Poetry Revival after the modernists took over the conservative Poetry Society.

There are no listed buildings in the Square but it was given conservation area status in 1975.

== Notable residents ==
- Sir Frederick Ashton, choreographer
- Syd Barrett of Pink Floyd, musician, lived at 29 Wetherby Mansions from January 1969 with the artist Duggie Fields.
- Joan Buck, American writer and actress
- Sir John Egan, businessman, in 1960
- Frank Gielgud, father of the actor Sir John Gielgud
- Sir William Palliser, ordnance inventor, lived at no 21 (originally Earl's Court Lodge), and it was later home to the Poetry Society
- Ninette de Valois, founder of The Sadler's Wells, later The Royal Ballet, lived at no 23 at the start of her career, as it was her parents' home.
