= Hesper Mews =

Street in London, England

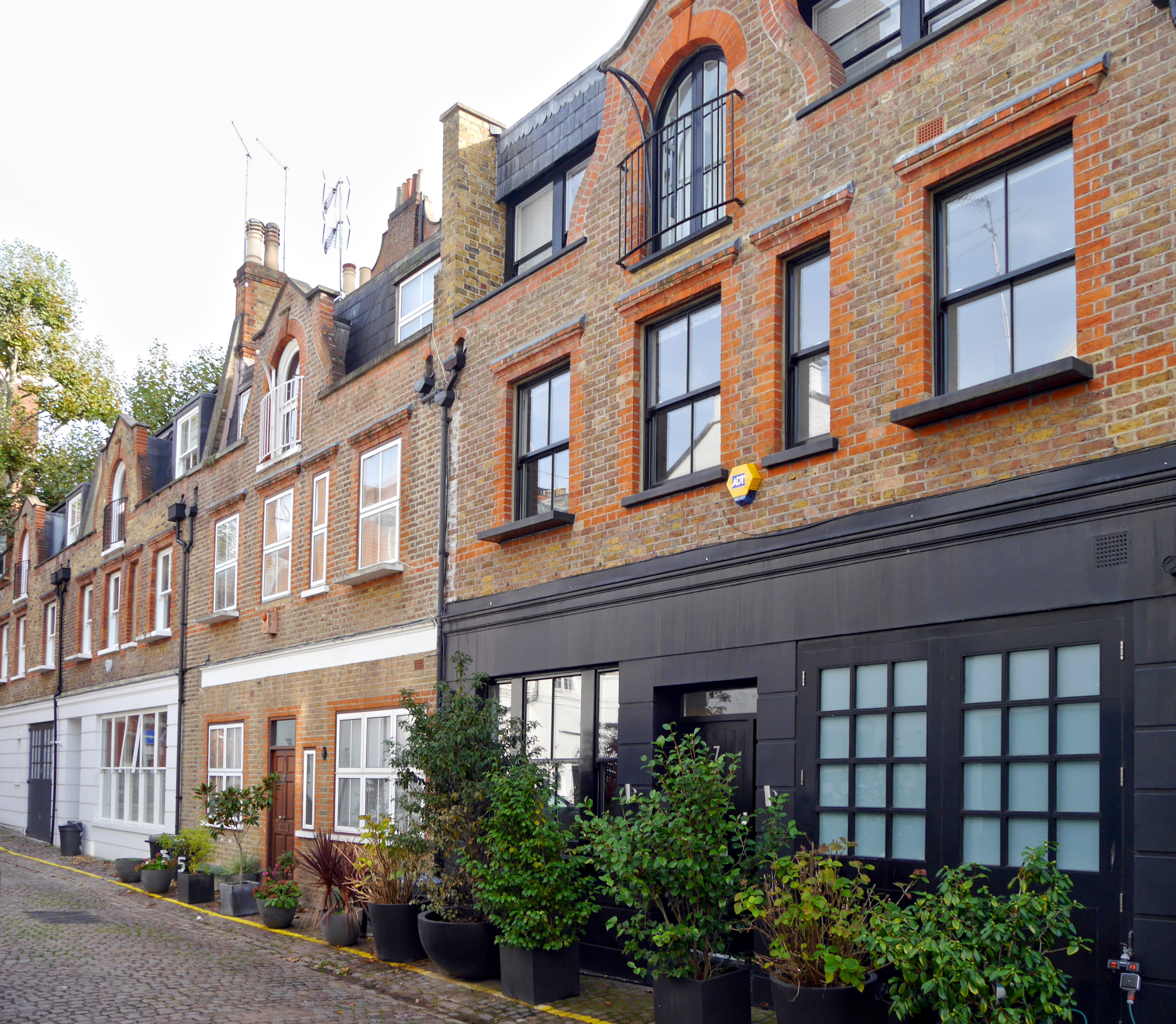
- Houses in Hesper Mews

- Location within Royal Borough of Kensington and Chelsea
- Part of: Gunter Estate
- Type: Mews street
- Location: Earl's Court, London
- Postal code: SW5
- Coordinates: 51.4916°N 0.1901°W

Construction
- Construction start: 1884-85

Hesper Mews is a mews street in the Earl's Court district of London, England. It runs between Bramham Gardens and Collingham Gardens and was laid-out in 1884-85 as part of the Gunter Estate, developed in the nineteenth century by James Gunter and his descendants.

== Origins ==
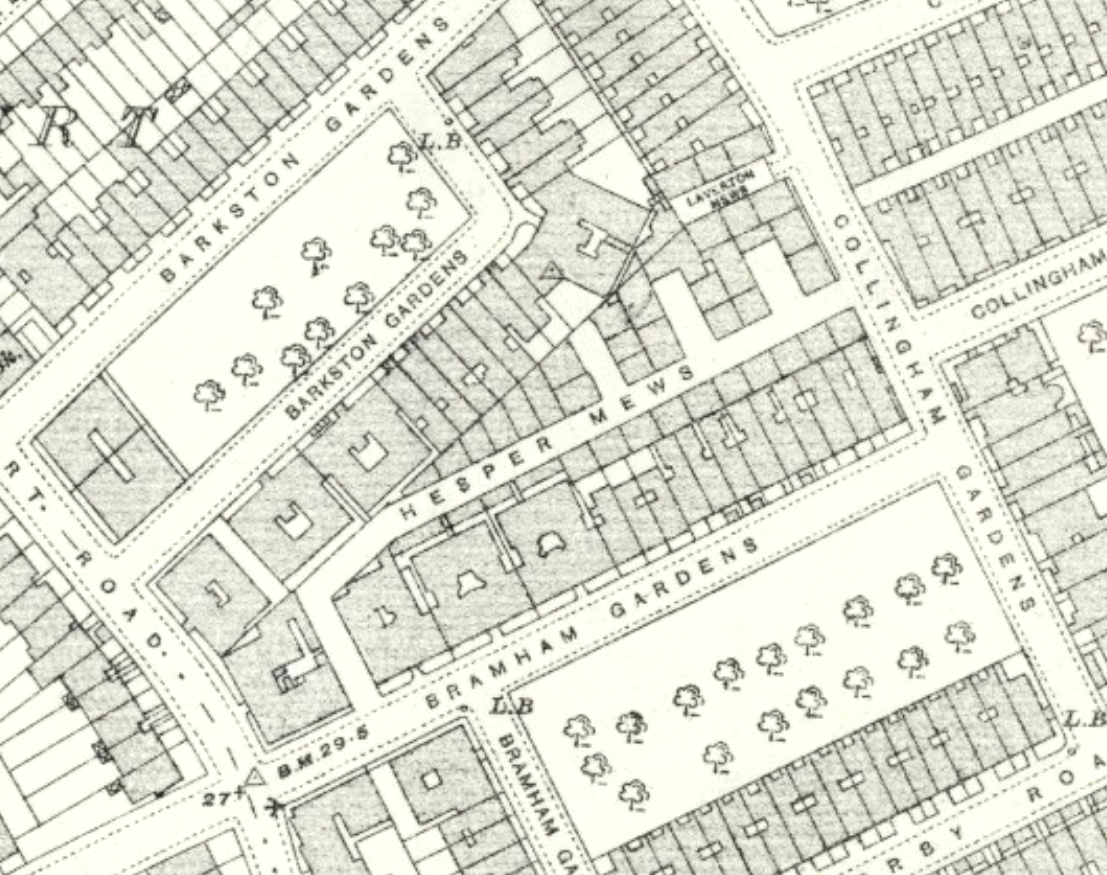
Hesper Mews on an Ordnance Survey map of 1913

Hesper Mews was laid out in 1884-85 as part of the Gunter Estate which was developed by James Gunter and his descendants in the nineteenth century. The origin of its name is unknown.

The Mews are to the east of Earls Court Road and immediately to the south of Barkston Gardens which was built by the Gunters on the site of the former Earl's Court House. The area was largely rural before the Gunter family began to develop it and the Mews lie on farmland formerly known as Four Acre Court Field and part of Great Courtfield.

They are in the Earl's Court district of London, England, in the Royal Borough of Kensington and Chelsea, and run between Bramham Gardens and Collingham Gardens and largely parallel to Bramham Gardens. There are three closes on the north side.

== Character ==
The Survey of London write that mews were of "considerable importance" to the Gunter Estate, with Hesper Mews the last mews to be laid out, in 1884–85, "the biggest and finest" and "on generous lines". It is one of the few mews on the Estate that is accessed from the higher status streets around it through a normal street entrance rather than through an archway. Nonetheless, the role of mews houses as accommodation for servants, particularly coachmen, with stabling on the ground floor for their employer's horses, is evident from the street plan with the houses in Barkston Gardens and Bramham Gardens, on to which the mews back, being much larger than those in Hesper Mews.

The British Architect commented in 1886, with reference to houses in Collingham Gardens, with which the Mews were also associated, that the stables in Hesper Mews were "quite out of sight" of Collingham Gardens, reflecting the need at the time for rich and poor to have "proximate but separate lives". As the horse gave way to the motor car, the coachmen of London's mews were replaced by, or found new employment as, chauffeurs and drivers with the ground floor used as garages for their vehicles, but, in the mid and later twentieth century, as the original leases ended and London's mews became gentrified, mews houses were increasingly occupied by middle and upper-class families.

== Notable residents ==
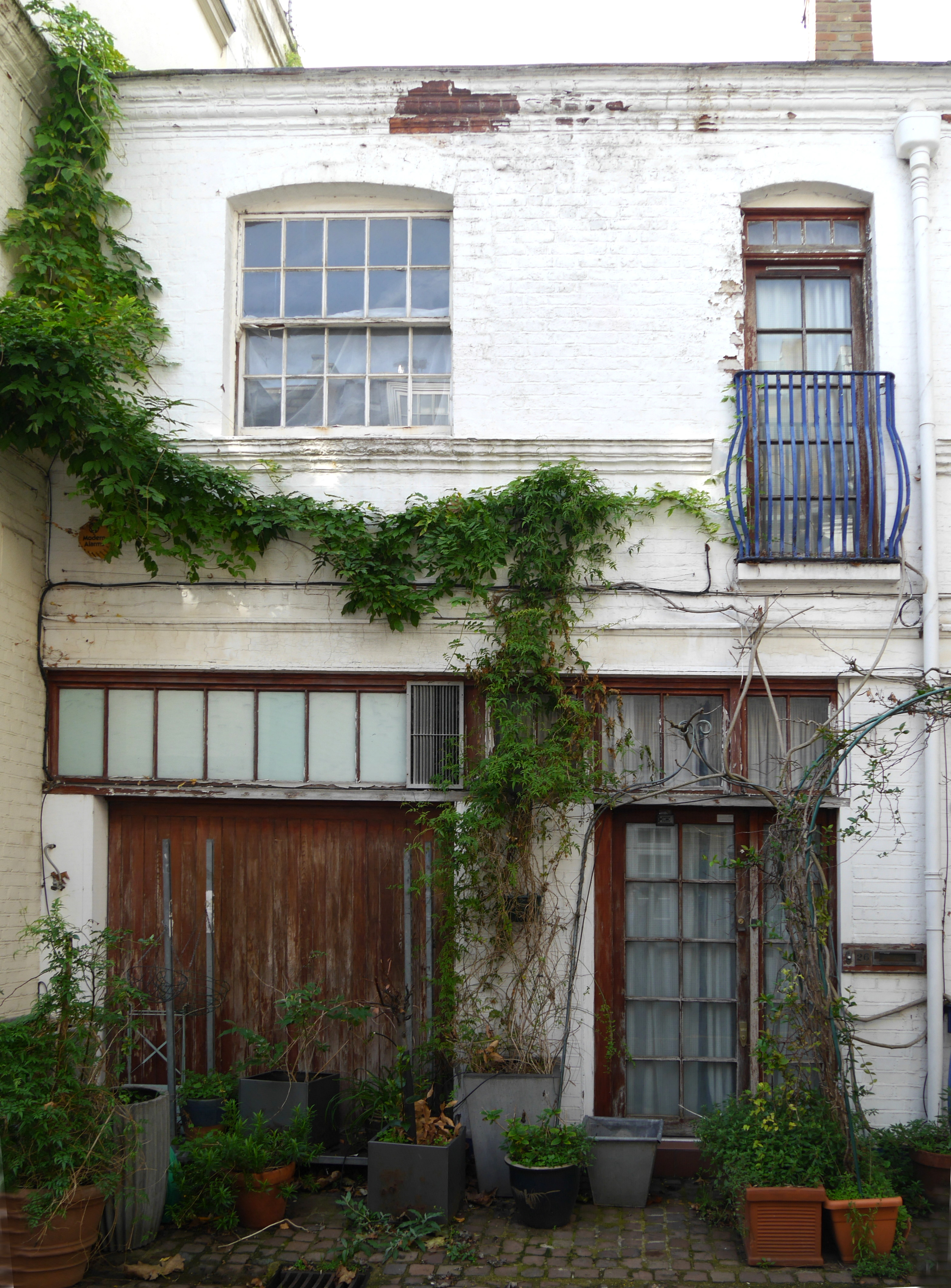
Number 26 seen in 2022

Notable former residents include:

- Canadian sculptor David Partridge at No. 26.
- Royal Navy officer Captain Guy D'Oyly-Hughes DSO DSC at No. 28.
- Australian painter Deirdre Henty-Creer at No. 18 in 1948.
- Electrical engineer and British Army officer E. J. H. Moppett at No. 28 in 1952.
- Astronomer Royal Sir Harold Spencer Jones (died 1960) at No. 40 in 1959.
- Conservative Party MP Laura Sandys at No. 30 in 1995.

== See also ==
- Devonshire Close
