= Philbeach Gardens =

Garden square in Earl's Court, London

Coordinates: 51.4911°N 0.1989°W

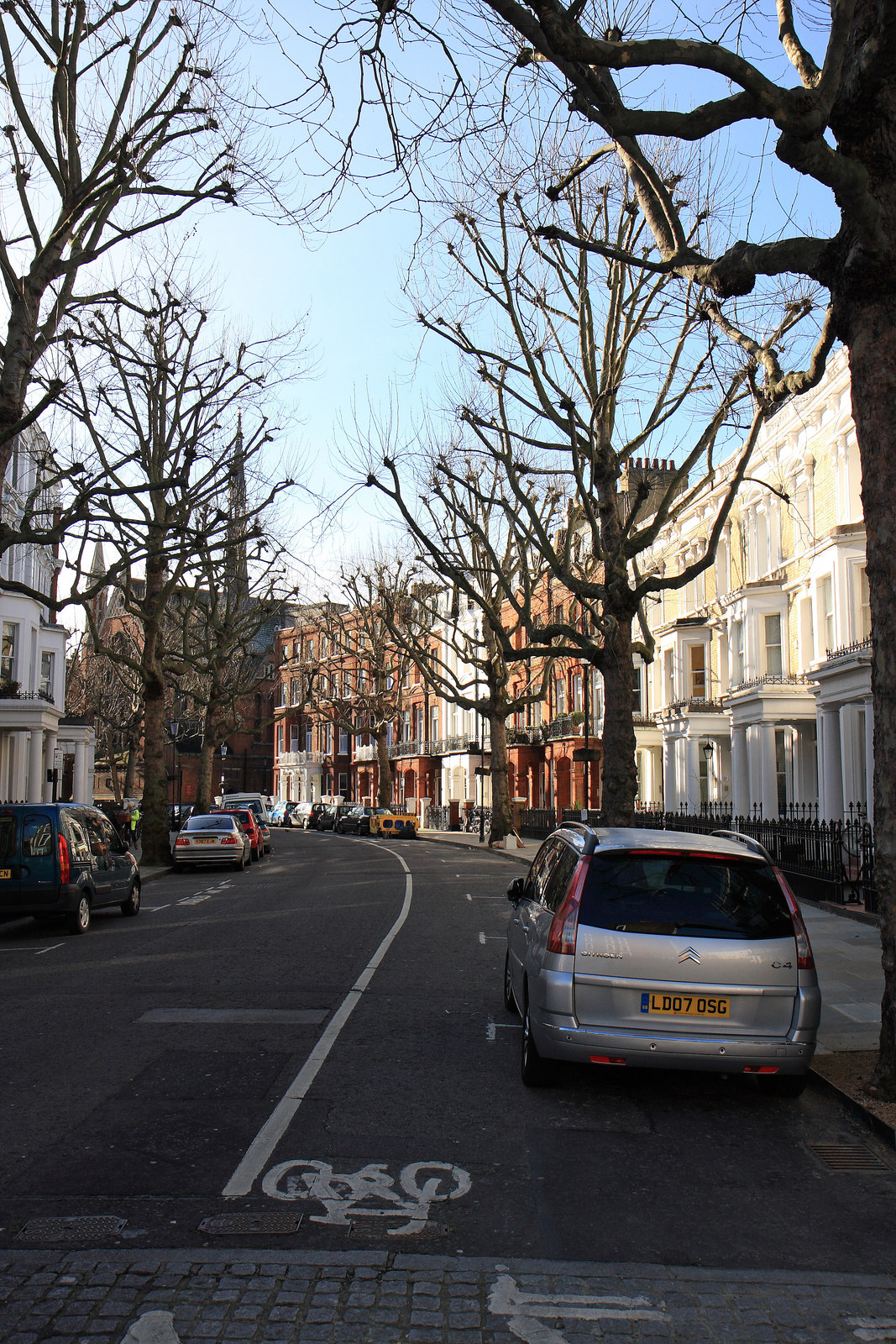
Northern end of Philbeach Gardens crescent. seen from Warwick Road

Philbeach Gardens is a communal garden square in the Earl's Court district of the Royal Borough of Kensington and Chelsea.

The communal garden at the centre of the development is 0.9815 hectares (2.425 acres) in size and was previously the site of tennis club and courts.

The square was developed on the site of the 190 acre Earl's Court Farm, which had been farmed by the descendants of Samuel Hutchins since 1720.

The development is named after Philbeach, a village in the Pembrokeshire parish of Marloes on the west coast of Wales. The 1st Baron Kensington, William Edwardes, had married Elizabeth Warren of Longbridge, Pembrokeshire and their only son became the 2nd Baron Kensington. The precarious finances of the 2nd and 3rd Baron Kensington precluded the development of the estate until the late 19th century.

In 1875 an application was made to the Metropolitan Board of Works by Martin Stutely the surveyor of Lord Kensington's estates, to create the roadway of Philbeach Gardens. The builder George Mineard began building by 1876. Mineard's previous developments had included Cluny Mews and parts of Warwick Road.

1-31, 64-73 and 89-110 Philbeach Gardens had been built by 1882, in the Italianate style. 88 Philbeach Gardens was built in the red-brick Domestic Revival style which was used for the rest of the development. It is the only double fronted house in Philbeach Gardens.

The average price of a property in Philbeach Gardens was £720,000 in 2020.

The musician Michael Howard rented a maisonette in a "decayed terrace" in Philbeach Gardens in the late 1940s. Mario Vargas Llosa lived in Philbeach Gardens in 1967.

St Cuthbert's, Earls Court is located at No. 50 Philbeach Gardens.

Michael McNay, writing in his Hidden Treasures of London describes Philbeach Gardens as a "big crescent embracing impressive parkland".

The civil servant and inventor Henry Cole first rented in Philbeach Gardens and then later bought a property there. Cole was attracted to the area because of his concern with the danger of sewer gas, having been impressed by builder George Mineard's ventilation system to mitigate the dangers of gas. Mineard and Cole established the "Fifth of November Club" which held firework displays from the gardens.

An armed siege took place on Philbeach Gardens between 20 and 22 March 1985. The perpetrator, James Alexander Baigrie, had escaped from prison in Edinburgh where he was serving a life sentence for murder. Baigrie killed himself with a sawn off shotgun in the van after a siege lasting 44 hours.
