= Coleherne Court =

Apartment block in Kensington and Chelsea, London

Coordinates: 51.4891°N 0.1896°W

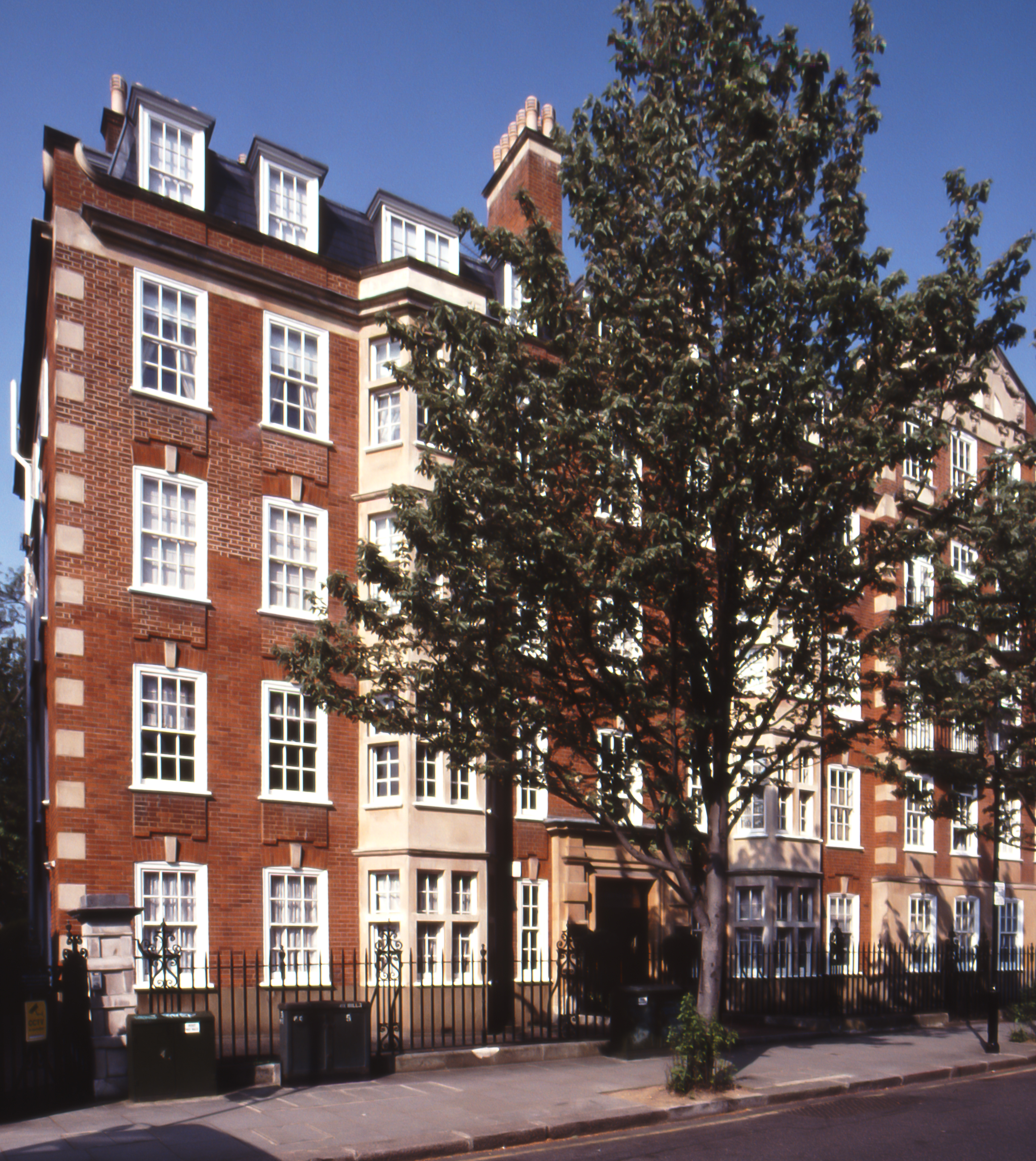
Coleherne Court in 2007

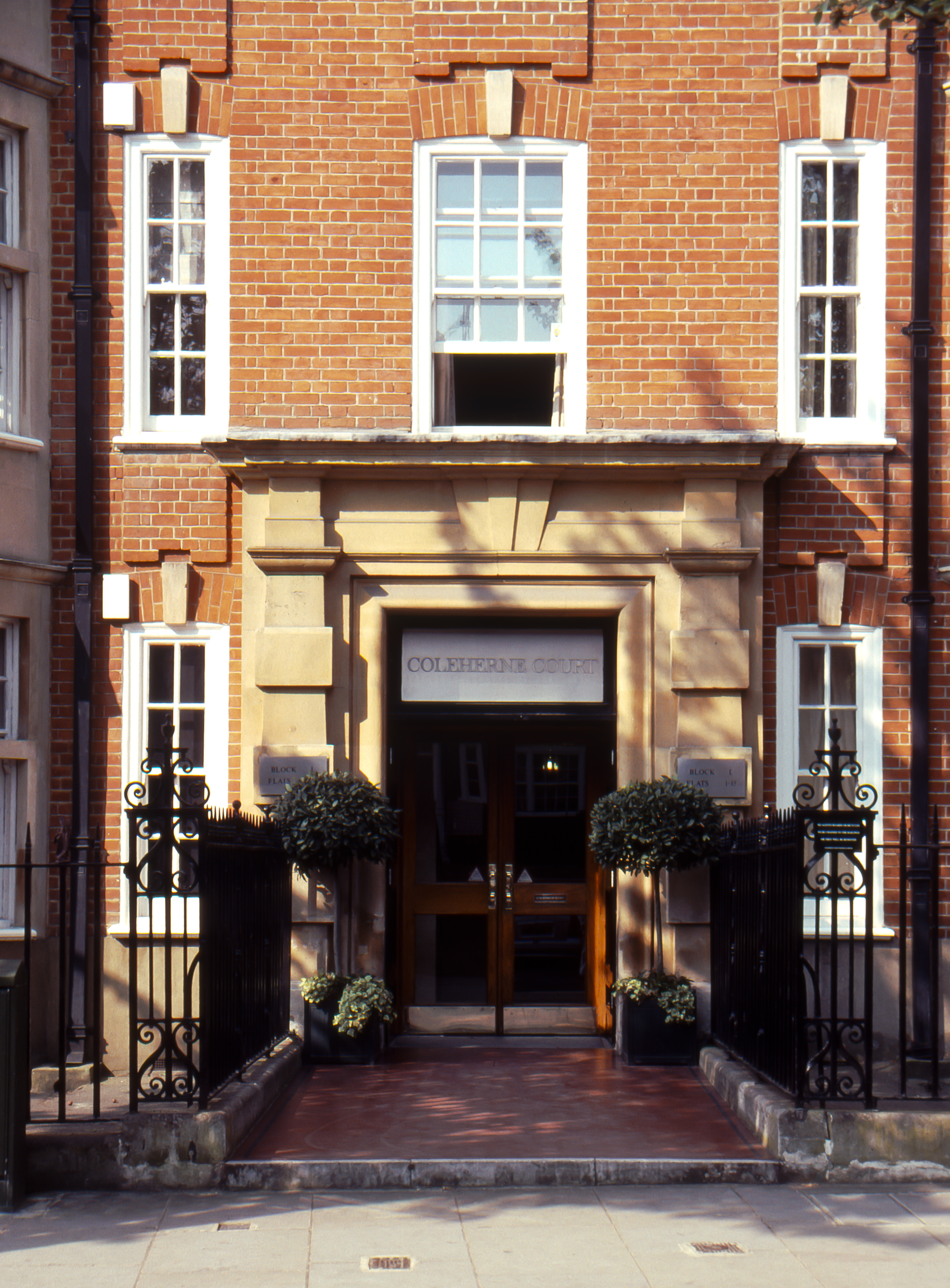
One of the entrances to Coleherne Court

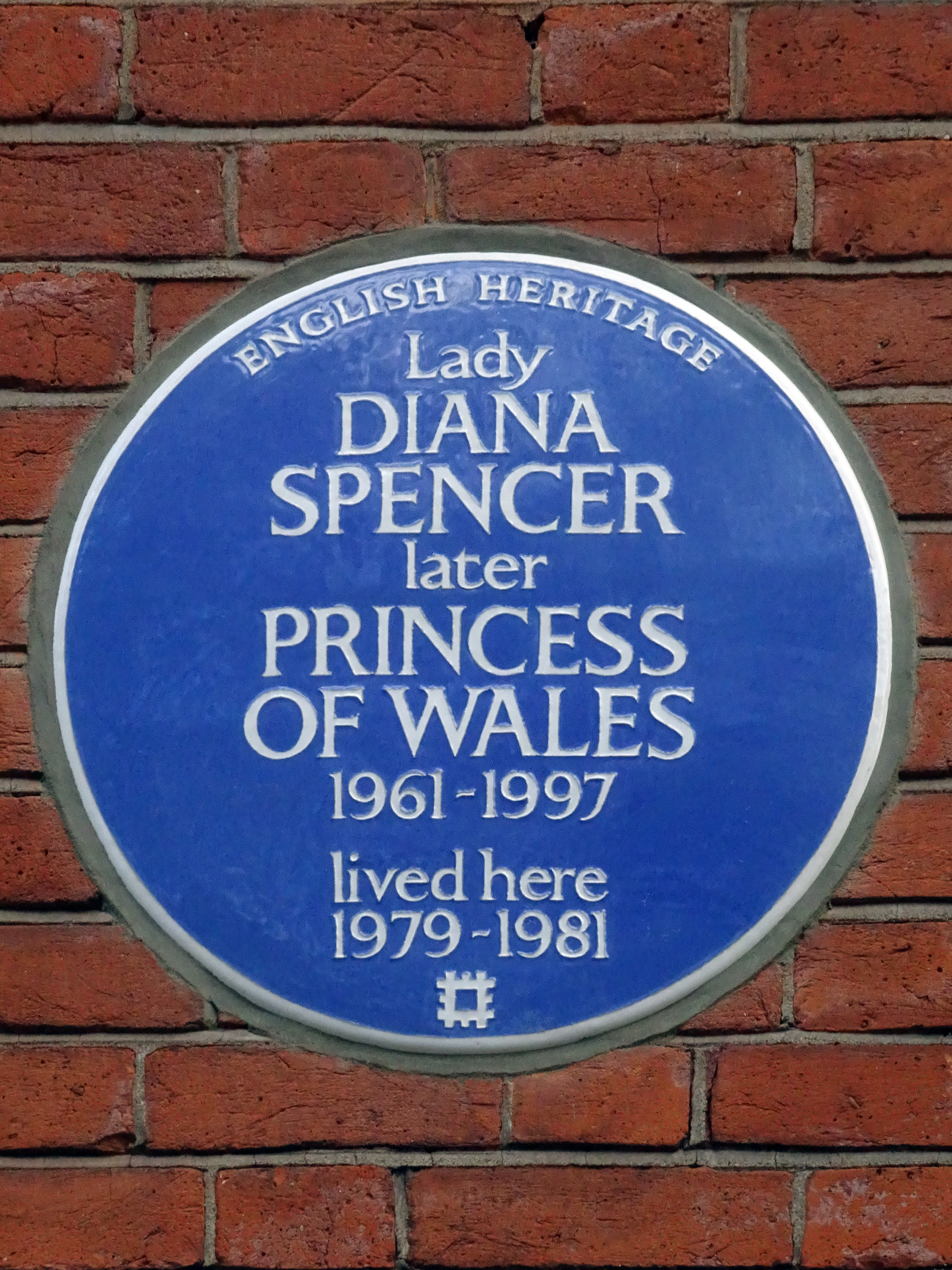
The English Heritage blue plaque commemorating Diana's residence at Coleherne Court

Coleherne Court is a large apartment block on the Old Brompton Road in the Earl's Court district of the Royal Borough of Kensington and Chelsea. It has large communal gardens and 24-hour porterage.

Coleherne Court stands on the site of the former Coleherne House and Hereford House. It was built between 1901 and 1904. It was constructed in red brick and Portland stone.

== Notable residents ==
Princess Mestchersky, a leader of White Russian émigrés from the Russian Revolution, lived at Coleherne Court following her escape from Russia. The actor Stewart Granger was born in Flat 60 in May 1913. In the 1950s Coleherne Court was the residence of the novelist Brigid Brophy. The actor Corin Redgrave lived at Flat 116 and held meetings of the Workers Revolutionary Party there. Other residents include the authors Stephen Vizinczey in the early 1970s and Sir Charles Petrie, 3rd Baronet in the 1960s.

The Soviet spy Oleg Penkovsky was debriefed by MI6 in July 1961 in a safe house flat they operated in Coleherne Court.

Lady Diana Spencer lived at Flat 60 at Coleherne Court from 1979 to 1981. Diana's deposit on the flat came from the £50,000 (equivalent to £246,188 in 2025) that was left to her by her great-grandmother, the American heiress Frances Ellen Work. She subsequently rented out the spare bedrooms of the flat for £18 a week (equivalent to £89 in 2025) to friends. She moved out of the flat to live at Clarence House shortly before her engagement to Charles, Prince of Wales was announced in 1981. Diana's mother, Frances Shand Kydd, sold her flat in 1981.

Sophie Rhys-Jones also lived at Coleherne Court prior to her 1999 wedding to Prince Edward.
