= David Partridge (artist) =

David Partridge CM RCA
- Born: David Gerry Partridge; October 5, 1919; Akron, Ohio, U.S.
- Died: December 11, 2006 (aged 87); Toronto, Canada.
- Resting place: St James-the-Less Cemetery, Toronto
- Education: University of Toronto
- Alma mater: Slade School of Fine Art
- Known for: Painter, sculptor
- Spouse: Helen Rosemary 'Tibs' Partridge (m. 1943)

David Gerry Partridge, CM RCA (5 October 1919 – 11 December 2006) was a Canadian painter, etcher, sculptor, educator and past President of the Royal Canadian Academy of Arts. He was best known for creating works made of nails driven into plywood to different heights forming representational or abstract sculptures which became known as "Nailies".

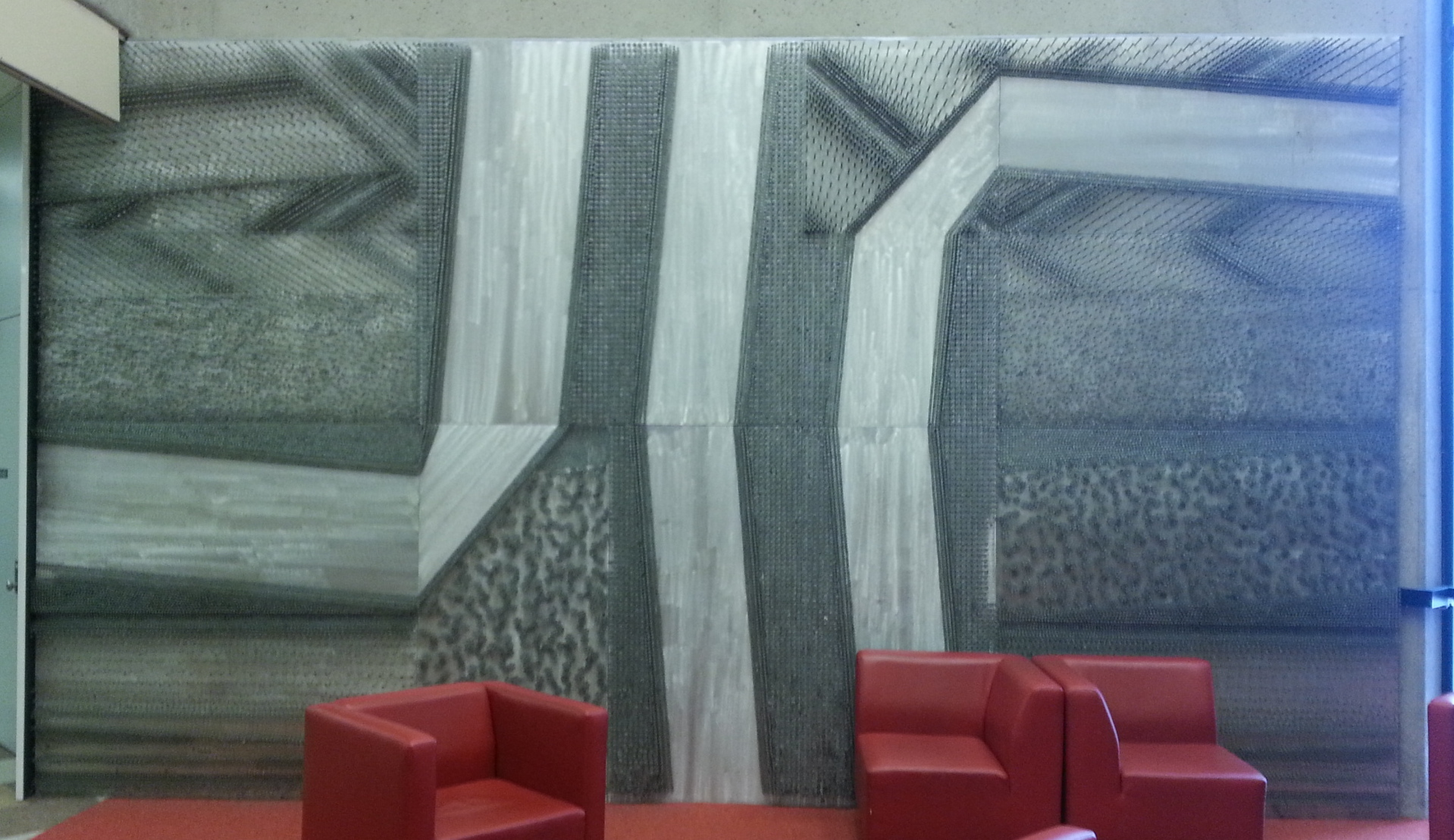
Strata (1969) (in York University Libraries)

== Early life and education ==
Partridge was born to Albert Partridge and Edith Harpham in Akron, Ohio, the youngest of three children. From 1928 to 1935 he lived in England where he attended Mostyn House School in Cheshire and later, Radley College in Oxfordshire. At the age of sixteen Partridge moved to Canada with his family.

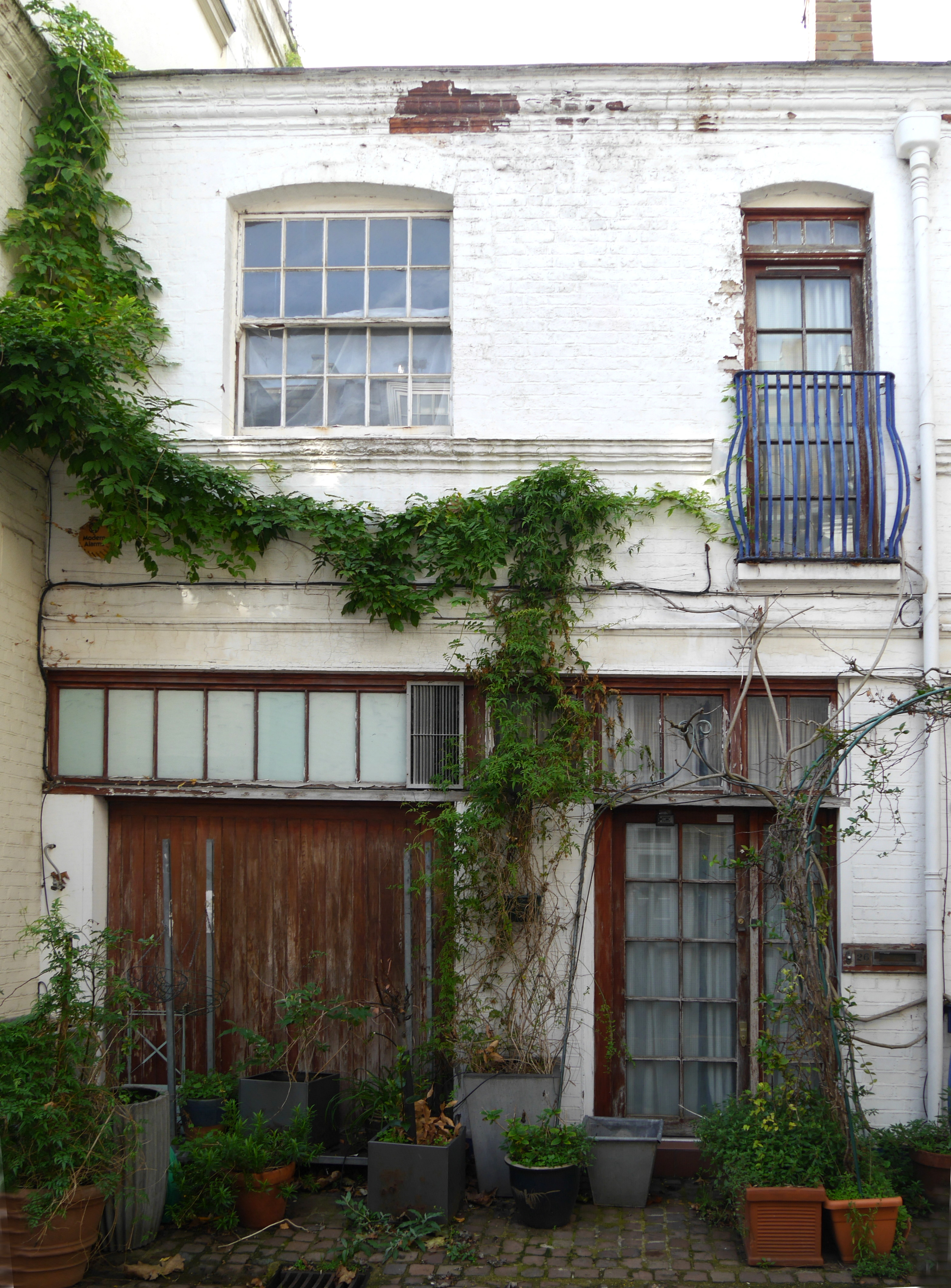
26 Hesper Mews. Patridge's home in London seen in 2022.

He attended Trinity College School in Port Hope, Ontario between 1935 and 1938 before studying history, geology and English at Hart House, University of Toronto from 1938 to 1941, under Caven Atkins. In 1941 Partridge joined the Royal Canadian Air Force where he served as a flying instructor until the end of World War II. In 1943 Partridge married a Canadian, Helen Rosemary 'Tibs' Annesley (1920-2008). A year later he was naturalised as a Canadian citizen and his wife gave birth to their first child.

In 1945 he began teaching at Appleby College, Oakville, Ontario and then at Ridley College a year later. In 1946-47 Partridge attended the Queen's Summer School of Fine Art where he was under the tutelage of Carl Schaefer, William Ogilvie and André Bieler. In 1948, he studied painting at the Art Student's League of New York, before he obtained a British Council scholarship which took him to the Slade School of Fine Art for a year in 1950, where he studied under Tom Monnington, Edward Ardizzone and John Buckland-Wright. He was also influenced by his contact with Graham Sutherland and John Piper.

Upon his return to Canada he rejoined the staff at Ridley College where he taught art between 1947 and 1956. Between 1952 and 1956 he also taught part-time at St Catharines Collegiate. He also taught in the summer school at Queen's where he was a student several years earlier. Partridge founded the Studio Club, the predecessor of the St. Catharines Art Association which he also founded. Partridge co-founded the St. Catharines Public Library Art Gallery in 1952 where he became its first curator, a post he was to hold until 1956. Partridge was also an unpaid art critic for the St Catharines Standard for three years. He taught with the St Catharines Art Association for four years before retiring from teaching, and relocating to Paris where he studied under Stanley William Hayter at the Atelier 17 studio in the winter of 1956. Partridge then moved to Sussex, England for 2 years. He returned to Canada in 1958 and settled in Ottawa. He returned to teaching part-time, twice a week at the Municipal Art Centre in Ottawa in 1960. Partridge retired from teaching in 1962.

== Career ==
Partridge first exhibited a painting with the Royal Canadian Academy in 1949 and returned in the two subsequent years with an oil and a watercolour. It was thirteen years before he presented further works to the academy returning with two works, one painting and one sculpture in 1964. He returned to the RCA at regular intervals throughout of his career. Partridge sat as a member of the RCA council between 1977 and 1979 and served as president in 1979.

Partridge held a solo exhibition in the Rose and Crown Tavern in the village of Fletching, East Sussex in 1957. Before his return to Ottawa in 1958 Partridge's main interests were in etchings and painting but he soon began to work on his first Naillies, after seeing the work of Zoltán Kemény in the Exhibition of Modern European Painting in the National Gallery of Canada.

"To create them, he would begin with a piece of plywood, although he was known to use doors, beams and other surfaces, which he sometime covered in buffed or abraded aluminum. Then he would hammer in nails of all sorts (aluminum, copper and steel) and lengths, beginning with the shortest to create a 'relief sculpture.' According to his fancy, he polished or trimmed the hammered nail heads, wrapped the Naillie in duct tape to give the surface more texture and lacquered or painted portions of the finished work."

Partridge had his first solo exhibition at the St. Catharines Public Library Art Gallery, Ontario in 1956 where he returned for another one-man show in 1959. He also held further solo displays at the Robertson Galleries, Ottawa in 1959, 1960, and in 1962. In 1959 he displayed works at the Third Biennial of Canadian Art, and at the Salon Nouvelle Reautes, and hosted a further one-man show at the Gallery of Contemporary Art in Toronto.

By 1960 Partridge had already shown with the Ontario Society of Artists, the Canadian Group of Painters, Canadian Society of Painters in Water colour, and in the annual exhibitions at the Art Gallery of Hamilton, in addition to his five solo shows. Partridge debuted at the Montreal Museum of Fine Arts annual spring exhibition in 1947, returning two years later when he presented a lithograph entitled Poverty, on sale for $10. He did not appear at this exhibition again until 1959 although he participated in a further four spring shows throughout the 1960s. He was awarded the $500 sculpture prize in 1962 for a work entitled Standing Configuration No.9. A few months thereafter he was courted by Time magazine. The Jerrold Morris International Gallery in Ontario presented his works in the winter of 1962. In the autumn of 1962 Partridge moved with his family to England where had received an honourable mention at the RCA earlier in the year. The family remained in England for 12 years before returning to Toronto in 1974 where Partridge was to engage the Robertson Gallery as his main agents.

Partridge showed at the 1963 Santiago Bienale and in the same year the Tate Gallery purchased a piece entitled Vertebrate Configuration for $750. By the time he held his first solo exhibition at the New Vision Centre London in 1964, Partridge had completed around 75 relief sculptures from nails. Partridge presented one of his nail sculptures at Expo 67 alongside Gerald Gladstone. The spring of 1967 saw Partridge present a further one-man show of sculpture and reliefs at the Hamilton Galleries, London, curated by Annely Juda Fine Art. In November 1970 Partridge hosted his fourth one-man exhibition in London, at the Covent Garden Gallery. The Windsor Art Gallery made Partridge's Canadian Shield their largest purchase to date, partnering with Ontario's Wintario Lottery to pay the artist's $30,000 fee in 1979.

Partridge indulged his lifelong passion for flying by buying a DIY microlight plane in 1980 which he partially constructed at his studio before transporting it to the family's summer lodge at Stony Lake, Ontario for its maiden flight.

In 1982 Partridge held a one-man show at the Wells Gallery in Ottawa, where his Nailies received an added dimension. The Nailies were not only imbued with colour and texture, but arranged in such a manner as to encourage the viewer to interact and touch the works, allowing soundwaves to resonate throughout the gallery. Partridge had a solo exhibition at the Moore Gallery, Hamilton in 1987, and showed at Nancy Poole's Studio in Toronto between 1986 and 1988. Partridge returned to the Moore Gallery several times including a 2003 exhibition entitled Phenomena. In 2001 Partridge returned to his St Catharines roots to deliver a talk on his life in the city, marking the opening of an exhibition curated by Greta Hildebrand entitled David Partridge the St Catharines Years (1946-1956). Partridge became a member of the Order of Canada in 2003.

== Death & legacy ==
Partridge suffered a stroke in 2003 which limited his mobility. He died of a heart attack on 11 December 2006, aged 87. He was survived by his wife, one son, and a daughter. In 2007, Toronto's Moore Gallery held a retrospective of Partridge watercolours painted after his stroke.

Partridge's works have been acquired by the National Gallery of Canada, the Art Gallery of Ontario, the Art Gallery of Windsor, the Tate Gallery, the Victoria and Albert Museum, and many other institutions.

One of his major commissions was Metropolis (1977), which is in the entrance of Toronto City Hall, and consists of nine panels of over 100,000 nails.
