= Edwardes family =

The Edwardes family is an English noble family that held the title of Baron Kensington in the Peerage of Ireland and holds the title of Baron Kensington in the Peerage of the United Kingdom. Historically, the family owned extensive lands in Pembrokeshire, Carmarthenshire, Cardiganshire and London.

Notable members of the family include:

- Francis Edwardes (d. 15 December 1725), Member of Parliament for Haverfordwest, married Lady Elizabeth Rich of the Rich family
- William Edwardes, 1st Baron Kensington (c. 1711 – 13 December 1801), Baron Kensington of the Peerage of Ireland
- William Edwardes, 2nd Baron Kensington (24 April 1777 – 10 August 1852)
- William Edwardes, 3rd Baron Kensington (3 February 1801 – 1 January 1872)
- William Edwardes, 4th Baron Kensington (11 May 1835 – 7 October 1896), Baron Kensington of the Peerage of the United Kingdom
- William Edwardes, 5th Baron Kensington (1868–1900)
- Hugh Edwardes, 6th Baron Kensington (1873–1938)
- William Edwardes, 7th Baron Kensington (1904–1981)
- Hugh Ivor Edwardes, 8th Baron Kensington (b. 1933)
