= Registered historic parks and gardens in Pembrokeshire =

List of buildings in county of Wales

Pembrokeshire shown within Wales

Pembrokeshire is a county in the south-west of Wales. It covers an area of 1,619 km^{2} (625 sq mi). In 2021 the population was approximately 123,700.

The Cadw/ICOMOS Register of Parks and Gardens of Special Historic Interest in Wales was established in 2002 and given statutory status in 2022. It is administered by Cadw, the historic environment agency of the Welsh Government. Elisabeth Whittle described Cadw as having a "somewhat special and guiding role" in the preservation of historic parks and gardens, since they are "an integral part of Welsh archaeological and architectural heritage". The register includes just under 400 sites, ranging from gardens of private houses, to cemeteries and public parks. Parks and gardens are listed at one of three grades, matching the grading system used for listed buildings. Grade I is the highest grade, for sites of exceptional interest; Grade II*, the next highest, denotes parks and gardens of great quality; while Grade II denotes sites of special interest.

There are 35 registered parks and gardens in Pembrokeshire. Three are listed at Grade I, eight at Grade II*, and 24 at Grade II.

== Key ==
Grade	Criteria
I	Parks and gardens of exceptional interest
II*	Parks and gardens of great quality
II	Parks and gardens of special interest

== List of parks and gardens ==
List of parks and gardens
Name	Location Grid Ref. (Note: Sometimes known as OSGB36, the grid reference is based on the British national grid reference system used by the Ordnance Survey.) Geo-coordinates	Date Listed	Description / Notes	Grade	Reference Number	Image
111 Main Street, Pembroke	Pembroke; SM9873101314; 51°40′26″N 4°54′41″W	1 February 2022	Garden The walled and terraced formal garden of a Georgian house (built c. 1760).	II	PGW(Dy)39(PEM)	111 Main Street, Pembroke
Blackaldern	Narberth; SN1199814280; 51°47′42″N 4°43′36″W	1 February 2022	Garden The house and gardens date from the early to mid-nineteenth century.	II	PGW(Dy)27(PEM)	
Boulston Old Hall	Uzmaston, Boulston and Slebech; SM9793812535; 51°46′28″N 4°55′45″W	1 February 2022	Country house garden The walled and compartmented garden of a (now ruined) Elizabethan mansion. The main feature is a 70-metre-long (230 ft) walled terrace overlooking the Western Cleddau estuary.	II	PGW(Dy)69(PEM)	the ruins of a house in woodland
Caldey Priory	Tenby; SS1403596448; 51°38′08″N 4°41′15″W	1 February 2022	Gardens The nineteenth-century compartmented gardens were located to the north of a mansion built in 1800 (demolished in the 1970s). They incorporate traces of the medieval monastery gardens including a series of ponds and the ruins of a mill.	II	PGW(Dy)60(PEM)	a pond overgrown with plants, there are trees and stone buildings in the background
Castell Malgwyn	Manordeifi; SN2170743307; 52°03′32″N 4°36′04″W	1 February 2022	Park and gardens The landscaping in mostly contemporary with the house (built 1790s), with further development later in nineteenth century. The house, in the north-west of the site, is set within its garden, pleasure grounds and parkland. To the south-east is a model farm and walled garden.	II*	PGW(Dy)32(PEM)	Castell Malgwyn
Castle Hall	Milford Haven; SM9170305889; 51°42′45″N 5°00′56″W	1 February 2022	Woodland garden The landscaping, which includes two substantial terraces, dates to c. 1810 and incorporated some earlier features. Amongst the terraced garden buildings is one formerly referred to as a 'pinery'.	II*	PGW(Dy)16(PEM)	
Cilwendeg	Boncath; SN2175238774; 52°01′06″N 4°35′53″W	1 February 2022	Park and gardens The late eighteenth-century mansion lies to the east of the park. The formal garden has a series of seven terraced lawns and, like the walled garden north-east of the house, was probably created in the 1830s. To the west of the house is a shell grotto (grade II* listed)	II*	PGW(Dy)17(PEM)	the shell house, a single story structure of white quartz
Coedcanlas	Martletwy; SN0085608758; 51°44′30″N 4°53′05″W	1 February 2022	Country house garden Also protected as a scheduled monument, the earthworks to the north and south of the farmhouse and known as the Old Garden (north) and Hop Garden (south) are the remains of an elaborate and sophisticated formal garden thought to have been created by Sir Arthur Owen in the late seventeenth century .	II	PGW(Dy)26(PEM)	Coedcanlas
Colby Lodge	Amroth; SN1566707920; 51°44′21″N 4°40′12″W	1 February 2022	Country house garden and walled garden John Colby, a local mine owner, built the house in 1803 and the surrounding garden and walled garden date from around this time. Subsequent changes of ownership have led to numerous improvements and restorations; the landscaped gardens evolved after the mid-nineteenth century and were followed by the development woodland gardens and walks.	II	PGW(Dy)29(PEM)	an octagonal gazebo in a woodland garden with stone paths
Cosheston Hall	Cosheston; SN0041404443; 51°42′10″N 4°53′19″W	1 February 2022	Park and gardens The landscape park, formal and informal gardens have undergone a series of alterations and remodelling most notably in the mid-nineteenth century.	II	PGW(Dy)30(PEM)	Cosheston Hall
Cresselly	Jeffreyston; SN0589906917; 51°43′37″N 4°48′39″W	1 February 2022	Park and gardens The landscape park and terraced garden around the house (built c. 1770) underwent substantial remodelling in the second half of the nineteenth century. The kitchen garden, which covers nearly 1.5 acres (0.61 ha), is to the north of the house.	II	PGW(Dy)31(PEM)	
Ffynone	Manordeifi; SN2420738661; 52°01′05″N 4°33′44″W	1 February 2022	Park and gardens The house was designed by John Nash in the 1790s and remodelled in the 1910s by Inigo Thomas who added the Italianate garden loggia and formal terrace gardens adjacent to the house.	I	PGW(Dy)18(PEM)	a lawn and balustraded terrace in front of a country house
Fishguard Bay Hotel	Fishguard and Goodwick; SM9480338763; 52°00′32″N 4°59′25″W	1 February 2022	Terraced garden The extensive terraced and wooded garden was laid out c. 1900–1910 by Treseder of Truro when the hotel was bought by the Great Western Railway and remodelled.	II	PGW(Dy)63(PEM)	Fishguard Bay Hotel
Great Harmeston	Tiers Cross; SM9243009001; 51°44′27″N 5°00′25″W	1 February 2022	Country house garden The small enclosed garden of an eighteenth century gentry house.	II	PGW(Dy)19(PEM)	
Haroldston	Merlin's Bridge; SM9567914602; 51°47′32″N 4°57′47″W	1 February 2022	Country house garden The garden earthworks of the formal pleasure garden and the ruined house are also a scheduled monument.	II	PGW(Dy)20(PEM)	Haroldston
Haverfordwest Priory	Haverfordwest; SM9563215251; 51°47′53″N 4°57′51″W	1 February 2022	Garden The layout of the medieval monastic gardens was preserved following its discovery during archaeological excavations in the 1980s and 1990s. The gardens are within a larger area designated as a scheduled monument.	I	PGW(Dy)62(PEM)	a garden with raised beds surrounded by low stone walls
Kilgetty	Kilgetty/Begelly; SN1331308262; 51°44′29″N 4°42′16″W	1 February 2022	Country house garden The structural remains of a pleasure garden and enclosed park of a seventeenth century mansion, which had been abandoned by the mid-eighteenth century and was later demolished.	II	PGW(Dy)33(PEM)	Kilgetty
Lamphey Bishop's Palace & Lamphey Court	Lamphey; SN0214501213; 51°40′28″N 4°51′43″W	1 February 2022	Park and gardens The mansion, now a hotel, (built 1823) and the ruins of a medieval bishop's palace are set within grounds that contain informal and formal gardens, a walled park, ponds and water features.	II*	PGW(Dy)34(PEM)	stone walls of a ruined building
Landshipping	Martletwy; SN0204911098; 51°45′47″N 4°52′08″W	1 February 2022	Gardens The earthwork remains of a seventeenth-century formal landscaped garden and walled gardens associated with a house demolished soon after 1811.	II*	PGW(Dy)35(PEM)	Landshipping
Lawrenny	Martletwy; SN0142506979; 51°43′33″N 4°52′32″W	1 February 2022	Park and gardens The site dates back to at least the sixteenth-century and the walled garden is known to have existed in 1762. A redesign of the parkland and formal gardens took place in the mid-nineteenth century with the construction of the new house (demolished in 1950).	II	PGW(Dy)36(PEM)	
Manorowen	Scleddau; SM9327636419; 51°59′14″N 5°00′40″W	1 February 2022	Country house garden and walled garden The late seventeenth-century walled garden and the gazebo within it are grade II listed structures. They are separated from the late Georgian house (also grade II) and its informal garden by the A487 road.	II	PGW(Dy)64(PEM)	a garden with trees and shrubs
Merrixton House Farm	Amroth; SN1435608090; 51°44′25″N 4°41′21″W	1 February 2022	Country house garden and kitchen garden The house, built c. 1750, and its gardens were substantially remodelled in c. 1880.	II	PGW(Dy)37(PEM)	Merrixton House Farm
Molleston Baptist Chapel	Templeton; SN0937211884; 51°46′22″N 4°45′48″W	1 February 2022	Park The formal approach, a straight drive flanked by an avenue of trees, is likely contemporary with the building of the mid-eighteenth-century chapel. There is a graveyard adjacent to the chapel.	II	PGW(Dy)66(PEM)	a graveyard with a chapel in the background
Monkton Old Hall & Vicarage, Pembroke	Pembroke; SM9795601535; 51°40′33″N 4°55′21″W	1 February 2022	Country house garden The garden, parts of which may date to the fourteenth century, is associated with the medieval priory, of which the Old Hall was possibly the guest-house. However, the terraces are thought to be mid-nineteenth-century.	II*	PGW(Dy)40(PEM)	Monkton Old Hall & Vicarage, Pembroke
Orielton	Hundleton; SR9542799409; 51°39′21″N 4°57′28″W	1 February 2022	Park and gardens The house lies in parkland across which several gardens have been created. These include a nineteenth-century hexagonal walled garden, an American garden (present in 1828 but now lost), and the remains of a Japanese garden created in 1919. To the north-west of the park are several Bronze Age round barrows.	II	PGW(Dy)38(PEM)	a brick and stone tower
Picton Castle	Uzmaston, Boulston and Slebech; SN0146913405; 51°47′01″N 4°52′43″W	1 February 2022	Park and gardens The medieval castle was greatly remodelled in the early-eighteenth century and again in c. 1800 as were the park and gardens with the formal gardens giving way to more informal landscaping.	II*	PGW(Dy)42(PEM)	a rectangular pond within a walled garden
Plas Glyn-y-Mel	Fishguard and Goodwick; SM9662037026; 51°59′38″N 4°57′46″W	1 February 2022	Garden The mansion and picturesque garden with its small terraces and lawns was constructed in 1799–1805 for the historian Richard Fenton.	II	PGW(Dy)22(PEM)	a country house surrounded by trees
Scolton Manor	Spittal; SM9879321873; 51°51′31″N 4°55′20″W	1 February 2022	Country house garden The park and gardens were laid out in the 1840s following the construction of the neo-classical style country house. The property was sold to the local authority in 1974 and the house is now a museum.	II	PGW(Dy)25(PEM)	a road leading to a house behind trees
Slebech Park	Uzmaston, Boulston and Slebech; SN0356814412; 51°47′36″N 4°50′56″W	1 February 2022	Park and country house garden The south-facing terraces that overlook the river were probably constructed in the late seventeenth century. The house, on the site of a Knights Hospitaller commandery, was built in 1776 and the layout of the park that had been established by 1790 is largely unchanged.	II*	PGW(Dy)43(PEM)	a series of terraces, with a river in the foreground
St Brides Castle	Marloes and St Brides; SM7982310895; 51°45′11″N 5°11′25″W	1 February 2022	Park and gardens The site consists of the grade II* listed house (built 1833) and the remains of an earlier house, each with associated gardens, separated by an expansive of open parkland.	II	PGW(Dy)23(PEM)	a castellated house viewed cross a field with sheep
St Brynach's Churchyard, Nevern	Nevern; SN0827440066; 52°01′31″N 4°47′42″W	1 February 2022	Cemetery garden The fifteenth-century church with earlier tower is set within a churchyard with an unusual avenue of yew trees that are thought date to the medieval period.	II	PGW(Dy)67(PEM)	a church with a square tower in a churchyard
Stackpole Court	Stackpole and Castlemartin; SR9791995967; 51°37′33″N 4°55′12″W	1 February 2022	Park and garden The landscape of parks, gardens, lakes and woodlands were developed from the early eighteenth century onwards. The house (demolished in the 1960s) was separated from the former deer park (to the north) and a landscape park (to the east) by a lake system covering 80 acres (32 ha).	I	PGW(Dy)44(PEM)	a walled garden
Trewarren	St Ishmaels; SM8285606836; 51°43′04″N 5°08′38″W	1 February 2022	Park and gardens The small park, extensive pleasure grounds and walled kitchen garden are contemporary with the building of the mid-nineteenth-century house.	II	PGW(Dy)65(PEM)	Trewarren
Upton Castle	Cosheston; SN0204904594; 51°42′17″N 4°51′55″W	1 February 2022	Country house garden and walled garden The gardens are mostly from the nineteenth century onwards with much of the tree planting taking place in the 1920s. The walled garden to the east of the house was extant in c. 1875.	II	PGW(Dy)45(PEM)	a path beside a herbaceous border
Warpool Court Hotel	St Davids and the Cathedral Close; SM7497024858; 51°52′35″N 5°16′11″W	1 February 2022	Country house garden and kitchen garden The house, now a hotel, was built c. 1865 and the gardens were developed over several phases between this time and the early twentieth century.	II	PGW(Dy)68(PEM)	Warpool Court Hotel

== See also ==
- Scheduled monuments in Pembrokeshire
- Grade I listed buildings in Pembrokeshire
- Grade II* listed buildings in Pembrokeshire
