= Lewis Wogan =

Lewis Wogan (c. 1649 – 1702) was one of the Wogans of Boulston, in Pembrokeshire, Wales.

He was the son of Abraham Wogan of Boulston Hall, who was High Sheriff of Pembrokeshire in 1648. Lewis Wogan, who studied at Jesus College, Oxford for a time after 1665, was himself High Sheriff of Pembrokeshire in 1672.

He married Katherine Philipps of Cardigan. After his death, Boulston Hall passed to the Wogans of Gawdy Hall, Norfolk who sold it to the Acklands.
