= Alban Stepney =

English politician

Alban Stepney or Stepneth (died 1611) was an English politician who sat in the House of Commons at various times between 1572 and 1611.

Stepney was the son of Thomas Stepney of Aldenham, Hertfordshire and his wife Dorothy (Dorati) Winde, daughter of John Winde (also Weind or Wynde and Wyld) of Ramsey, Huntingdonshire. He matriculated as a scholar from Christ's College, Cambridge in the autumn of 1562 and entered Clement's Inn. In 1561, he was appointed registrar of the Diocese of St Davids. In 1572, he was elected Member of Parliament for Haverfordwest. He was High Sheriff of Pembrokeshire from 1572 to 1573. He was commissioner for the tanneries in Pembrokeshire in 1574 and was a J.P. for Pembrokeshire from 1575. He was elected MP for Haverfordwest again in 1584 and in 1586. In 1589 he was elected MP for Cardigan. He was Sheriff of Pembrokeshire again from 1589 to 1590 and was High Sheriff of Carmarthenshire from 1596 to 1597. He became Deputy Lieutenant in 1602. In 1604 he was elected MP for Pembrokeshire. He was High Sheriff of Pembrokeshire again from 1604 to 1605. He acquired Prendergast House (which was in ruins by the late 18th century) from his first wife, and was some time created Knight Banneret.

Stepney married firstly Margaret Cathern, daughter of Thomas Catharn or Cadern of Prendergast, and secondly Mary Philipps, daughter of William Philipps of Picton. His eldest son John was created a baronet in 1621.

Parliament of England
Preceded by John Garnons	Member of Parliament for Haverfordwest; 1572–1586	Succeeded by Sir James Perrot
Preceded by Francis Cheyne	Member of Parliament for Cardigan; 1589	Succeeded by Sir Ferdinando Gorges
Preceded by John Philipps	Member of Parliament for Pembrokeshire; 1604–1611	Succeeded by John Wogan
