= Sir John Philipps, 1st Baronet =

Welsh politician (died 1629)

Sir John Philipps, 1st Baronet (died 27 March 1629) was a Welsh landowner and politician who sat in the House of Commons in 1601.

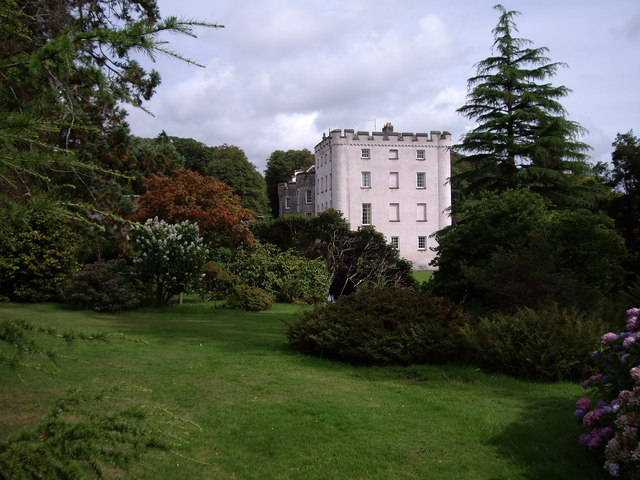
Picton Castle

Philipps was the son of Morgan Philipps of Picton and his wife Elizabeth Fletcher, daughter of Richard Fletcher of Bangor, Caernarvonshire. He was registrar of the diocese of Bangor. In 1585 he succeeded to the estate of Picton Castle which had passed to his father from William Philipps who was MP for Pembrokeshire in 1559. He spent much of his life involved in property disputes. He was High Sheriff of Pembrokeshire in 1595.

In 1601, Philipps was elected Member of Parliament for Pembrokeshire. He was appointed a J.P on 13 April 1603. In 1611 he was High Sheriff of Pembrokeshire again. He was created a baronet on 9 November 1621. He was High Sheriff of Carmarthenshire for 1622–23. Philipps died in 1629 and was buried at Slebech.

== Family ==
Philipps married firstly Anne Perrot, daughter of Sir John Perrot and half-sister of Sir Thomas Perrot. He married secondly Margaret Dennys, daughter of Sir Thomas Dennys of Bicton, Devon. He was succeeded in the baronetcy by his son, Richard. His daughter Dorothy married Francis Annesley, 1st Viscount Valentia and was mother of Arthur, 1st Earl of Anglesey

Parliament of England
Preceded by Sir Gelly Meyrick	Member of Parliament for Pembrokeshire; 1601	Succeeded by Alban Stepney
Baronetage of England
New creation	Baronet (of Picton Castle); 1621–1629	Succeeded by Richard Philipps
