= Uzmaston =

Village and parish in Pembrokeshire, Wales

Coordinates: 51.79°N 4.95°W

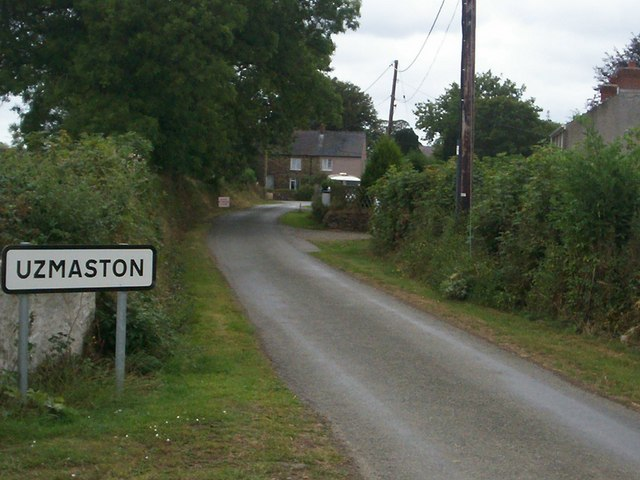
- Uzmaston

- Location within Pembrokeshire
- OS grid reference: SM969144
- Community: Uzmaston, Boulston and Slebech
- Principal area: Pembrokeshire
- Country: Wales
- Sovereign state: United Kingdom
- Police: Dyfed-Powys
- Fire: Mid and West Wales
- Ambulance: Welsh

Uzmaston is a small parish in Pembrokeshire, Wales, about 1 mile (1.6 km) south-east of Haverfordwest. The village, to the northwest of Boulston, forms part of the community of Uzmaston, Boulston and Slebech, and lies near the bank of the Western Cleddau. It contains the Grade II-listed St. Ismael's Parish Church which has existed since at least 1230, was extensively rebuilt in 1870-73, and restored in the 1990s.

== History ==
Historically, Uzmaston and the surrounding parish belonged to the Hundred of Dungleddy. Its name is a compound word meaning "Osmund's farm". In 1993, five Roman coins were unearthed behind the church at Uzmaston. At the time of the 1851 census, Uzmaston belonged to a parish comprising an area of 2,070 acres with a population of 683 people, 307 male and 376 female.

Originally a farming village, the dwellings sit nestled between two farms.

== Landmarks ==
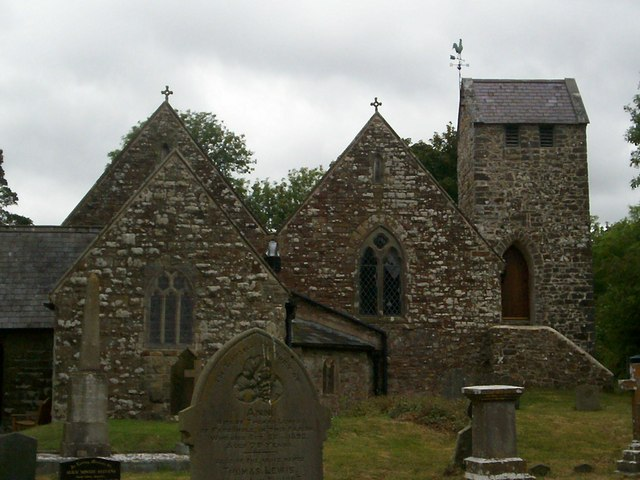
St. Ismael's Church

Its parish church is dedicated to the 6th-century Breton prince and Welsh saint Isfael. In 1230 it was granted to Wizo the Fleming. It was extensively rebuilt in 1870-73 and renovated in 1991–92. It was further restored in 1999 by Hereford architect Lingen Barker. It became a Grade II listed building on 16 July 2004. There is a house on the edge of Uzmaston along the lane from Boulston named "The Cottage". There are the ruins of a cottage between the main lane (known locally as "Nans Lane") and the Cleddau, just to the southwest of the village.

The village is the start of the frolic, a public footpath that starts at the church gates, through the churchyard, across the field and then follows the River Cleddau into Haverfordwest. From the churchyard looking down river is white rock, a single chalk rock on the edge of the river.

== Land ==
Samuel Lewis, writing in his A Topographical Dictionary of Wales, stated that Uzmaston "comprises a moderate extent of enclosed and cultivated land: the soil is generally fertile, and the inhabitants are chiefly employed in agriculture. The western part of it, containing the straggling extemity of a suburb of Haverfordwest, called Cartlett, is included within the new electoral limits of that borough.

Geologically, the area is known for the yellow-grey Uzmaston Beds, dated to the Silurian period, which are unfossiliferous in the lower parts.
