= High Sheriff of Pembrokeshire =

Welsh county ceremonial officer

This is a list of High Sheriffs of Pembrokeshire. The High Sheriff is the oldest secular office under the Crown. Formerly the High Sheriff was the principal law enforcement officer in the county but over the centuries most of the responsibilities associated with the post have been transferred elsewhere or are now defunct, so that its functions are now largely ceremonial. The High Sheriff is reappointed in March of each year.

== List of Sheriffs ==
=== 16th Century ===
- 1540: Sir Thomas Jones of Harroldston
- 1541: John Philipps of Picton Castle
- 1542: Sir John Wogan, of Wiston Castle (1st term)
- 1543: John Vaughan of Whitland
- 1544: Owen ap Owen of Pentre Evan
- 1545: John Sutton of Camrose
- 1546: Morgan Jones of Milton
- 1547: Henry Wyrriott of Orielton (1st term)
- 1548: Thomas Philipps of Picton Castle
- 1548: Sir Thomas Jones of Harroldston
- 1549: John Wogan of Wiston Castle
- 1550: Sir John Perrot, of Scotsborough
- 1551: Sir John Perrot, Kt., of Carew
- 1552-1553: John Bowen, of Trellwyn
- 1554: Sir John Wogan, of Wiston Castle (2nd term)
- 1555: John Vaughan of Whitland
- 1556: John Williams of Panthowell
- 1557: William Rhys of Sandyhaven
- 1558: Arnold Butler of Johnstone
- 1559: Henry Wyrriott of Orielton (2nd term)
- 1560: John Bowen of Trellwyn
- 1561: Griffith White of Henllan
- 1562: John Barlow of Slebech Park
- 1563: William Philipps of Picton Castle
- 1564: Rhys ap Owen of Upton Castle
- 1565: Thomas Cadarn of Prendergast Place
- 1566: John Wogan of Boulston
- 1567: John Wogan of Wiston Castle (grandson of Sir John Wogan)
- 1568: Francis Laugharne of St Brides
- 1569: Thomas Bowen of Pentre Evan
- 1570: Griffith White of Henllan
- 1571: John Bradshaw of St Dogmaels
- 1572: John Wogan of Wiston Castle
- 1573: Alban Stepney of Prendergast
- 1574: John Wogan of Boulston
- 1575: John Barlow, of Slebech Park
- 1576: Morgan Philipps, of Picton Castle
- 1577: George Wyrriott, of Orielton
- 1578: Francis Laugharne, of St Brides
- 1579: Thomas Revell of Forest, Cilgerran
- 1580: Sir George Devereux, of Lamphey
- 1581: Griffith White, of Henllan
- 1582: John ap Rhys, of Rickeston, Brawdy
- 1583: St Hugh Owen, Kt, of Orielton
- 1584: John Wogan, of Boulston
- 1585: John Elliot, of Narberth
- 1586: Rowland Laugharne, of St Brides
- 1587: George Owen, of Henllys
- 1588: Henry Adams, of Peterchurch
- 1589: Thomas Jones, of Harroldston
- 1590: Alban Stepney, of Prendergast
- 1591: Edmund Winstanley, of St Dogmaels
- 1592: Henry White of Henllan
- 1593: John ap Rhys, of Rickeston
- 1594: Walter Vaughan of St Brides and Golden Grove, Carmarthenshire
- 1595: John Philipps, of Picton Castle
- 1596: John Lloyd, of Kilkiffeth
- 1597: Thomas Parry, of St Dogmaels
- 1598: John Wogan, of Boulston
- 1599: Hugh Butler, of Johnstone
- 1600: John Scourfield, of New Moat

=== 17th Century ===
- 1601: Devereux Barrett, of Tenby
- 1602: George Owen, of Henllys
- 1603: James Bowen, of Trefloyne (Trellwyn)
- 1604: Henry White, of Henllan
- 1605: Alban Stepney, of Prendergast
- 1606: Sir John Wogan, of Boulston (son of John Wogan of Boulston)
- 1607: Roger Lort, of Stackpole Court
- 1608: John Butler, of Coedcanlas
- 1609: Owen Elliot, of Narberth
- 1610: Thomas ap Rees, of Scotsborough
- 1611: John Philipps, of Picton Castle
- 1612: William Barlow, of Criswell
- 1613: Thomas Lloyd, of Kilkiffeth
- 1614: John Stepney, of Prendergast
- 1615: Richard Cuney, of Lamphey
- 1616: Devereux Barrett, of Tenby
- 1617: William Scourfield, of New Moat
- 1618: George Barlow, of Slebech Park
- 1619: Henry Lort of Stackpole
- 1620: Alban Owen of Henllys
- 1621: Alban Philipps, of Nash
- 1622: John Philipps, of Pentre Park
- 1623: Sir John Carew, Kt, of Carew Castle
- 1624: James Bowen, of Llywngwair
- 1625: John Lloyd, of Hendre
- 1626: John Laugharne, of Tenby
- 1627: Griffith White, of Henllan
- 1628: George Bowen, of Trefloyne (Trellwyn)
- 1629: David Thomas Parry, of Noyadd Trefawr and David Parry (his gtandson)
- 1630: Sir John Wogan, of Boulston
- 1631: John Laugharne, of St Brides
- 1632: George Bowen, of Llwyngwair
- 1633: Sir Richard Philipps, Bt of Picton Castle
- 1634: Hugh Owen, of Orielton
- 1635: John Scourfield, of New Moat
- 1636: Sir John Wogan, of Wiston Castle (grandson of John Wogan of Wiston)
- 1637: Sir John Stepney, 3rd Baronet
- 1638: John Philipps, of Ffynnon-gain
- 1639: Thomas Warren of Trewern
- 1640: George Carew, of Carew Castle
- 1641: Lewis Barlow, of Criswell
- 1642: James Lewis, of Kilkiffeth
- 1643: Alban Owen, of Henllys
- 1644-1645: Thomas Butler, of Scoveston
- 1646: William Philipps of Haythog
- 1647: John Lloyd, of Llanfymach
- 1648: Abraham Wogan, of Boulston (grandson of Sir John Wogan of Boulston)
- 1649: Arnold Thomas of Haverfordwest
- 1650: Samson Lort, of East Meare
- 1651: James Philips, of Tref-gib, Carmarthenshire
- 1652: Roger Lort, of Stackpole Court (later Sir Roger Lort, 1st Baronet)
- 1653: John Lort of Prickeston
- 1654: Sir Hugh Owen, 1st Baronet of Orielton
- 1655: James ap Rhys of Rickeston
- 1656: Sir Erasmus Philipps of Picton Castle
- 1657: Richard Walter of Roch Castle
- 1658: Henry White of Henllan
- 1659–1660: George Haward of Fletherhill
- 1661: James Lloyd of Cilrhiw
- 1662: David Morgan of Coedllwyd
- 1663: William Scourfield of New Moat and Sir Hugh Owen, 2nd Baronet of Landshipping
- 1664: Griffith Davies of Bangeston
- 12 November 1665: Sir Herbert Perrott, of Wellington
- 7 November 1666: Thomas Philips, of Trellewellyn
- 6 November 1667: Lewis Barlow, of Creswell
- 6 November 1668: James Lewis, of Coedmore and Cilciffeth
- 1669: Thomas Lloyd of Morvil
- 11 November 1669: John Williams, of Gumfreston
- 4 November 1670: James Bowen, of Llwyngwair
- 9 November 1671: Lewis Wogan, of Boulston (son of Abraham Wogan)
- 11 November 1672: Thomas Lort
- 1673: William Meares of Eastington
- 12 November 1673: William Warren, of Trewern
- 18 November 1674: Nicolas Roch, of Richardson in Rhoose
- 15 November 1675: Thomas Lort
- 1676: Lewis John of Penlan
- 10 November 1676: David Morris Griffith Beynon, of Fynnone
- 17 November 1677: Reynald Lewis
- 1678: Francis Phillips of Waingron
- 13 November 1679: Thomas Jones, of Wenallt, Newport
- 4 November 1680: Sir John Barlow, 1st Baronet, of Slebech Park
- 1682: George Bowen of Llwyngwair
- 1683: David Williams of Hen Castle
- 1684: John Owen of New Moat and Trecwn, Llanfairnantygof
- 1685: David Morgan of Coedllwyd
- 1686: John Barlow of Creswell
- 1687: Charles Philips of Sandyhaven
- 1688: Lewis Barlow of Creswell
- 1689: William Lucy of Carew
- 1690: Griffith Hawkwell of Llawhaden
- 1691: Edward Phillips of Kilgetty
- 1692: George Meares of Easington
- 1693: William Allen of Gellyswick
- 1694: David Parry of Noyadd Trefawr
- 1695: Francis Meares of Corston
- 1696: Thomas Lloyd of Cilgelynan and George Lloyd of Cwmgloyn
- 1697: Sir Thomas Stepney, 5th Baronet of Prendergast
- 1698: Hugh Bowen of Upton
- 1699: William Scourfield of New Moat
- 1700: Thomas Lloyd (or Lewis) of Grove

=== 18th Century ===
- 1701: Hugh Lloyd of Ffoshelyg
- 1702: John Edwardes of Treffgarne
- 1703: Julius Deedes of St Dogmaels
- 1704: Simon Willy of Lampeter Velfrey
- 1705: John Barlow of Lawrenny
- 1706: George Owen of Priskilly
- 1707: Sir Arthur Owen, 3rd Baronet of Orielton
- 1708: Sir William Lewis of Bristol
- 1709: Thomas Lloyd of Grove
- 1710: John Vaughan of Trecwn
- 1711: Morris Morris of Ffynone
- 1712: John Warren of Trewern
- 1713: John Symmons of Llanstinan
- 1714: Charles Owen of Great Nash
- 1715: John Symmons of Llanstinan
- 1716: John Skyrme of Llawhaden
- 1717: Lewis Vaughan, of Jordanston, Fishguard
- 1718: Thomas Parry, Of Manorowen
- 1719: William Wheeler, of Haverfordwest
- 1720: Richard Lowe, of Linney
- 1721: Stephen Lewis, of Llangolman
- 1722: Lawrence Colby, of Bletherstone
- 1723: John Lort, of Prickeston
- 1724: William Wogan, of Wiston Castle
- 1725: John Child, of Begelly
- 1726: David Lewis, of Vogart or Llandewi
- 1727: Sir Richard Walter, Kt, of Rhos Market
- 1728: Robert Popkins, of Forest
- 1729: Nicholas Roch, of Prickeston
- 1730: James Lloyd, of Kilrhue
- 1731: John Laugharne, of Llanrythan
- 1732: John Allen of Cresselly
- 1733: Nicholas Roch, of Prickeston
- 1734: James Philipps, of Pentrepark
- 1735: John Philipps, of Ford
- 1736: William Philipps, of Sandy Haven
- 1737: Thomas Davies, of Nash
- 1738: George Harries, of Tregwynt
- 1739: George Meare, of Pennar
- 1740: William Warren, of Longridge
- 1741: Matthew Bowen, of Westfield
- 1742: William Allen, of Gelliswick
- 1743: David Paynter, of Dale
- 1744: William Jones, of Llether
- 1745: John Wogan, of Wiston, Pembrokeshire
- 1746: Morris Bowen, of Upton Castle
- 1747: Rowland Edwards, of Tref-garn
- 1748: John Wogan, of Boulston
- 1749: Thomas Picton, of Poyston
- 1750: Sparks Martin, of Withybush
- 1751: Hugh Meare, of Pearston
- 1752: John Owen, of Berllan
- 1753: George Barlow, of Slebech Park
- 1754: Essex Marychurch Meyrick, of Bush
- 1755: John Smith, of Jeffreyston
- 1756: John Hook, of Bangeston
- 1757: John Allen, of Dale
- 1758: John Adams, of Whitland
- 1759: Thomas Jones, of Brawdy
- 1760: Thomas Roch, of Butter Hill
- 1761: Rowland Philipps Laugharne, of Orlandon
- 1762: William Wheeler Bowen, of Lambston
- 1763: John Tucker, of Sealyham
- 1764: William Ford, of Stone Hall
- 1765: John Francis Meyrick, of Bush
- 1766: William Williams, of Ivy Tower
- 1767: Council Williams, of Hermon's Hill, Haverfordwest
- 1768: John Griffiths, of Clynderwen
- 1769: Thomas Skyrme, of Vaynor
- 1770: Thomas Colby, of Rhosygilwen
- 1771: Thomas Lloyd, of Cwmgloyne
- 1772: John Parry, of Port Clew
- 1773: John Jones, of Brawdy
- 1774: Caesar Mathias, of Hook
- 1775: John Lort, of Prickeston
- 1776: John Harries, of Cryg-glas
- 1777: Nicholas Roch, of Prickeston
- 1778: John Harries, of Gryg-glas
- 1779: John Griffiths, of Llancych
- 1780: Thomas (or James) Lloyd, of Kilrhue
- 1781: Henry Scourfield, of Robeston
- 1782: Vaughan Thomasm of Posty, Bletherston
- 1783: Thomas Wright, of Post Hill
- 1784: John Protheroe of Egremont
- 1785: John Lloyd, of Dale Castle
- 1786: William Knox, of Slebech
- 1787: James Phillips, of Pentre Park
- 1788: John Philipps Laugharne of Orlandon
- 1789: George Roch, of Clareston
- 1790: William Philipps, of St Brides
- 1791: William Wheeler Bowen, of Lambston
- 1792: John Mathias, of Llangwarren
- 1793: John Higgon, of Scolton
- 1794: John Phelps, of Withybush
- 1795: John Herbert Foley, of Ridgeway
- 1796: Nathaniel Philipps, of Slebech Park
- 1797: Abraham Leach, of Corston
- 1798: John Tasker, of Upton Castle
- 1799: Gwynn Vaughan, of Jordanston
- 1800: John Meares, of Eastington

=== 19th Century ===
- 11 February 1801: Morgan Jones, of Cilwendeg
- 3 February 1802: David Lewis, of Hen Llan
- 17 February 1802: Hugh Stokes, of Hubberston
- 3 February 1803: George Bowen, of Llwyngwair
- 1 February 1804: Sir Hugh Owen, 6th Baronet, of Orielton
- 6 February 1805: George Harries, of Priskelly
- 21 February 1805: John Hill Harries, of Priskelly
- 1 February 1806: Hugh Webb Bowen, of Camrose
- 4 February 1807: John Colby, of Ffynone
- 3 February 1808: John Hensleigh Allen, of Cresselly House
- 6 February 1809: Charles Allen Philipps, of the Hill
- 31 January 1810: John Mirehouse, of Brownslade
- 8 February 1811: Lewis Mathias, of Llangwarren
- 24 January 1812: William Henry Scourfield, of Robeston Hall
- 10 February 1813: Gwynne Gill Vaughan, of Jordanston
- 4 February 1814: John Harcourt Powell, of Hook
- 13 February 1815: Maurice Williams, of Cwm Gloyn
- 1816: Sir Henry Mathias of Fernhill
- 1817: Charles D Mathias of Llangwarren
- 1818: Robert Innes Ackland of Boulston
- 1819: Henry Davies of Trewarren
- 1820: Nathaniel Phillips of Slebech Park
- 1821: Joseph Harries of Llanunwas
- 1822: John Meares of Plas Llanstephan
- 1823: Owen Lewis of Trewern
- 1824: Orlando Harris of Ivy Tower
- 1825: George Bowen of Llwyn-y-Gwair
- 1826: Jonathan Haworth Peel of Cotts
- 1827: Anthony Innys Stokes of Scoveston
- 1828: Thomas Meyrick of Bush
- 1829: William Tucker Edwardes
- 1830: Anthony Abel Gower, of Kilderweon was initially appointed, but was replaced by George Clayton Roch, of Clareston
- 1831: John Mirehouse, of Brownslade was initially appointed, but was replaced by Morgan Jones, of Kilwendeage
- 1832: David Davies, of Caernachernwen
- 1833: John Henry Philipps, of Williamston
- 1834: John Barham of Trecwn
- 1835: Nicholas Roch, of Cocheston
- 1836: Charles Wheeler Townsend Webb Bowen, of Camrose
- 1837: John Adams, of Holyland
- 1838: John Colby of Ffynone
- 1839: Gilbert William Warren Davis, of Mullock
- 1840: Richard Llewellyn, of Tregwynt
- 1841: George Roch, of Butterhill
- 1842: Robert Frederick Gower, of Glandofan
- 1843: George Lort Phillips, of Dumpledale
- 1844: William Charles Allen Philipps, of St Bride's Hill
- 1845: Abel Lewis Gower, of Castlemalgwynne
- 1846: John Harding Harries, of Trevaccoon
- 1847: William Henry Lewis, of Clynfiew
- 1848: Owen Owen, of Cwmgloyne
- 1849: Seymour Phillips Allen, of Cresselly House
- 1850: William Richards, of Tenby
- 1851: John Harcourt Powell, of Hook
- 1852: Henry Leach, of Corston
- 1853: Adrian Nicholas John Stokes, St Botolphs
- 1854: Hon. Robert Fulke Greville, of Castle Hall
- 1855: John Leach, of Ivy Tower
- 1856: Lewis Mathias, of Lamphey Court
- 1857: Sir James John Hamilton, 2nd Baronet, of Fishguard
- 1858: Nicholas John Dunn, of Westmoor
- 1859: William Owen, of Poyston
- 1860: George Augustus Harries, of Hilton
- 1861: Edward Wilson, of Hean Castle
- 1862: James Bevan Bowen, of Llwyngwair, Newport
- 1863: William Rees, of Scoveston
- 1864: Thomas Harcourt Powell, of Hook
- 1865: Thomas Henry Davis, of Clareston
- 1866: William Walters, of Haverfordwest
- 1867: Mark Anthony Saurin, of Orielton
- 1868: George Richards Graham Rees, of Penllwyn
- 1869: Robert Pavin Davies, of Ridgway
- 1870: Morris Williams Lloyd Owen, of Cwmgloyne
- 1871: Frederick Leopold Sapieha Manteuffel de Rutzen (commonly called Baron Frederick de Rutzen), of Slebech Park
- 1872: Richard Edward Arden, of Pontfaen
- 1873: Henry Seymour Allen, of Cresselly House
- 1874: James Bowen Summers
- 1875: John Taubman William James of Pantsaison
- 1876: Charles Bird Allen of Tenby
- 1877: Thomas C. Meyrick, of Bangeston House, near Pembroke
- 1878: William Henry Richards, of Tenby
- 1879: William Francis Roch, of Butterhill
- 1880: John Frederick Lort-Philips of Lawrenny Castle
- 1881: Sir Owen Henry Philipps Scourfield, of Williamston
- 1882: Charles Edward Gregg Philipps, of Picton Castle
- 1883: Morgan James Saurin, of Orielton
- 1884: James Taylor Hawksley, of Caldy Island
- 1885: Lieutenant – Colonel Henry Leach, of Corston
- 1886: Lieut-Col Richard W.B. Mirehouse of Angle (1849-1914)
- 1887: Frederick Lewis Lloyd-Philipps, of Penty Park
- 1888: Arthur Picton Saunders Davies, of Pentre, Boncath
- 1889: John Donald George Higgon, of Scolton
- 1890: Charles Mathias, of Lamphey Court

=== Administrative county ===
- 1891: John Vaughan Colby, of Cresborough
- 1892: Gilbert David Harries, of Llanunwas
- 1893: Louis Samson, of Scotchwell
- 1894: George Leader Owen of Withybush
- 1895: Rudolph William Henry Ehrard de Rutzen (The Baron de Rutzen), of Slebech Park.
- 1896: James Charles Yorke, of Trecwn
- 1897: Clement John Williams, of Penally
- 1898: William Howell Walters, of Haroldston Hall
- 1899: Edward Laws, of Brython Place, Tenby
- 1900: John Evans, of Welston, near Pembroke

=== 20th Century ===
- 1901: George Powell Roch, of Butter Hill, Milford Haven
- 1902: Henry Owen, of Poyston
- 1903: Percy Arden, of Pontfaen House
- 1904: Owen Cosby Philipps, Baron Kylsant of Amroth Castle
- 1905: Henry Hills-Goudeve, of Ivy Tower, near Tenby
- 1906: Rhodri Yaughan Lloyd Philipps, of Dale Castle, Dale
- 1907: Herbert Clarke Lewis, of Hean Castle, Saundersfoot
- 1908: Richard Poyer Lewis Penn, of Camrose House, Camrose
- 1909: Herbert James Allen, of 10, Norton, Tenby
- 1910: John Harcourt Powell, of Regent's Park, London, and Williamston, Carew
- 1911: Sir Evan Davies Jones, 1st Baronet
- 1912: Richard Llewellin Lloyd of Pentyparc, Clarbeston Road
- 1913: Samuel Keith Harries, of Hilton, Roch
- 1914: Sir George Bevan Bowen of Llwyngwair
- 1915: William-Bird Allen, of London
- 1916: Colonel William Robert Roberts, of Hamilton House, Milford Haven.
- 1917: Charles Henry Ranken Vickerman, of St. Issella House, Saundersfoot
- 1918: David Harrison, of The Grove, Tenby
- 1919: Colonel Newton Seymour Allen, of Paskeston, Milton, Pembroke
- 1920: William Henry Montagu Leeds, of Heywood Mount, Tenby
- 1921: Sir Edward Aurelian Ridsdale, of Waterwynoh, Tenby
- 1922: James Luther Greenway, of Greenway Manor, Nantmel, Rhayader, Radnor
- 1923: Major William Mark Saurin, of Trevor Square, London
- 1924: Major Sir Hugh James Protheroe Thomas, of Castle Hall, Milford Haven, Kt.,
- 1925: Lieut.-Col. James Charles Herbert Crosland of Colby Lodge, Kilgetty
- 1926: Brigadier-General Sir Frederick Charlton Meyrick, of Bush, Pembroke
- 1927: Capt. John Hamilton Howell of Trewellwell, Solva
- 1928: Kenneth Walker of Boulston, Haverfordwest
- 1929: Major Antony Vaughan William Stokes, of St. Botolphs, Milford Haven
- 1930: Major Herbert Charles Goodeve Allen, of Clover Hill, Tenby
- 1931: Victor James Higgon, of Treffgarne Hall, Treffgarne, Pembrokeshire
- 1932: Algernon Stokes Mathias, of Llangwarren, Letterston, Pembrokeshire
- 1933: Brigadier-General Henry Edmund Burleigh Leach, of Corston, Pembroke
- 1934: Capt. Sir Henry Erasmus Edward Philipps, of Tregeyb, Llandilo, Bt
- 1935: Lieut.-Col. George Burnet Abercrombie Rind, of Allenbrook, Dale
- 1936: Edmund William Bowlas Summers, of Rosemoor, Walwyn's Castle, Haverfordwest
- 1937: Charles Ronald Mathias, of Lamphey Court, Lamphey
- 1938: Capt. Sir Thomas Frederick Meyrick, of Bush, Pembroke, Bt
- 1939: Daniel Daniel of Ffynone, Boncath
- 1940: Robert Albert Wheatley, of Bunker's Hill, Milford Haven
- 1941: Sackville Herbert Edward Gregg Owen, of Hill, Narberth
- 1942: Sir John Erasmus Gwynne Alexander Philipps, of Picton Castle, Haverfordwest, Bt
- 1943: Arthur Graham Gaddum, of Orielton, Pembroke
- 1944: Capt. Henry Gordon Gooch Ashton, of Welston Court, Milton, Tenby
- 1945: Major Richard Charles Edward Barclay, of Elm Grove, St. Florence
- 1946: Hugh Royds Stokes Massy
- 1947: Captain John Francis Vickerman of Saundersfoot, Pembroke
- 1948: Bertram Wedgwood Allen of Cwmderwen, Narberth
- 1949: Air Vice-Marshal Sir Tom Ince Webb-Bowen of Hillborough House, Haverfordwest
- 1950: Dyfrig Huws Pennant, of Bonvilles Court, Saundersfoot.
- 1951: Lieut-Colonel John Henry Victor Higgon of Scolton, Haverfordwest
- 1952: Brigadier George Adrien Pim of Wyncliffe, St. Davids, Pembrokeshire.
- 1953: Major David Harrison-Allen, of Cresselly, Kilgetty, Pembrokeshire
- 1954: Lieut.-Colonel Patrick Herbert Lort Phillips, of Lawrenny, Kilgetty, Pembrokeshire.
- 1955: Sir James Frederick Rees, of 3, Hill Park, Tenby.
- 1956: Norman Stuart Perkins of St. Lawrence, Fishguard.
- 1957: Joseph Edward Gibby of Upton Farm, Perabroke Dock
- 1958: Colonel George Trevor Kelway, of St. Annes, Milford Haven.
- 1959: Lieut.-Colonel Brian Granville Blayney Mitchell, of Manor House, Wiston, Clarbeston Road.
- 1960: Lieut.-Colonel George Leonard Hughes, of Pencraig, Sladeway, Fishguard.
- 1961: Lieut.-Colonel Christopher Francis Fothergill, of The Old Rectory, The Norton, Tenby.
- 1962: James John Simon Yorke of Langton, Dwrbaoh, Fishguard
- 1963: Michael Richard Lloyd Hayes of Four Ashes, Cosheston, Pembroke Dock
- 1964: Lieut.-Colonel Richard Francis Foster of Hill Street, Haverfordwest.
- 1965: Wing Commander Lewis Mathias of Lamphey Court, Lamphey
- 1966: Burnet Henry George Rind, of Allenbrook, Dale, Haverfordwest.
- 1967: Peter James Perkins, of Longhouse, Mathry, Haverfordwest.
- 1968: William Speke Philipps, of Slebech Park, Haverfordwest.
- 1969: Major Ivor Basil Ramsden, of Mayeston House, Cosheston, Pembroke Dock.
- 1970: Lieut.-Colonel John Frederick Webb Green, of Bilton Cottage, Haverfordwest.
- 1971: Henry Graham Partridge, of Parc-y-Pratt, Cardigan.
- 1972: Richard Wilfrid Arthur Foyer Lewis, of Carmaenau Fawr, Clynderwen.
- 1973: Joe David Perkins, of Trefelyn, Mathry.
The post was abolished in 1974 and replaced with that of High Sheriff of Dyfed.
