= William Wogan =

William Wogan may refer to:

- William Wogan (Custos Rotulorum) (died 1625), Custos Rotulorum of Pembrokeshire
- William Wogan (politician) (c.1638–1708), Welsh judge and Member of Parliament
- William Wogan (religious writer) (1678–1758), Irish religious writer
