= David Burton-Richardson =

British artist

David Burton-Richardson (born 1961) is a Welsh artist and poet. He has works in many public and private collections worldwide. The David Burton-Richardson Collection and Archive is housed at Scolton Manor museum near Haverfordwest, Pembrokeshire. The publication 'From Now to Zero' is housed within the library collections of the Tate Gallery, National Library of Wales and the Kohler Art Library, Wisconsin, USA. In more recent years he has been inspired by the Welsh Valleys, which inspire his abstract works.

Upon the death of his grandfather, who left him his art materials, when the artist was 11 years old, Burton-Richardson started to paint in oils on a serious basis. To see that box of oil paints and brushes was like a child opening a box of sweets, he said.

Having suffered anxiety, self-doubt and depression since childhood, Burton-Richardson has periods where he is unable to work. A culmination of illness led him to create what he called 'The Psychiatric Works', when a Psychologist urged him to paint the Demons within his mind. This collection of work was donated to Pembrokeshire MIND for permanent display within their building. The artist desired them to be displayed within an environment conducive to his state of mind when creating them.

Early works were often urban landscapes and were signed 'D.B', 'David Burton' or just 'Burton', often followed by the year they were painted. Later works are signed 'dB.R and 'David Burton.R' on verso.

Recent works have been more sombre and melancholic in colour and mood, with the emphasis being on the darker side of life. As in the words of the artist -- I am into infinity. Time and Space being infinite, endless. When you are dead time is infinite. Everything is black. Death is black. Black is the colour of death.

- Elected full member of the National Acrylic Painters Association (NAPA), 2004.
- Numerous one-man exhibitions, press, magazine and TV coverage.
- Several one-man exhibitions held at Pontypool Museum and Art Gallery.
- A retrospective exhibition was held at Scolton Manor museum in 2005.
- David Burton-Richardson is listed in the publication 'Who's Who in Art', 'The Dictionary of International Biography', '2000 Outstanding Intellectuals of the 21st Century' and the 'Dictionary of International Biographies', Printed in the USA.
