= Lamphey Cricket Club Ground =

Cricket ground in Lamphey, Pembrokeshire, England

Coordinates: 51°40′05.14″N 4°52′06.15″W

- Interactive map of Lamphey Cricket Club Ground

Ground information
- Location: Lamphey, Pembrokeshire
- Country: Wales
- Establishment: 1995 (first recorded match)

Team information
| Wales Minor Counties | (2002 & 2004) |
- As of 15 August 2010; Source: Ground profile

Lamphey Cricket Club Ground is a cricket ground in Lamphey, Pembrokeshire. The first recorded match on the ground was in 1995, when Pembrokeshire Under-19 played Glamorgan Under-19. In 2002, Wales Minor Counties played a Minor Counties Championship match at the ground against Berkshire, the only Minor Counties Championship match on the ground to date. Formers players who went on to play Test Cricket, Vasbert Drakes and Brendon Nash .

The ground has also held a single List-A match in the 2004 Cheltenham & Gloucester Trophy which saw Wales Minor Counties against Middlesex.

In local domestic cricket, Lamphey Cricket Club Ground is the home ground of Lamphey Cricket Club.
