= James Perrot =

Welsh writer and politician (1571-1636)

Sir James Perrot (1571 – 4 February 1636) was a Welsh writer and politician who sat in the House of Commons at various times between 1597 and 1629.

He was the illegitimate son of Sir John Perrot, who was himself falsely rumoured to be an illegitimate son of Henry VIII. Perrot is now thought to have been born at Westmead Mansion in the Lordship of Laugharne, Carms. where he lived with his mother, Sybil Jones and sister Mary until moving to the ancestral family home at Haroldston near Havefordwest sometime after 1597 when he finally secured its lease by proxy. The actual date of the move is unknown but was probably before his marriage to Mary Ashfield in 1602. It was enabled by the partial settlement of a protracted legal dispute with his legitimate half-brother's widow over his father's estates which continued until her death in 1619. The battle in court over his patrimony was then carried on by his father's uncle Thomas Perrot of Brook (adjacent to the Westmead) and later by John Laugharne of St Brides, the son of Sir John's daughter Lettice. Perrot spent two years at Jesus College, Oxford, from 1586, when he was aged 14, and became a member of Middle Temple in 1590. In 1597, he was elected Member of Parliament for Haverfordwest.

Perrot wrote Discovery of Discontented Minds (1596) and The First Part of the Considerations of Humane Conditions (1600). He also wrote, in later life, Meditations and Prayers on the Lord's Prayer and Ten Commandments (1630).

Perrot was Custos Rotulorum of Pembrokeshire between 1601 and sometime after 1608. He was knighted in 1603 and was first on the list of aldermen when Haverfordwest received its charter at the beginning of the reign of James I. In 1604, he was elected MP for Haverfordwest again, and subsequently re-elected in 1614 and 1621. In the 1621 Parliament, Perrot was a prominent critic of the proposed marriage between Prince Charles and Maria Anna, Infanta of Spain and lost royal favour. He was honourably banished to Ireland with a position in the commission of enquiry being held by Sir Dudley Digges. In 1624 he was elected MP for Pembrokeshire and in the same year he leased the royal mines in Pembrokeshire. Perrot was elected MP for Haverfordwest again in 1626 and 1628. He served as deputy vice-admiral, then vice-admiral, for the Earl of Pembroke. He advocated action against wreckers and the fortification of Milford Haven, and subscribed £37 10s to the Virginia Company.

Perrot died in 1636 and was buried in St Mary's Church, Haverfordwest.

Parliament of England
Preceded by Sir Nicholas Clifford	Member of Parliament for Haverfordwest; 1597	Succeeded by John Canon
Preceded by John Canon	Member of Parliament for Haverfordwest; 1604–1622	Succeeded by Lewis Powell
Preceded by Sir John Wogan	Member of Parliament for Pembrokeshire; 1624	Succeeded by Sir John Wogan
Preceded by Sir Thomas Canon	Member of Parliament for Haverfordwest; 1626–1629	Parliament suspended until 1640
Political offices
Preceded by The Earl of Essex	Custos Rotulorum of Pembrokeshire; 1601–after 1608	Succeeded by Sir William Wogan
