= Scolton Manor =

Country house in Pembrokeshire, Wales

Coordinates: 51°51′38.27″N 4°55′13.65″W

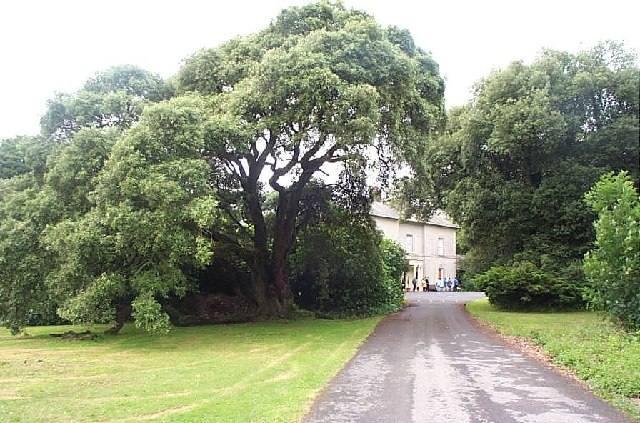
Approach to Scolton Manor

Scolton Manor is a Victorian country house and country park located in Pembrokeshire, West Wales northeast of Haverfordwest and on the borders of the Pembrokeshire Coast National Park. Built as a home, it is now a museum and is a Grade II* listed building. The stable court, some 120 m (130 yd) to the north, is also a Grade II listed building and both are owned by Pembrokeshire County Council. The gardens and parkland are listed on the Cadw/ICOMOS Register of Parks and Gardens of Special Historic Interest in Wales. The house, grounds and a number of exhibits are open to the public.

== History ==
Designed by local architects William and James Owen, Scolton Manor was built in 1840 and occupied from 1842 by the Higgon family. The house replaced a former building owned by the same family, which had burned down in the mid-eighteenth century. Prominent amongst Pembrokeshire society, three Higgon family members held the position of High Sheriff of Pembrokeshire, including the last resident, Lt Col John Henry Victor Higgon (1902–1987). It is a country house built in a neo-classical style, with unpainted stucco, with a slated, hipped roofs and flat overhanging eaves.

Taken over by Pembrokeshire County Council, the grounds have become a country park and the house has been restored. Both are open to the public. Scolton Manor is home to Pembrokeshire's County Museum Service.

== Exhibitions ==
=== House and outbuildings ===
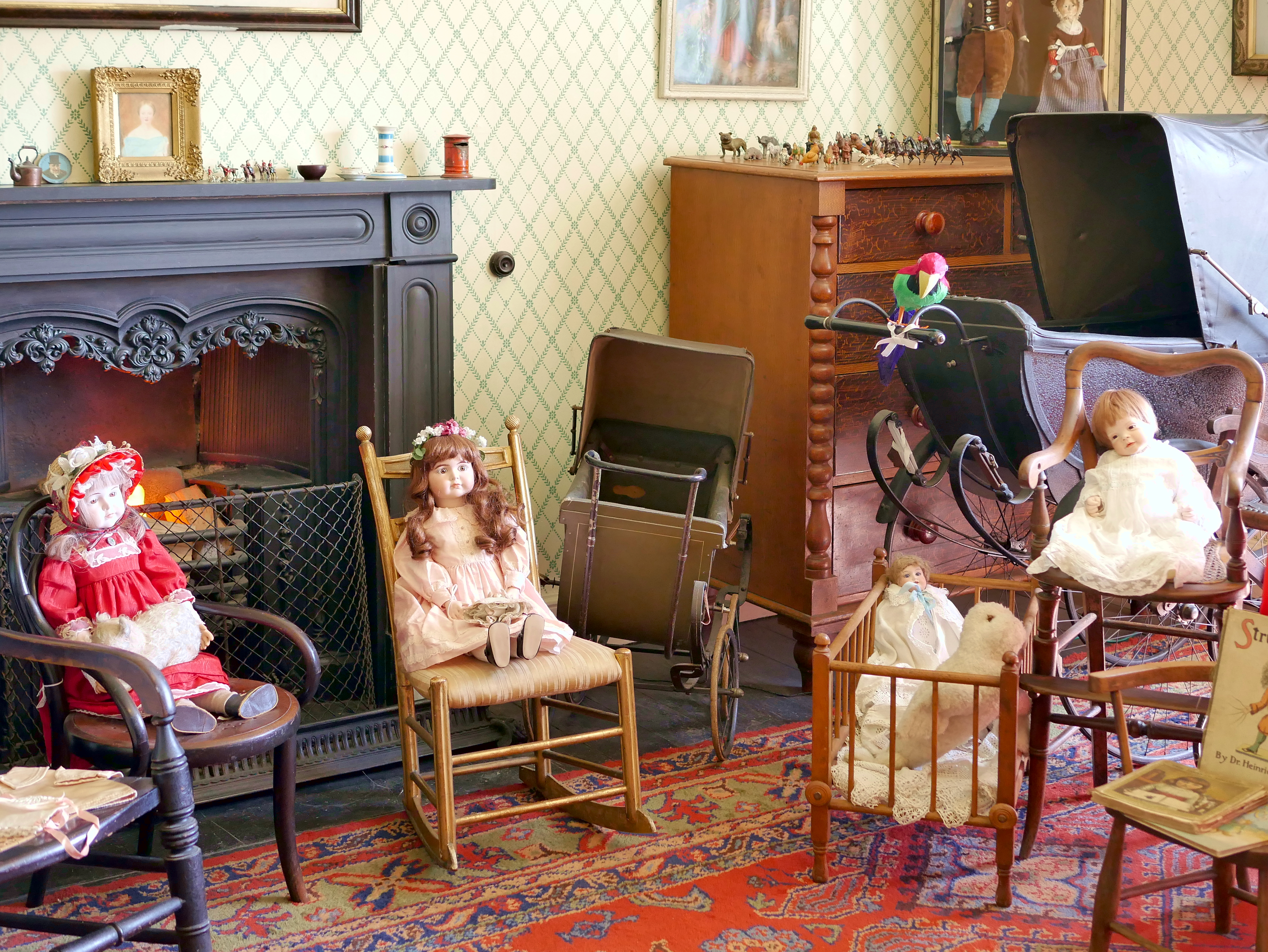
Nursery

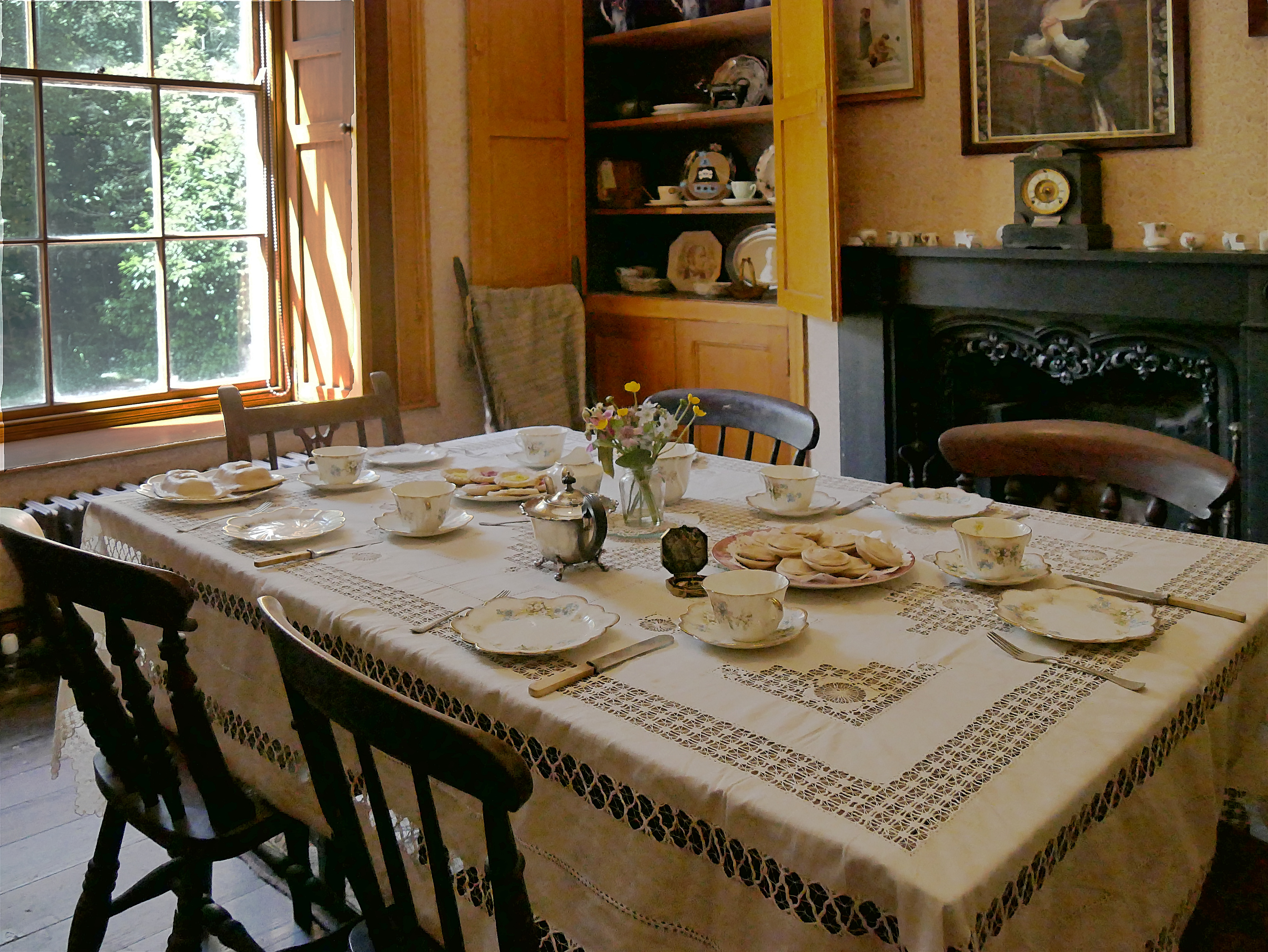
Dining room

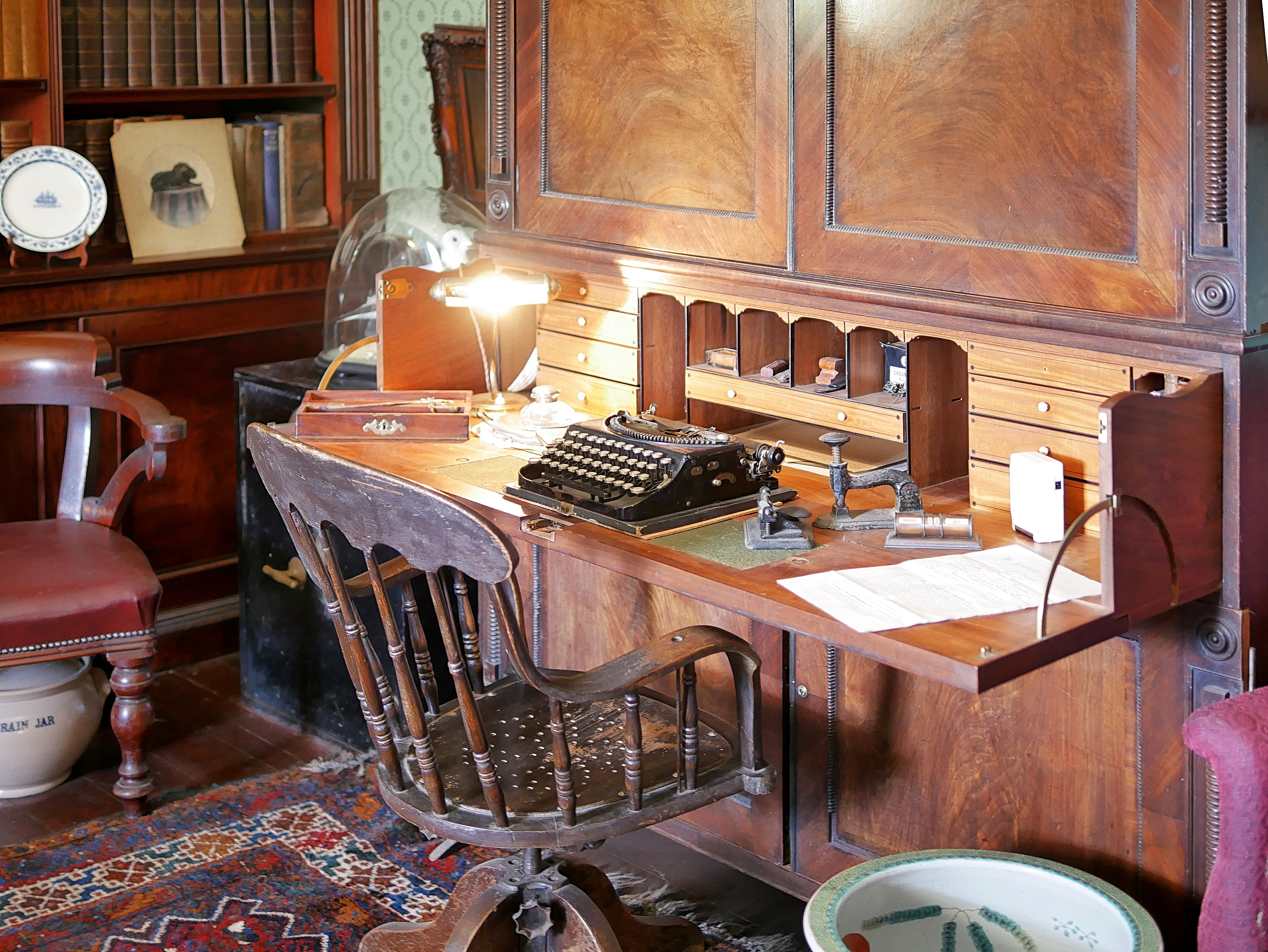
Study

The exhibition hall displays the broad-ranging history of Pembrokeshire including natural history, geology, employment and trade, life during World War II and the Gwalia stores. The David Burton-Richardson Collection and Archive of paintings, drawings and artefacts relating to the artist's life is housed at Scolton Manor Museum. "From Now to Zero", a retrospective exhibition of David Burton-Richardson's works was held in 2005.

The outbuildings display collections reflecting Pembrokeshire country life, including stables and carriages, the traditional skills of carpenter and blacksmith, the relationship between the poacher and gamekeeper and a Gulbenkian-nominated VARDA gypsy caravan.

=== Grounds ===
The grounds include a Victorian walled garden, the Pembrokeshire Beekeeping Centre, opened in July 2014 at the same time as the inauguration of the walled garden, a pineapple house, which in 2018 produced what is believed to be the first pineapple grown in Wales for over 100 years and Margaret, a Fox Walker & Co 0-6-0 locomotive supplied to the Maenclochog and Rosebush railway in 1878. The gardens and parkland are designated Grade II on the Cadw/ICOMOS Register of Parks and Gardens of Special Historic Interest in Wales.
