= John Wogan =

Welsh politician (1588–1644)

Sir John Wogan (1588–1644) was a Welsh politician who sat in the House of Commons at various times between 1614 and 1644.

Wogan was the son of Sir William Wogan of Wiston, Pembrokeshire, and his wife Sybil Owen, the daughter of Sir Hugh Owen of Orielton, and grandson of John Wogan. He matriculated at Jesus College, Oxford on 20 November 1607 aged 19.

In 1614 he was elected Member of Parliament for Pembrokeshire, and was re-elected in 1620. In 1624 he was defeated and petitioned unsuccessfully. He was elected MP for Pembrokeshire again in 1625, 1626 and 1628 and sat until 1629 when King Charles decided to rule without parliament for eleven years. He was appointed High Sheriff of Pembrokeshire for 1635–36.

In April 1640 Wogan was elected MP for Pembrokeshire in the Short Parliament. He was re-elected MP for Pembrokeshire for the Long Parliament in November 1640 and sat until his death in 1644.

Wogan's son, Thomas Wogan, was one of the regicides of Charles I.

Parliament of England
Preceded by Alban Stepney	Member of Parliament for Pembrokeshire; 1614–1622	Succeeded by Sir James Perrott
Preceded by Sir James Perrott	Member of Parliament for Pembrokeshire; 1625–1629	Parliament suspended until 1640
Vacant Parliament suspended since 1629	Member of Parliament for Pembrokeshire; 1640–1644	Succeeded by Arthur Owen
