= Lamphey Court =

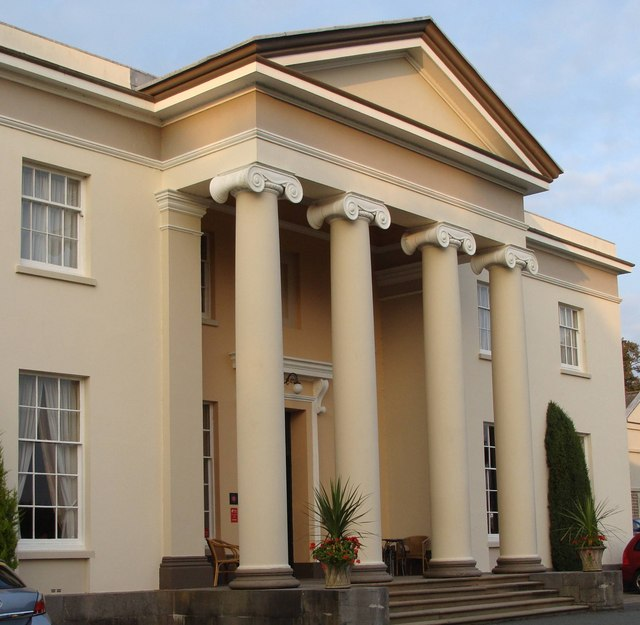

- Location within Pembrokeshire
- 51.6736°N 4.8691°W
- Type: mansion
- Location: Pembrokeshire, Wales
- OS grid reference: SN 0171 0110

History
- Built: 1823

Listed Building – Grade II*
- Official name: Lamphey Court
- Designated: 14 May 1970
- Reference no.: 5968
- Community: Lamphey

Lamphey Court is a Greek revival mansion north of the village of Lamphey, Pembrokeshire, South Wales built in 1823 by Charles Delamotte Mathias. It was designated at Grade II* in 1970 as an important Greek revival house of high architectural quality. After restorations and extensions Lamphey Court was re-opened by the present owners in 1980. It currently operates as a Best Western hotel.

The main facade is two storeys high and seven bays wide. A full height four column Ionic portico occupies the three centre bays which are recessed behind the columns. The whole is rendered and whitened and the low hipped slate roofs are concealed behind a plain parapet. The gardens and park are listed, jointly with the garden at Lamphey Bishop's Palace, as Grade II* on the Cadw/ICOMOS Register of Parks and Gardens of Special Historic Interest in Wales.
