= Wiston Castle =

- Castell Cas-wis (Welsh)
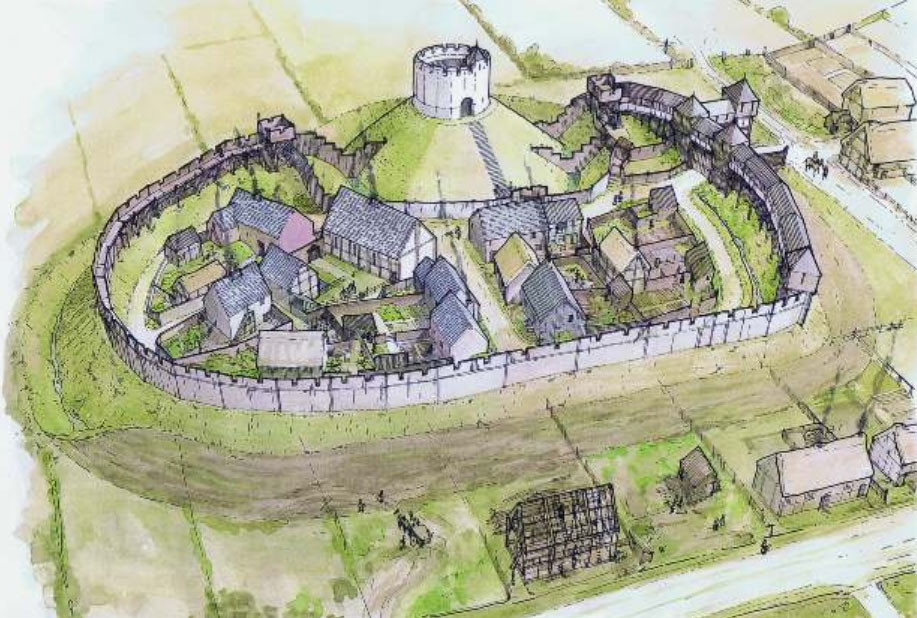
- Wiston Castle reconstruction

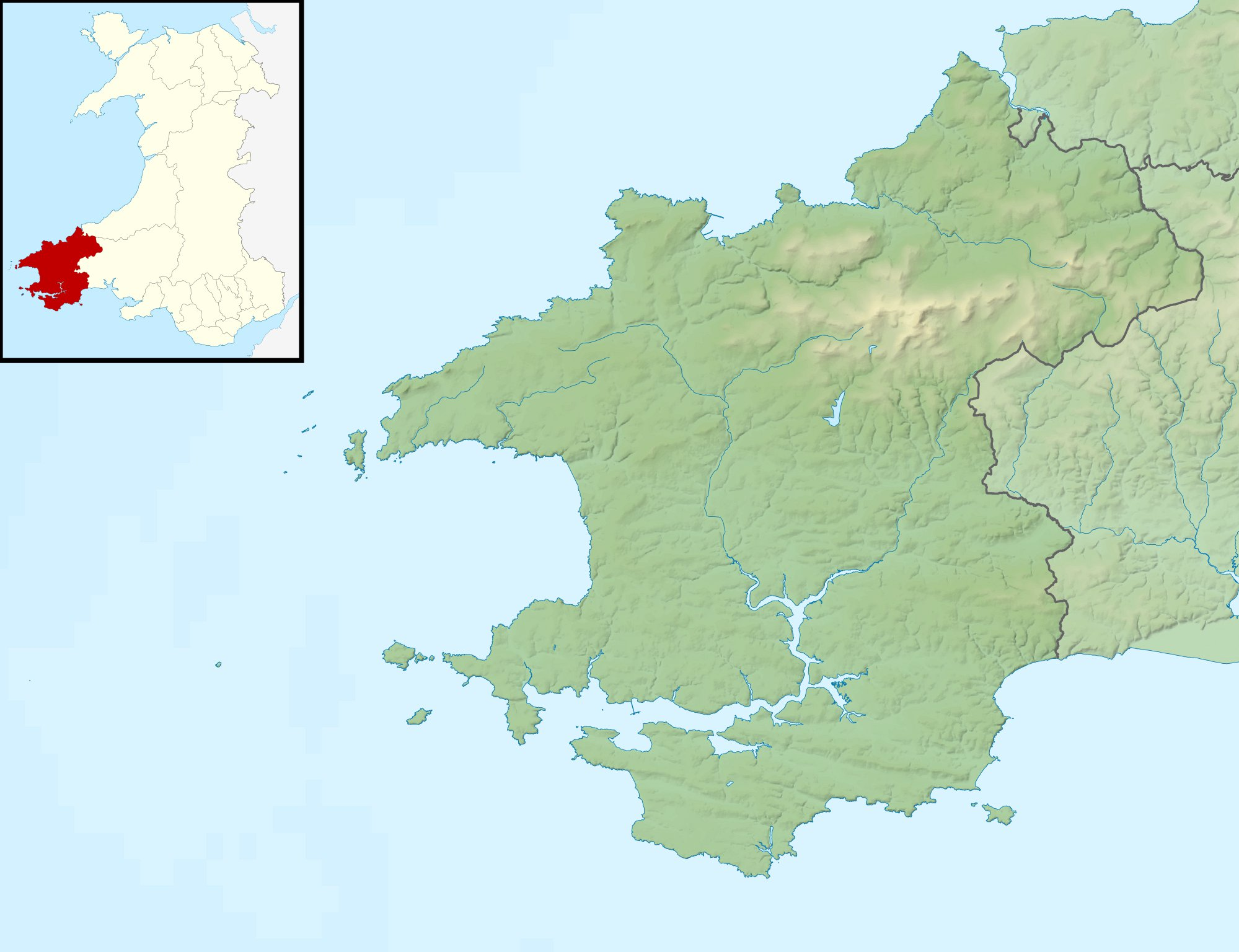
- Location in Pembrokeshire
- 51.82641°N 4.87177°W
- Type: Motte-and-bailey castle
- Location: Wiston, Pembrokeshire, Wales
- Nearest city: St Davids

Scheduled monument
- Official name: Wiston Castle
- Reference no.: PE077

Listed Building – Grade I
- Official name: Wiston Castle
- Designated: 16 June 2004; 22 years ago
- Reference no.: 82851

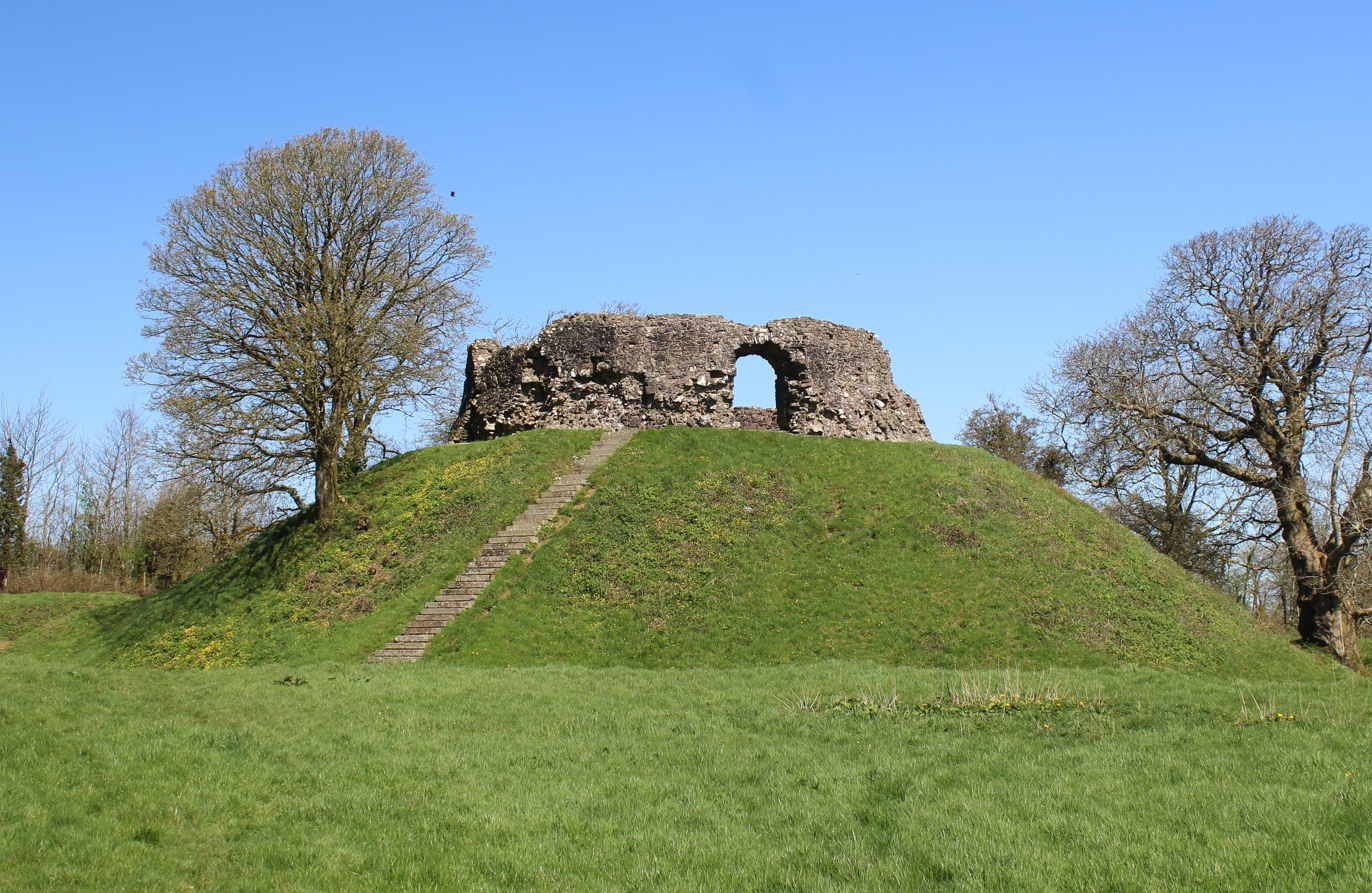
Wiston Castle, Pembrokeshire, May, 2018

Wiston Castle (Welsh: Castell Cas-wis) is a motte and bailey castle in the Pembrokeshire village of Wiston in south west Wales and is one of the best examples of its type in Wales. The castle and village were founded by Wizo, a Flemish settler who was granted the land by Henry I of England after he had wrested control from the previous owner, Arnulf de Montgomery (who was in revolt against Henry). The castle was captured by the Welsh on several occasions but on each occasion it was retaken. It was abandoned during the thirteenth century when the then owner moved to nearby Picton Castle.

The castle is situated opposite St Mary Magdalene Church and there are approximately 50 steps leading up to it. It is in the care of Cadw and is a Grade I listed building and a Scheduled Monument.

== History ==
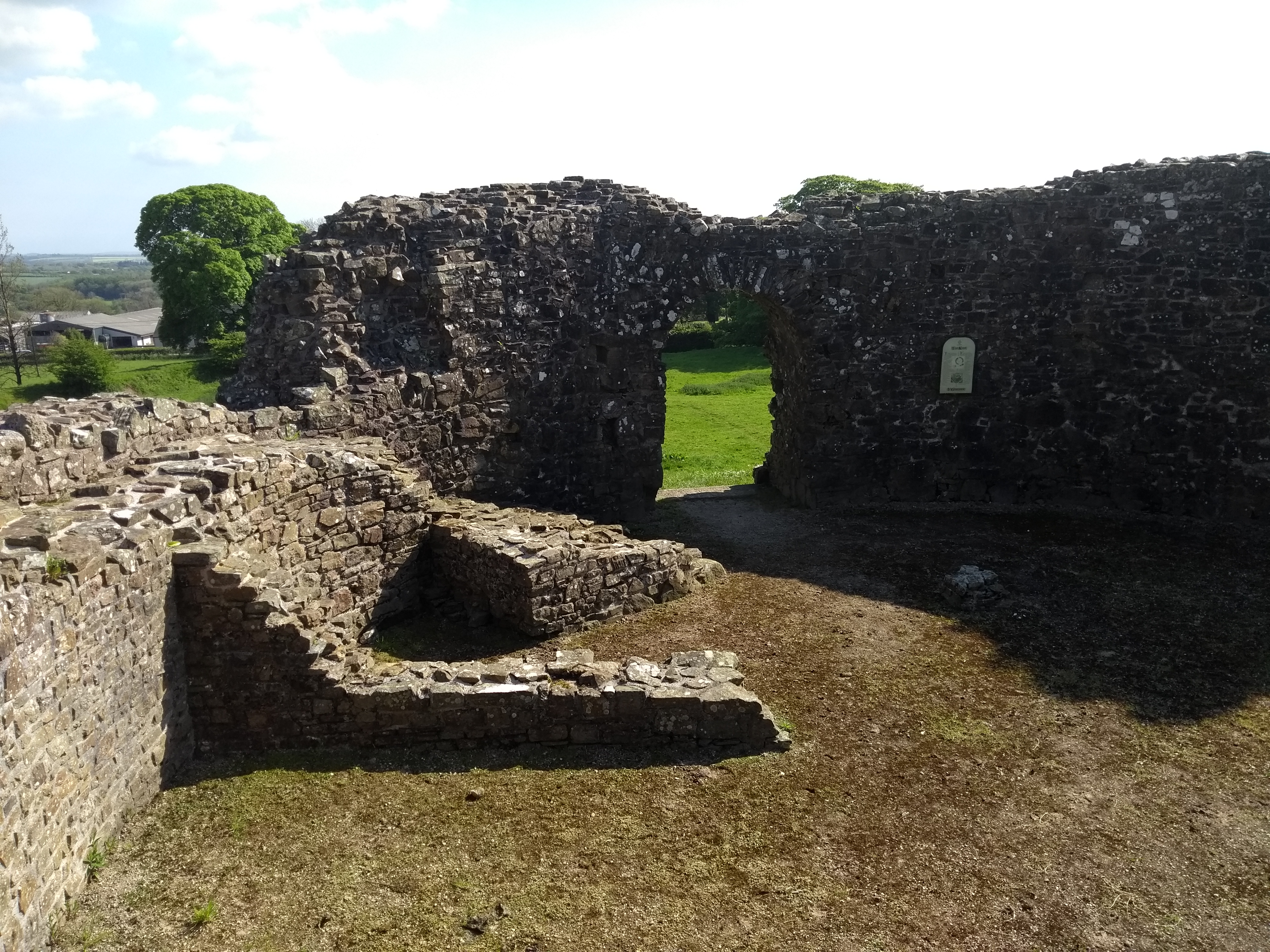
Interior of Wiston Castle, Pembrokeshire

=== Background ===
Until the late eleventh century, this part of southwestern Wales was part of the Welsh state of Deheubarth. The exact administrative structure of Dehubarth is unclear, but it may have been something of an amalgamation of sub-kingdoms, there being a Lord of Dyfed (named Cadifor) in this period, from the earlier line of rulers of Dyfed. Under King William I, Rhys ap Tewdwr, the ruling king of Deheubarth, accepted William's suzerainty, and enjoyed support as a loyal vassal.

In 1088, however, when William died, Rhys, believing his vassalage to be for William's life only, attacked Worcester (in alliance with other powerful rebel vassals); in theory, treason made his lands forfeit. In 1092, Deheubarth was internally destabilised when Cadifor died, and his sons refused to accept the authority of Rhys ap Tewdwr, instead calling for a rival to assume the throne. Though Rhys managed to suppress the rebellion, he was killed in the following year, in the Battle of Brecon, while attacking Bernard de Neufmarche (the husband of Nest, granddaughter of the previous - and only - Welsh King of Wales).

Following Rhys' death, the king's agents immediately seized much of Deheubarth; the west of Dyfed was seized by Arnulf de Montgomery, while the north and eastern parts were seized by Normans sailing from Devon - Martin de Turribus and William fitz Baldwin (sheriff of Devon, and son of the previous such sheriff, Baldwin FitzGilbert) respectively. At the same time Normans also took much of the rest of South Wales (although according to an old Welsh legend, reported by the Tudor antiquarian John Leland, this conquest east of Deheubarth was at the request of Cadifor's surviving brother/son, Einion). South western Dyfed, including the land in which Wiston was later sited, became a Marcher Lordship under Arnulf's rule; Arnulf built a castle at Pembroke from which to rule the land (the Lordship becoming of Pembroke as a result).

In 1102, following the death of King William's successor William Rufus, the Kingship passed to his brother, Henry I, but again many powerful vassals - including Arnulf de Montgomery - rebelled in favour of Henry's elder brother (Robert Curthose). Henry declared Arnulf's lands forfeit, and kept Arnulf's former Marcher Lordship for himself. Six years later, in 1108, Flanders, the lands of Henry's mother, suffered catastrophic flooding, and many refugees sought help from Henry. Henry settled them in his newly acquired lordship, particularly Roose (aka Haverford) and Dungleddy. The Flemings maintained their culture and were an identifiable group for at least a century; indeed the distinction between the Fleming-populated areas and the rest of Wales still leaves a strong mark in the local DNA.

=== Existence ===
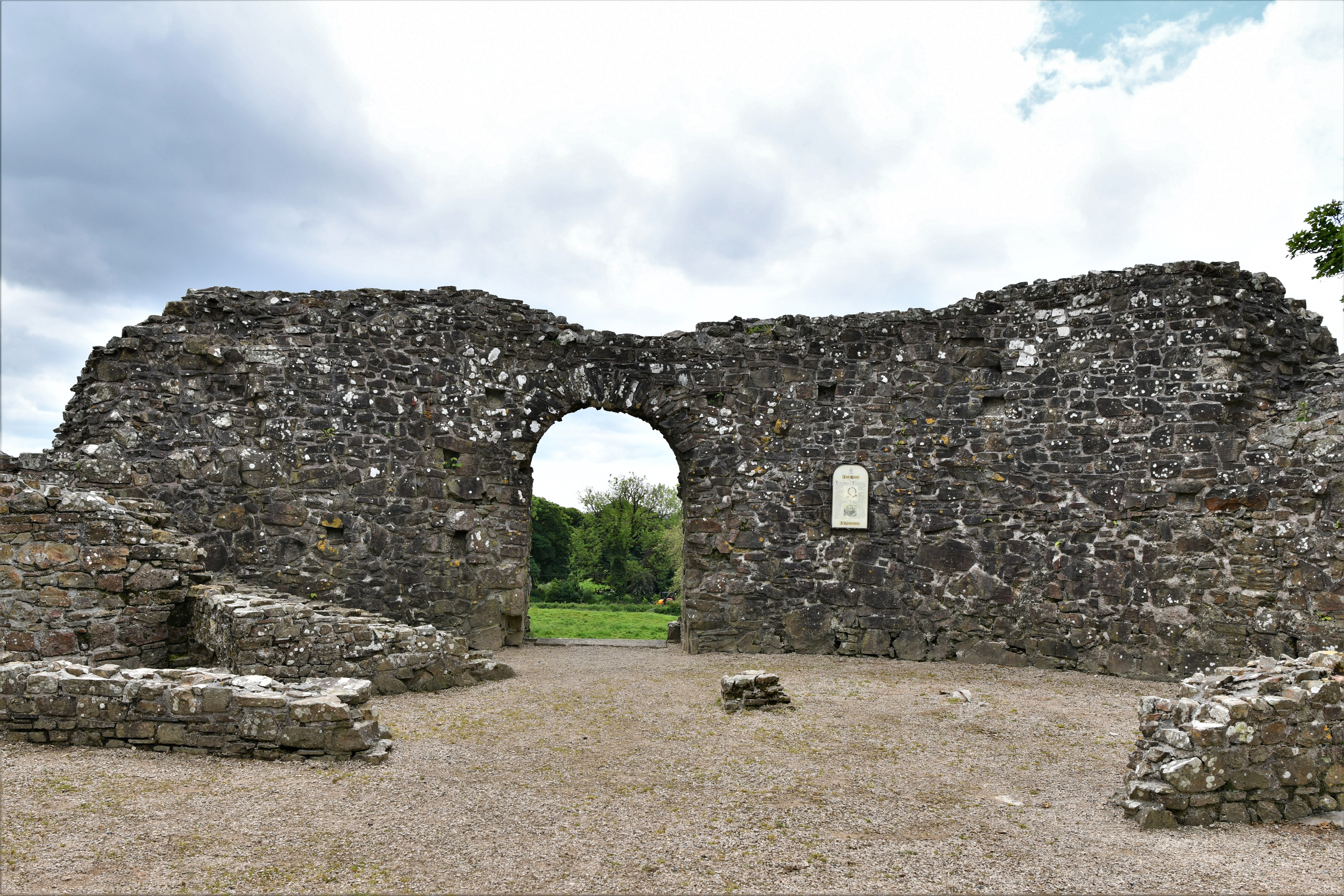
Inside the Wiston Castle

The Flemish leader in Dungleddy, a man named Wizo, built a castle to control his lands; it was effective in controlling Dungleddy. Around the castle a settlement arose, named after Wizo - Wiston (Old Flemish/Saxon for Wizo's enclosure/town) - hence the castle came to be called Wiston Castle. Wizo parcelled out some of his lands to lesser Flemings, one of whom, in 1130, was Wizo's son, Walter fitz-Wizo. Wizo was later to carry out a similar colonisation in Lanarkshire in Scotland.

In 1147, the Welsh led by Hywel ab Owain captured Wiston, now under control of Walter, but the Flemings soon got it back. Towards the end of the century, Dungleddy (and the Lordship of Pembroke in general) came under pressure from the sons of Lord Rhys, who were trying to aid their father to re-establish Deheubarth. In 1193, Hywel the Saxon (son of Lord Rhys) attacked the Flemings, captured Wiston Castle, and took Wizo's other son, Philip, captive (along with Philip's wife and sons). Philip had only just recently donated lands in Dungelly to the Knights Hospitaller. It took two years before the Flemings were able to recover Wiston Castle (and hence governance of Dungelly).

The castle was sacked by Llywelyn Fawr, in 1220, but a restoration was ordered by William Marshall the younger, the Marcher Earl of Pembroke (the Marcher Lordship of Pembroke had been transferred from the crown to William's great-grandfather, by King Stephen, in need of allies during The Anarchy following Henry I's death). Although exactly what happened after 1220 is unclear, the castle was abandoned while in an intermediary building stage; the original towers had been built of wood and the new, unfinished structures were built of stone, and show the original features without embellishments. The shell keep on the summit of the Motte is typical of the Norman stonework of the time.

=== Abandonment ===
The castle then came into the possession of Sir John Wogan (a man whose ancestry is now totally unknown), by completely unclear means. The castle was abandoned after Sir John moved to the nearby Picton Castle at the end of the 13th century.

During the English Civil War some four centuries later in 1643, the Royalists established a small outpost at Wiston, perhaps in the abandoned motte. Even this was then abandoned, without an engagement taking place, when (during the following year) parliamentary troops advanced into the area, led by Major-General Rowland Laugharne. However, soon afterwards there was a pitched battle and the Royalists were defeated at the Battle of Colby Moor, just south of Wiston.

== The site ==
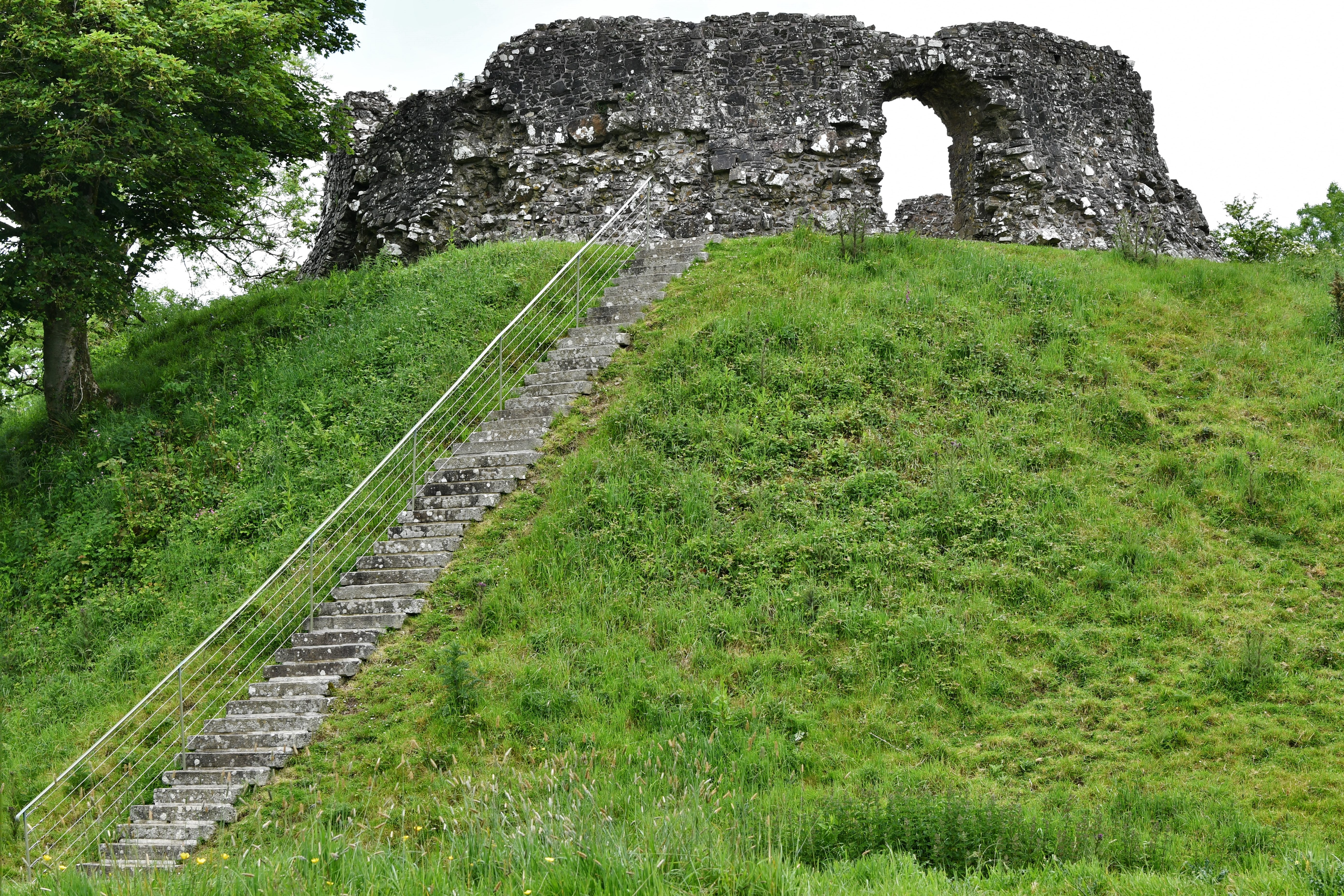
Approximately 50 steps leading to the rubble stone circular shell keep.

Wiston Castle is considered one of the best preserved motte-and-bailey castles in Wales. It is built on the summit of a hill to the north of Wiston with the motte about 9 m (30 ft) above the base of the ditch. Surrounding the flat top there is a shell-keep that would have been the main fortification inside which all the buildings, mostly made of timber, would have been placed. The external face of the shell-keep is polygonal, with eighteen short sections, but some of these have subsided into the ditch on the north side. The inside of the shell-keep is circular. There is an arched entrance on the south side and on either side of this there are draw-bar holes which would have been used to secure the main gate. Inside is a large, oval bailey protected by a well-preserved bank. The lord's main residence would have been inside the bailey.

The castle is a Grade I listed building and a Scheduled Monument. It is maintained by Cadw and is open throughout the year free of charge. There is a small car park nearby but no visitor facilities.

== See also ==
- List of Cadw properties
