= Lamphey Bishop's Palace =

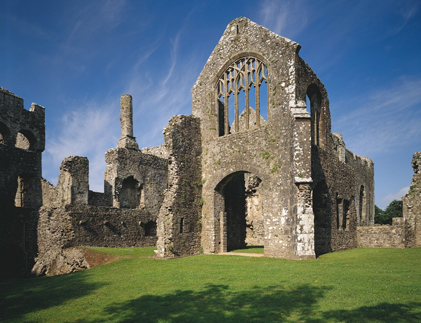
- Part of the ruins in 2006
- Interactive map of the Lamphey Bishop's Palace area

General information
- Status: ruined
- Type: medieval palace
- Location: Lamphey, SA71 5NT, Lamphey, Pembrokeshire, Wales
- Coordinates: 51.67176°N 4.86704°W
- Elevation: approx. 12m
- Owner: Cadw

Website
- http://cadw.gov.wales/daysout/lampheybishopspalace/?lang=en

Lamphey Bishop's Palace or Lamphey Palace (alternatively Lamphey Court) is a ruined medieval building complex in Lamphey, Pembrokeshire. It is a scheduled ancient monument and a Grade I Listed building. The grounds of the palace are designated, jointly with the park of Lamphey Court, as Grade II* on the Cadw/ICOMOS Register of Parks and Gardens of Special Historic Interest in Wales.

== History ==
Whilst early thirteenth-century fragments from the old hall still exist, the palace, including the 25-metre-long (82 ft; 27 yd) great hall, was largely constructed under Bishop Henry de Gower, Bishop of St David's (1328–1347) and was used by high-ranking clergy. The palace was built in three stages and originally had over 20 rooms and featured fishponds, orchards, fruit and herb gardens and areas of parkland with grazing deer.

The palace was surrendered to the crown in 1546 during the reign of Henry VIII and granted to Richard Devereux and subsequently the Earls of Essex. Walter Devereux, 1st Earl of Essex lived in the palace as a child. The palace was sold to the Owens of Orielton in 1683, possibly due to damage in the English Civil War. The buildings were possibly used for farm purposes in this era.

The palace ruins are listed as a scheduled ancient monument and a Grade I Listed building. The grounds of the palace are designated, jointly with the park of Lamphey Court, as Grade II* on the Cadw/ICOMOS Register of Parks and Gardens of Special Historic Interest in Wales.

== Gallery ==
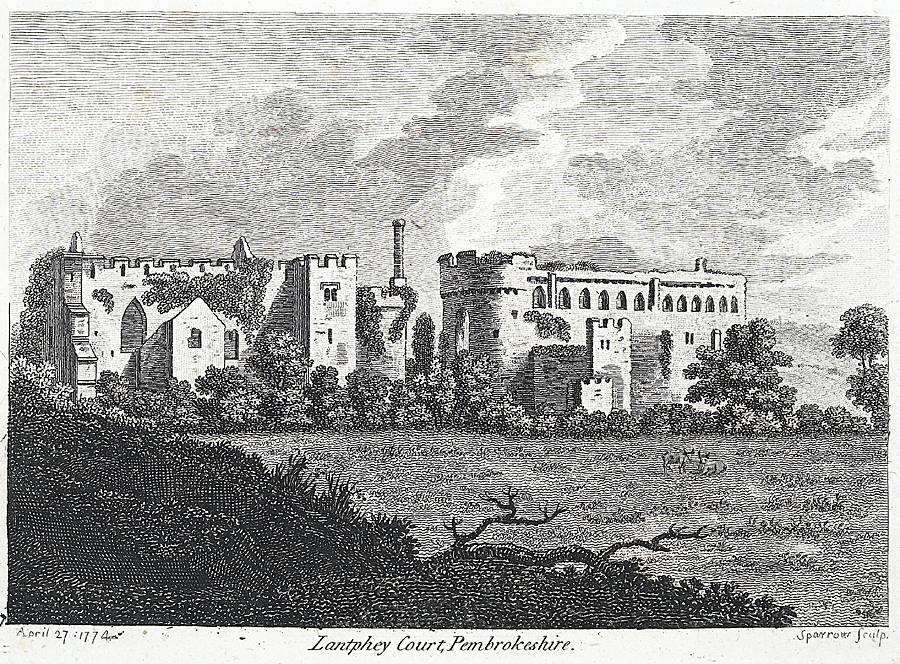
Engraving from 1774

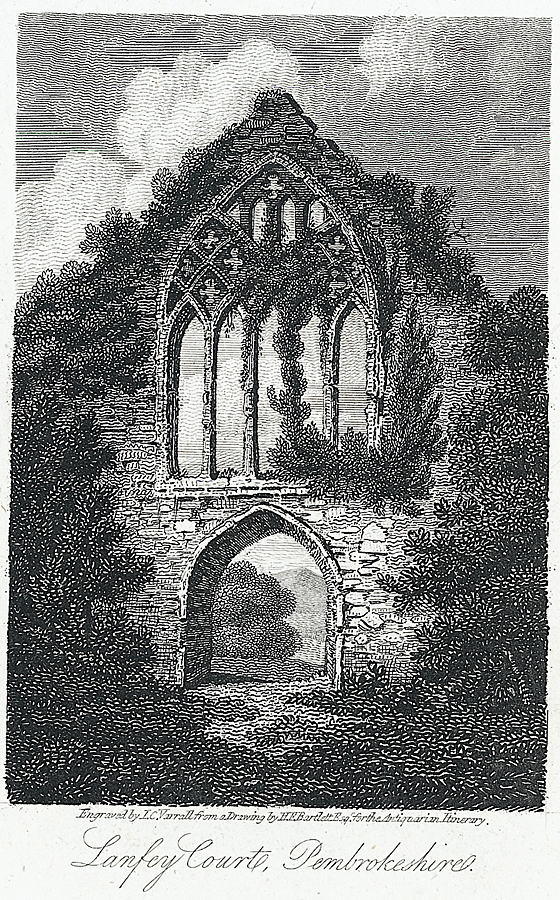
Engraving from 1815

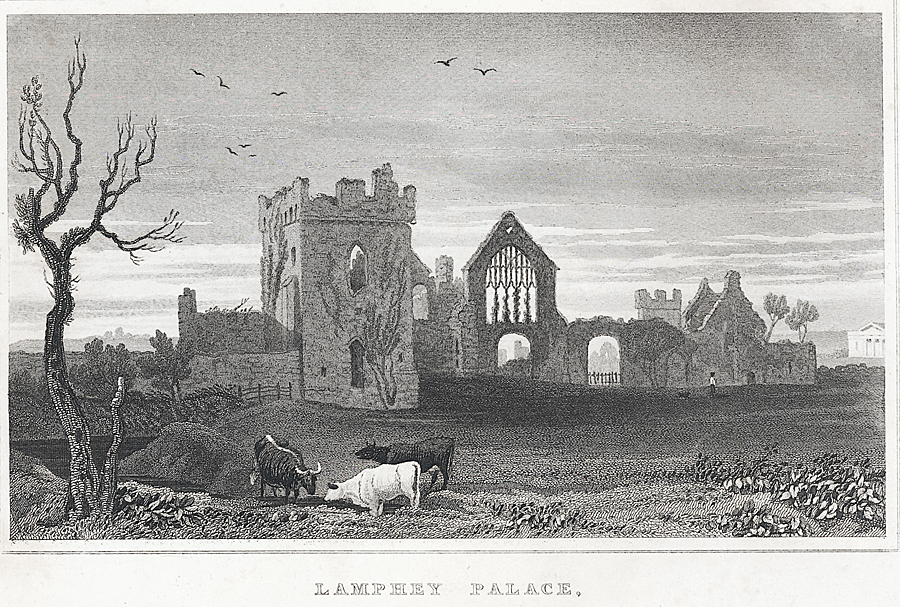
Engraving from circa 1830

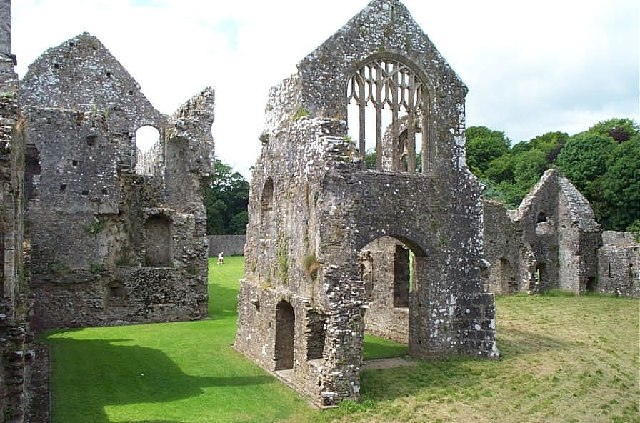

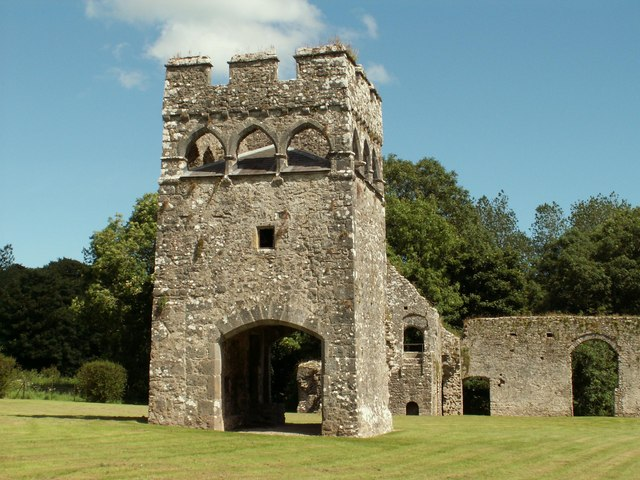

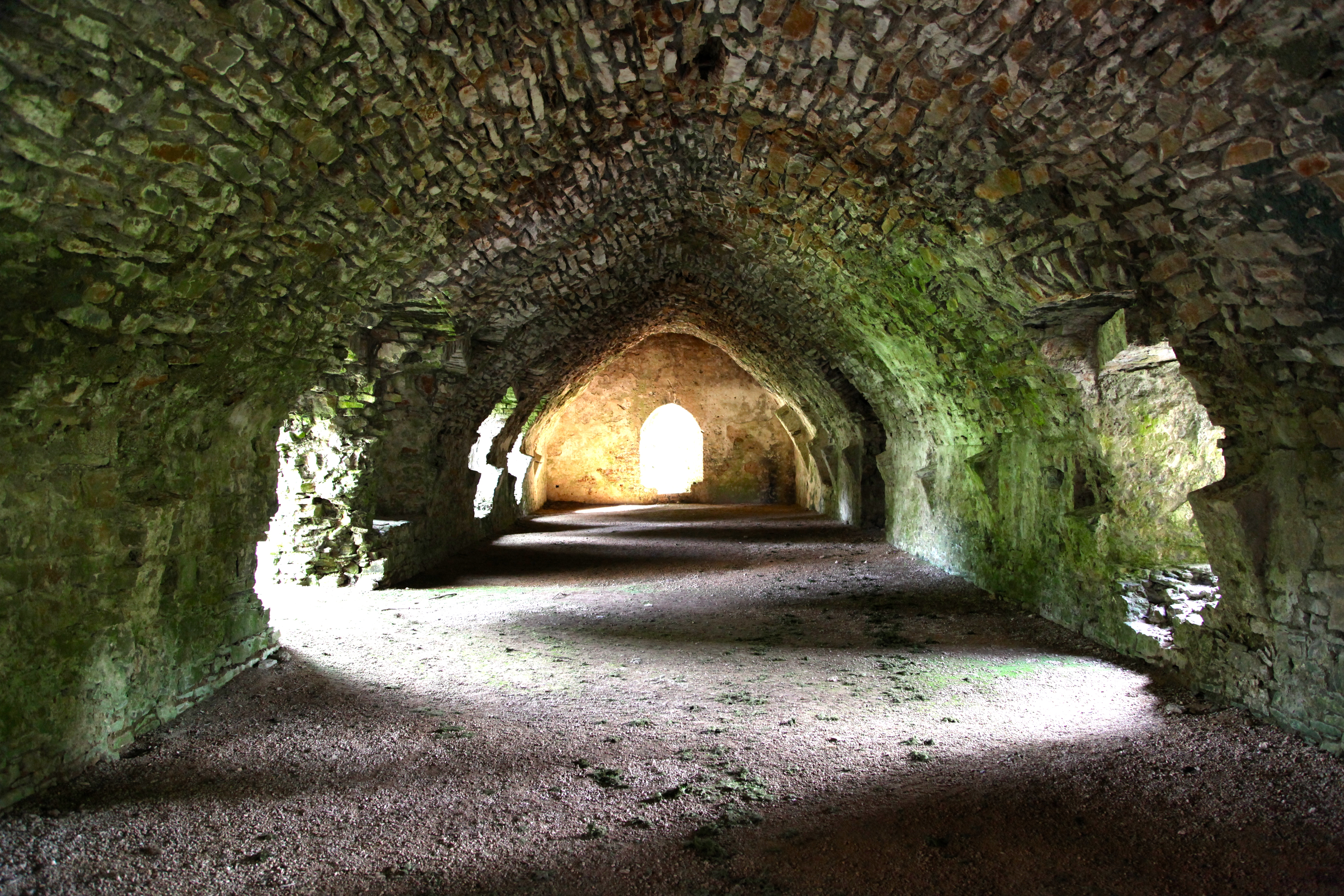
The undercroft

== See also ==
- St Davids Bishops Palace
