= Lamphey =

Village, parish and community in Pembrokeshire, Wales

Lamphey: Welsh: Llandyfái
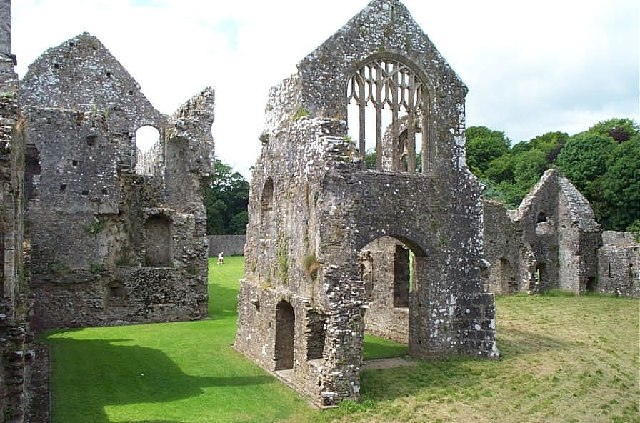
- Part of the Bishop's Palace

- Location within Pembrokeshire
- Population: 843 (2011)
- OS grid reference: SN018004
- Principal area: Pembrokeshire
- Country: Wales
- Sovereign state: United Kingdom
- Post town: Pembroke
- Postcode district: SA71 5
- Dialling code: 01646
- Police: Dyfed-Powys
- Fire: Mid and West Wales
- Ambulance: Welsh
- UK Parliament: Mid and South Pembrokeshire
- Senedd Cymru – Welsh Parliament: Ceredigion Penfro
- List of places UK Wales Pembrokeshire 51.67°N 4.87°W Map of the community

Lamphey (Welsh: Llandyfái pronounced [ɬandəˈvaɪ]) is a village, a parish and a community near the south coast of Pembrokeshire, Wales, approximately 2 miles (3.2 km) east of the town of Pembroke, and 2 miles (3.2 km) north of the seaside village of Freshwater East. The 2011 census reported a population of 843.

Freshwater East is in the community as is the village of Hodgeston.

The village includes the ruins of the fourteenth-century Lamphey Bishop's Palace; a palace of the Bishop of St David's.

== Church of St Tyfai and St Faith ==
The parish church, dedicated to St Tyfai (or Tyfie) and St Faith, is medieval in origin but was largely rebuilt in 1869–1871 by the architect Ewan Christian. The fine tower is thirteenth or fourteenth century. In the chancel a piscina and two lancet windows date from the thirteenth century, but have been repositioned. The font is Norman.

== Notable landmarks ==
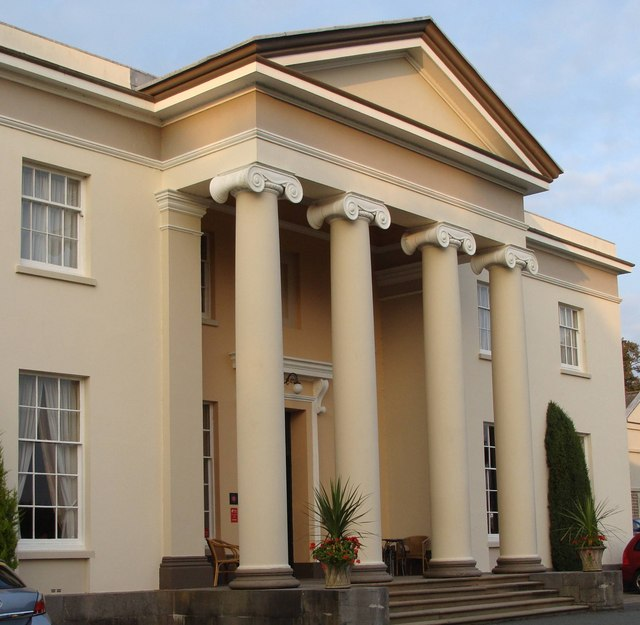
Lamphey Court

Several Georgian-era buildings remain, including the guesthouse, Lower Lamphey Park on the Ridgeway. The village has two hotels/restaurants, The Dial public house, a primary school, a service station with a shop, a hairdressers, and a local bakery which has served the community for generations. There are playing fields. The village hall, with a capacity of 120 people, was completed in 2007.

Bishop Vaughan was responsible for adding the first-floor chapel on the north side of Lamphey Hall in the early 16th century. In 1542, Lamphey Manor was "surrendered to Henry VIII in exchange for the rich rectory of Carew".

The grade II listed Lamphey Court, a Georgian mansion, was built in 1823 to the west of the ruins of the Bishop's Palace. It was the seat of the Mathias family until it was sold in 1978 by Wing Commander Lewis Mathias, the High Sheriff of Pembrokeshire.

== Governance ==
Lamphey, together with Cosheston, forms an electoral ward. The total ward population taken at the 2011 Census was 1,671.

== Railway ==
Lamphey railway station on the Pembroke Dock branch of the West Wales Line is operated by Transport for Wales Rail, who also manage the station. Trains stop here on request every two hours in each direction, westwards to Pembroke Dock and eastwards to Tenby, Whitland, Carmarthen and Swansea.

== River ==
The Pembroke River rises at nearby Hodgeston Hill to flow through Lamphey to Pembroke Castle.

== See also ==
- Lamphey Bishop's Palace
- Lamphey Cricket Club Ground
