= Uzmaston, Boulston and Slebech =

Place in Wales

Coordinates: 51.8033°N 4.8650°W

- Location within Pembrokeshire
- Population: 712 (2011 census)
- Community: Uzmaston, Boulston and Slebech
- Principal area: Pembrokeshire
- Country: Wales
- Sovereign state: United Kingdom
- List of places UK Wales Pembrokeshire Map of the community

Uzmaston, Boulston and Slebech is a community in Pembrokeshire, Wales, which includes the villages of Uzmaston, Boulston and Slebech, and the Haverfordwest suburb of Cartlett (an area in the western part of Haverfordwest, no longer marked on modern maps).

== Formation ==
The community was formed in 2012 by the amalgamation of the community of Uzmaston and Boulston and the community of Slebech. It is divided into two electoral wards: Uzmaston & Boulston Ward and Slebech Ward.

== Operation ==
There are six councillors for Uzmaston and Boulston Ward and two for Slebech Ward. Community Council meetings, which are open to the public, are held at either Uzmaston Village Hall or The Rhos Village Hall.

== Population ==
The population at formation according to the 2011 census was 712.

== Listed buildings ==
There are 31 listed buildings in the community, including one Grade I (Picton Castle) and three Grade II*.

== History ==
The three principal villages of which the community is made up are all medieval or older. They appear as separate parishes (Osmaston, Boulston and Sleback) on a 1578 parish map of Pembrokeshire. While Haverfordwest (Herfordwest) is on the map, the suburb of Cartlett is not marked.
