= Cresselly House =

Georgian country house in Cresselly, Pembrokeshire, Wales

Coordinates: 51.7237°N 4.8026°W

Cresselly House is a Georgian country house in the village of Cresselly, Pembrokeshire that operates as a country house hotel. It is a Grade II* listed building while its gardens and park are designated at Grade II on the Cadw/ICOMOS Register of Parks and Gardens of Special Historic Interest in Wales.

== History ==
Cresselly had belonged to the Bartlett family since 1564. It came into the Allen family in 1728 when John Allen (d. 1752), of Goodhooke, married Joan, the daughter and heiress of John Bartlett of Cresselly. John Allen was appointed High Sheriff of Pembrokeshire in 1732. The estate lay on reserves of coal, which were mined to provide an income and exported from Cresswell Quay. The present house was built in 1769 by John Allen's son, Captain John Bartlett Allen, an army officer in the First Foot Guards, to replace an earlier building which was undesirably close to the coal mines.

The estate descended in the male line down to Henry Seymour Allen (1847-1928) who died unmarried, when it passed to his nephew, Hugh Evelyn Allen (1880-1933). Hugh Evelyn's heir was his only daughter, Auriol Joan Bartlett Harrison-Allen. Her son, Hugh Harrison-Allen has been the present owner since 1992 following Auriol's death

== Architecture and description ==
The main range is rubble built in three storeys with two storey blocks on either side. It faces west looking down a valley towards the Cleddau Estuary.
