= Slebech =

Settlement in Pembrokeshire, Wales

Coordinates: 51.80333°N 4.865°W

- Location within Pembrokeshire
- Population: 124
- OS grid reference: SN0214
- Community: Uzmaston, Boulston and Slebech
- Principal area: Pembrokeshire
- Country: Wales
- Sovereign state: United Kingdom
- Post town: Haverfordwest
- Postcode district: SA62
- Police: Dyfed-Powys
- Fire: Mid and West Wales
- Ambulance: Welsh
- UK Parliament: Mid and South Pembrokeshire
- Senedd Cymru – Welsh Parliament: Carmarthen West and South Pembrokeshire

Slebech (Welsh: Slebets) was a community (prior to 1974, a civil parish) in Pembrokeshire, Wales, which is now part of the combined community of Uzmaston and Boulston and Slebech, a sparsely populated community on the northern shore of the Eastern River Cleddau. The community shares boundaries with the communities of Wiston and Llawhaden and mainly consists of farmland and woodland. Much of the community is within the Pembrokeshire Coast National Park and Picton Castle's stable block loft is an important breeding roost for the rare Greater Horseshoe Bat.

== History ==
Slebech is situated on the upper Eastern Cleddau and was once part of the Barony of Daugleddau. In the Middle Ages Slebech belonged to the Knights Hospitallers of the Order of St John and the original church on the bank of the river was established in 1161, together with a commandery which became the headquarters of the order in West Wales. After the Dissolution of the Monasteries by Henry VIII the lands passed to the Barlow family.

Roger Barlow (c. 1483–1553) was born in Essex, in or near Colchester, where his father was a customs official. After becoming a merchant in Seville, Barlow joined Sebastian Cabot's 1526 voyage to South America, accompanying Cabot up the River Plate. He returned to England in 1530 and lived in Bristol, where he married Julyan Dawes. He moved to Pembrokeshire in 1535. In 1542 he presented a cosmography to Henry VIII, based on a translation of Enciso's Spanish Suma de Geographia. This included Barlow's descriptions of his travels – the first account of the New World in English. Roger Barlow had three younger brothers, William Barlow (successively bishop of St David's, Bath and Wells, and Chichester), John Barlow (dean of Worcester), and Thomas Barlow (a cleric in Norfolk). After renting the dissolved commandery of the hospitallers of St John of Jerusalem at Slebech, Roger and Thomas Barlow bought Slebech in 1546, and then Roger became the sole owner in 1553. Barlow had at least 10 children, including John who inherited Slebech.

=== Picton Castle ===
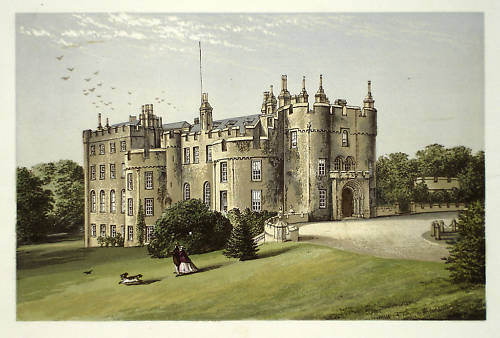
Picton Castle

The estates, gardens and parkland of Picton Castle was once part of the larger Manor of Wiston, but had become a separate holding, replacing Wiston Castle by the 13th century. Picton Castle began as a motte castle and was reconstructed in stone by the Wogan family during the 13th century. In 1405 French troops supporting Owain Glyndŵr attacked and held the Castle, and it was seized again during the English Civil War in 1645 by Parliamentary forces.

The Picton Castle estate was acquired by the Phillips family when Sir Thomas ap Philip of Cilsant married Jane, daughter and heiress of Sir Henry Dwnn, of Picton in the 1490s. Sir John Philipps, who inherited the castle in the 15th century, remodelled the building and created a new entrance which remained until the 1820s when a new entrance was designed by Thomas Rowlands (who also designed Slebech Church).

The estate remained with the Phillips family until the death of Lord Milford, in 1823, when it was inherited by his cousin (through female lines) Richard Grant, who assumed the surname Philipps and was created a Baronet in 1828 and Baron Milford in 1847. His heir was his half-brother, the Reverend James Henry Alexander Philipps (formerly Gwyther), who assumed by royal licence the surname and arms of Philipps. On his death the estate passed to his son-in-law, Charles Edward Gregg Philipps, who was created a Baronet in 1887 (see Philipps Baronets), then to Sir Richard Foley Foley-Philipps, cousin of Sir John Erasmus, and grandson of Charles Edward Gregg Philipps. Now run by the Picton Castle Trust, the present owner, Jeremy Philipps, lives in a lodge in the grounds.

=== Slebech Park Estate ===
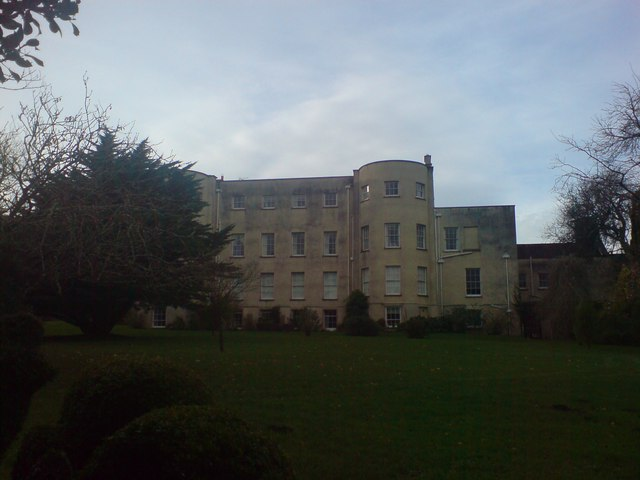
Slebech Hall

Slebech Park developed from estates belonging to the Knights Hospitaller and their Commandery at Slebech Church. After the dissolution the Barlow family built Slebech Mansion near the site of the Commandery, and established Slebech Park. The Hall is a grade II* listed building and its stable block is grade II listed.

After the death of George Barlow in 1757, having no son the land passed to his daughter Anne, who married William Trevanion of Cornwall and after his death, John Symmons of Llanstinan. Symmons sold the estate to William Knox of London, High Sheriff of Pembrokeshire for 1786, who in turn sold it to Nathaniel Phillips (High Sheriff for 1796).

Nathaniel Phillips was born in England in 1733, the illegitimate son of a merchant trading between London and Kingston, Jamaica. Following his father he arrived at Kingston in April 1759 and used his father's connections to join a partnership with the Kingston merchants who owned sugar plantations which supported the slave trade to obtain workers. Over twenty five years he built a fortune and his Jamaican properties were valued £160,000 Jamaica currency, as well as ownership of 706 slaves valued at £50,000. In 1793, he bought the estate at Slebech from a bankrupt slaver. As well as Slebech Hall, which he had re-modelled by Anthony Keck, Phillips bought 600 acres (2.4 km^{2}) of park land and woodland. In 1796 he married Mary, a Philipps forty years younger than him and had two sons (Nathaniel and Edward Augustus) and two daughters (Mary Dorothea and Louisa Catharine). After his death, Phillips' heirs continued to operate the Jamaican estates but they became unprofitable after the end of slavery in 1834.

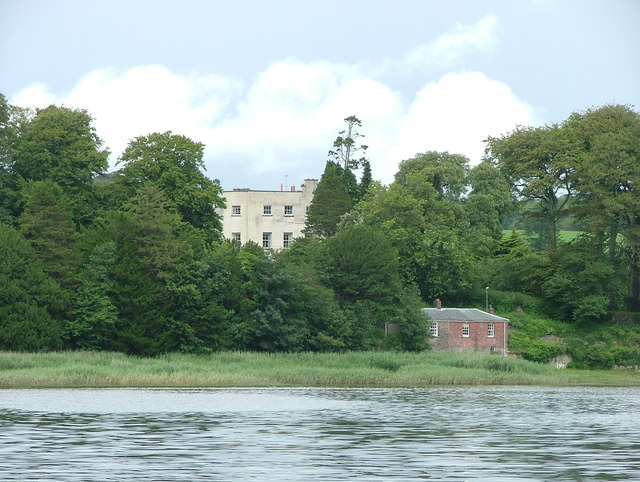
Slebech Hall and Eastern Cleddau

After the death of Edward, the estate passed to Mary Dorothea and her sister, Louisa Catherine, the Countess of Lichfield, as co-heiress. In 1821 Mary Dorothea met Charles Frederick Baron de Rutzen of Germany in Rome. A Polish nobleman and descendant of Field Marshal Potemkin, they married in 1822 and became Lords of the Manors of Slebech. Their eldest son, Baron Frederick Leopold Sapieha Manteuffel (High Sheriff of Pembrokeshire for 1871), died and the estate passed to his younger brother, Baron Rudolph William Henry Ehrard (High Sheriff for 1895), who was succeeded by his nephew, Alan Frederick James. Their third son, Albert Richard Francis Maximilien married Horatia Augusta Stepney Gulston, of Carmarthenshire and their eldest son, Alan Frederick James married Eleanor Etna Audley Thursby Pelham, in 1908. Lieutenant-Colonel Augustus Henry Archibald Anson VC MP, (5 March 1835 – 17 November 1877), recipient of the Victoria Cross during the Crimean War, was born at Slebech Hall. John Frederick Foley de Rutzen married Sheila Victoria Katrin Philipps, of Picton Castle, and their only child, Victoria Anne Elizabeth Gwynne de Rutzen, married Sir Francis Dashwood of West Wycombe Park.

Their descendants managed both estates and in 2003 Geoffrey and Georgina Philipps developed the large stable block into a luxury hotel. It was the first project in Pembrokeshire to attract European Objective One funding and was also funded by the Welsh Development Agency (WDA) and the Wales Tourist Board. The Phillips family left the estate in 2014, which continues to operate as a hotel. Slebach Hall, however, is largely abandoned.

== Geology ==
On the northern bank of the Eastern Cleddau, the foreshore is of mud, marsh and rocks. Slebech has extensive deciduous woodland and open farmland. Fields are large and regular and are divided by earth banks topped with hedges. Agriculture land use is improved pasture with a small proportion of arable crops.

== The Rhos village ==
The only settlement of any size is the small hamlet of The Rhos with a population of 25 people. Community services and facilities are limited, with a small church hall. The Rhos village is located along one street which once included a primary school and post office. The old school building is now a private residence. Originally known as 'Slebech and Picton Castle School', it later became Slebech Voluntary Controlled School and operated from 1866 with support from the Philipps family of Picton Castle. It was taken over by the Education Authority in the 1930s and closed in 1985, with only 11 pupils on the register.

== Listing designations ==
Grade II listed Slebech Park is one of a total of 25 listed buildings in Slebech with the main ones as follows:

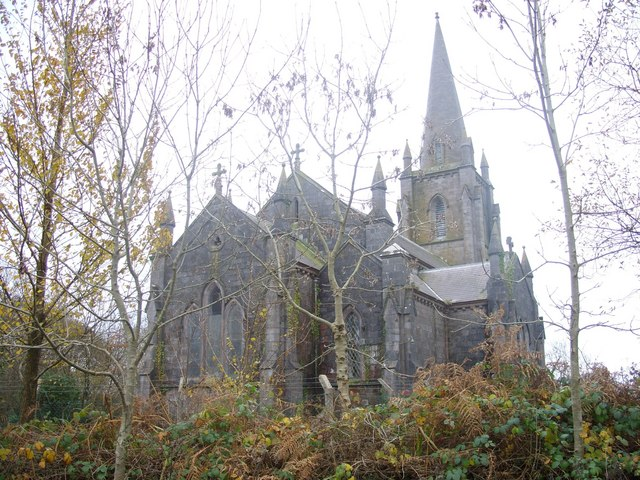
St Johns Church Slebech

The Church of St John the Baptist is a Grade II listed building which was consecrated in 1848 as Slebech Parish Church in place of the older Parish Church. It was designed by Thomas Rowlands of Haverfordwest and paid for by Baron de Rutzen with contributions from Queen Adelaide. The church was deconsecrated in 1990 due to subsidence.

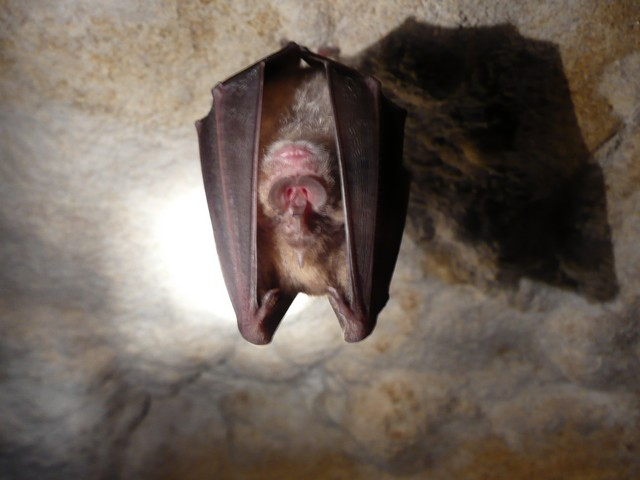
Greater Horseshoe Bat

The Stable Block at Slebech Park is Grade II listed. A rectangular block 40m by 60m built of local rubble stone masonry with quoins of limestone. An unusual feature is that crenellated parapets hide slate roofs. The stables have an octagonal clock-tower with a weathervane. The stable block loft is also an important breeding roost for the rare Greater Horseshoe Bat (Rhinolophus ferrumequinum) and numbers have been recorded at Slebech since 1983.

Blackpool Bridge is Grade II listed and located to the east of Blackpool Mill to cross the River Cleddau. A single-span bridge, it was built about 1825 for the de Rutzens family of coursed, undressed stone, with two carved external panels on either side and dressed stone edge on the rim of the arch. To the south of the bridge are stone piers topped by ball finials.

The park is designated Grade II* on the Cadw/ICOMOS Register of Parks and Gardens of Special Historic Interest in Wales.

== Scheduled Ancient Monuments ==
Remains of the old church of St John the Baptist (PEM 275). Located between the mansion of Slebech and the river, this is a ruin with only the main walls surviving. Records show that in 1766 the ceiling fell down and workmen were paid for the job of `stripping the church.' The owner, Baron de Rutzen, built a replacement church and stripped the rest of the roof in 1844, partly to stop worshipers coming on to his land. Burial mounds on the island to the east of the church (PEM 276) are also scheduled ancient monuments, one is known locally as Dog Island because it is where Slebech Park owners have buried their pets over the past hundred years.
