= William Wogan (Custos Rotulorum) =

Custos Rotulorum of Pembrokeshire

Sir William Wogan was Custos Rotulorum of Pembrokeshire from 1621 to 1625.
