= Boulston =

Village in Pembrokeshire, Wales

Coordinates: 51.77°N 04.94°W

- Location within Pembrokeshire
- OS grid reference: SM9712
- Principal area: Pembrokeshire
- Country: Wales
- Sovereign state: United Kingdom
- Police: Dyfed-Powys
- Fire: Mid and West Wales
- Ambulance: Welsh

Boulston is a small settlement and former parish on the left bank of the Western Cleddau river in Pembrokeshire, Wales, in the community of Uzmaston, Boulston and Slebech.

== History ==
=== Boulston Manor ===
The parish was in the ancient hundred of Dungleddy. It was marked on a 1578 parish map of Pembrokeshire. Boulston Manor was occupied from the 15th to 18th centuries by the Wogan family. When the estate was sold in 1797 the new owner, Major Dudley Acland, abandoned the old site, and built Boulston Lodge (now re-named Boulston Manor) a short distance to the northwest, described by the Royal Commission. A detailed survey of the old manor was carried out in 2012, and the site was determined to be at risk from river erosion. An outline history of the estate was published by the Royal Commission in 2000. The "new" Boulston Manor is a Grade II listed building, and currently serves as a bed and breakfast and a wedding venue.

The title formerly associated with the property, the Lordship of the Manor of Boulston, was bought at auction in 2016 by the retired hotelier John Heaney for £5750.

=== Demographics ===
In the mid-1800s there were 319 inhabitants in the small, rural parish. In the 1870s, the parish was quoted as 1,822 acres (737 ha), of which 160 were water. The population was 254, in 54 houses, most occupied in agriculture.

=== Church ===
The parish church, dedicated to St Ismael and originally the private chapel to the Wogans, was abandoned in the 20th century. Church records are held either by the National Library of Wales, or Pembrokeshire Records Office.
