= The London Clinic =

Private healthcare organisation in London

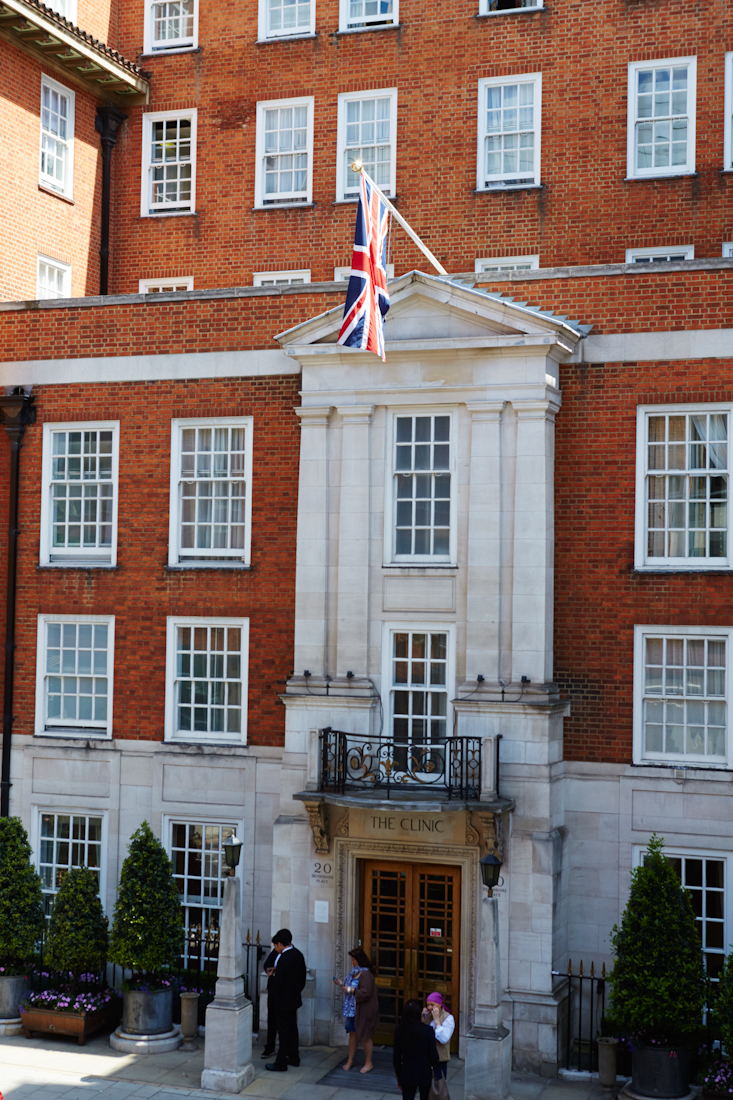
- The London Clinic

- Location in Westminster

Geography
- Location: London, W1; United Kingdom
- Coordinates: 51°31′22.7″N 0°9′1″W

Organisation
- Care system: Private

History
- Founded: 18 February 1932; 94 years ago

Links
- Website: www.thelondonclinic.co.uk

The London Clinic is a private healthcare organisation and registered charity located at the corner of Devonshire Place and Marylebone Road in central London. According to HealthInvestor, it is one of England's largest private hospitals.

== History ==
=== Early 20th century ===
The London Clinic was established by a group of Harley Street doctors; the building was designed by Charles Henry Biddulph-Pinchard and officially opened in 1932 by the Duchess of York, who was accompanied by the Duke.

=== Second World War ===
From October 1939 until July 1940 the London Clinic was closed to patients for necessary changes to meet wartime need. The walls were strengthened, upper storeys vacated and repurposed. Operating theatres were transferred from the 8th floor to the basement. Shelters were created in the basement where patients from the 3rd and 4th floors could sleep. The Second World War came close to home for the London Clinic with bombs falling in the Marylebone area and in Harley Street.

Wartime links were established between the Special Operations Executive (SOE) and The London Clinic. Eminent surgeons performed operations necessary to alter the appearance of agents who were to operate behind enemy lines in Nazi occupied Europe. High ranking military officers were also admitted and treated for various conditions. These included Archibald Sinclair, Secretary of State for Air, and General Dwight D. Eisenhower, Supreme Allied Commander Europe, who both worked from the Clinic when they were patients. The Clinic staff were vetted for security.

The London Clinic wartime Matron was Miss Jean Decima Jacomb who was born on 11 January 1894, the tenth child out of thirteen of an affluent family. During the First World War, Jean Jacomb trained as a Registered Nurse at St Bartholomew's Hospital. She also went on to qualify in midwifery, gaining experience in Whitechapel. She held senior posts at St. Bartholomew's and other hospitals. She become Supervisor of St. Bartholomew's District Midwives and then Matron of The Cancer Hospital (later to be renamed The Royal Marsden Hospital). She was appointed to the London Clinic in 1938.

It fell to Jean Jacomb to oversee the process of putting the London Clinic on a wartime footing. Due to absence of records it is not known the precise extent of Jean Jacomb's clinical achievements. However she received the highest tributes from the Executive and Trustees of The London Clinic on her retirement in 1949. The weight of responsibility on a Matron during the most exacting times received acknowledgment. She was credited with establishing the highest nursing standards always displaying calm authority and maintaining an unfailing presence.

Aged 90 she was admitted to a Kensington Nursing Home and died on 13 June 1988.

=== Late 20th century ===
The Prince of Wales opened the physiotherapy department in 1989, and Princess Margaret unveiled the MRI unit in the radiology department in 1991. Queen Elizabeth II opened a new cancer centre, built at a cost of £80 million, at the London Clinic in April 2010. In 2011, Princess Alexandra opened the new eye centre.

After an inspection in December 2014 by the Food Standards Agency the organisation was given only two stars, the only hospital in London to perform so poorly, but the poor standard of hygiene was addressed and, after a further inspection in June 2015, the Clinic was awarded five stars.

In November 2015 it secured a £65 million revolving credit facility from HSBC which was used to increase theatre capacity, boost technology investment and renovate the radiology and intensive care facilities. In November 2017 the Care Quality Commission described the design of the new intensive care unit and the annual multi-faith memorial service, which contributes to end of life services, as areas of "outstanding practice". The new intensive care unit was unveiled by the Duchess of Cornwall in 2017. The clinic opened a specialist centre for robotic surgery in 2019.

== Criticisms ==
In June 2021, following an unannounced inspection, the Care Quality Commission (CQC) used their enforcement powers to issue the clinic with a Warning Notice in respect of their failure to provide Good Governance. When the CQC reinspected later that year, they found that not all of their concerns had been addressed and their report specified their monitoring of the failure would continue until fixed. The CQC also found during their inspection, that the Surgical service required improvement and it was "inadequate in [the category of being] well-led".

In 2022, the Competition and Markets Authority (CMA) issued an Official Reprimand, for the clinic's lack of transparency over a period of six years, for not disclosing part-time Consultants' referral payments, going back to 2015. The CMA criticised the clinic's approach and said it broke Part 3, of the Private Healthcare Market Investigation Order 2014, with the clinic only summarising payments as "the fair market rate for their services".

In March 2024, the Information Commissioner's Office (ICO) confirmed that they were looking into a security breach at the clinic. Speculation that recent patient records had been accessed by an unauthorised member of staff were widespread in the media. At least two senior members of the royal family had been treated at the clinic in 2024. The clinic's website on the subject of personal data, makes clear and confirms we, "only permit access to those with a legitimate power or reason to access your [personal] information". The following day, the clinic issued a statement that if a data breach by staff was found, disciplinary action would follow. A former healthcare worker was cautioned by the ICO after attempting to sell the Princess of Wales’s medical records for financial gain.

== Notable patients ==
- Clement Attlee was admitted to the clinic for a prostatectomy in September 1939.
- John F. Kennedy was diagnosed with Addison's disease at the clinic in September 1947.
- Sir Anthony Eden went into the London Clinic for a cholecystectomy in April 1953.
- Adnan Menderes recovered in the London Clinic after being involved in an air crash in February 1959.
- Emma Walton Hamilton was born in the clinic in November 1962.
- Elizabeth Taylor underwent an operation on her knee at the clinic in January 1963.
- Prince Edward, Duke of Windsor, underwent surgery for a detached retina at the London Clinic in March 1965.
- David Cameron was born at the clinic on 9 October 1966.
- Abdul Razak Hussein, Malaysia's second prime minister died during treatment for leukemia in the clinic on 14 January 1976.
- Sir Charles Clore died of cancer in the clinic in July 1979.
- Princess Margaret, Countess of Snowdon, underwent an operation to remove a benign skin lesion in the clinic in January 1980.
- Augusto Pinochet, the former dictator of Chile, was arrested at the London Clinic in October 1998 for crimes against humanity on the basis of an international arrest warrant.
- Long John Baldry was admitted by Rod Stewart to the clinic in 1999 when he developed gout across his body.
- Jeremy Beadle died there on 30 January 2008 of pneumonia.
- Wendy Richard died on 26 February 2009, aged 65, at the clinic where she was being treated for breast cancer.
- Prince Philip, Duke of Edinburgh, was admitted to the clinic for "abdominal investigations" in June 2013.
- Cecil Parkinson died on 22 January 2016, aged 84, at the clinic where he was being treated for cancer of the colon.
- Catherine, Princess of Wales, underwent planned abdominal surgery on 16 January 2024.
- Charles III underwent treatment for an enlarged prostate on 26 January 2024.
- Khaleda Zia, former prime minister of Bangladesh was admitted to the clinic for treatment in January 2025.
- Muhammadu Buhari, former President of Nigeria died at The London Clinic on 13 July 2025.
- Abdulsalami Abubakar, former Head of State of Nigeria was admitted to the clinic in July 2025.

== See also ==
- List of hospitals in England
