= Audley Group =

British property builder and manager

Coordinates: 51°25′57.4″N 0°32′46.5″W

Audley Group (trading name of Audley Court Ltd) is a builder and manager in the British retirement property industry (retirement communities). The company's based in Egham and has two property brands in the UK - Audley Villages (with 20 luxury retirement villages) and formerly known as Audley Retirement, and Mayfield Villages (with two retirement communities).

In 2024 Audley Group has 22 retirement villages across England, restricted to people over the age of 55. The villages are currently selling properties with access to a health and wellbeing club, a bistro and/or a restaurant and a care team within every Audley village.

Audley retirement villages are often built around listed buildings and the homeowners pay a monthly management fee which covers services such as maintenance of properties and gardens, health and fitness clubs. These communities also offer extra support such as home care, catering.

== History ==
- The company was founded in 1983 under the name Beaumont Healthcare, by current chief executive Nick Sanderson and business partner Dr Andrew MacDonald.
- Between 1984 and 1987 it opened 12 care homes. Up until 1990 Beaumont opens seven Close Care projects and in 1990 it was acquired by Private Patients Plan Limited, a health insurer, now part of the AXA Group.
- In 1991 Nick Sanderson founded the brand Audley, aiming to develop luxury retirement homes able to provide care services.
- Between 1991 and 2015, Audley Villages developed multiple sites in partnership with housing associations and opened Audley Willicombe Park in Royal Tunbridge Wells, Audley Hollins Hall in Harrogate, Audley Inglewood in Berkshire, and Audley Binswood.
- In 2015 Audley was acquired for £158 million by a newly created Fund called Moorfield Audley Real Estate Fund. This was created especially for the purpose of buying Audley and was backed by many who were previously investors through the Moorfield Fund which owned Audley. It provided £170 million to build 1,000 new homes.
- The chief executive Nick Sanderson was presented with the Pathfinder Award for his work promoting the role of retirement villages at the HealthInvestor awards in 2016.
- In October 2016 the company acquired Red Kite Home Care, a home care provider in Buckinghamshire and in February 2018 the Scarcroft Estate in West Yorkshire, the former headquarters of Npower, followed by another acquisition of land in Cobham in August 2018.
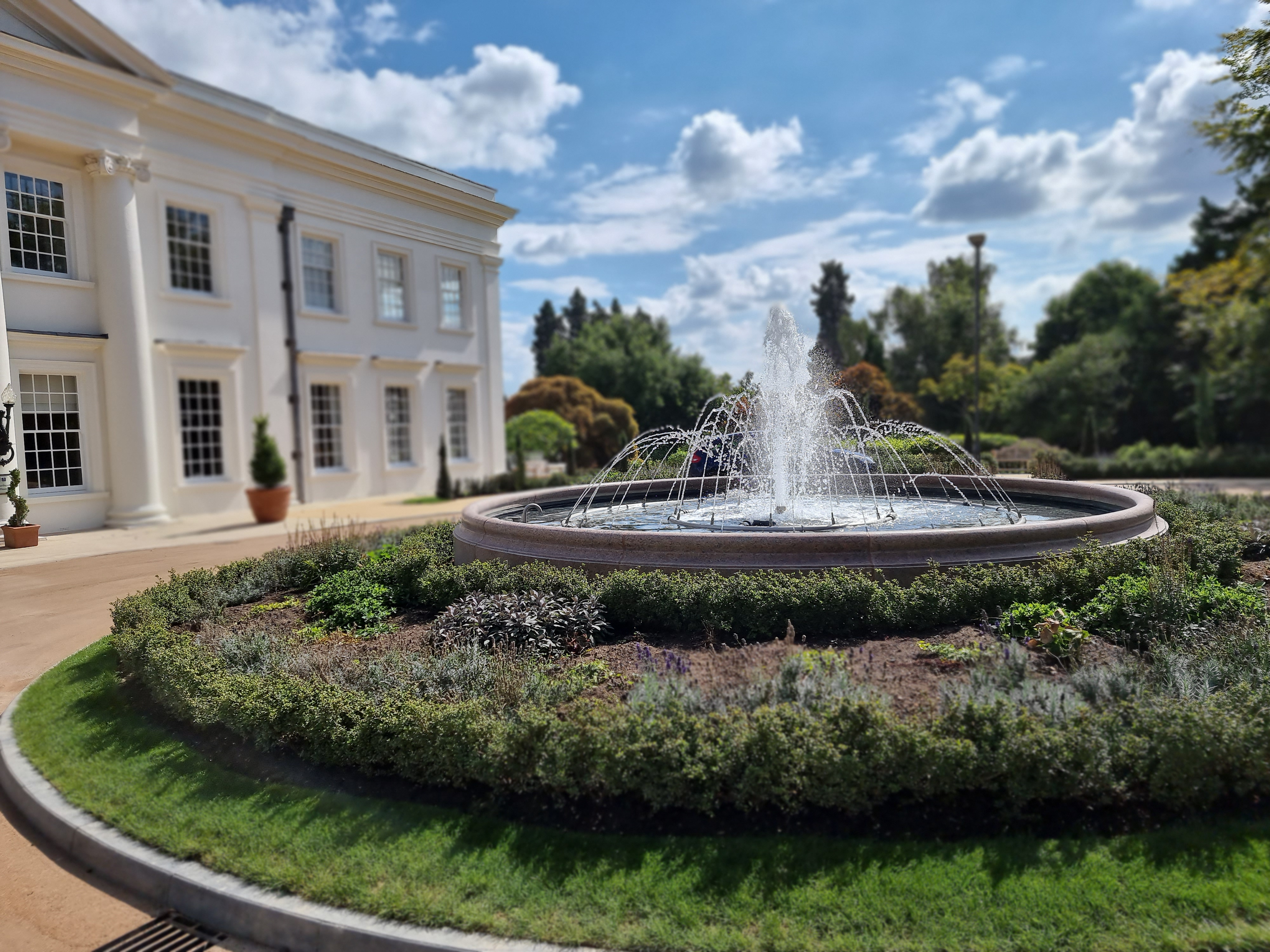
- Northcote House, Sunningdale Park, Ascot
  In 2019 it opened Audley Cooper's Hill in Englefield Green and Stanbridge Earls in Romsey.
- In 2020 it opened the first London village - Audley Nightingale Place.
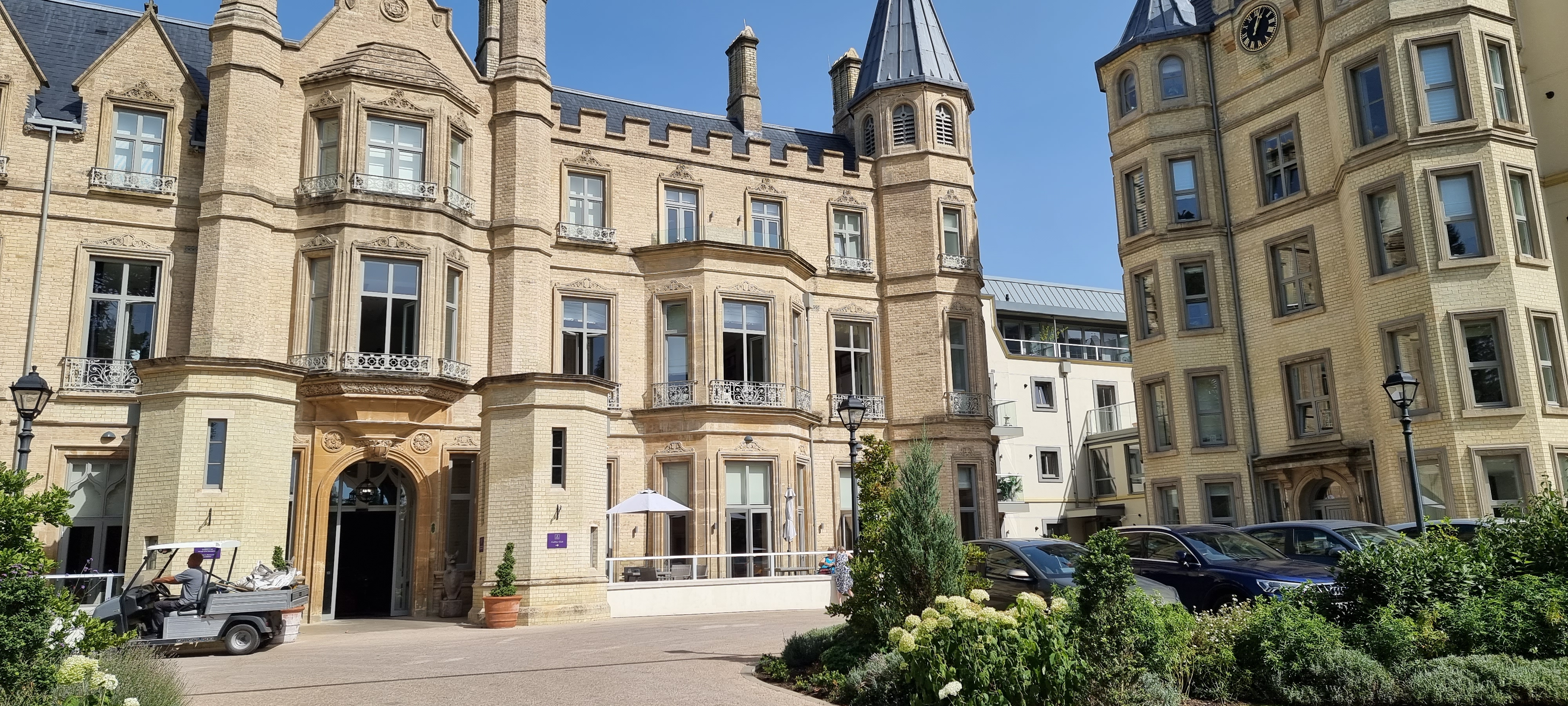
- Cooper's Hill House, Englefield Green
  In May 2021 - a £500 million joint venture with BlackRock Real Assets was set up, aiming to fund the development of three mid-market retirement villages.
- September 2022 - The first Mayfield village opens its doors to people willing to retire in Watford - official opening in February 2023.
- In 2023 - Audley Villages opens another two villages: Audley Sunningdale Park and Audley Fairmile. The same year first owners move into their properties at Audley Scarcroft Park in Leeds.
- Summer 2023 - Audley Group joins a multi-site joint venture with Senior Living Investment Partners (‘SLIP’) and Octopus Real Estate.
- November 2023 - official opening of a new village in Horsleys Green - Audley Wycliffe Park.
- In 2024 Audley starts construction of Audley Headley Court village, intended to bring back to life the Grade II listed historic mansion house and restore the extensive grounds.
- June 2024 - Audley Scarcroft Park officially opens
- July 2024 - Audley Sunningdale Park officially opens
- In 2024 Audley Group adds a new village to the portfolio - Audley Shiplake Meadows
- In 2025 Audley Group completes a new site in Lingfield, Surrey and announces merger with Elysian Residences.
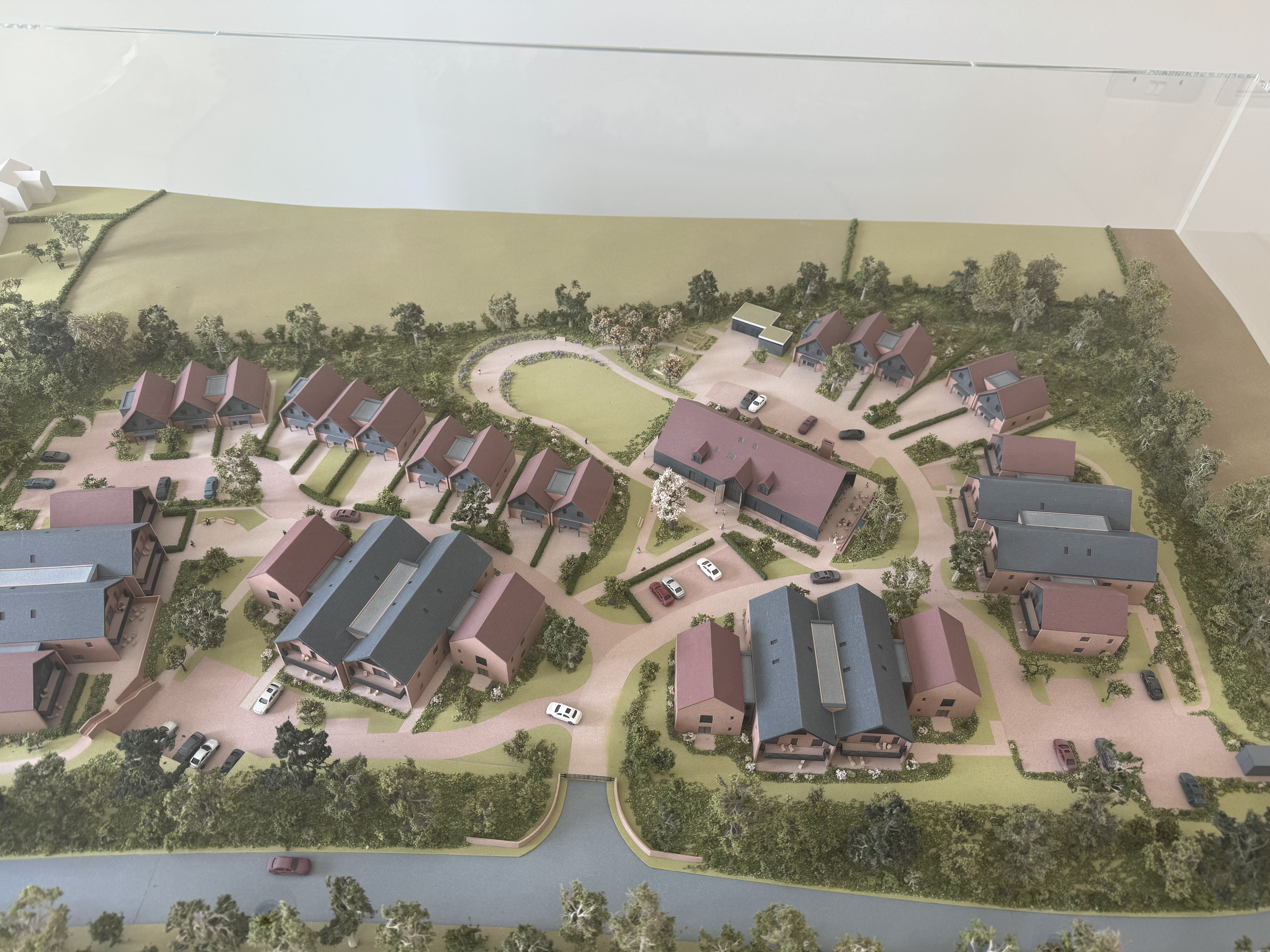
  Shiplake Meadows

The new brand, Mayfield Villages, is intended to be more affordable, and planned to have 2,500 more units over the next five years.

== Audley Villages locations ==
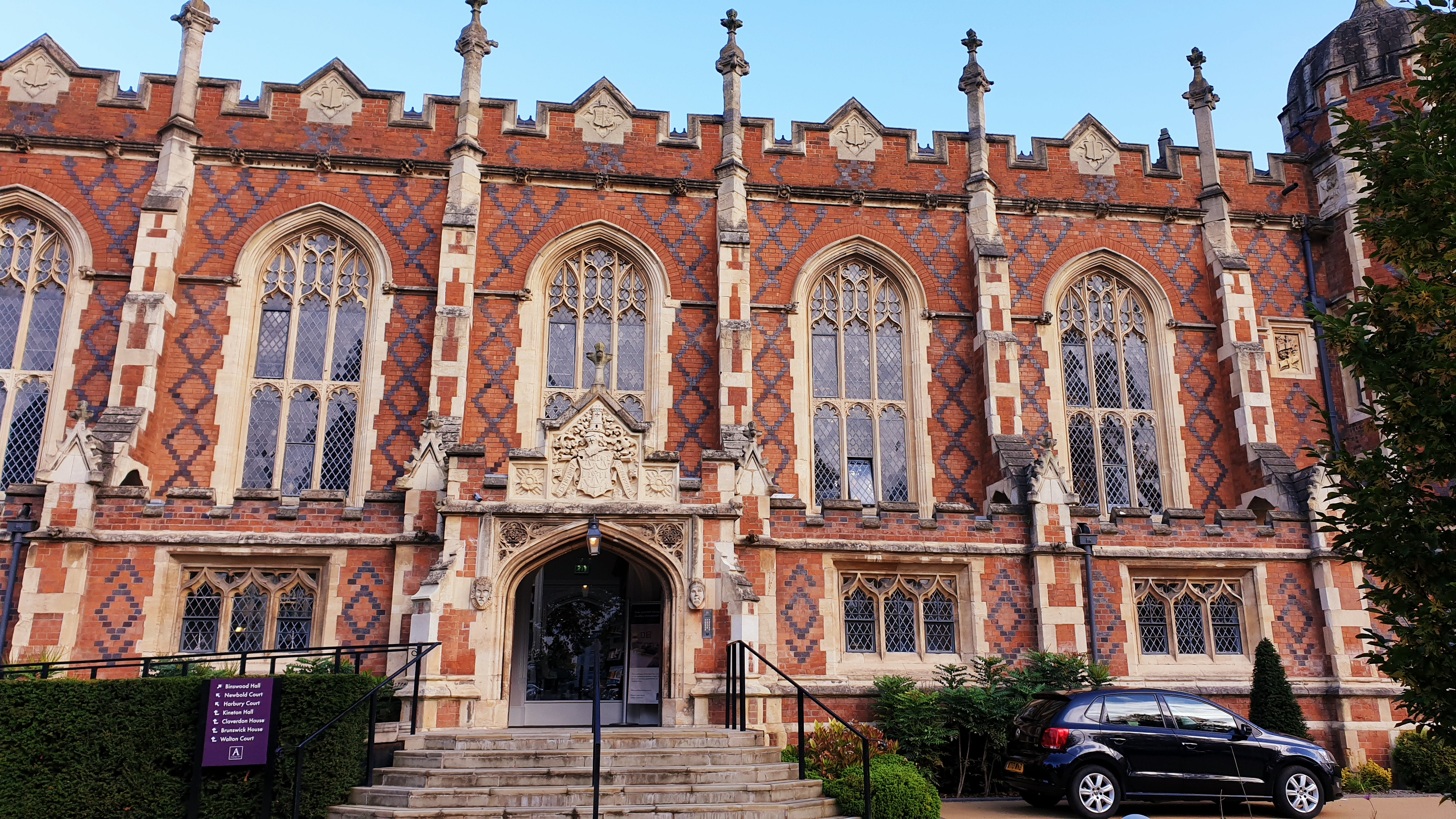
Binswood Hall

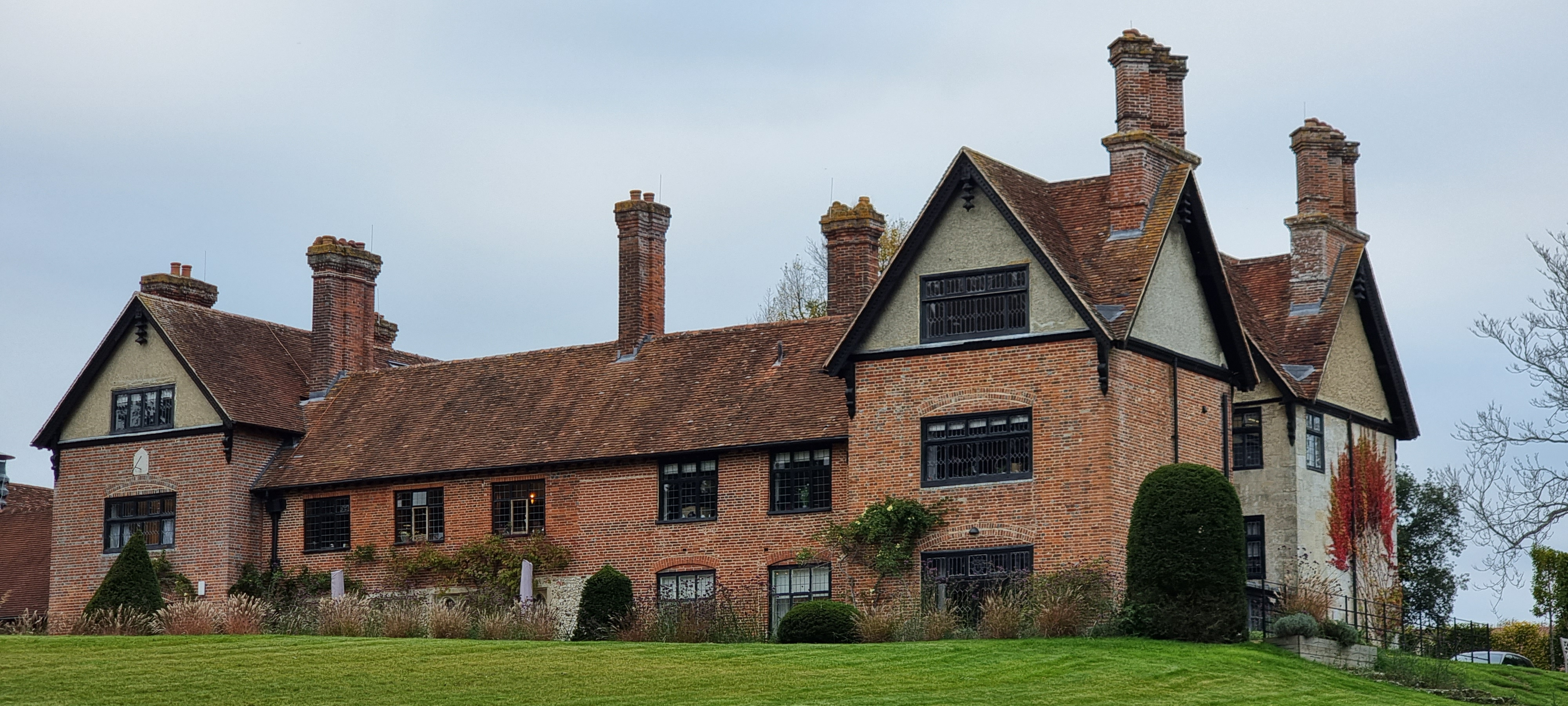
Stanbridge Manor House, Romsey

- Audley Willicombe Park in Tunbridge Wells is one of the first villages open for over 20 years and offering retirement properties, a gym, swimming pool, restaurant, and an in-house care team. In 2012 the apartments were selling for between £200,000 and £350,000.
- Audley St Elphin's Park, Darley Dale has 72 properties.
- Audley Stanbridge Earls near Romsey, Hampshire - a village of 155 retirement properties with the main school building retained and converted into a health club, restaurant and bistro.
- Audley Clevedon Ben Rhydding
- Audley Mote House, Mote Park near Bearsted - 85 apartments.
- Audley Inglewood, Kintbury, Berkshire
- Audley Chalfont Dene, Chalfont St Peter
- Audley Binswood Hall in Leamington Spa with a Grade II listed Gothic hall has a swimming pool, gym, restaurant, bar and bistro.
- Audley St George's Place, Edgbaston
- Audley Sunningdale Park was acquired in December 2016.
- Audley Redwood in Bristol opened in 2017
- Audley Ellerslie in Malvern opened in 2018
- Audley Cooper's Hill in Surrey
- Audley Nightingale Place, Clapham, London
- Audley Wycliffe Park, Horsleys Green, Buckinghamshire
- Audley Scarcroft, Leeds, West Yorkshire
- Audley Fairmile, Cobham
- Headley Court, Leatherhead
- Lingfield Grange, Surrey
- Shiplake Meadows, Henley-on-Thames
