= Devonshire Street (Westminster) =

Street in City of Westminster, London, England

Coordinates: 51.52158°N 0.14859°W

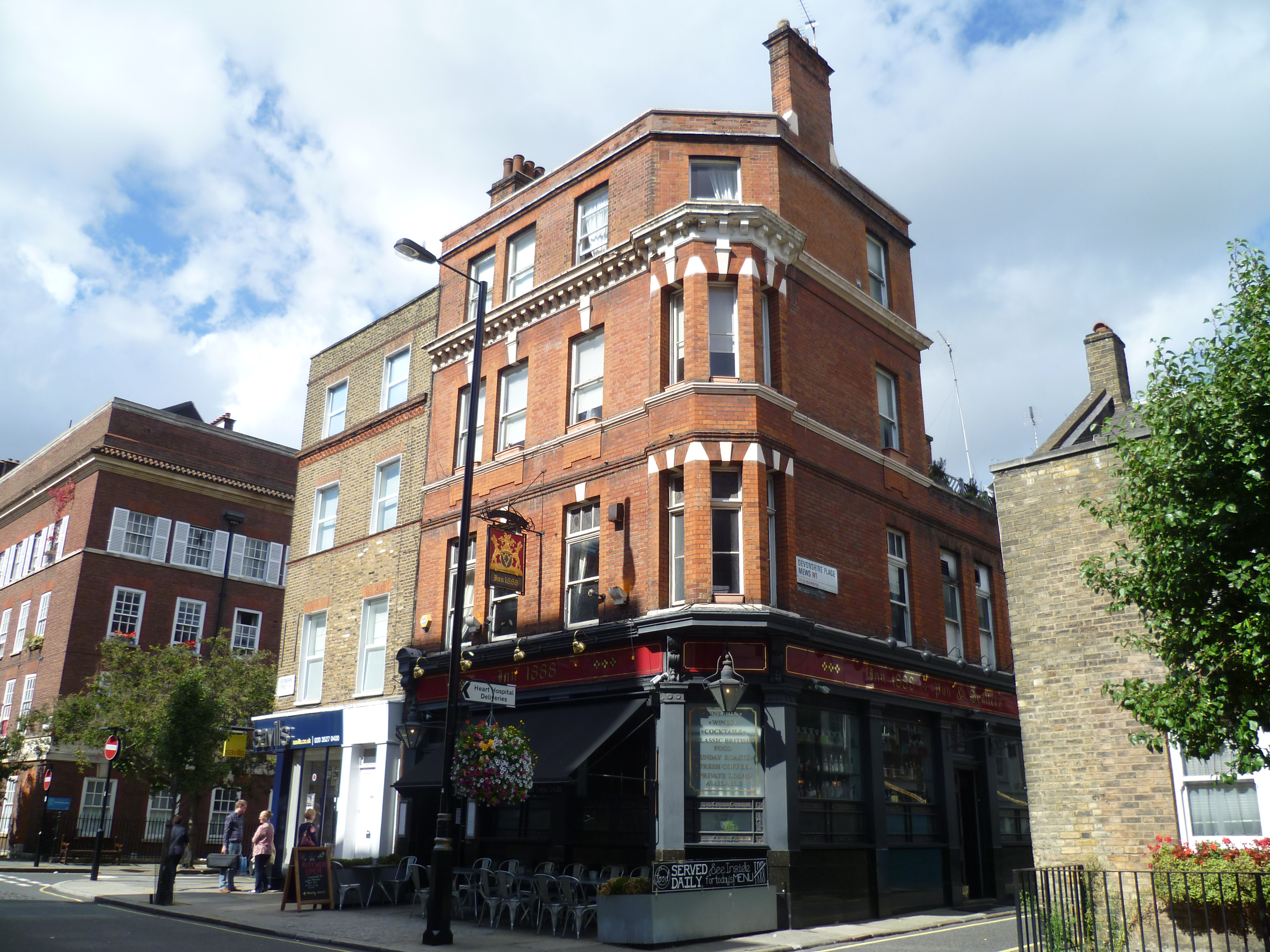
Inn 1888 Pub & Scullery, 21 Devonshire Street.

Devonshire Street is a street in the Marylebone district of the City of Westminster. Adjoining Harley Street, it is known for the number of medical establishments it contains.

The street is named after the 5th Duke of Devonshire, who was related to the ground landlord, the Duke of Portland.

== Location ==
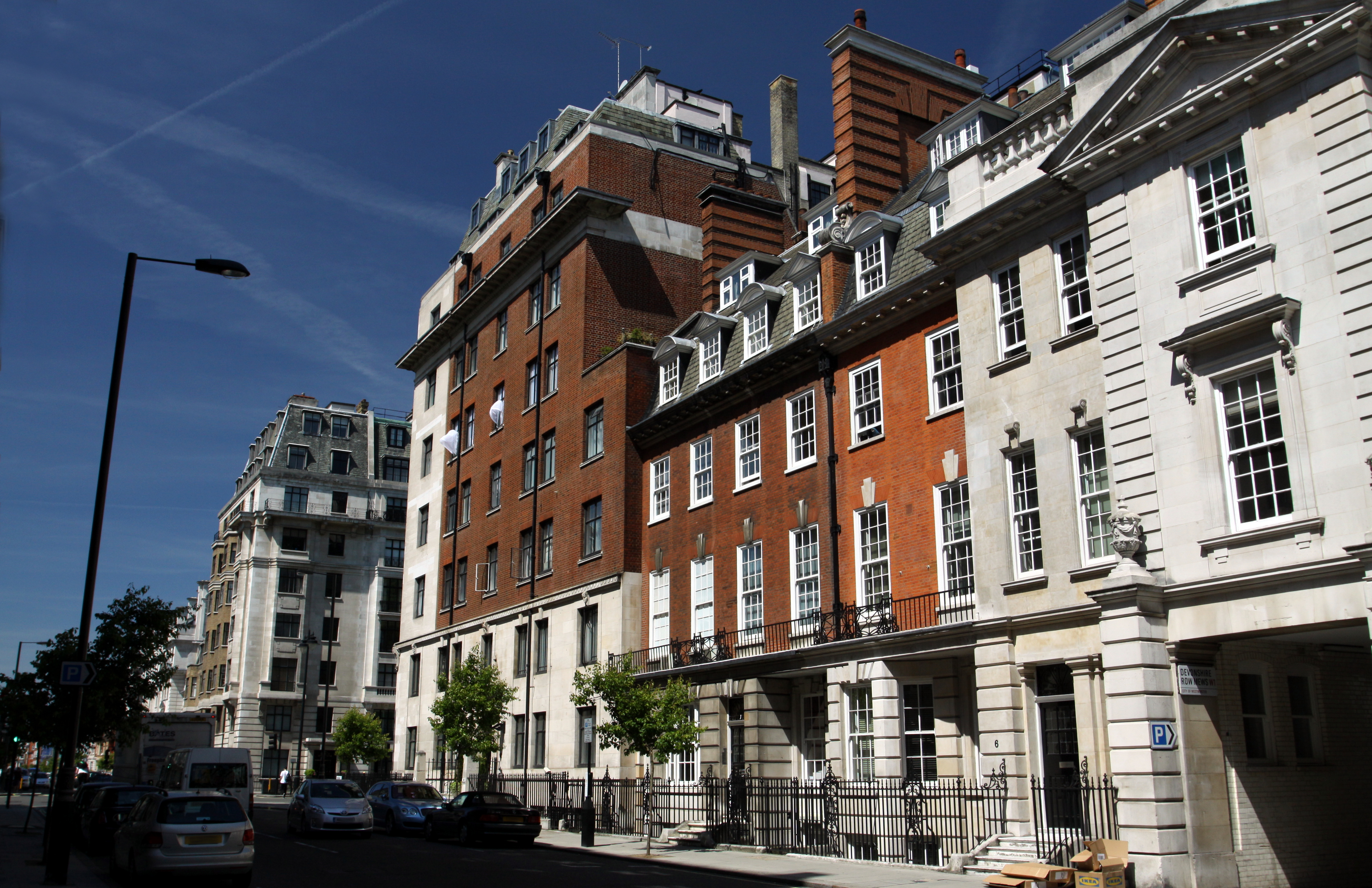
Devonshire Street north side between Devonshire Row Mews and Portland Place.

Devonshire Street runs from Great Portland Street in the east to Marylebone High Street in the west. Beaumont Street, Devonshire Place Mews, Devonshire Place, Devonshire Mews West, Harley Street, Devonshire Mews North, Portland Place, Devonshire Row Mews, and Hallam Street all adjoin Devonshire Street on its north side.

On its south side, Beaumont Street, Dunstable Mews, Upper Wimpole Street, Devonshire Mews South, Harley Street, Devonshire Close, Portland Place, Bridford Mews, and Hallam Street all join Devonshire Street on its south side.

== Buildings ==
The Royal Philatelic Society London was formerly located on the corner of Devonshire Street and Devonshire Place.

The Embassy of Chile in the United Kingdom was located in the street until 2009.

== Gallery ==
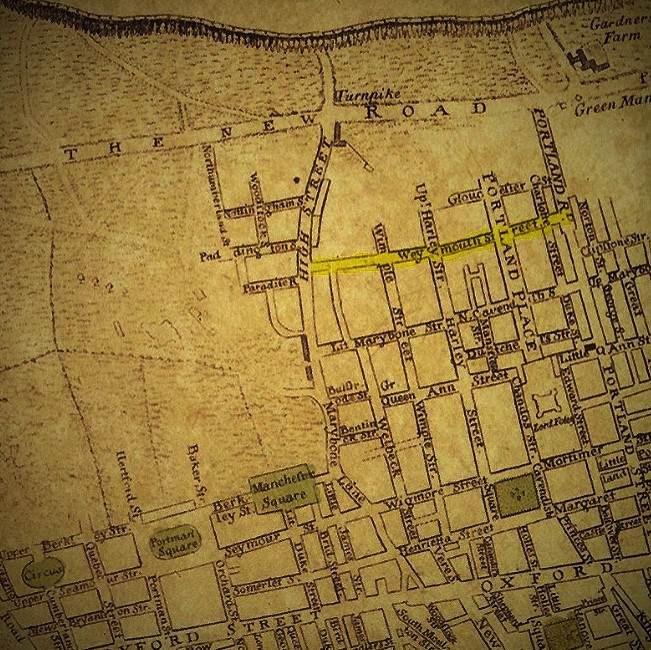
Map clipping of Marylebone from around 1770 before Devonshire Street had been laid out

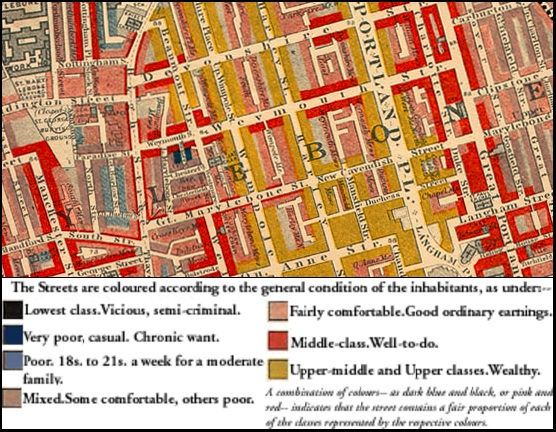
Extract from Charles Booth's 1889 survey of the lives and occupations of area residents
