= Embassy of Chile, London =

Embassy of Chile in London
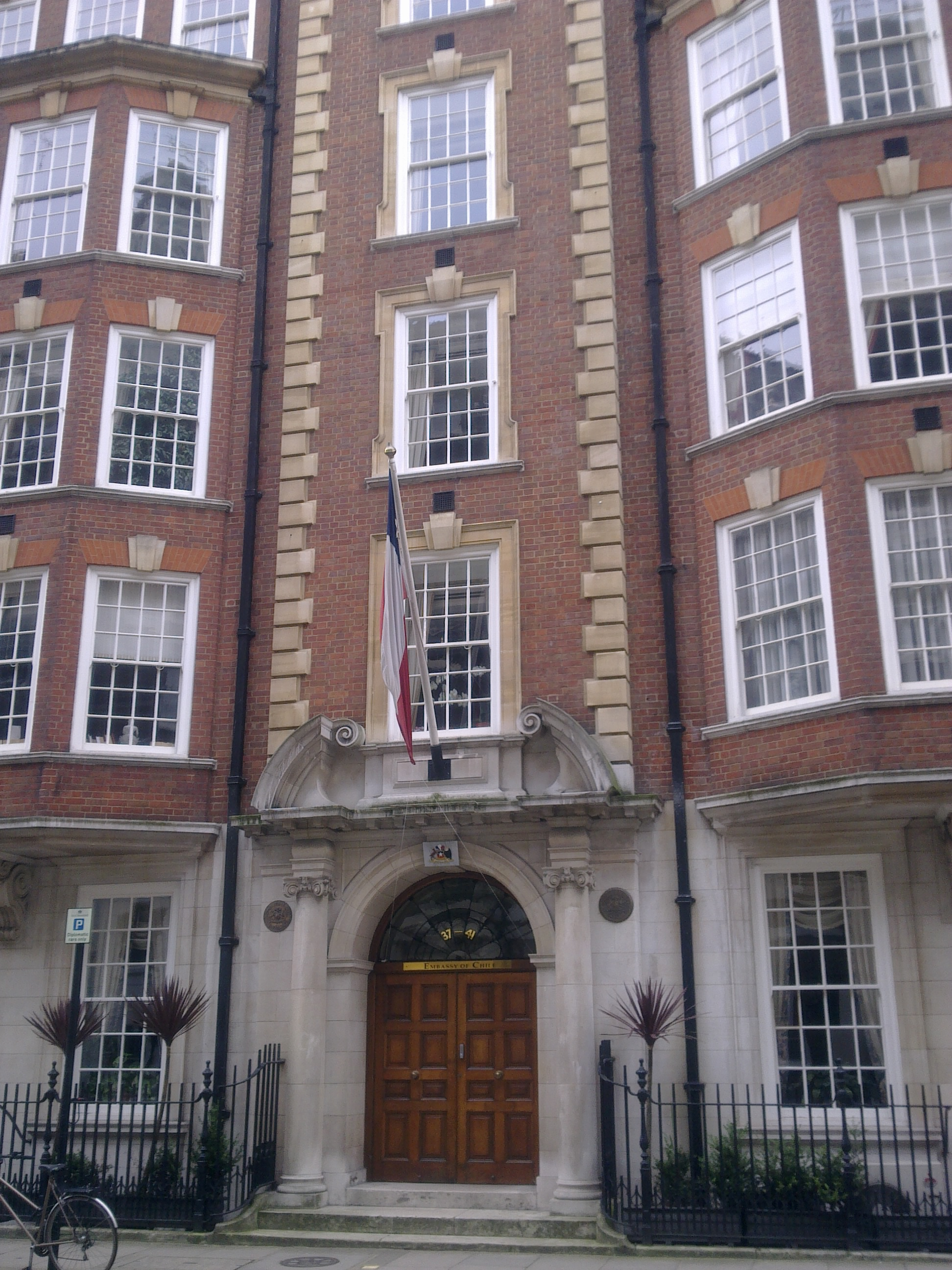
- Location: Westminster, London
- Address: 37-41 Old Queen Street, London, SW1H 9JA
- Coordinates: 51°30′2.2″N 0°7′53.1″W

The Embassy of Chile in London is the diplomatic mission of Chile in the United Kingdom. The embassy was formerly located on Devonshire Street in Marylebone before moving to its current site in 2009.

== Heads of mission ==
=== Ministers ===
- 1910 to 1924: Agustín Edwards Mac-Clure

=== Ambassadors ===
- 1929/1930 to 1933: Enrique Villegas
- 2006 to 2010: Rafael Moreno Rojas
- 2014 to 2018: Rolando Drago Rodríguez
- 2018 to 2022: David Gallagher Patrickson
- 2022 to 2023: Susana Herrera Quezada

== Gallery ==
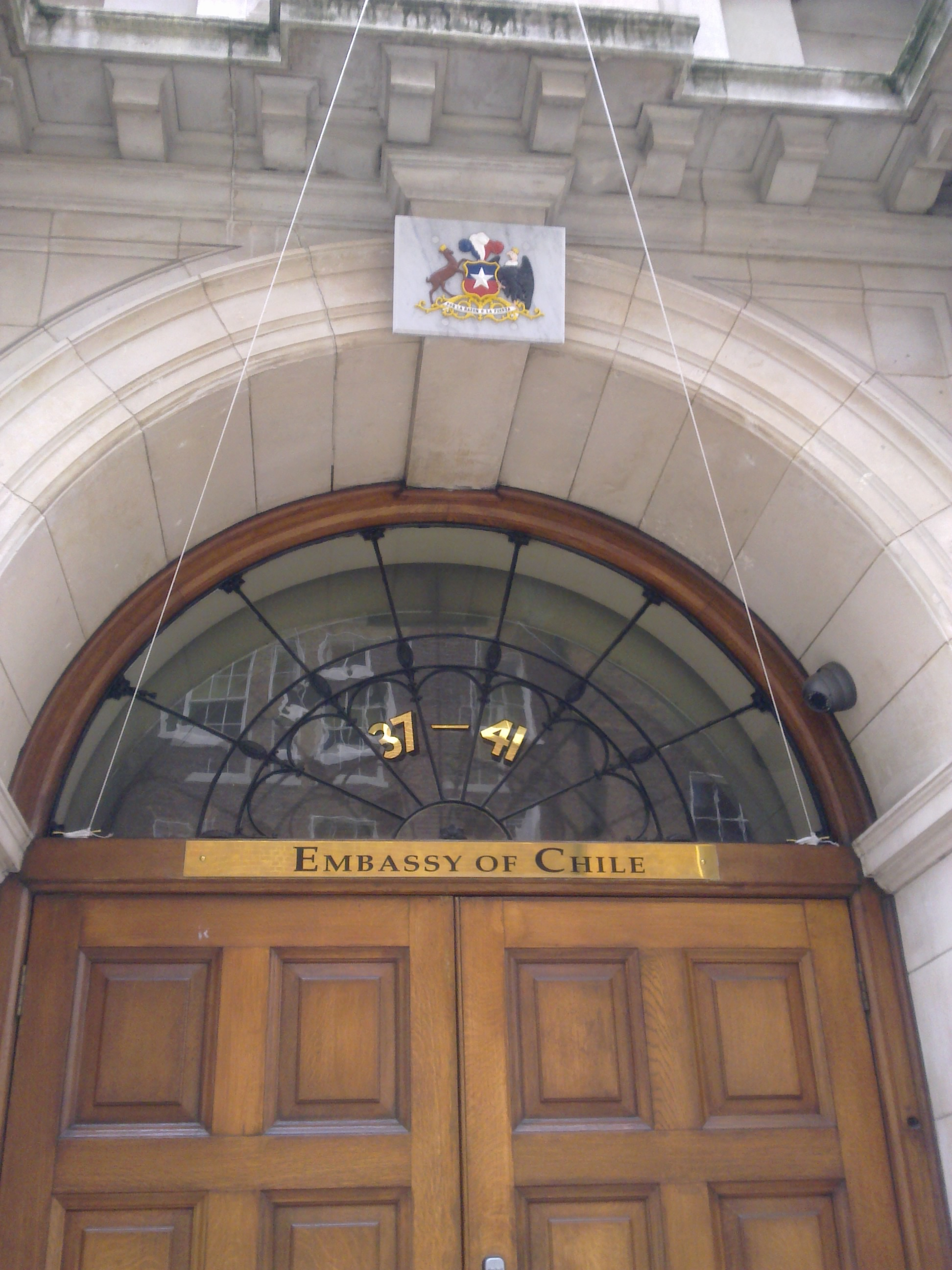
Close-up of the embassy entrance; the Coat of arms of Chile can be seen above the door

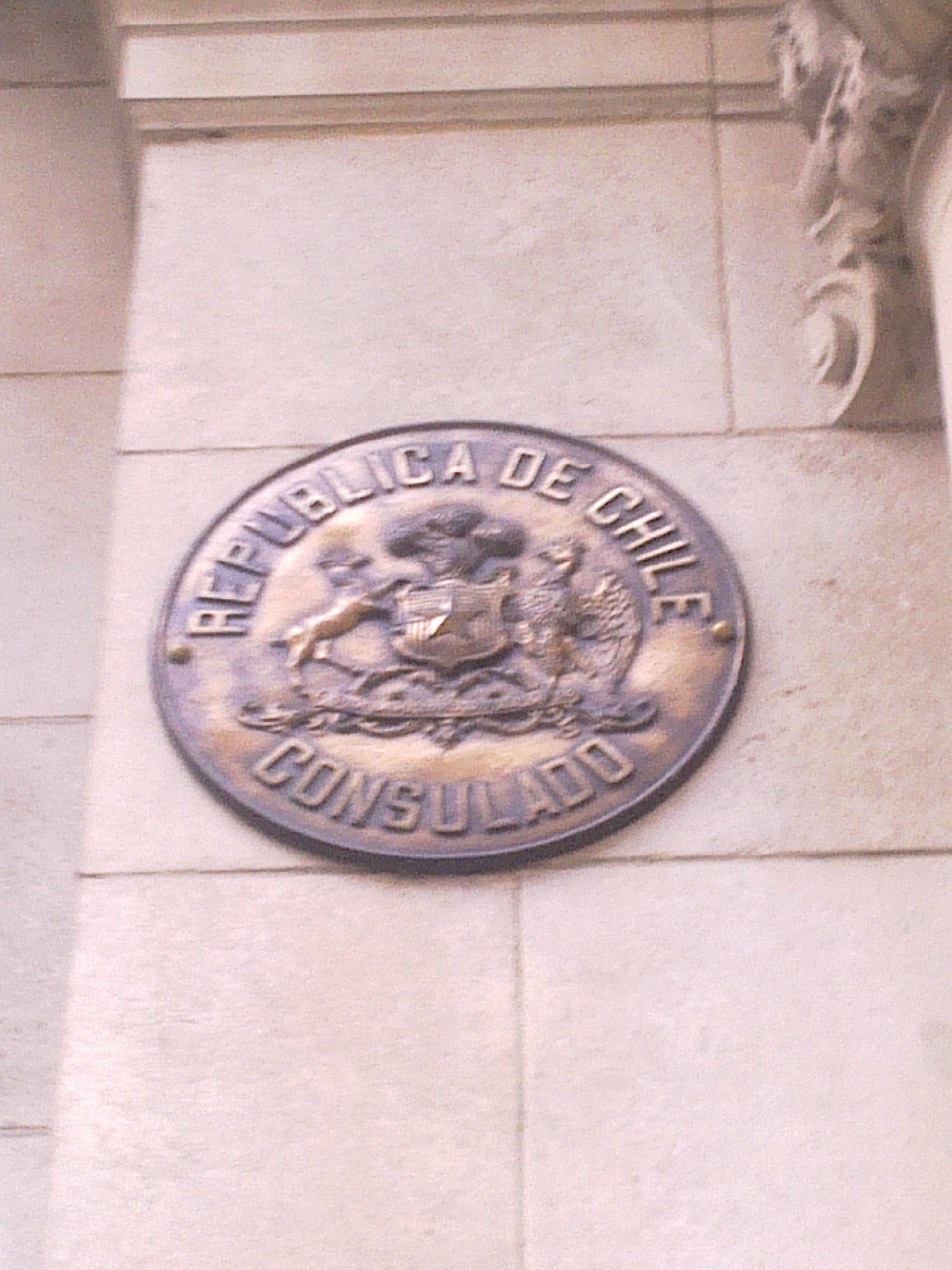
Plaque outside the embassy

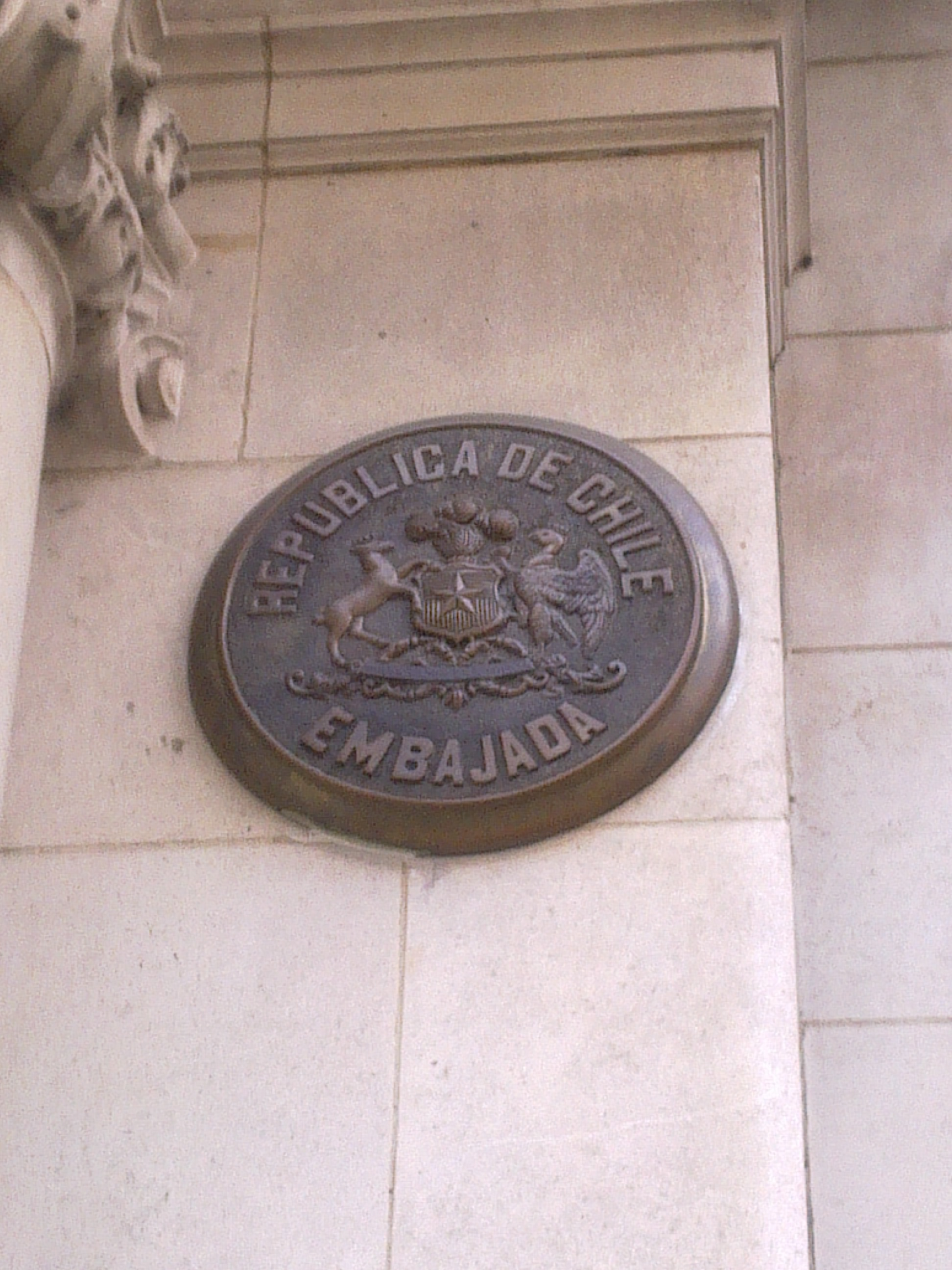
Plaque outside the embassy
