= National School of Government =

UK government agency

Coordinates: 51.4030°N 0.6396°W

Agency overview
- Dissolved: 31 March 2012
- Superseding agency: Cabinet Office
- Jurisdiction: United Kingdom
- Headquarters: Sunningdale Park, Larch Avenue, Ascot, SL5 0QE
- Employees: 232
- Annual budget: £31.3 million (2008–09)
- Agency executive: Rod Clark, Principal and Chief Executive
- Website: www.gov.uk/government/organisations/national-school-of-government

The National School of Government (previously known as the Civil Service College and the Centre for Management and Policy Studies, or CMPS) was the part of the Cabinet Office that ran training, organisational development and consultancy courses for UK civil servants and private individual learners. It was mostly based at Sunningdale Park, near Ascot in Berkshire, but had other centres on Belgrave Road in London, and later in Edinburgh.

== History ==
A successor to the Civil Service Department's Centre for Administrative Studies, (1968-1970) the Civil Service College was established at Sunningdale Park in June 1970. It evolved to become the National School of Government which also managed Sunningdale Institute – a virtual academy of leading thinkers on management, organisation and governance.

The National School of Government closed on 31 March 2012, with only a few of its main functions being taken on by a new body, Civil Service Learning, which is part of the Cabinet Office. The closure was expected to create annual savings of £90 million.

In 2021, it was announced by the Government Skills and Curriculum Unit (GSCU) that the Government Campus will be formed, to unite all government training, whether provided centrally, or designed and delivered by professions, functions, and departments.

== Sunningdale Institute ==
The Sunningdale Institute was an academy managed by the National School of Government, described as "a virtual academy of leading thinkers on management, organisation and governance".
