= Devonshire Close =

Street in London

Coordinates: 51.5214°N 0.1470°W

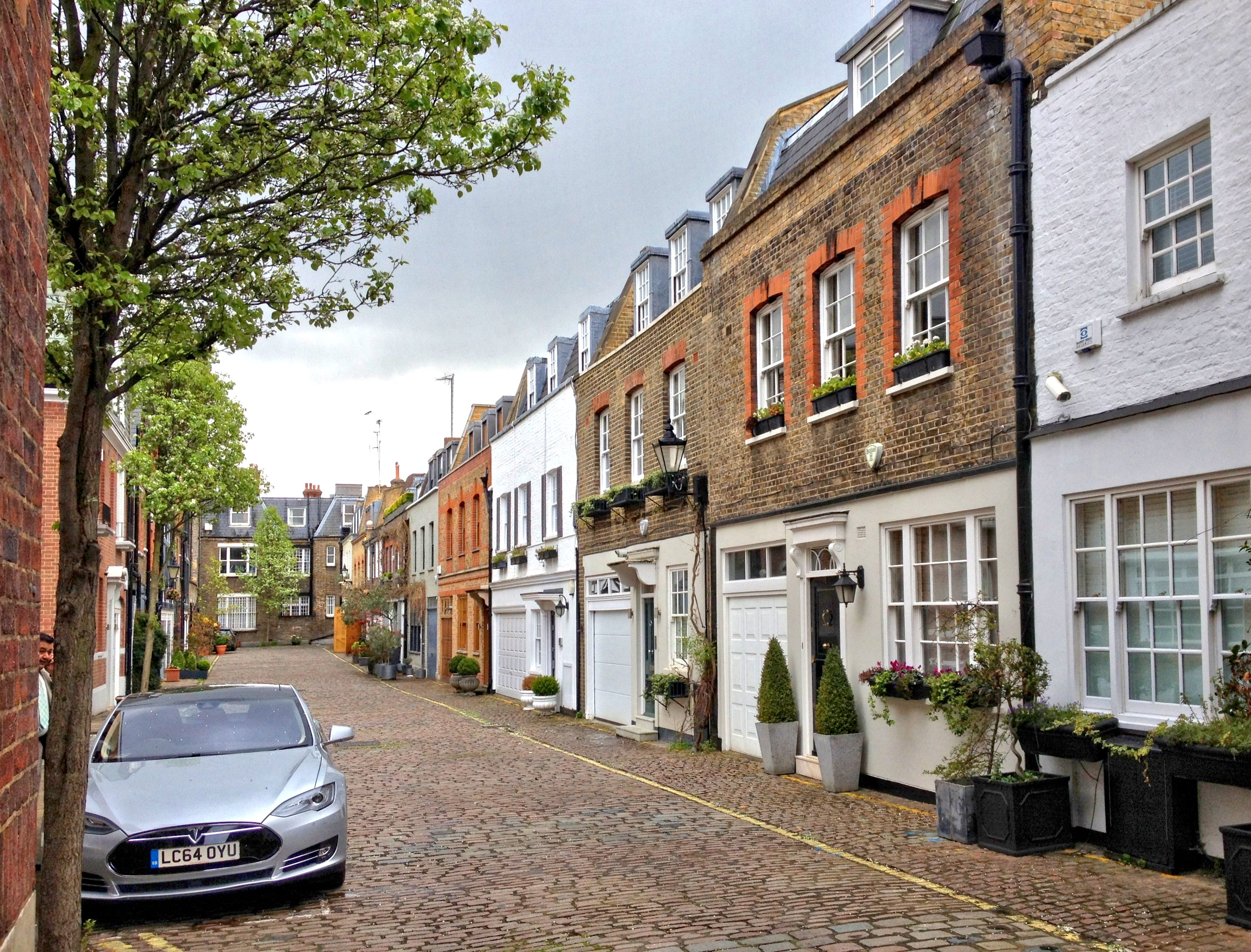
Devonshire Close

Devonshire Close, originally known as Devonshire Mews East, is a mews street in the City of Westminster, London, accessed from Devonshire Street. The Close is on a distinctive H plan with a middle downwards leg. It dates from the 1770s and originally contained a timber yard, stables, and accommodation for domestic servants who worked in the larger houses surrounding it. Access was limited to the north side in order to divert traffic from the grander north–south streets around it. The Close was gentrified in the 20th century and its buildings converted to mews houses which, like other mews in London, have become desirable in the modern era because they are quiet and have little traffic. The Close is now part of the Howard de Walden Estate.

== Origins and layout ==
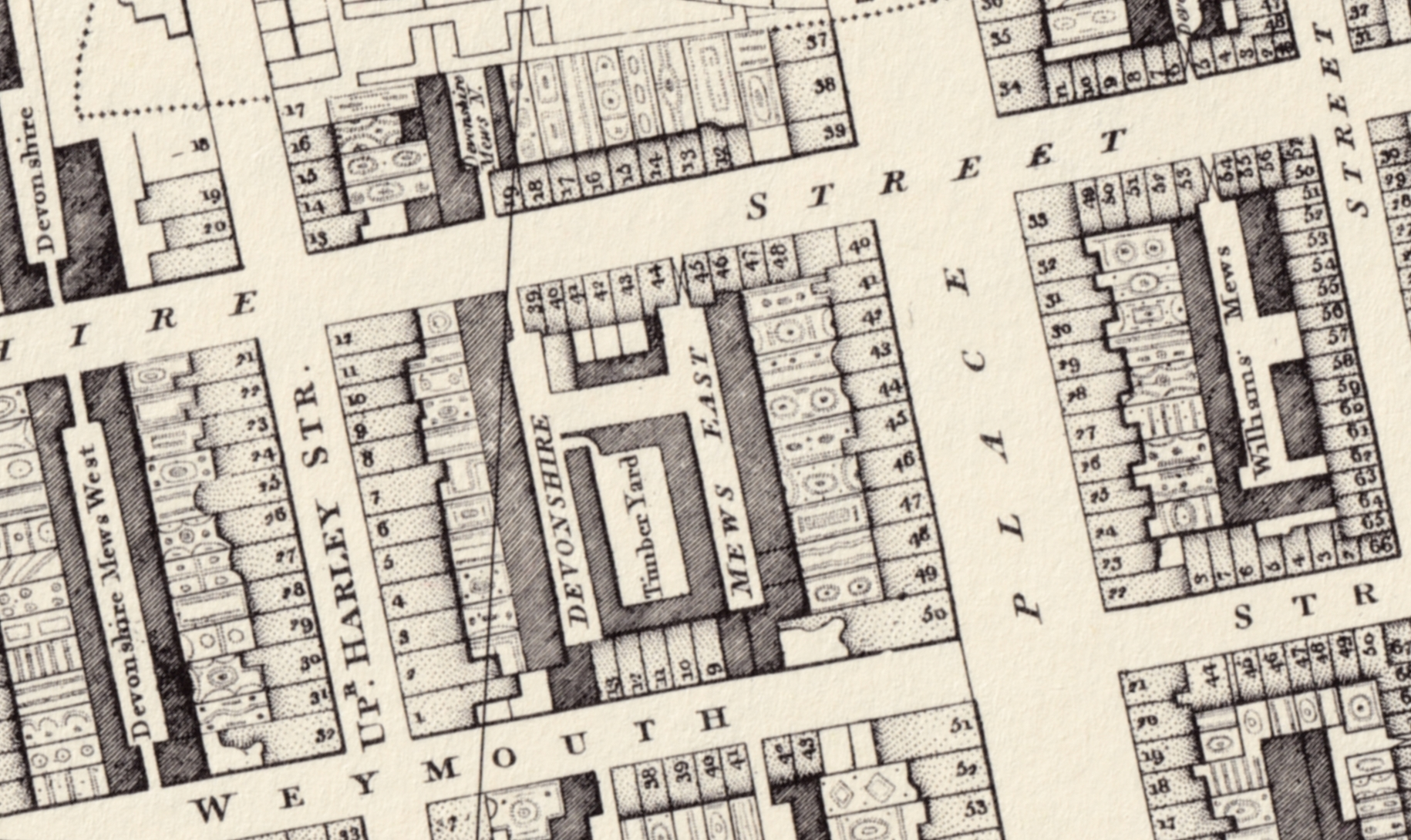
Devonshire Mews East on Richard Horwood's map, 1813 edition.

The Close was laid out in the 1770s and was known as Devonshire Mews East until 1934. It is one of a number of "Devonshire" streets in the vicinity and like Devonshire Street, from which it is accessed, derived its name from Dorothy Cavendish, later Duchess of Portland, daughter of the 4th Duke of Devonshire.

When developed, Devonshire Street was of somewhat lower social status than the north–south streets and the southern reaches of what is now the Howard de Walden Estate. Accordingly, access to the Mews was only from the north side, rather than the east or west which might impede the north–south flow of traffic, and without a southern entrance or exit.

== 19th century ==
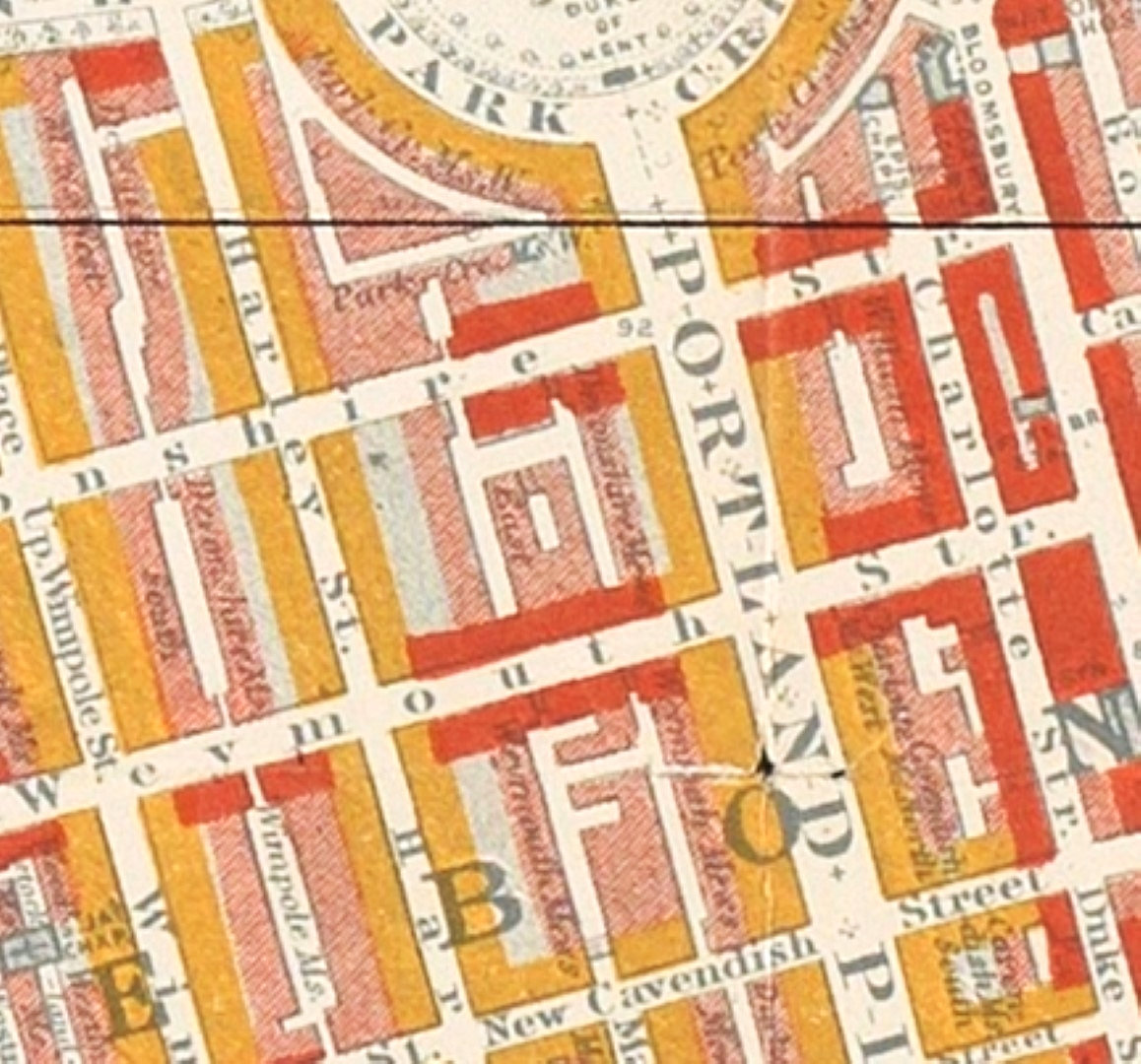
Devonshire Close (centre) on Charles Booth's poverty map of 1889 with levels of household wealth shown in different colours

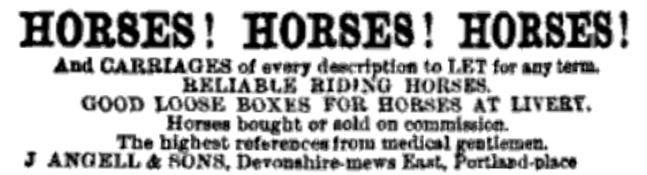
Advert for horses with references available from medical gentlemen, 1893.

The Close was originally the site of a timber yard and would also have had stables for horses and accommodation for servants working in the large houses surrounding it. Charles Booth's poverty map shows the different levels of household wealth inside and outside the Close in 1889 with the houses of the upper classes being shown in yellow, the middle class in red, and the Close marked in pink, meaning "fairly comfortable" or "good ordinary earnings". The Cape of Good Hope public house was on the north side until 1932 and gave its name to Cape of Good Hope Mews which replaced the timber yard in the 19th century.

== 20th century ==
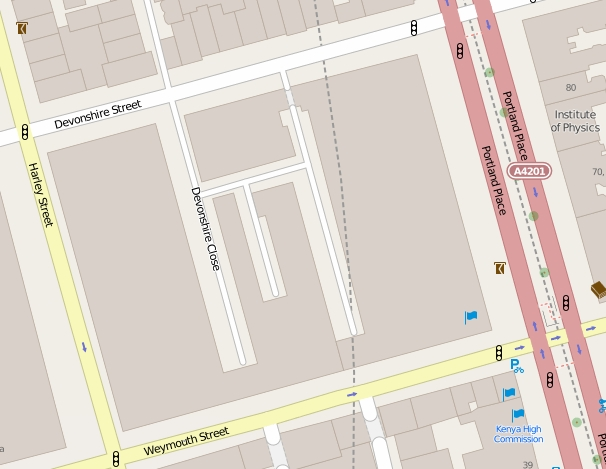
Devonshire Close map, 2022

The Survey of London writes of the area that by the start of the 20th century, "the bijou house on side streets or at the back was now making its debut, as motor garages supplanted stinking stables and the mews became detoxified." The timber yard was replaced with mews houses in 1926–27 and extensive gentrification took place in the Close during the early and mid-20th century as buildings were improved or replaced. The Close's original utilitarian buildings were subject to "prettification" during their conversion to private residential use and others were rebuilt in a much more "architectural" style.

40 Devonshire Street, a "mews side-house" which is on the corner of the western entrance to the Close, was built in the 1930s in what Historic England describe as the "arts and crafts Georgian revival" style. It has been grade II listed since 1987. Number 39, inside the Close, was part of the same plot of land as number 40. It was completed in 1934 and noted by Pevsner for its combination of modernism and tradition. Both were designed by Francis Lorne and Ludovic Gordon Farquhar of Burnet, Tait & Lorne for Vincent Gluckstein, chairman of Bovis, who intended to clear the site and build housing. Number 40 was occupied as a house but the modernist 39 was acquired by G. Grey Wornum who used it as the base for his architectural practice, possibly because its modern style did not suit the rest of the area.

Cottage conversions continued after the Second World War at, for instance, number 3 in 1962 and number 2 in 1970–71. Number 32 was converted to offices in 1986. The Survey of London point out the irony that these and similar London mews, once the home of servants and horses and with limited access from the grander streets that surround them, have now become desirable homes precisely because they are quiet and have little traffic.
