= Sunningdale Park =

Country estate in Berkshire, England

- Sunningdale Park
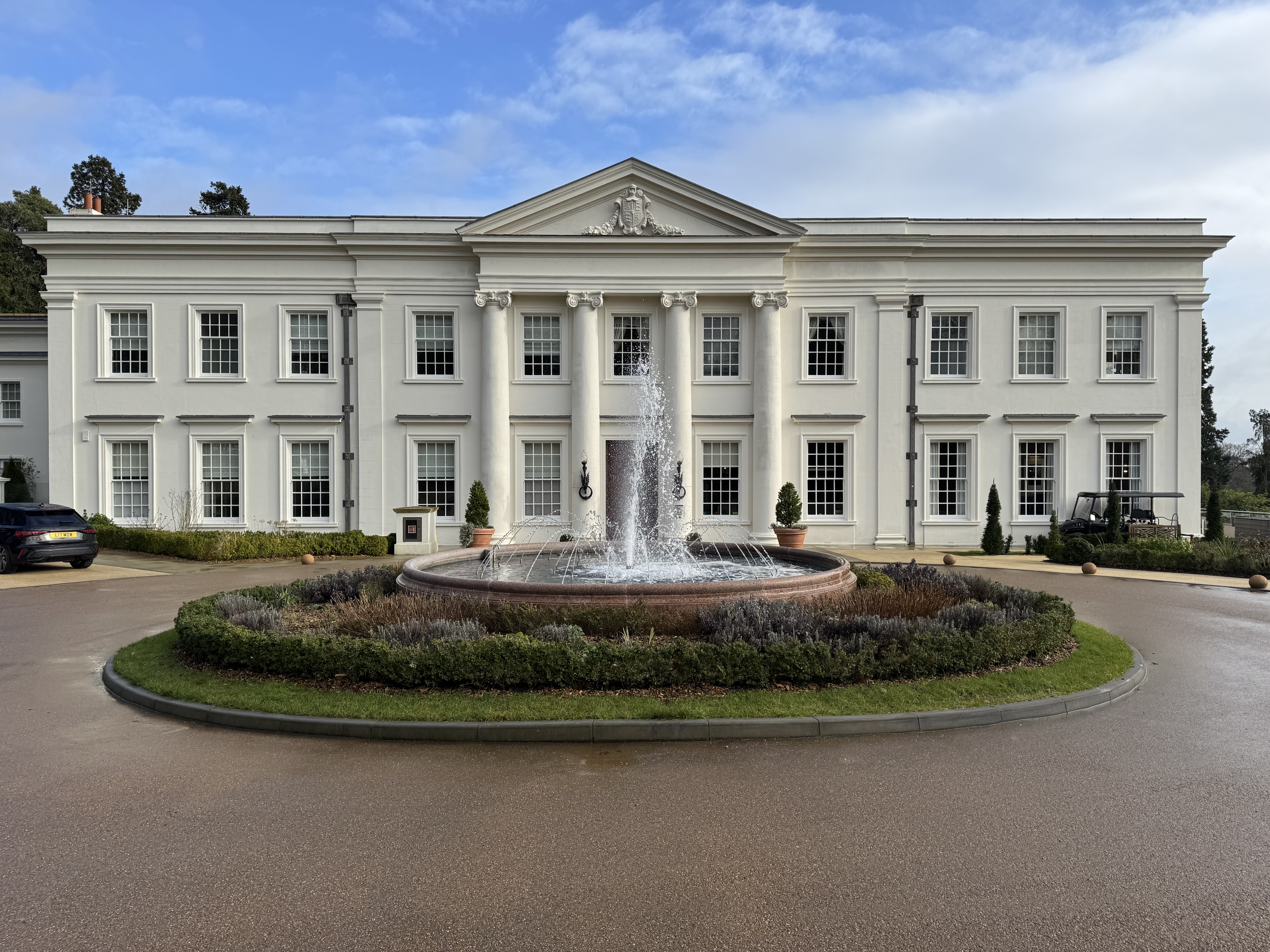
- Northcote House in Sunningdale Park
- Interactive map of Sunningdale Park
- Location: Sunningdale, Berkshire
- Nearest city: London
- Coordinates: 51°24′11″N 0°38′22″W
- Area: 32 hectares (79 acres)
- Owner: Private
- Open: All year
- Parking: Yes
- Facilities: Restaurant

Listed Building – Grade II
- Official name: Northcote House
- Designated: 26 June 1998; 28 years ago
- Reference no.: 1323678

National Register of Historic Parks and Gardens
- Official name: Sunningdale Park
- Designated: 18 February 2003; 23 years ago
- Reference no.: 1001667

Sunningdale Park is a country estate centred around a property known as Northcote House in Sunningdale, Berkshire.

Northcote House is Grade II listed on the National Heritage List for England, with the lake, gardens and parkland also separately Grade II listed and on the Register of Historic Parks and Gardens. The lodges, kitchen gardens and stables are also part of the Grade II listing.

== History ==
The house is thought to have been built by James Wyatt, almost certainly for James William Steuart, a farmer, in around 1787. It was acquired by Sir Charles Decimus Crosley, a former Sheriff of London from the Steuart family in 1859. It then passed to Sir James Thompson Mackenzie, 1st Baronet in 1883, to Major William James Joicey, the then serving High Sheriff of Durham, in 1890 and to Sir Hugo Cunliffe-Owen, an industrialist, in 1930.

Northcote House accommodated the Civil Defence College from 1950 until it closed in 1968. The Civil Service College was then established in the building in June 1970. The ill-fated Sunningdale Agreement on power-sharing in Northern Ireland was signed in Northcote House on 9 December 1973.

The Civil Service College evolved to become the National School of Government, which provided training, organisational development and consultancy courses for UK civil servants and private individual learners until its closure in March 2012. In March 2015, the College of Policing opened an office in the Albert Day building. Sunningdale Park was then sold to Audley Retirement and Berkeley Homes in December 2016.

== Architecture ==
In grounds of 65 acres (26 ha) there is a Grade II listed neo-Georgian mansion called Northcote House, which was built in 1930, and in which notable features include the grand staircase and front portico. The landscaped park and gardens are Grade II listed on the Register of Historic Parks and Gardens.

== Gallery ==
Sunningdale Park Images

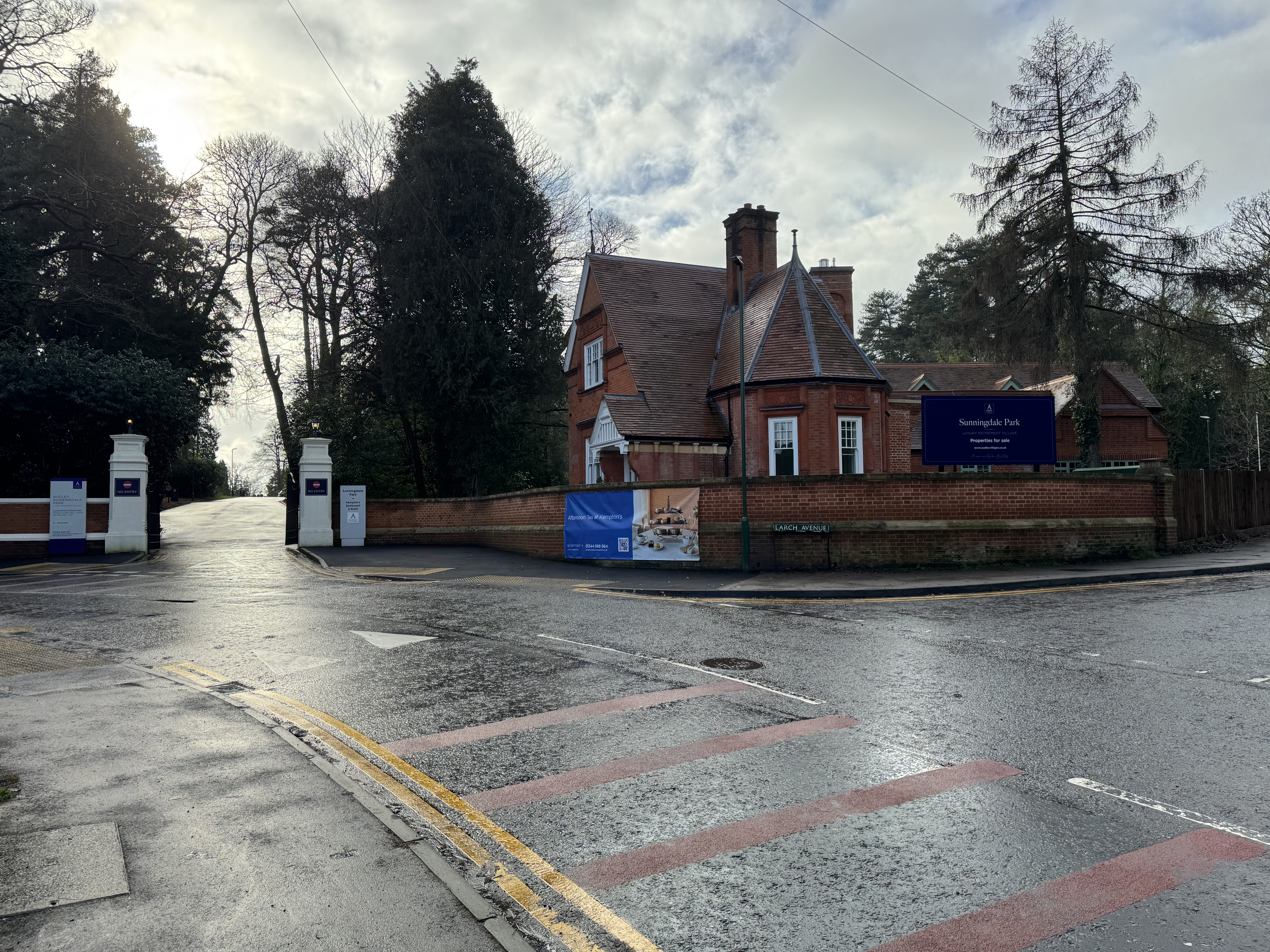
The estate's main entrances with North Lodge located on the right

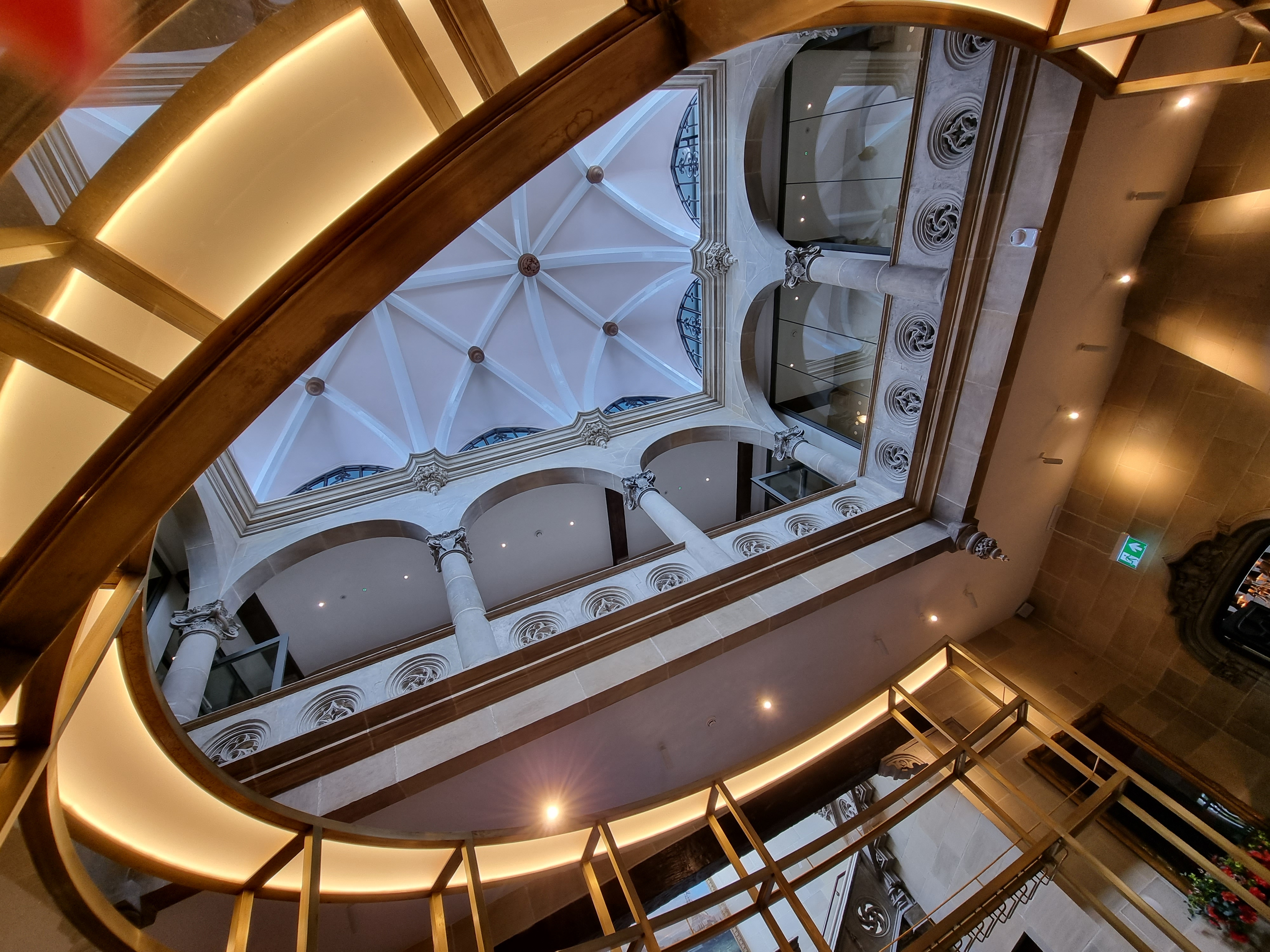
View onto the first floor from within main hall in Northcote House

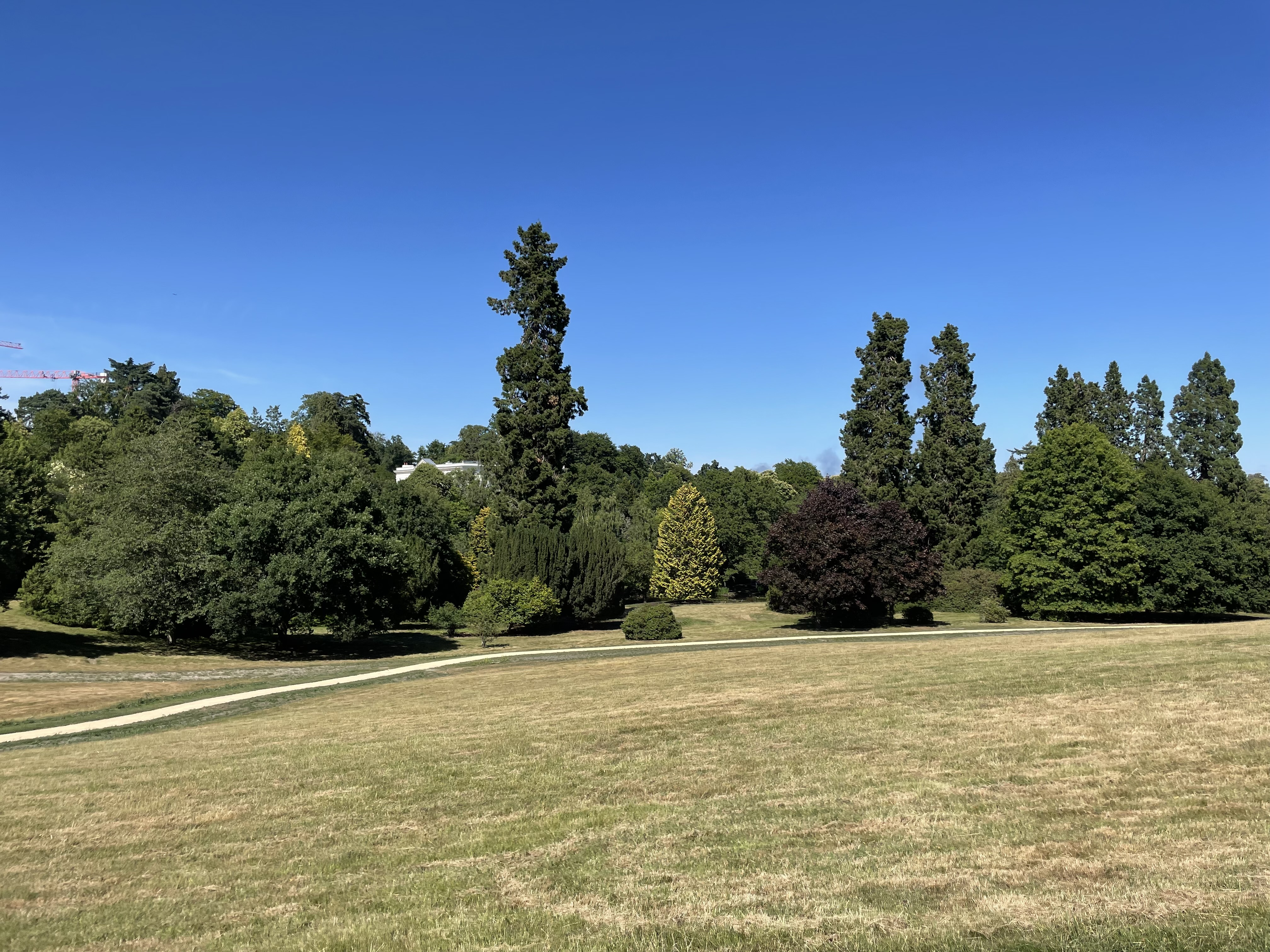
The estate parklands and arboretum
