= Devonshire Place =

Street in the City of Westminster

Coordinates: 51°31′20.3″N 0°09′00.4″W

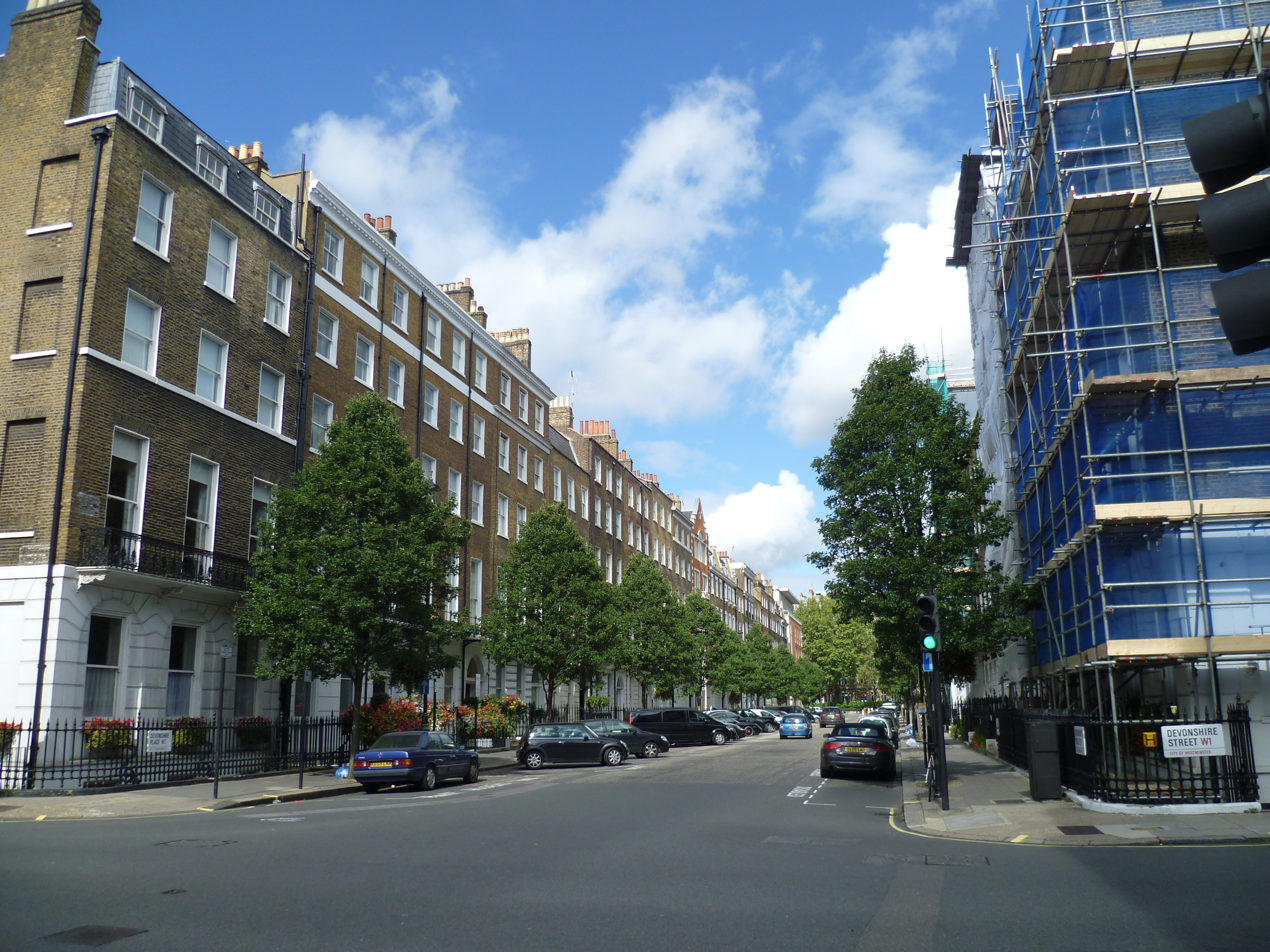
Devonshire Place south end from Devonshire Street

Devonshire Place is a street in the City of Westminster, that runs from Marylebone Road in the north to Devonshire Street in the south. A number of literary and society figures have lived in the street. At the north of the street is The London Clinic, one of England's largest private hospitals.

== History ==
Devonshire Place was built between c1788 and 1800 on the Portland Estate (Howard de Walden since c1900). Originally part of Upper Wimpole Street, it took its present name by 1791. The name reflects the close family connection between the Dukes of Portland and the Duke of Devonshire. Most of the original houses survive, built under the supervision of builder and surveyor John White. They were big houses with large frontages and White built his own house at the top end - Devonshire Place House.

== Buildings and inhabitants ==
William Beckford, millionaire landowner, politician and author of the Gothic novel Vathek, lived for a time at No. 4. Matthew Lewis, author of another Gothic novel, The Monk, lived at No. 9 and William Rothenstein lived at No. 10. Sir Thomas Baring, 2nd Baronet, banker and politician, lived at No. 21 between 1804 and 1840,

The Royal Philatelic Society London was located on the corner of Devonshire Street and Devonshire Place at the south end of the street until 2019.
