= HealthInvestor =

British health investor magazine

HealthInvestor UK
- Editor: Rob Munro
- Categories: Healthcare sector
- Frequency: Monthly and online
- Publisher: Nexus Media Group (formerly Investor Publishing Ltd)
- Country: United Kingdom
- Based in: London
- Language: English
- Website: healthinvestor.co.uk

HealthInvestor UK is a British monthly magazine and website produced by Nexus Media Group, London.

It covers the private hospital market and independent NHS providers in the UK. It carries company results and runs an index of the prices of UK healthcare companies traded on the London Stock Exchange, the Alternative Investment Market and PLUS Markets. According to the British Healthcare Trades Association it is the UK healthcare industry's most respected information source.

== History ==
Since 2006 it has organised annual awards for leaders in the private healthcare sector, and legal advisers. The 2015 event was attended by over 1,300 professionals in the industry. The 2016 event was held at London's Grosvenor House Hotel. HealthInvestor now organises six events nationally and in 2019 is hosting a conference in Chicago for US investors interesting in the UK healthcare market.
