= George Edwards =

George Edwards may refer to:

== Academics ==
- George Edwards (marching band director) (1948–2009), director of bands for Prairie View A&M University
- George Edwards (naturalist) (1694–1773), English naturalist and ornithologist
- George C. Edwards III (born 1947), American academic and political scientist

== Arts ==
- George Edwards, born Ethan Kenning (born 1943), American singer with late 1960s psychedelic rock band H. P. Lovecraft
- George Edwards (actor) (1886–1953), Australian actor
- George Edwards (architect) (1854–1946), British architect
- George Edwards (producer) (1924–1991), American film producer and writer
- George Wharton Edwards (1859–1950), American impressionist painter and illustrator
- George Edwardes (1855–1915), né Edwards, English theatre manager and producer

== Politicians ==
- George Edwards (Australian politician) (1855–1911), member of the Australian House of Representatives
- Sir George Edwards (British politician) (1850–1933), English trade unionist and Labour MP for South Norfolk 1920–1922 and 1923–1924
- George C. Edwards (born 1948), member of the Maryland State Senate
- George H. Edwards (1860–1941), mayor of Kansas City, Missouri, 1916–1917

== Sports ==
- George Edwards (cricketer) (born 1992), English cricketer with Surrey County Cricket Club
- George Edwards (footballer, born 1918) (1918–1993), English striker for Aston Villa
- George Edwards (Welsh footballer) (1920–2008), Welsh international footballer
- George Edwards (American football) (born 1967), American football coach
- George Edwards, known as Big Bertha Edwards (fl. 1910s through 1950s), American football player and coach
- George R. Edwards (1890–1972), American football and basketball coach
- George Edwards (Australian footballer) (1927–1991), Australian rules footballer
- George Edwards (jockey) (1805–1851), English jockey

== Others ==
- Sir George Edwards (aviation) (1908–2003), British aviation designer and industrialist
- George W. Edwards (born 1939), sixteenth president of the Kansas City Southern Railway
- George Clifton Edwards Jr. (1914–1995), U.S. federal judge
- George Nelson Edwards (1830–1868), English writer and physician
- George Edwards (British Army officer) (1795–?), lieutenant assigned to the Brisbane Convict settlement in the 1830s
- George Edwards (around 1820), alleged government spy and agent provocateur in the Cato Street Conspiracy
- George Edwards (writer) (1752–1823), physician and writer
- George D. Edwards (1890–1974), first president of the American Society for Quality

== See also ==
- George Edwards Brown (1780–1848), British doctor and businessman, founder of the Chilean Edwards family
