= Valien =

Valien is a surname. Notable people with the surname include:

- Bonita H. Valien (1912–2011), African-American sociologist
- Preston Valien (1914–1995), African-American sociologist
