= Prairie View A&M University =

Historically black university in Prairie View, Texas, US

Coordinates: 30.09194°N 95.98944°W

- Former names: Alta Vista Agricultural and Mechanical College of Texas for Colored Youth (1876–1879); Prairie View State Normal School (1879–1899); Prairie View State Normal & Industrial College (1899–1945); Prairie View University (1945–1947); Prairie View A&M College of Texas (1947–1973)
- Motto: Prairie View Produces Productive People.
- Type: Public historically black land-grant university
- Established: 1876
- Parent institution: Texas A&M University System
- Academic affiliations: TMCF
- Endowment: $148.5 million
- President: Tomikia P. LeGrande
- Faculty: 486 full-time and 80 part-time
- Students: 10,085 (fall 2025)
- Location: Prairie View, Texas, U.S.
- Campus: Rural, 1,440 acres (5.8 km^{2})
- Colors: Purple and gold
- Nickname: Panthers & Lady Panthers
- Sporting affiliations: NCAA Division I – SWAC
- Mascot: Panther
- Website: pvamu.edu

Prairie View A&M University (PVAMU or PV) is a public historically black (HBCU) land-grant university in Prairie View, Texas, United States. Founded in 1876, it is the oldest public HBCU in Texas and the second oldest public institution of higher learning in the state. It offers baccalaureate degrees in 50 academic majors, 37 master's degrees and four doctoral degree programs through eight colleges and the School of Architecture. PVAMU is the largest HBCU in the state of Texas and the third largest HBCU in the United States. PVAMU is a member of the Texas A&M University System and Thurgood Marshall College Fund.

Prairie View A&M fields 18 intercollegiate sports teams, commonly known by their Prairie View A&M Panthers nickname. Prairie View A&M competes in National Collegiate Athletic Association (NCAA) Division I and the Southwestern Athletic Conference (SWAC). Prairie View A&M is the only charter member remaining in the conference.

== History ==
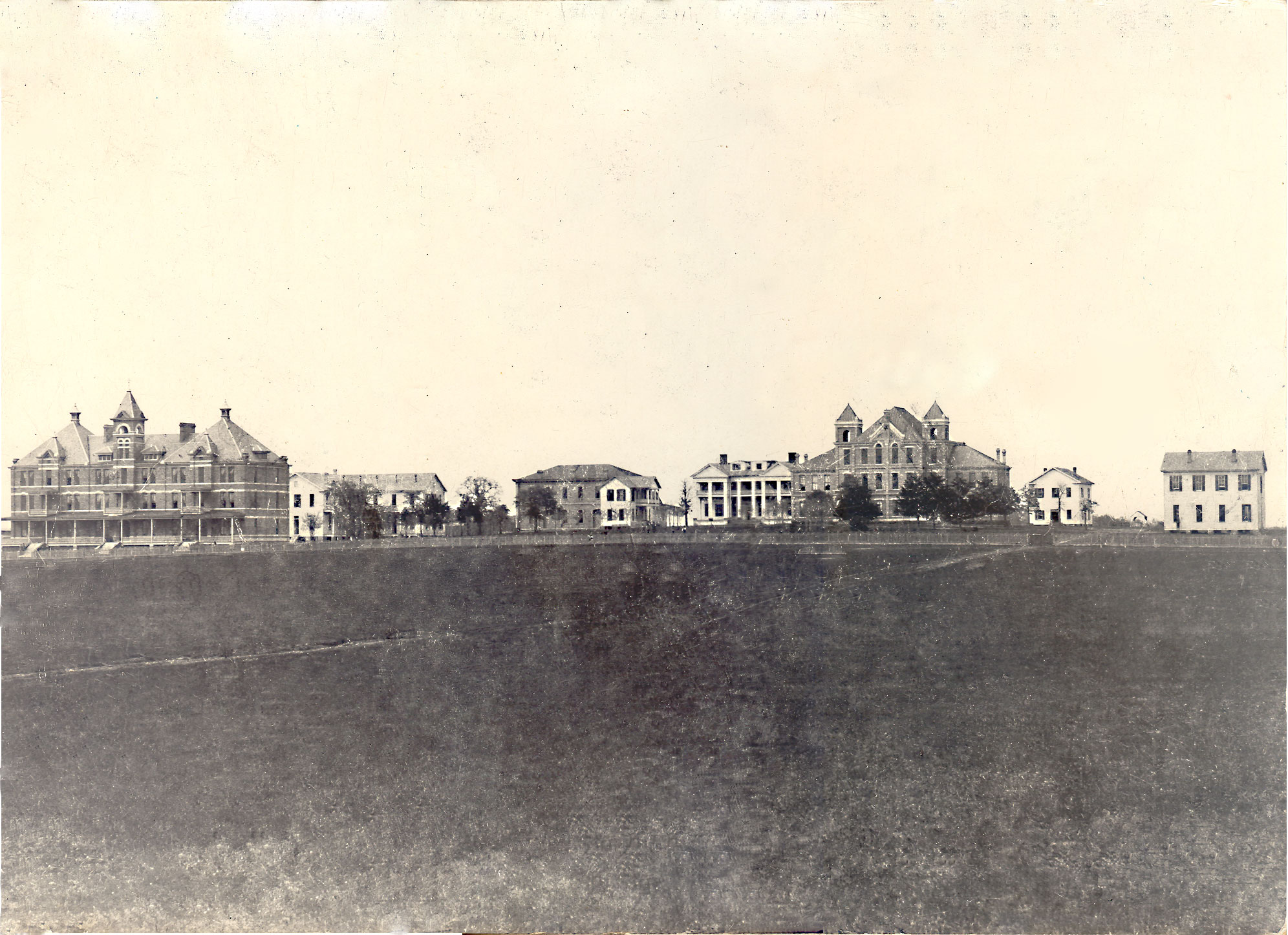
An early campus photo

The university was established as Alta Vista Agriculture & Mechanical College of Texas for Colored Youth The Sixteenth Legislature April 19, 1879 by Article 7 of the Texas Constitution of 1876, created near the end of the Reconstruction Era after the American Civil War. In that year, State Senator Matthew Gaines, State Senator Walter Moses Burton, and State Representative William H. Holland – all former slaves who became leading political figures – crafted legislation for the creation of a state-supported "Agricultural and Mechanical" college. In the article, the constitution stated that "Separate schools shall be provided for the white and colored children, and impartial provisions shall be made for both." The legislation made Prairie A&M the first state supported institution of higher learning for African Americans in Texas.

In an effort to comply with these constitutional provisions, the Fifteenth Texas Legislature, consistent with terms of the federal Morrill Land-Grant Colleges Act – which provided public lands for the establishment of colleges – authorized the "Alta Vista Agriculture and Mechanical College for the Benefit of Colored Youth" as part of the Agriculture and Mechanical College of Texas (now Texas A&M University). It was established on the former Alta Vista Plantation.

In 1945, the name of the institution was changed from Prairie View Normal and Industrial College to Prairie View University, and the school was authorized to offer, "as need arises," all courses offered at the University of Texas. In 1947, the Texas Legislature changed the name to Prairie View A&M College of Texas and provided that "courses be offered in agriculture, the mechanics arts, engineering, and the natural sciences connected therewith, together with any other courses authorized at Prairie View at the time of passage of this act, all of which shall be equivalent to those offered at the Agricultural and Mechanical College of Texas at Bryan." And finally in 1973, the legislature changed the name of the institution to Prairie View Agricultural & Mechanical University (Prairie View A&M University).

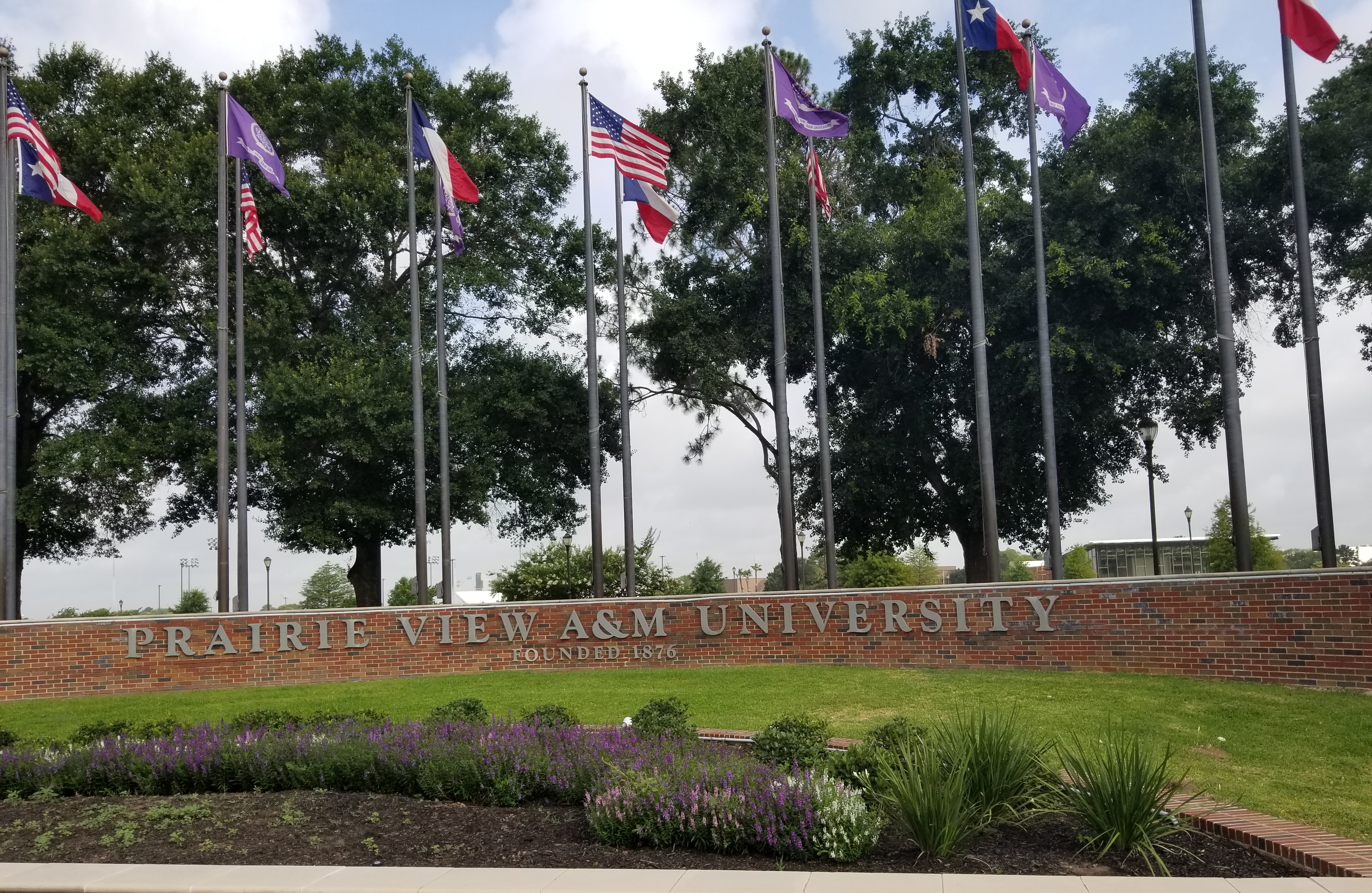
Entrance of campus

In 1983, the Texas Legislature proposed a constitutional amendment to restructure the Permanent University Fund (PUF) to include Prairie View A&M University as a beneficiary of its proceeds. The 1983 amendment also dedicated the university to more enhancements as an "institution of the first class" under the governing board of the Texas A&M University System. The constitutional amendment was approved by the voters on November 6, 1984.

In 2000, the Governor of Texas signed the Priority Plan, an agreement with the U.S. Department of Education Office of Civil Rights to establish Prairie View A&M University as an educational asset accessible by all Texans. The Priority Plan mandates creation of many new educational programs and facilities. It also requires removing language from the Institutional Mission Statement which might give the impression of excluding any Texan from attending Prairie View A&M University.

In December 2020, philanthropist MacKenzie Scott donated $50 million to Prairie View A&M which is the second largest single gift in its history.

In 2021, Prairie View A&M attained the R2 Carnegie Classification (Doctoral University; High Research Activity). Prairie View A&M is one of only 11 HBCUs to be granted R2 status and one of only four Texas A&M University System members in this category.

In November 2025, MacKenzie Scott donated an additional $63 million to Prairie View A&M which is the largest single gift in its history.

== Academics ==
Academic rankings

National
- U.S. News & World Report: 395-435
- Washington Monthly: 170
- WSJ/College Pulse: 372

Prairie View A&M University offers academic programs through the following administrative units:

- School of Architecture

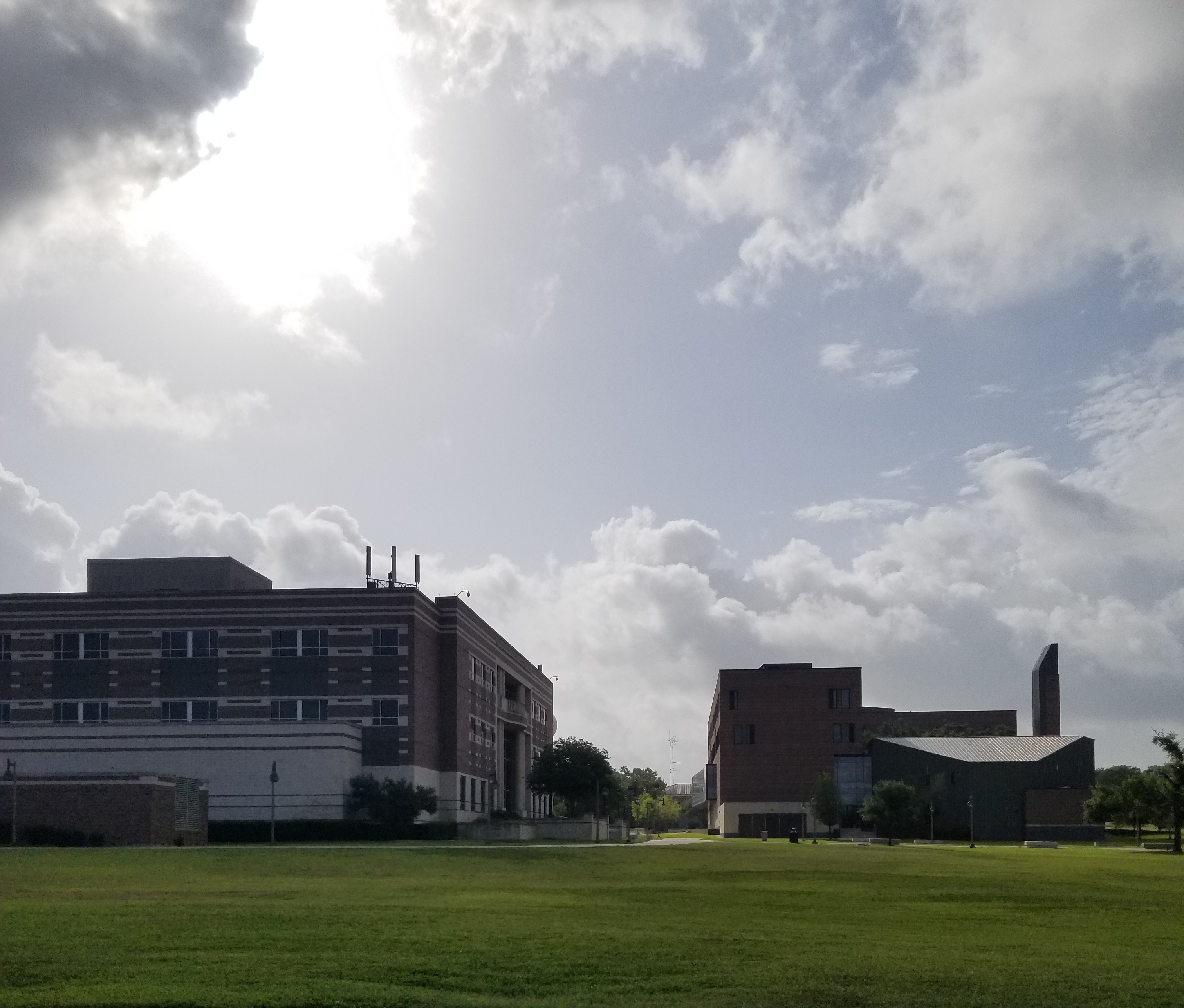
Don K. Clark building (left) and Agriculture & Business building (right)

- College of Agriculture and Human Sciences
- Marvin and June Brailsford College of Arts and Sciences
- College of Business
- Whitlow R. Green College of Education
- Roy G. Perry College of Engineering
- College of Juvenile Justice and Psychology
- College of Nursing
- School of Public and Allied Health
- Office of Graduate Studies

Prairie View A&M established the Texas Undergraduate Medical Academy (UMA) in 2004 which is a highly selective and rigorous pre-medical program designed to uniquely prepare academically talented undergraduates for success in medical, dental, pharmacy, or veterinary school. UMA began due to a Texas legislative mandate in 2003 and is state funded with a mission to increase minority representation in the medical field and redress statewide healthcare professional shortages.

Prairie View A&M established a highly selective honors program for academically exceptional undergraduates who meet the specified criteria.

Prairie View A&M is consistently recognized as one of the top institutions in the country for producing the highest number of African-American architects and engineers by Diverse Issues in Higher Education.

Prairie View A&M annually awards the second most STEM degrees in the Texas A&M University System.

Prairie View A&M academic programs are accredited by the Southern Association of Colleges and Schools Commission on Colleges and each college within the university holds additional accreditation or certifications.

For 2023, U.S. News & World Report ranked Prairie View A&M #331-440 in National Universities, #154 in Top Performers on Social Mobility (tie), #169-227 in Top Public Schools, #26 in Historically Black Colleges and Universities (tie), #196-212 in Best Undergraduate Engineering Programs, and #293 in Nursing.

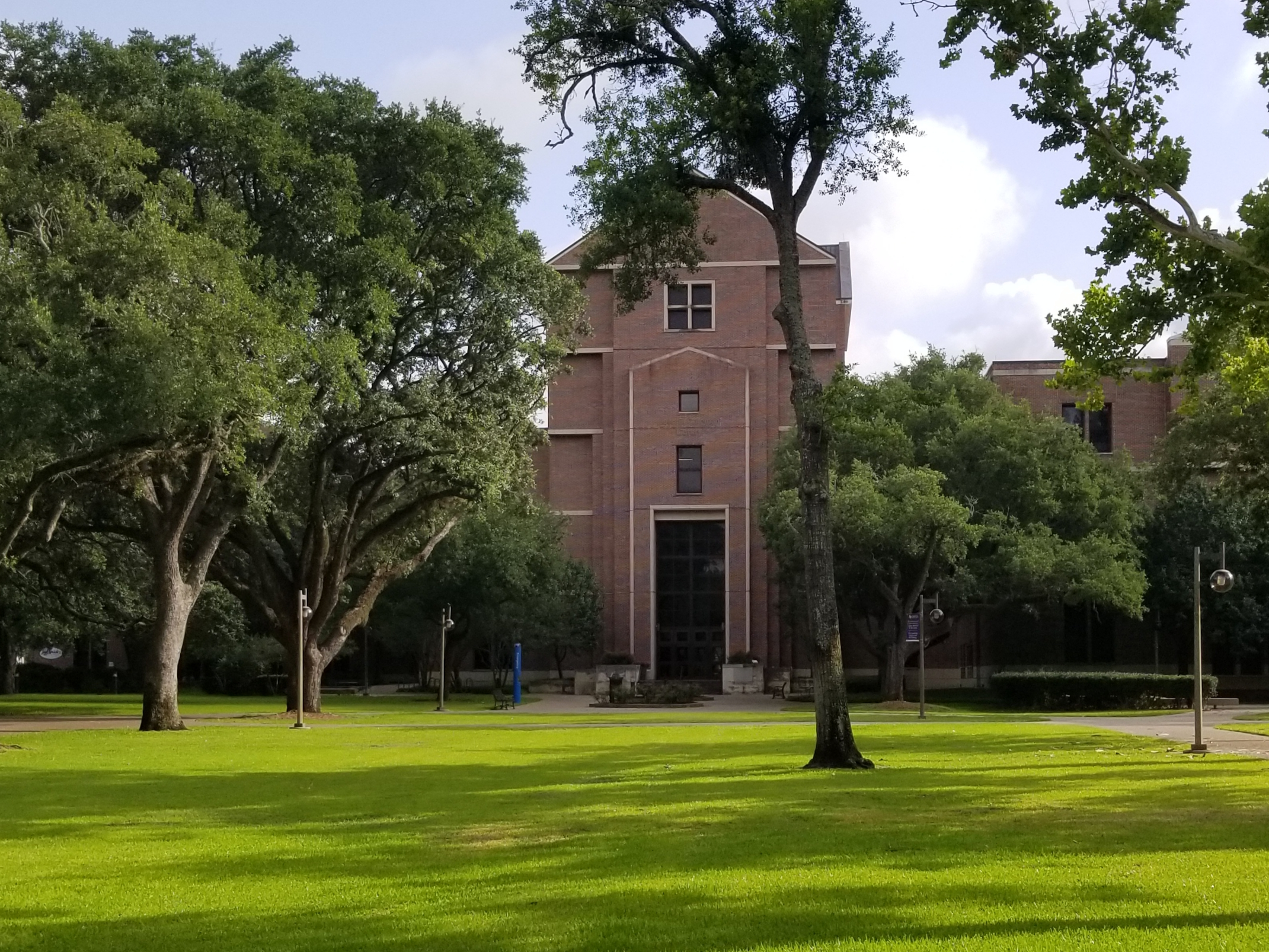
John B. Coleman Library

=== John B. Coleman Library ===
The John B. Coleman Library is the main library on campus. It is a five-story, 150,000 square foot building completed in 1988. The library provides several services to assist students and is home to over 370,000 Volumes, including over 700 print periodicals, and close to 4,000 media materials. The library is also home to an art gallery and a vast collection of historic and special archives.

== Campuses ==
Prairie View A&M has over 50 buildings on its 1,440-acre (5.8 km^{2}) main campus in Prairie View, Texas which is 48.8 miles (78.5 km) northwest of Downtown Houston. The campus is often referred to as "The Hill" because it rests on a hill in the region. The campus is also often described as one of the most beautiful in Texas.

Prairie View A&M has two smaller branch campuses in Houston with the Northwest Houston Center and the College of Nursing in the Texas Medical Center. The branch campuses offer several degree programs.

== Demographics ==
Undergraduate demographics as of Fall 2023
Race and ethnicity	Total
Black	85%
Hispanic	7%
Two or more races	3%
Asian	1%
International student	1%
Unknown	1%
White	1%
Economic diversity
Low-income (Note: The percentage of students who received an income-based federal Pell grant intended for low-income students.)	64%
Affluent (Note: The percentage of students who are a part of the American middle class at the bare minimum.)	36%

In spring 2022, the university enrolled 7,624 undergraduate students and 889 graduate students. 67% of students identify as female and 33% male. 88% of students are Texas residents. Outside Texas, the top three states of origin for students were California (131), Louisiana (130), and Illinois (62). Outside the U.S., the top three countries of origin for international students were Nigeria (62), Equatorial Guinea (25), and India (16).

== Student life ==
=== Housing ===
In 1998, American Campus Communities (ACC) was awarded the contract to develop, build, and manage a student housing property at PVAMU. Both student residence housing properties at PVAMU are owned and operated by ACC. Freshmen students on campus may reside in the University College community. Upperclassmen may live in apartment style living in University Village (phases I, II, III, VI, and VII). The first of these apartment buildings was built in 1995. The University Square, completed in October 2017, is the newest student housing facility on campus with 466 beds available for juniors, seniors, and graduate students.

About 50% of PVAMU undergraduate students live on campus.

Previous buildings that formerly housed students include Alexander Hall, Banks Hall, Buchanan Hall, Collins Hall, Drew Hall, L. O. Evans Hall, Fuller Hall, Holley Hall, and Suarez Hall. Suarez Hall was already closed in 1996. In 1997 Alexander Hall, Buchanan Hall, and Collins Hall had closed. In 1998 Holley Hall had closed. In 2000 Drew Hall, Evans Hall, and Fuller Hall had closed. During the same year, Alexander, Buchanan, and Holley had been demolished. In 2001 Banks Hall had closed.

=== Student organizations ===
PVAMU is home to over 150 honorary, professional, special interest, and Greek organizations established on campus. Since 1982, the Student Government Association (SGA) has been the highest ranking student organization on campus and official voice of the student body to the University Administration, as well as all internal and external organizations.

== Student activities ==
=== Athletics ===
Prairie View A&M University offers a wide variety of varsity and intramural sports programs.

Men's and women's athletic teams are nicknamed the Panthers and the team colors are purple and gold. Prairie View A&M is a charter member of the Southwestern Athletic Conference (SWAC), and is a member of the West Division. Prairie View competes in NCAA Division I in all varsity sports; in football, the Panthers play in the Division I FCS.

Prairie View's most notable rivals are Texas Southern University and Grambling State University.

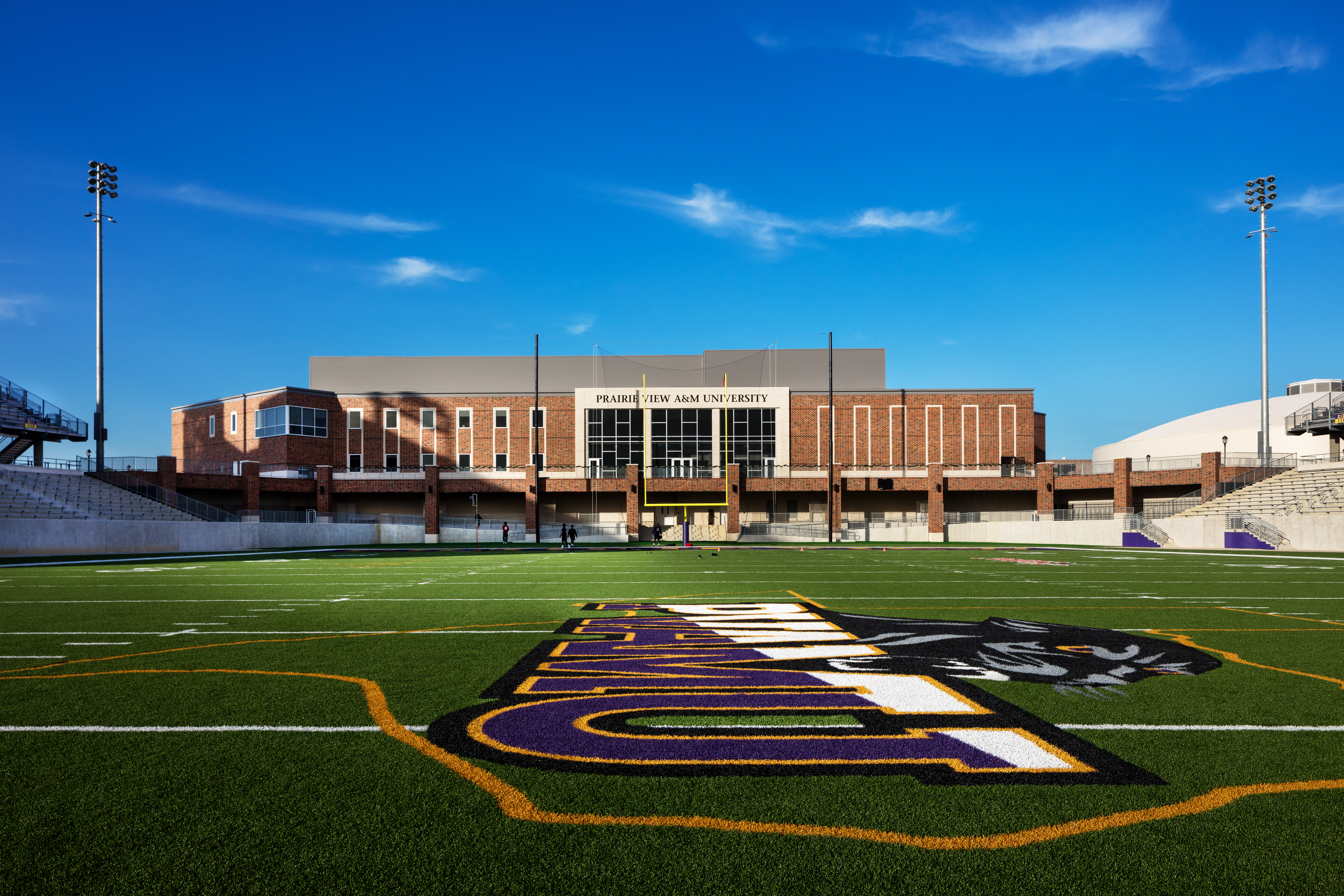
Panther Stadium at Blackshear Field

==== Football ====
In summer 2016, Prairie View A&M completed the first phase of construction on its $60 million football stadium and athletic field house. The state-of-the-art facility is 55,000 square feet and holds up to 15,000 people. The final phase of construction will increase capacity to 30,000 people. In fall 2018, Aaron "General" Walker donated $25 million to Panther stadium. A statue is soon to be built.

==== Men's basketball ====
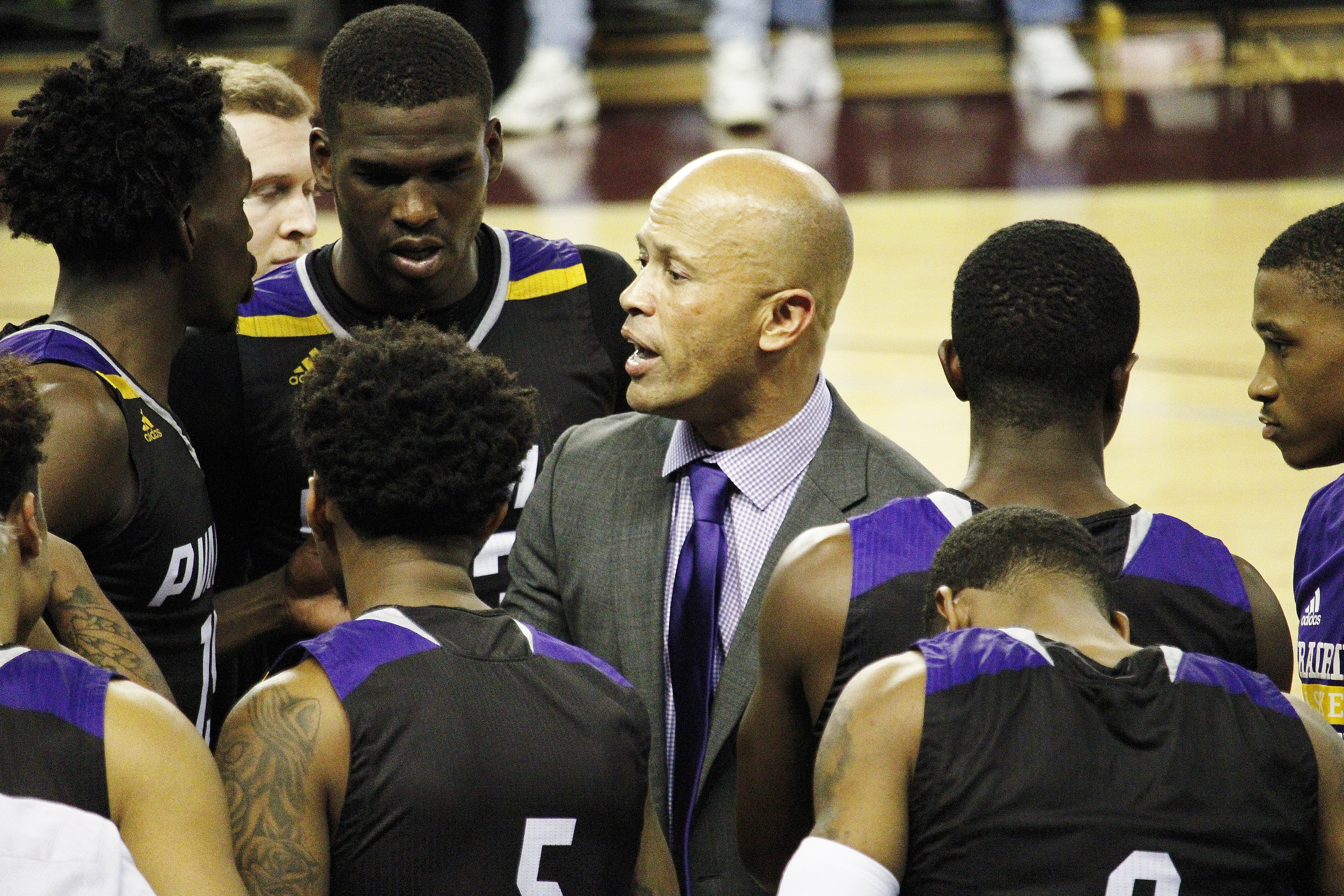
Byron Smith coaching the men's basketball team in 2020

All home basketball games are held in the William Nicks Building which was built in the early 1960s. The building has gone through several renovations since its inception and holds approximately 6,500 people.

==== Baseball ====
Prior to a double header against the Texas Southern Tigers, a ribbon cutting ceremony was held for the renovated baseball stadium on April 26, 2014. Along with the opening, the stadium was formally dedicated to former Panthers baseball coach, John W. Tankersley. The renovated stadium features seating for 512 including 192 chair backed seats, new concession stand, new restrooms, press box, and bricked dugouts. The stadium is also Wi-Fi enabled. The Panthers dedicated the stadium sweeping the double header winning 9–0 and 7–4.

=== Marching Storm ===
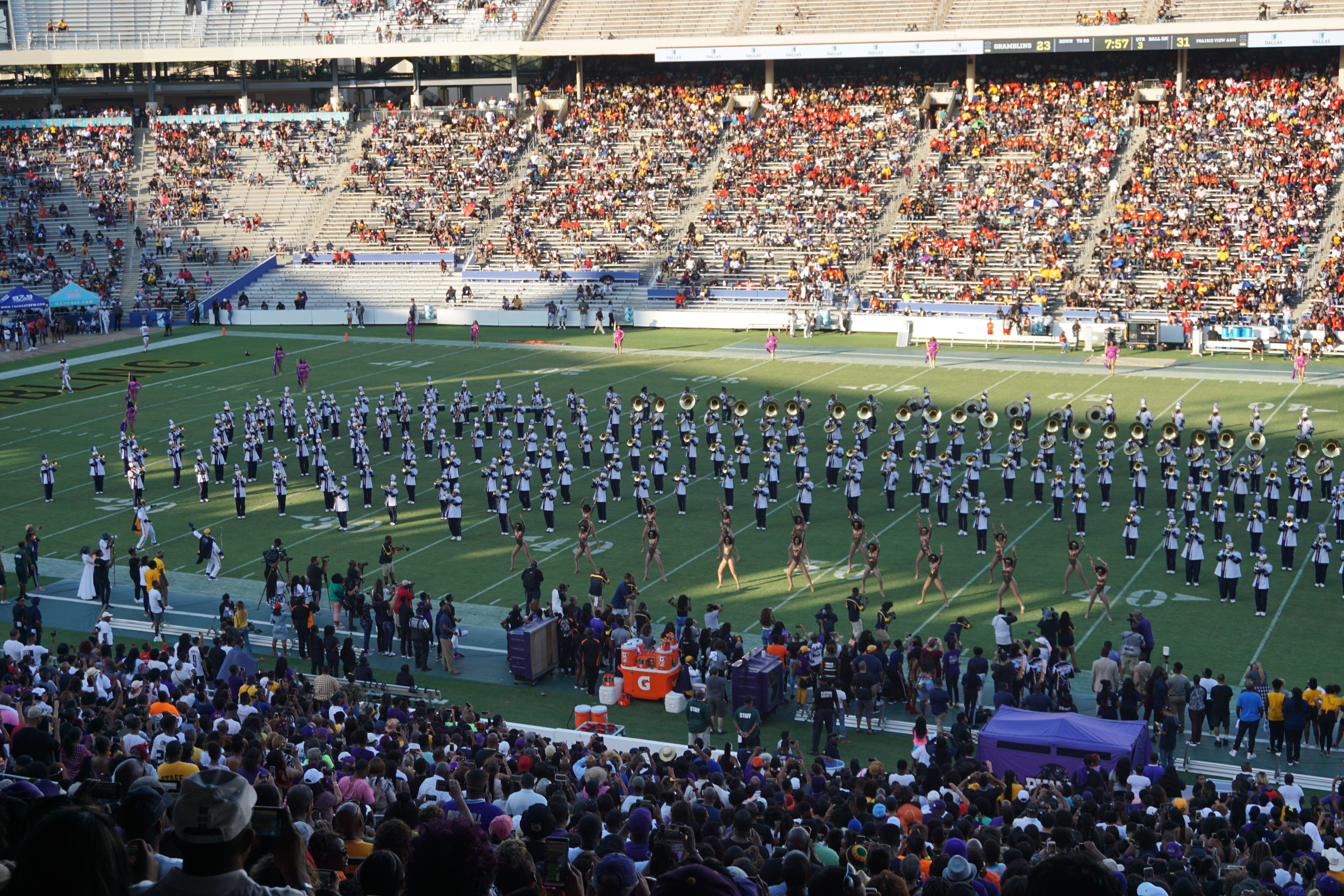
The Marching Storm performing during halftime of the 2019 State Fair Classic

Prairie View A&M's marching band is officially known as the Marching Storm and has close to 300 active members. Some of the band accomplishments include performing at the Super Bowl XLV halftime show, the Macy's Thanksgiving Day Parade, a U.S. presidential inauguration, the Tournament of Roses Parade, the Honda Battle of the Bands, the Houston Rodeo, the grand opening of the NRG Stadium, and at a 2004 Dallas Cowboys game with Destiny's Child. The band made an appearance on MTV in 2011. In 2022, the band starred in a TV docuseries entitled "March" on The CW Network. From 1984 to 2009 the marching band was directed by George Edwards.

==== Black Foxes ====
The Black Foxes are the 15–25 member women's danceline that accompanies the band.

==== Twirling Thunder ====
The Twirling Thunder are the 20-25 member women's color guard that performs with the band.

=== Prairie View Trail Ride Association ===
Every year since 1957, the Prairie View Trail Ride Association have done a trail ride from Hempstead, Texas, to Houston to attend the Houston Livestock Show and Rodeo. This ride contributes to keep alive the history and the continued existence of Black cowboys and cowgirls in Texas.

== Notable alumni ==
Name	Class year	Notability	Reference(s)
Tom Archia	1939	Jazz Tenor Saxophonist	
Lawrence Allen Jr.		Former member of the Texas State Board of Education (2005–2023)	
Hise Austin	1973	Former NFL defensive back	
Sebastian Barrie	1992	Former NFL defensive tackle	
Arthur Bryant	1931	Restaurateur. 2021 Inductee Barbecue Hall of Fame	
Clora Bryant		Jazz trumpeter	
Zelmo Beaty	1962	Professional and College Basketball Hall of Fame athlete who played in the NBA and ABA from 1962 to 1975	
Julius W. Becton, Jr.	1960	Lieutenant General US Army, Federal Emergency Management Agency Director, educator, and past president of PVAMU	
J. Don Boney	1948	First president of the University of Houston–Downtown	
Charlie Brackins	1955	One of the first African-American NFL quarterbacks	
Kirko Bangz (real name Kirk Randle)	Attended	Hip-Hop artist	
David L. Brewer III	1970	Retired vice admiral of the United States Navy and superintendent of the Los Angeles Unified School District (2006–2008)	
Charles Brown	1942	Blues recording artist and member of Rock & Roll Hall of Fame	
Emanuel Cleaver	1972	Member of the U.S. House of Representatives for the 5th district of Missouri since 2005	
Cecil Cooper	Attended	5-time MLB All-Star who played first base from 1971 to 1987, Houston Astros manager from 2007 to 2009	
Cynthia Cooper-Dyke	2005	Former WNBA player, Women's Basketball Hall of Fame inductee, published author, and Head Coach of the USC women's basketball team	
Clem Daniels	1959	Former NFL running back	
Bertha Des Verney		Musician and educator in Harlem	
Dorrough (real name Dorwin Demarcus Dorrough)	Attended	Rapper	
Terry Ellis	1990	Vocalist and member of female R&B group En Vogue	
Louis Edwin Fry Sr.	1922	Architect and professor; former Chair of the School of Architecture at Howard University	
Adrian Hamilton	2012	Linebacker for the Baltimore Ravens of the NFL since 2012	
Ken Houston	1966	Member Pro Football Hall of Fame, 13-year career as strong safety with Houston Oilers and Washington Redskins	
Louise Daniel Hutchinson		Historian	
Lenwood Johnson		Activist for the Fourth Ward, Houston and Allen Parkway Village	
Jim Kearney	1964	Defensive back in the NFL and AFL from 1965 to 1976	
Kase Lawal	1978	Chairman & CEO of Erin Energy Corporation	
Loni Love	1991	Comedienne, actress, and co-host and producer of The Real	
Jermaine McGhee	2007	Former NFL defensive end	
Sidney A. McPhee	1976	President of Middle Tennessee State University	
E. Walter Miles	1955	Political scientist and constitutional law scholar	
Jim Mitchell	1968	Former NFL tight end	
Thomas Monroe		1990 AFL Ironman of the Year	
Frederick D. Patterson		Founder of United Negro College Fund	
Ervin Perry	1956	First African American faculty member at University of Texas at Austin and at a predominantly white university in the South	
DJ Premier (real name Christopher Edward Martin)	Attended	Member of Gang Starr	
Inez Beverly Prosser	1913	First African-American woman to receive a doctoral degree in psychology	
Dewey Redman		Jazz saxophonist	
Alvin Reed	1966	Former NFL tight end	
Amber Chardae Robinson	2012	actress	
Clay Smothers		Member of the Texas House of Representatives from Dallas County from 1977 to 1981; operator of St. Paul Industrial Training School in Malakoff, Texas	
James H. Stewart		Member of the Texas House of Representatives from Robertson County from 1885 to 1887	
Mr. T (real name Laurence Tureaud)	Attended	Actor who played B. A. Baracus in The A-Team	
Otis Taylor		Former NFL wide receiver and member of 1969 World Champion Kansas City Chiefs Hall of Fame	
Bonita H. Valien		Sociologist at Fisk University, author of books about school desegregation	
Preston Valien		Sociologist at Fisk University and Brooklyn College; cultural attache in Nigeria	
Calvin Waller	1959	U.S. Army General and Deputy Commander-in-Chief in the Persian Gulf War	
Craig Washington	1966	Member of the U.S. House of Representatives for the 18th district of Texas from 1989 to 1994	
Craig Watkins	1990	District attorney of Dallas County, Texas since 2007	
Mark Hanna Watkins	1926	Linguist and anthropologist; first African-American to be awarded a Ph.D. in anthropology; first American to write a grammar of an African language	
Dave Webster	1959	Former American Football League All-Pro football player for the Dallas Texans/Kansas City Chiefs, Prairie View A&M University Hall of Fame inductee and one of the first blacks to play professional football in the American Football League.	
Arthuryne J. Welch-Taylor	1937	education professor at several HBCUs, researcher with the National Education Foundation	
James E. White	1986	Former member of the Texas House of Representatives from Tyler County	
Clarence Williams	1968	Former NFL defensive end	
Donnie Williams		American football player	

== See also ==
- Ruth Simmons, first black president of an Ivy League institution and the first woman president of Prairie View A&M
- Flossie M. Byrd, first Provost and Vice President for Academic Affairs at Prairie View A&M
- KPVU 91.3 FM Radio, Prairie View A&M radio station
- Clarence F. Stephens, one of the first African Americans to earn a PhD in mathematics and professor at Prairie View A&M
- History of African Americans in Houston
