= Walter Miles =

Walter Miles may refer to:

- Walter Richard Miles, American psychologist
- E. Walter Miles, American political scientist and scholar of constitutional law
