= Camac =

Camac or CAMAC may refer to:

- CAMAC Energy, United States-based oil and gas company
- Camac Street, Kolkata, India
- Computer Automated Measurement and Control, a computer bus standard for particle detectors
- River Camac, Dublin, Ireland
- Robert W. Camac (1940–2001), American racehorse trainer
