= Arthuryne J. Welch-Taylor =

American educator (1917–2022)

- Arthuryne Welch, from a 1955 newspaper profile
- Born: Arthuryne Andrews; March 11, 1917; Houston, Texas, U.S.
- Died: May 12, 2022; Howard County, Maryland, U.S.
- Occupation(s): College professor, educator
- Relatives: Richard Allen (great-grandfather)

Arthuryne Julia Andrews Welch-Taylor (March 11, 1917 – May 12, 2022) was an American educator. She taught at several HBCUs from the 1930s to the 1980s, culminating as a professor at the University of the District of Columbia, and a researcher with the National Education Foundation.

== Early life and education ==
Arthuryne Andrews was born in Houston, Texas, one of the six children of Richard Taylor Andrews and Julia Augusta Somerville Andrews. Her father was a Baptist minister who was inducted into the Indianapolis Civil and Human Rights Hall of Fame. Her great-grandfather was Richard Allen, the first Black member of the Texas House of Representatives.

In 1937, she earned a bachelor's degree in home economics from Prairie View A&M University, where she was also the first Miss Prairie View. She also had a business administration degree from Langston University. In widowhood she returned to school, and completed a master's degree in education at Tennessee State University in 1953, with a dissertation titled "A Survey of the Organization, Administration, and Function of Placement Bureaus in Institutions of Higher Education", and a PhD from George Peabody College (now part of Vanderbilt University). Her 1960 doctoral dissertation was titled "Suggestions for Improving Professional Laboratory Experiences of Elementary Education Majors at Tennessee Agricultural and Industrial State University".

== Career ==
Welch-Taylor was a home demonstration agent in Texas after college. She began her academic career as assistant to the president of Langston University in Oklahoma. She was assistant director of the placement bureau at Tennessee State University in the 1940s. She became a professor of education at Tennessee State University. She held visiting professor appointments at Texas Southern University and Prairie View A&M. In 1969, she became an associate professor at Washington Technical Institute, which became the University of the District of Columbia. She retired from a research position with the National Education Association in 1986. In 2010 she and her sister appeared in a documentary, Speak Now: Private Voices & Public History, about the alumni of Prairie View A&M University.

She was a member of several national Black women's organizations, including Alpha Kappa Alpha, Chums, Inc. and Jack and Jill.

== Personal life ==
She married James A. Welch in 1941, in Dallas; he died in a bus accident in 1949, while she was pregnant with their fourth child. She married a second time in 1969, to Henry L. Taylor, an educator and civil rights coordinator in the US Department of Agriculture. He died in 1987.

Welch-Taylor died at a hospital in Howard County, Maryland on May 12, 2022, at the age of 105.
