= Kase Lukman Lawal =

Nigerian-born US businessman (born 1954)

Kase Lawal
- Born: Kase Lukman Lawal; June 30, 1954 (age 72); Ibadan, Nigeria
- Occupation: Corporate Executive
- Years active: 1976 - Present
- Known for: CEO of Erin Energy Corporation

Kase Lukman Lawal (born June 30, 1954) is a Nigerian-born businessman who lives and works in the United States.

Lawal was born June 30, 1954, in Ibadan. He obtained his Bachelor of Science in chemistry from Texas Southern University in 1976, and his MBA from Prairie View A&M University, both in Texas in 1978. He is the chairman and chief executive officer of CAMAC International Corporation, chairman and chief executive officer of Erin Energy Corporation, and chairman of Allied Energy Corporation in Houston, Texas, Chairman/Chief Executive Officer, CAMAC HOLDINGS; vice chairman, Port of Houston Authority Commission. He also serves as a member of the board of directors and is a significant shareholder in Unity National Bank, the only federally insured and licensed African-American-owned bank in Texas. Lawal was a member of the National Republican Congressional Committee's Business Advisory Council and, in 1994, he was a finalist for the United States Business Entrepreneur of the Year. Lawal is a member of Phi Beta Sigma fraternity. He was awarded an honorary doctorate degree in philosophy from Fort Valley State University.

== Career summary ==
- Shell Oil Refining Company, 1975–1977, process engineer
- Dresser Industries, 1977–1979, research chemist
- Suncrest Investment Corporation, 1980–1982, vice president
- Baker Investments, 1982–1986, president
- CAMAC Holdings, 1986–, chief executive officer and president
- Port of Houston Authority Board of Commissioners, 1999–2000, commissioner 2000–, vice chairman
- Allied Energy Corporation, 1991–, chairman.

== Awards ==
- USAfrica Business Person of the Year, USAfrica The Newspaper, 1997.
