= Fulham Town Hall =

Municipal building in London, England

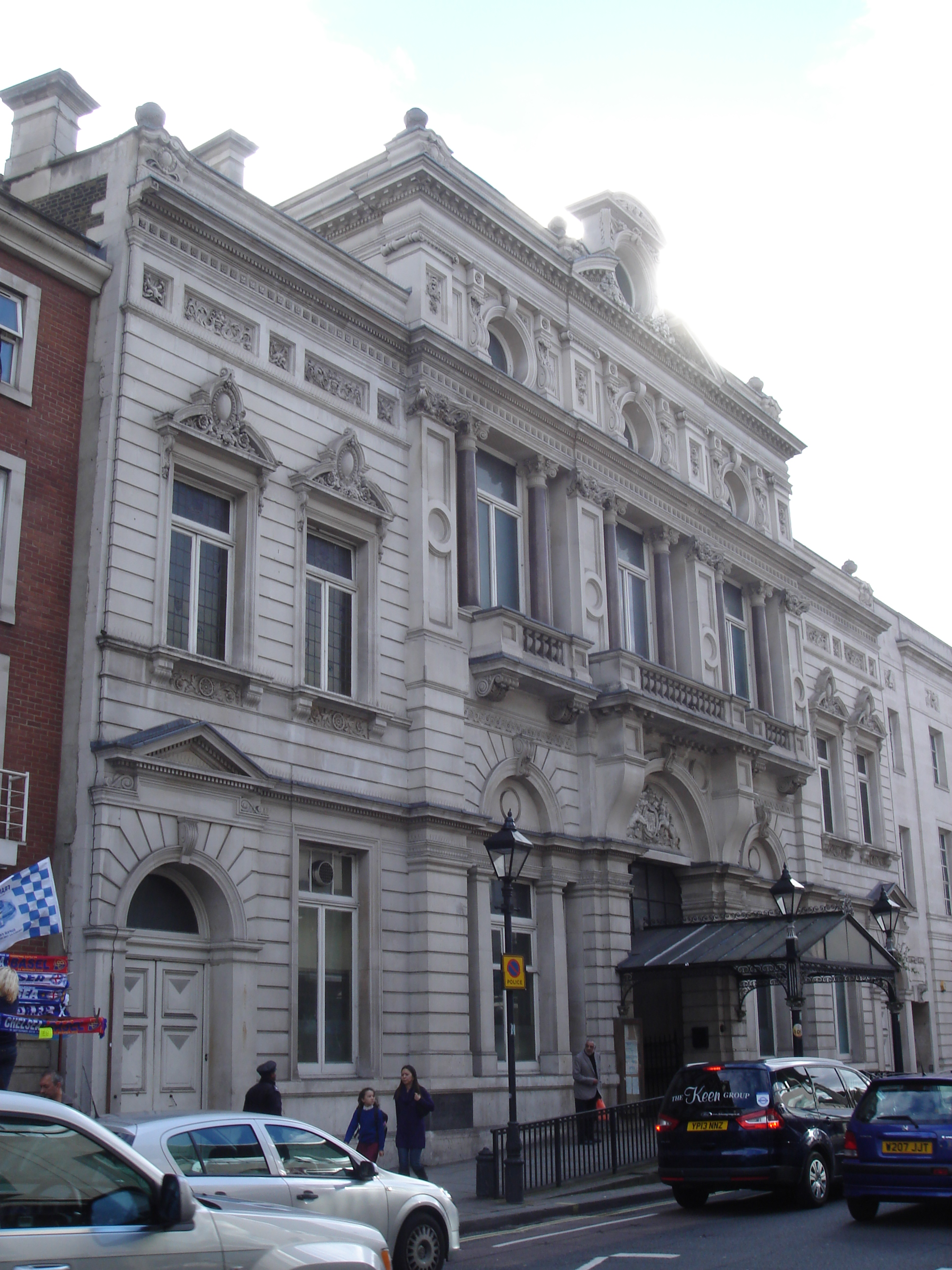
- Fulham Town Hall

- Shown in Hammersmith and Fulham
- 51.4798°N 0.1947°W
- Location: Fulham

History
- Built: 1890

Site notes
- Architect: George Edwards
- Architectural style: Classical style

Listed Building – Grade II*
- Designated: 31 July 1981
- Reference no.: 1191939

Fulham Town Hall is a municipal building on Fulham Road, Fulham, London. It is a Grade II* listed building.

== History ==
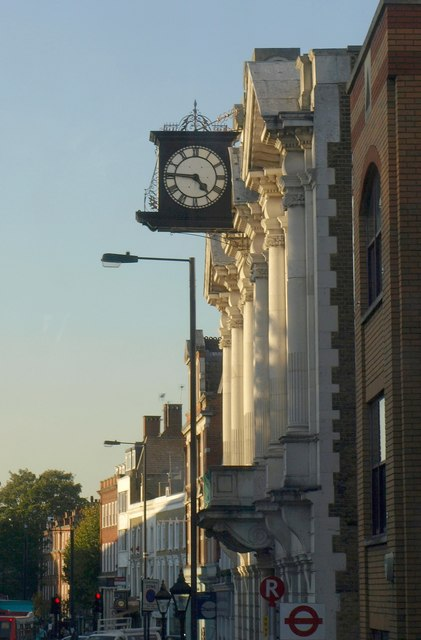
Clock above the Harwood Road entrance.

The building was commissioned by the Parish of St John to replace an existing vestry hall in Walham Green. The site chosen had previously been occupied by a property known as Elton Villa. In the villa's grounds there had been a mulberry tree, which had been planted by Nell Gwyn or her lover; it was chopped down and made into walking sticks in order to make way for the new vestry hall.

The foundation stone for the new building was laid on 10 December 1888. It was designed by George Edwards in the classical style, constructed by Treasure & Son, and completed in 1890. The design involved a symmetrical main frontage with seven bays facing onto Fulham Road; the central section of three bays featured an arched doorway with carved tympanum above flanked by windows; there were three windows each flanked by Ionic order columns on the first floor; there were three ocululi on the second floor and a lucarne with another oculus above. Internally, the principal room was a large public hall, often referred to as the Great Hall, which extended deep into the building on the first floor. An additional block was built to the south east of the main building with a council chamber on the ground floor and a concert hall on the first floor.

After the Metropolitan Borough of Fulham was established in 1900, it was decided to extend the building to the south west along Harwood Road to the designs of Francis Wood, the borough engineer. The extension included a mayor's parlour on the ground floor and some committee rooms on the first floor; the enlarged complex was officially opened by the mayor, William Sayer, as the new Fulham Town Hall, on 3 November 1905. The new façade to Harwood Road included a large drum clock, manufactured by Potts of Leeds and mounted high above the entrance (the mechanism would be replaced by a Gents' Pulsynetic electric clock in 1933). A portrait of King George V by Richard Jack was hung in the council chamber in 1926.

The building was extended again, this time to the west along Fulham Road, in 1934 to accommodate the local registrar's office. A large stained glass window, depicting Earconwald, who served as Bishop of London in the 7th century, was designed by Francis Spear and made by Lowndes & Drury; it installed at the head of the stairs leading to the Great Hall in the 1930s.

The town hall continued to serve as the headquarters of the Metropolitan Borough of Fulham for much of the 20th century but ceased to be the local seat of government when the enlarged London Borough of Hammersmith and Fulham was formed in 1965. It was subsequently used as an administration centre and events venue.

In February 2019, the London Borough of Hammersmith and Fulham sold the building to a private developer, Ziser London, who announced plans to convert the facility into a hotel, restaurants, event space and spa.
