= Prince of Teck, Earl's Court =

Pub in Earls Court, London

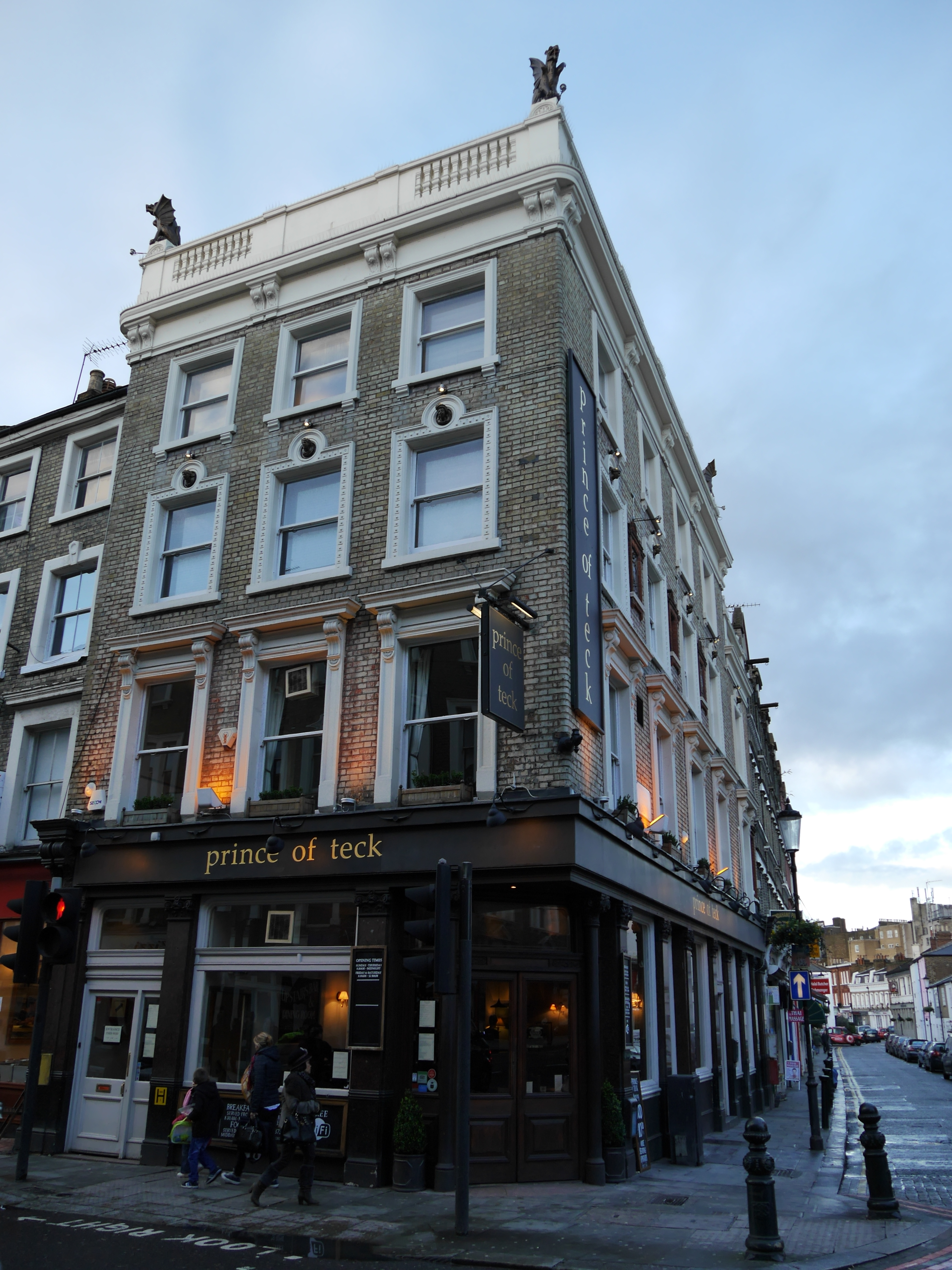
- Prince of Teck, Earls Court

- Location within Royal Borough of Kensington and Chelsea Location within Greater London

General information
- Location: 161 Earls Court Road, London, England
- Coordinates: 51°29′34″N 0°11′38″W

Design and construction
- Designations

Listed Building – Grade II
- Official name: Prince of Teck Public House
- Designated: 21 October 1997
- Reference no.: 1031501

The Prince of Teck is a Grade II listed public house at 161 Earls Court Road, Earls Court, London. It was named after Francis, Duke of Teck, a German nobleman who became connected to the British royal family after marrying Princess Mary Adelaide of Cambridge.

It was constructed in 1868 for the Child family, by the builders Huggett and Hussey (Thomas Huggett and Thomas Hussey). It was altered from 1879 to 1881, and the balustrading, stone wyverns and busts are by George Edwards, the "favourite architect" of the publican and developer Alfred Savigear.
