= George Edwards (architect) =

British architect

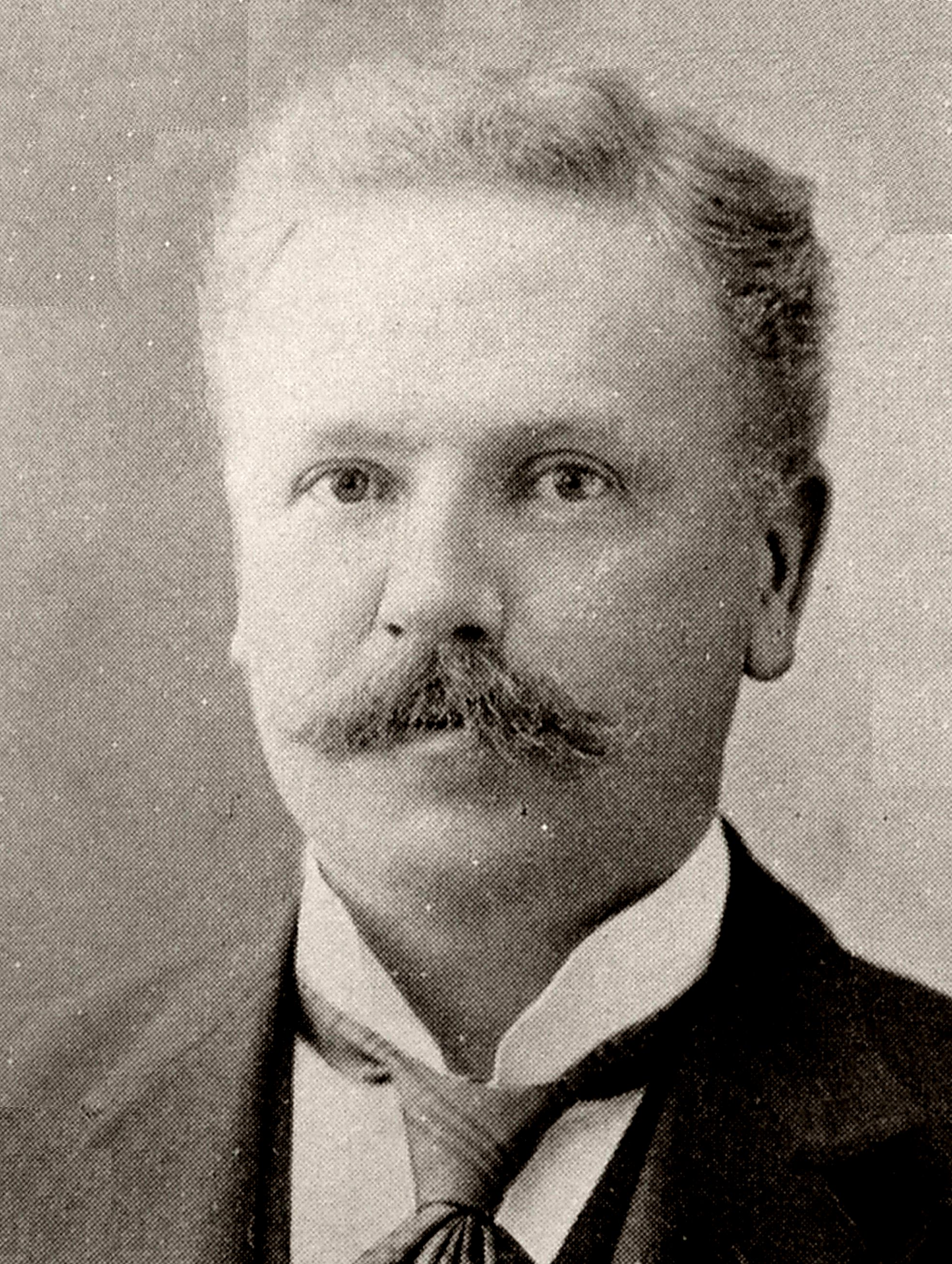
George Edwards, in 1905

George Edwards JP (2 November 1854 – 3 March 1946) was a British architect, best known for his 1888–90 Fulham Town Hall, now a Grade II* listed building.

== Career ==
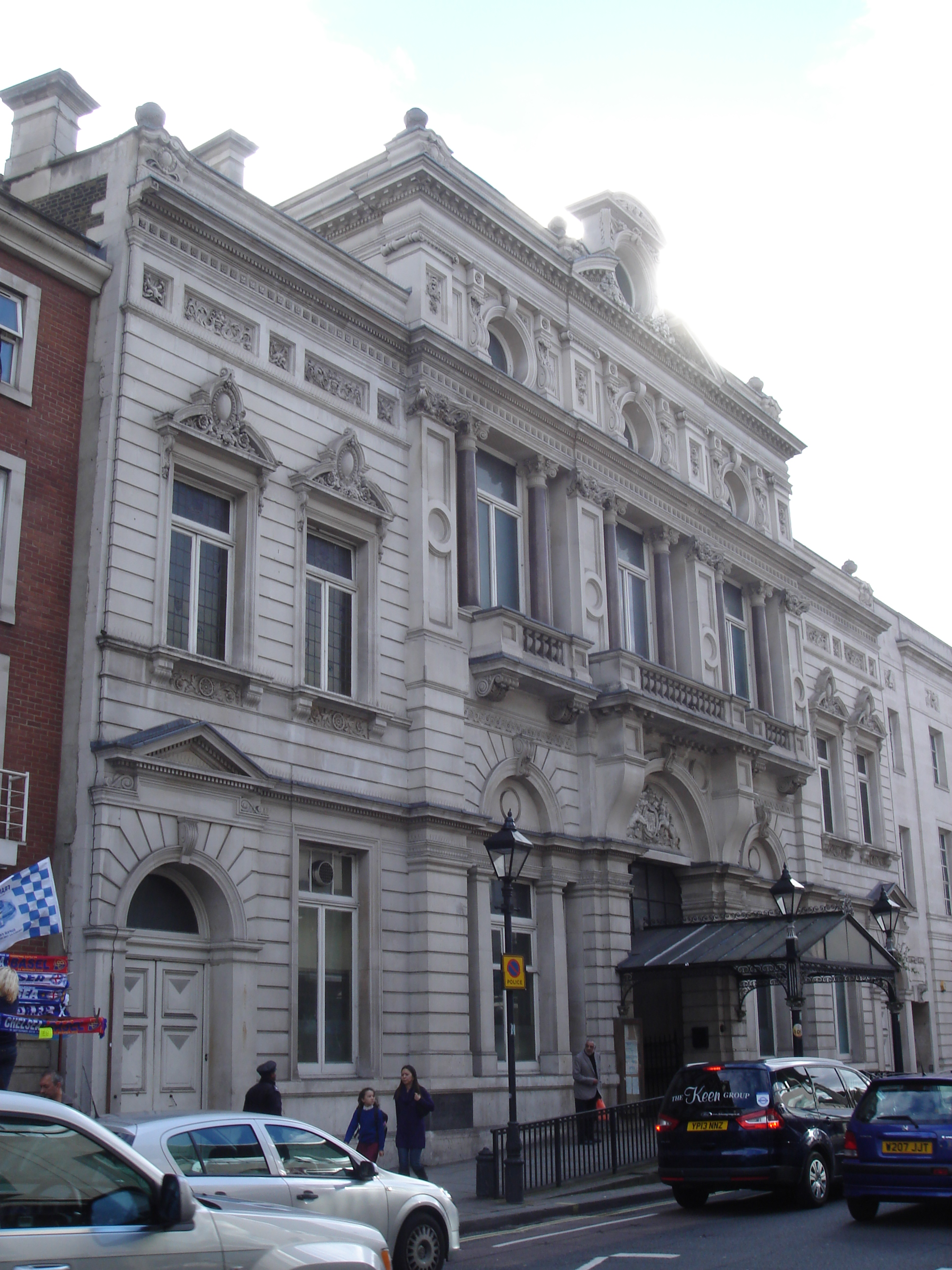
Fulham Town Hall

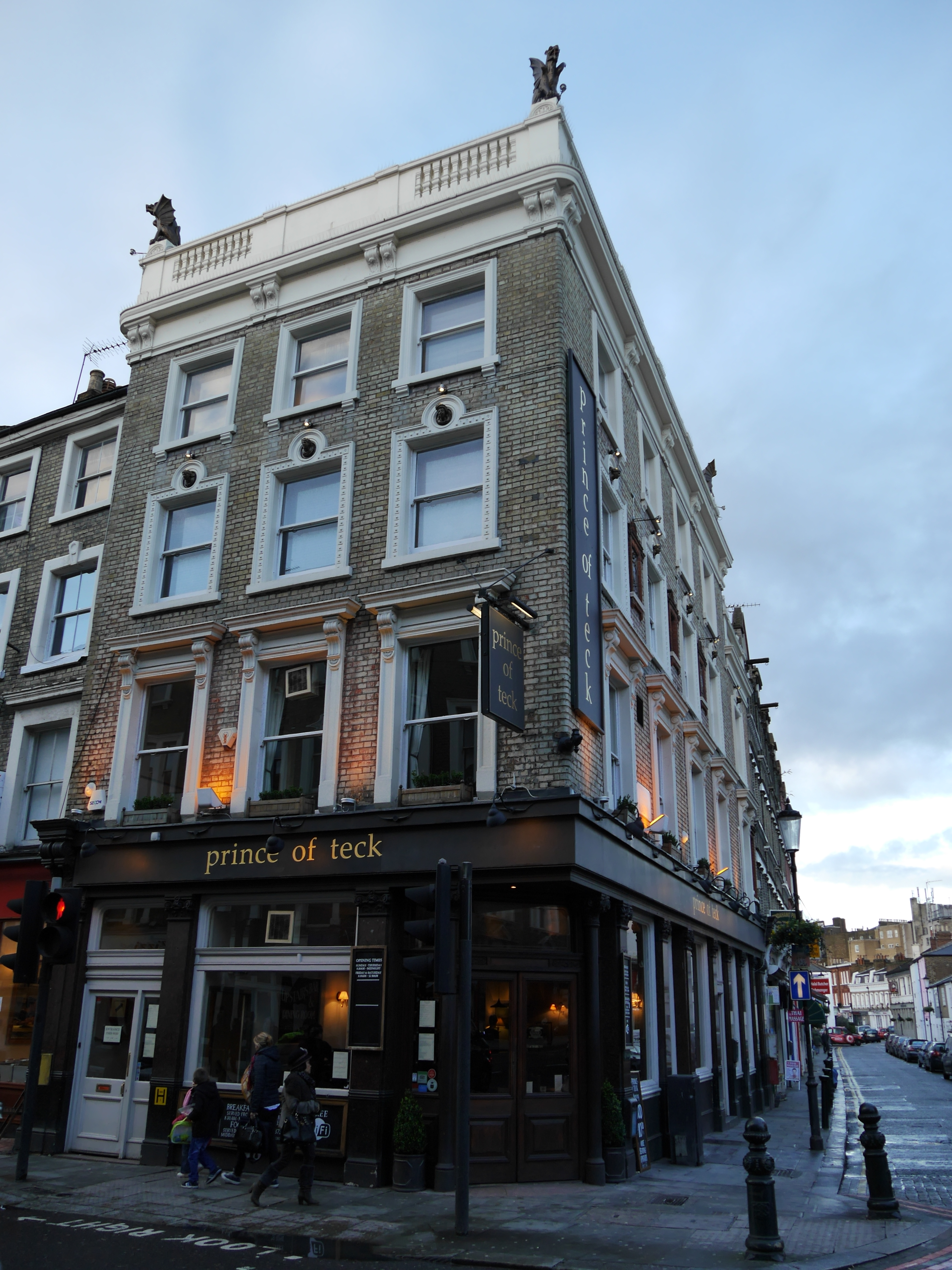
The Prince of Teck, Earls Court

Edwards was the "favourite architect" of the publican and developer Alfred Savigear, who employed him in Earl's Court on building houses in Hogarth Place and Kenway Road, and 1879-81 alterations to his pub there, The Prince of Teck, including the balustrading, stone wyverns and busts.

Fulham Town Hall, a Grade II* listed building on Fulham Road, Fulham, London, was built in about 1888–90 to the designs of Edwards, and altered and extended in 1904–05 to the design of Francis Wood, the borough engineer.
