= George Edwards (writer) =

George Edwards (1752 – 17 February 1823) was a Scottish medical doctor and writer.

== Life ==
Edwards took his degree at the University of Edinburgh in 1772, and appears to have practised as a physician in London, and latterly at Barnard Castle, Durham. He was an untiring propounder of political and social schemes between 1779 and 1819. It does not appear that Edwards attracted any attention, and he may not have been entirely sane. He died in London on 17 February 1823, aged 77.

== Works ==
The British Museum contained 42 of his books; the following titles are representative: 'A certain Way to save our Country, and make us a more happy and flourishing people than at any former period of our history ' (1807); 'The Practical System of Human Economy, or the New Era at length fully ascertained, whereby we are able in one immediate, simple undertaking to remove the distress, burdens, and grievances of the times, and to bring all our interests, public, private, and commercial, to their intended perfection' (1816).

Edwards's writings abound in the unconscious humor of the egotist deeply persuaded of his mission. He gives notice that 'the Almighty has destined that I should discover his true system of human economy.' In a petition to the House of Commons (1816?), he prays that the house should carry out the schemes which were the fruits of 'almost half a century's attention.' Among his proposals were the removal of taxes hurtful to industry, economy, and reduction of public expenditure, the sale of certain national properties, particularly Gibraltar, the extension of the income tax to all orders, and forbearance for any requisite period to pay off the national debt as 'altogether superfluous with the accession of the new and happy era of mankind.' Government boards were to superintend all the interests of mankind, and everybody was to be actuated by truly Christian principles.

He published an address 'aux citoyens Français sur la Nouvelle Constitution,' and 'Idées pour former une Nouvelle Constitution, et pour assurer la prospérité et le bonheur de la France et d'autres nations' (Paris, 1793).
