= George Edwards (British Army officer) =

British army officer (1795–18??)

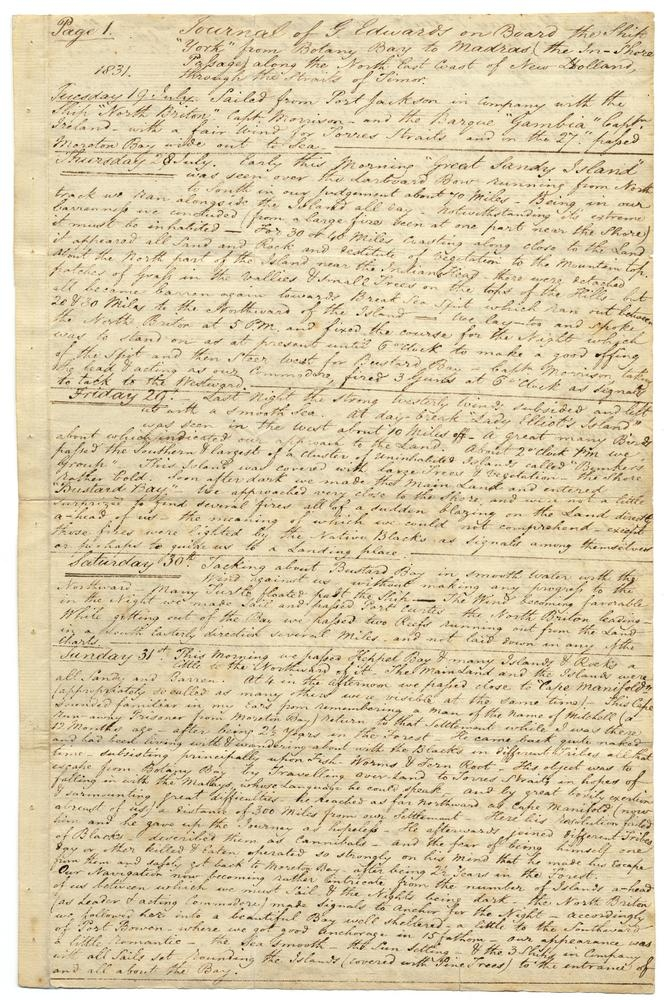
George Edward's Journal

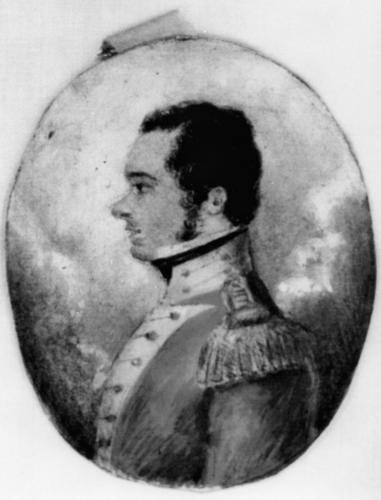
Portrait of George Edwards

George Edwards was a Lieutenant with the 57th Regiment, assigned to the Brisbane Convict settlement in the 1830s. Edwards was born in Hastings, Sussex, England, on 2 February 1795. He joined the British Army, at the age of 24, as an Ensign. In January 1827, Edwards sailed on the convict ship Asia, from Deptford to Sydney, commanding a detachment of 1 sergeant, I corporal and 16 soldiers as guards of the convicts. In October of the same year, Edwards was promoted to Lieutenant, before the ship docked in Sydney in March 1828.

In October 1828, Edwards was posted to the Moreton Bay penal settlement. Following the death of Captain Patrick Logan (the Moreton Bay Commandant) Edwards took over the responsibility of the Department of Works at Moreton Bay from the in-coming Commandant James Clunie. It was Edwards who made the official report of Logan's death to his Commanding Officer Lieutenant-Colonel Allan in Sydney. The manuscript copy of this letter is contained in Patrick Logan's letterbook, and is held at the State Library of Queensland, Brisbane, Australia.

The Library also holds a small collection of items belonging to Edwards – his telescope and badge of the 57th Regiment, a diary he kept on the York between 19 July 1831 and 24 August 1831, and some small portraits.

Mt Edwards was originally named Mt Banister by John Oxley in 1824. It was renamed in 1828 by Allan Cunningham, in honour of Lieutenant George Edwards. It was gazetted in Moogerah Peaks National Park in 1966.
