= George Nelson Edwards =

English writer and physician (1830–1868)

George Nelson Edwards, M.D. (1830–1868) was an English writer and physician.

== Life ==
Edwards was the son of a surgeon, was born at Eye, Suffolk, in 1830, and received his school education in part at the grammar school of Yarmouth, and in part at that of Beccles. He obtained one of the studentships in medicine endowed by Tancred, a Yorkshire squire, at Gonville and Caius College, Cambridge, where he graduated M.B. in 1851, and after studying at St. Bartholomew's Hospital, London, obtained the license in medicine then given by the university of Cambridge in 1854, and became M.D. in 1859.

He was elected assistant-physician to St. Bartholomew's Hospital in 1860, was secretary to the medical council of the hospital from 14 January 1865 to 9 February 1867, and was in 1866 elected lecturer on forensic medicine in the medical school. He also held the office of medical registrar, and was elected physician to the hospital 23 January 1867, but did not long enjoy that office. One day, while going round the wards, he fell down in an uræmic convulsion, was moved to his own house, a victim of chronic Bright's disease. He grew blind so gradually that he did not know when he had totally ceased to see. A physician who had been at Caius College with him used constantly to visit him, and one day found him sitting before a window through which a bright sun was shining on his face. 'Please draw up the blind,' said Edwards, unconscious that the atrophy of his optic discs was complete.

He died 6 December 1868.

== Works ==
He edited the first three volumes of the 'St. Bartholomew's Hospital Reports,' 1865–7, and published in 1862 'The Examination of the Chest in a Series of Tables.' He described (St, Bartholomew's Hospital Reports, i. 141 ) two cases of poisoning by mercuric methide, the symptoms of 'which were then new to medicine, and also wrote a paper 'On the Value of Palpation in the Diagnosis of Tubercular Disease of the Lungs' (ib. ii. 216).
