= Bonita H. Valien =

African-American sociologist

- Born: Bonita Harrison; 1912; Fort Worth, Texas, U.S.
- Died: 2011 (aged 98–99)
- Education: Prairie View A&M University; Clark Atlanta University; University of Wisconsin
- Occupation: Sociologist
- Spouse: Preston Valien

Bonita H. Valien (1912–2011) was an African-American sociologist. She was an associate professor of sociology at Fisk University, a historically black university in Nashville, Tennessee, and the author of several books about desegregation in the Southern United States.

== Early life ==
Bonita Valien was born as Bonita Harrison in 1912 in Fort Worth, Texas. She graduated from Prairie View A&M University, where she earned a bachelor's degree. She subsequently earned a master's degree from Clark Atlanta University, and a PhD from the University of Wisconsin.

== Career ==
Valien worked at Fisk University in the 1940s and 1950s. She worked as a research assistant for Charles S. Johnson, Fisk University's first African American president. By 1957, she was associate professor of sociology.

Valien became the only African American to conduct research on school desegregation for the Southern Education Reporting Service, a project co-founded by Johnson and Harvie Branscomb, the chancellor of Vanderbilt University. She was "continually shortchanged of salary, resources, and responsibilities" throughout her employment. She was eventually dismissed from her position after she criticized the way some school districts were responding to Brown v. Board of Education.

Valien authored books about desegregation in St. Louis, Missouri, Clinton, Tennessee and Cairo, Illinois. With her husband, she published research about the Montgomery bus boycott and interviews with civil rights movement leader Martin Luther King Jr.

== Personal life and death ==
Valien married Dr. Preston Valien, the chair of the Sociology department at Fisk University.

Valien died in 2011.

== Selected works ==
- Valien, Bonita H. (1953). A Study of the Integration of the Public Schools of Cairo, Illinois. Nashville, Tennessee. OCLC 31312137.
- Valien, Bonita H. (1956). The St. Louis Story: A Study of Desegregation. New York City: Anti-Defamation League of B'nai B'rith. OCLC 4122351.
