= Preston Valien =

Sociologist

- Born: February 19, 1914; Beaumont, Texas, U.S.
- Died: 1995 (aged 80–81)
- Education: Prairie View A&M University; University of Wisconsin
- Occupation: Sociologist
- Spouse: Bonita H. Valien

Preston Valien (February 19, 1914 - 1995) was an African-American sociologist. He was a Sociology professor at Fisk University and Brooklyn College, and he worked for the U.S. federal government, including as a cultural attaché in Nigeria. He was the author of several books about school desegregation in the Southern United States.

== Early life ==
Valien was born on February 19, 1914, in Beaumont, Texas. He graduated from Prairie View A&M University, where he earned a bachelor's degree. He subsequently earned a PhD from the University of Wisconsin.

== Career ==
Valien became a Sociology professor at Fisk University, a historically black university in Nashville, Tennessee. He served as the head of its Sociology department until 1960, when he resigned to work as a cultural attaché at the Embassy of the United States in Nigeria for the United States Information Agency until 1962.

Valien was an associate professor of Anthropology and Sociology at Brooklyn College from 1962 to 1965. He later served as chief of graduate programs for the U.S. Office of Education. He was the commencement speaker at Alcorn State University in 1975.

Valien author of several books about school desegregation in the Southern United States. With his wife, he interviewed Civil Rights leaders Martin Luther King Jr. and Rosa Parks.

== Personal life ==
Valien married Bonita Harrison, a sociologist. He died in 1995.

== Selected works ==
- Masuoka, Jitsuichi; Valien, Preston, eds. (1975). Race Relations: Problems and Theory: Essays in Honor of Robert Ezra Park. Freeport, New York: Books for Libraries Press. OCLC 476442564.
