= George Edwards (marching band director) =

George W. Edwards (November 5, 1948 – May 28, 2009) was the director of bands for Prairie View A&M University.

== Early life and education ==
Edwards was born in Chattanooga, Tennessee, on November 5, 1948, to George and Beulah Edwards. He was baptized at Second Missionary Baptist church by Rev Paul A. McDaniels and served faithfully until leaving to attend Florida A&M University, (FAMU) Tallahassee, Florida. He earned his Bachelor of Arts in Music (1970) and he joined Kappa Kappa Psi band fraternity (1969), and Alpha Phi Alpha fraternity, Beta Nu chapter. While at FAMU, he played as part of famed Marching 100, performing under the pioneering and legendary Dr. William P. Foster, where he received a number of distinctive awards and opportunities; some of which were his selection as Student Arranger, the Outstanding Senior Award, and having his arrangements played by the Marching 100 at Super Bowl III.

In the mid-1970s, he directed the jazz band at Kirkman Technical High School in his hometown of Chattanooga, where he frequently arranged popular pieces for his students. Mr. Edwards later received a master's in music education from Michigan State University (1976). At Michigan, many of his marching band arrangements were performed and recorded by the Michigan State University Spartan Marching Band. From 1975 to 1978 he traveled with Lansing Community College Suitcase Theater as Musical Director, touring the Netherlands, Germany, Wales, Scotland, Denmark, Belgium, and Japan. On January 1, 2009, George Edwards led the "Storm" in the 120th Tournament of Roses Association Rose Parade in Pasadena, CA where they were the first Black College Band to perform in the Rose Bowl's Parade pilot program to include bands from historically black colleges and universities (HBCUs) in the parade each year.

== Prairie View A&M University ==
In 1978, Prof. Edwards came to Prairie View A&M University (PVAMU) as Assistant Director of Bands and served in capacity of music arranger. In 1984, Edwards rose to the position of Head Director of the Prairie View A&M University Marching Band and Jazz Band. Professor Edwards took the struggling marching band of 25 and helped them become a world-renowned, first-class composition of musical athletes. Under his leadership, in 1991 the band rebranded as “The Marching Storm" due in part to a slew of challenging or canceled performances due to weather. His technique and passion for the art of marching band was characterized by his quest for perfection, and the motto that the band came to live by was: “Make It Happen!”

Through Professor Edwards' direction, the Marching Storm became the first marching band to debut its drumline solely during the "drum feature", known as the PV McFunk BOX (The BOX, for short), in a show-style halftime event at the football games. Edwards incorporated few of the FAMU concepts of innovative formations and fast-stepping, while adding unique framing, drum routines, and their majorettes (the Black Foxes), to create a half-time show that provided the "Marching Storm" with national recognition and their pick of the best of the best high school band members from across the nation.

For 30 years Professor Edwards collaborated with friend and associate, Dr. Margaret Sherrod on music arranged especially for the jazz and precision high kick choreography of the “Black Foxes” majorette line that he always urged to live up to their reputation as a “Class Act.” Skyrocketing to national acclaim, the Storm performed, appeared, or were featured as part of the following activities:

- 2001: Performed in President George W. Bush's Inaugural Parade in Washington, D.C.
- 2004: The Marching Storm Band and the Black Foxes were featured in the Black College Band Exhibition, "And the Band Played On," which was seen by more than 30,000 at the Dallas Museum of African-American History
- 2004: The PVAMU Drum Line, "The Box" and the "Black Foxes," were featured performers with Beyoncé at the Dallas Cowboys' Thanksgiving Day game
- 2004–2007: Featured in the Dallas Weekly; Urban Sports News
- 2004: Featured on numerous occasions in The Dallas Morning News
- 2005: Featured in British Broadcasting New Radio Special, "Marching All Together"
- 2005: Featured in The Times
- 2006: The band performed at the Essence Music Festival in Houston
- 2006: Invited to perform at the Macy's Thanksgiving Day Parade (a lifelong goal of Professor Edwards), but were unable to raise the $400,000 necessary for the trip to New York City
- 2007: Featured article and video in the New York Times
- 2008: "The Box" was flown to Los Angeles for a command performance for executives from Honda and The Tournament of Roses Parade
- 2008: The Marching Storm Band and the Black Foxes performed at the Texas A&M University-University of Miami football game at Kyle Field in College Station and received overwhelming accolades from ESPN television commentators
- 2009: George Edwards led the "Storm" in the 120th Tournament of Roses Association Rose Parade in Pasadena, CA where they were the first Black College Band to perform in the Rose Bowl's Parade pilot program to include bands from historically black colleges and universities (HBCUs) in the parade each year

Professor Edwards has received countless awards for his outstanding work in the field of music, the most remarkable being a Senate Resolution from the Texas State Legislative presented in Senate Chambers by Sponsors, State Senator, Rodney Ellis, and state Representative Garrett Coleman.

== Death ==
In May 2009, George died from sustained injuries following a car crash in Houston, Texas. He was 60 years old.

== Legacy ==
Professor Edwards was an innovator who was dedicated, committed, and passionate about music and its performance. Professor Edwards spoke in a language that only band members understood; with words like:

“Chop chop Chief” "Chatter, chatter!" “What’s up Chief” “Drop down and give me twenty” “I know you don’t have a doo rag on your head” “Get on the Bus” “In the Hole Band…last time” “Chief, pull your pants up” “Do you see this knucklehead”

Prof. Edwards spawned numerous band directors from his lineage of marching band leadership and style.
