= E. Walter Miles =

American political scientist (1934–2020)

- Born: May 4, 1934; Hearne, Texas
- Died: July 8, 2020 (aged 86); San Diego
- Education: Prairie View A&M University; Indiana University Bloomington
- Scientific career
- Fields: Political science; Constitutional law
- Workplaces: Prairie View A&M University; University of North Carolina; San Diego State University

Elijah Walter Miles (usually published as E. Walter Miles; May 4, 1934 – July 8, 2020) was an American political scientist and scholar of constitutional law. He specialized in the Constitution of the United States and the judicial process. He spent more than 30 years at San Diego State University, where he served as head of the political science department. When he joined that faculty, he was the only Black professor at San Diego State University. The university librarian Robert Fikes, Jr. termed Miles "the Godfather of Black Faculty" at SDSU, and he was noted for his activism as well as his academic contributions.

== Early life and education ==
Miles was born on May 4, 1934, in Hearne, Texas. He had 7 siblings. He graduated from Blackshear High School in 1951. He then attended Prairie View A&M University, where he graduated with a bachelor's degree in 1955. He then spent two years as an officer in the United States Army, and he served in Korea. After his time in Korea he attended Indiana University Bloomington for graduate school, earning a master's degree in government, followed by a PhD in government which he completed in 1962. During his graduate studies, Miles was one of the main activists in the movement to desegregate public venues in Bloomington, Indiana.

== Career ==
After completing his PhD in government at Indiana University in 1962, Miles returned to Prairie View A&M University, where he lectured for three years. He continued to work as an activist, and led a boycott of racially discriminatory businesses in Hempstead, Texas. He then moved to the University of North Carolina. There he was involved in an effort to improve off-campus housing. In 1966 or 1967, Miles joined the faculty of San Diego State University, where he remained for more than 30 years. At the time that he joined SDSU, Miles was the only Black faculty member there.

Miles's research focused on the constitution of the United States, the United States Supreme Court, and the American judicial process. He was one of the authors of the 1989 edition of Vital Issues of the Constitution, which was re-published several times. Miles also contributed analyses of cases on slavery, voting rights, and free expression to the collection Great Cases of the Supreme Court.

Miles edited a number of political science journals, and he chaired the American Political Science Association Committee on the Status of Blacks in the Profession, as well as being a member of the APSA's governing board. Miles was also involved in activism and community service outside of academia, including being the chair of the San Diego Urban League board, chair of the San Diego chapter of the American Civil Liberties Union and a member of its national board, and an appointed member of the California State Board of Education. He also engaged in public scholarship, for example participating in a televised debate with Clarence M. Pendleton Jr. on the topic of affirmative action. He was active as an activist for the hiring of African American academics, and coauthored a prominent report on the topic at SDSU.

In the university librarian Robert Fikes, Jr.'s 2019 book The Black in Crimson and Black: A History and Profiles of African Americans at SDSU, Fikes termed Miles "The Godfather of Black Faculty" at SDSU.

Miles retired in 1998, and he died on July 8, 2020.
