= National Education Foundation =

National Education Foundation (بنیاد قومی تعلیمی) is an autonomous body responsible for the provision of basic education and literacy to the children. It was established in 1994 by the Government of Pakistan.
