= Erin Energy Corporation =

United States based oil and gas company

Erin Energy Corporation (Expert Market: ERINQ) is a United States based company involved in exploration, development and production of oil and gas. It was formerly known as CAMAC Energy. Its principal assets are in Africa comprising nine licenses across 4 countries, with current production and exploratory projects offshore of Nigeria, as well as exploration licenses offshore of Ghana, Kenya, and Gambia, and onshore in Kenya. In addition, through its Pacific Asia Petroleum subsidiaries, it has operations in China.

== Corporate ==
The Chairman and CEO is African-American businessman, Kase Lukman Lawal. John Hofmeister, former president of Shell Oil Company, is on the board and will become the Chairman in 2016.

It was founded in 2005 as CAMAC Energy and has offices in Houston, Texas, Beijing, China, and Lagos, Nigeria.

== Ownership ==
Erin Energy was listed on the NYSE Amex Equities until 2018 when it moved its stock to the OTC Markets Group.

== Operations ==
On 4 August 2014 the company announced it had discovered 4 new oil and gas reservoirs in its Oyo-8 development well located offshore Nigeria. Erin had already drilled Oyo-7 in October 2013. The company said in its 4 August 2014 statement it was one step closer to bringing the two wells into production.

In July 2018, it was announced that Erin Energy went into liquidation.
