= Scourfield =

Scourfield is a surname. Notable people with the name include:

- D. J. Scourfield (1866–1949), British civil servant and biologist
- Tommy Scourfield (1909–1976), Welsh rugby player
- John Scourfield (1808–1876), Welsh politician in the House of Commons
- William Henry Scourfield (1776-1843), British politician and landowner
- Gris Davies-Scourfield (1918–2006), British Army officer and World War II prisoner of war
