= Scourfield baronets =

Extinct baronetcy in the Baronetage of the United Kingdom

The Scourfield baronetcy, of The Mote and of Williamston, both in the County of Pembroke, was a title in the Baronetage of the United Kingdom. It was created on 18 February 1876 for John Scourfield, Member of Parliament for Haverfordwest and Pembrokeshire and Lord Lieutenant of Pembrokeshire from 1868. The 2nd Baronet was High Sheriff of Pembrokeshire in 1881. The title became extinct on the death of the 2nd Baronet in 1921.

== Scourfield baronets, of the Mote and Williamston (1876) ==
- Sir John Henry Scourfield, 1st Baronet (1808–1876)
- Sir Owen Henry Philipps Scourfield, 2nd Baronet (1847–1921)

Baronetage of the United Kingdom
Preceded by Barttelot baronets	Scourfield baronets of the Mote and Williamston; 18 February 1876	Succeeded by Gilpin baronets
