= Bletherston =

Village and parish in Pembrokeshire, Wales

Coordinates: 51°52′0″N 4°47′39″W

Bletherston: Welsh: Trefelen
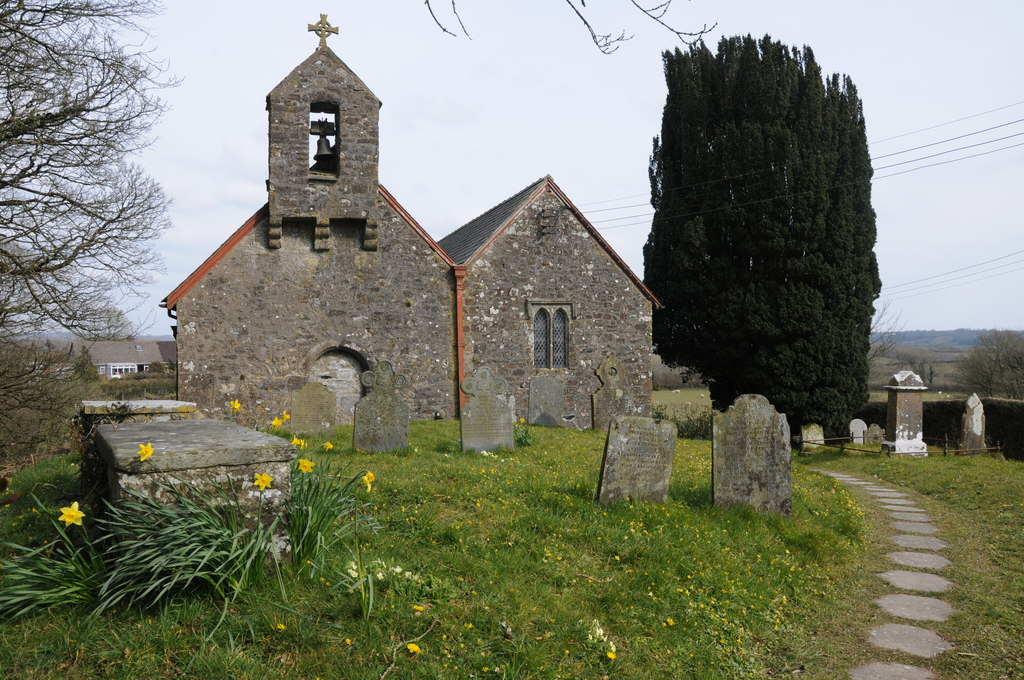
- St Mary's Church, Bletherston

- Location within Pembrokeshire
- Community: New Moat
- Principal area: Pembrokeshire
- Country: Wales
- Sovereign state: United Kingdom
- Police: Dyfed-Powys
- Fire: Mid and West Wales
- Ambulance: Welsh
- UK Parliament: Preseli Pembrokeshire
- Senedd Cymru – Welsh Parliament: Preseli Pembrokeshire

Bletherston (Welsh: Trefelen) is a small settlement and parish in Pembrokeshire, Wales. It is in the middle of eastern Pembrokeshire, 6 miles (9.7 km) north of Narberth and 8 miles (13 km) northeast of Haverfordwest. The parish includes the village of Penffordd. Together with the parishes of Llys y Fran and New Moat, it constitutes the community of New Moat.

== Name ==
The English placename appears to mean Bleddri's farm: Bleddri is a Welsh name. The Welsh placename Trefelen means "yellow farm".

== Parish history ==
The church of St Mary, in the centre of the village, is a grade II* listed building, parts of which may be 12th century, but have been added to or altered since.

The parish, which was noted on a map of 1583, is in the north-west portion of the hundred of Dungleddy which George Owen in 1602 placed south of the Pembrokeshire language frontier. However, as part of the church lands to the north of the Afon Syfynwy, Owen said it was bilingual, and in modern times it has been predominantly Welsh-speaking. The percentage of Welsh language speakers was 97 (1891): 85 (1931): 50 (1971).

The parish had an area of 970 Ha.

According to Lewis's Topographical dictionary of 1844, the population was 371. Its census populations were: 235 (1801): 320 (1851): 235 (1901): 132 (1951): 84 (1981).
