= Rhys Morgan (disambiguation) =

Rhys Morgan is an activist.

Rhys Morgan may also refer to:

- Rhys Morgan (cricketer), New Zealand cricketer
- Rhys Morgan (rugby union)
- Rice Morgan, MP, also spelt Rhys Morgan

== See also ==
- Morgan Rhys (disambiguation)
- Morgan (disambiguation)
- Rhys
