= Eleanor Needham =

Eleanor Needham may refer to:

- Eleanor Needham (17th century), mistress of James Scott, 1st Duke of Monmouth and daughter of Robert Needham
- Eleanor Needham (17th century), wife of English MP Robert Needham
- Ellen Needham (1834–1900), Anglo-Irish author and artist
