= 1873 Haverfordwest Boroughs by-election =

UK Parliamentary by-election

The 1873 Haverfordwest Boroughs by-election was fought on 24 November 1873. The by-election was fought due to the incumbent Liberal Party MP, The Lord Kensington taking the position of Parliamentary Groom in Waiting. It was retained by Edwardes.

1873 Haverfordwest by-election
| Party | Candidate | Votes | % | ±% |
|---|---|---|---|---|
| Liberal | William Edwardes | 609 | 52.2 | −4.0 |
| Conservative | Xavier de Castanos Royds Peel | 558 | 47.8 | +4.0 |
| Majority | | 51 | 4.4 | −8.0 |
| Turnout | | 1,167 | 73.3 | −1.1 |
| Registered electors | | 1,592 | | |
| Liberal hold | | Swing | -4.0 | |
