= 1874 Haverfordwest by-election =

UK Parliamentary by-election

The 1874 Haverfordwest by-election was fought on 12 June 1874. The by-election was fought due to the voiding of the election of the incumbent Liberal MP, The Lord Kensington. It was retained by the incumbent who ran unopposed.

== Results ==
1874 Haverfordwest by-election
Party	Candidate	Votes	%	±%
Liberal	The Lord Kensington	Unopposed		
Registered electors		1,357		
Liberal hold				

== See also ==
- Lists of United Kingdom by-elections
