= William Wogan (politician) =

Sir William Wogan KS (c. 1638 – 1 December 1708) was a Welsh judge and politician who sat in the House of Commons between 1679 and 1701.

== History ==
William Wogan was born circa 1638, the second son of Thomas Wogan; a member of the Llanstinan branch of the Wogan family, and Elizabeth, daughter of John Owen of Berllan, Pembrokeshire. Wogan achieved distinction in law and was admitted to Gray's Inn on 23 May 1653 and was called to the Bar on 1 June 1660.

His first attempt to enter Parliament was in 1677, when he unsuccessfully petitioned for the seat of Haverfordwest. In February 1679 he succeeded in becoming the Member of Parliament for Haverfordwest, holding the seat until July of that year. He returned to Parliament in March 1681, this time as the member for Pembrokeshire, a position he held until 1685. He then successfully contested Haverfordwest, holding the seat in 1685–1687 and again in 1689–1701.

In 1678, Wogan was involved in preparing the impeachment of Lord Danby and was vocal in the affair after the event.

On 31 October 1689 Wogan was knighted at Whitehall, having been made a Serjeant-at-Law and then King's Serjeant, earlier that year. From 1689 until 1701, Wogan was the chief justice of the Carmarthen circuit of the Great Sessions in Wales. It was mentioned that Wogan was a candidate to succeed both Sir John Trevor as the Commissioner of the Great Seal and Sir John Trenchard as Chief Justice of Chester, but he never took either office.

== Personal history ==
Wogan was married twice. His first wife was Elizabeth, daughter of Sir John Ashburnam, and widow of Sir John Jacob of Bromley. Elizabeth died in 1697 and he then remarried to the daughter of Dame Elizabeth Purbeck of Hatton Gardens. Wogan died without issue on 1 December 1708.

Parliament of England
Preceded by Herbert Perrott	Member of Parliament for Haverfordwest; 1679	Succeeded by Thomas Owen
Preceded by Sir John Howard	Member of Parliament for Pembrokeshire; 1681–1685	Succeeded by William Barlow
Preceded by Thomas Howard	Member of Parliament for Haverfordwest; 1685–1700	Succeeded by William Wheeler
