= Scleddau =

Village and community in Pembrokeshire, Wales

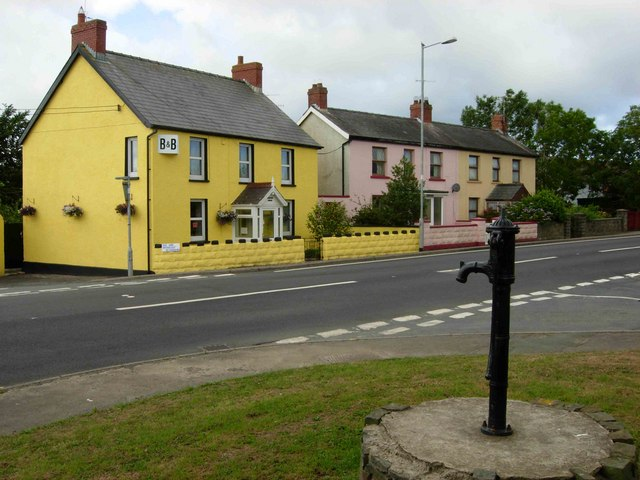

- Location within Pembrokeshire
- Population: 1,013 (2011)
- OS grid reference: SM 9441 3419
  - Cardiff: 84.8 mi (136.5 km)
  - London: 210.6 mi (338.9 km)
- Principal area: Pembrokeshire
- Country: Wales
- Sovereign state: United Kingdom
- Post town: Abergwaun
- Postcode district: SA65
- Police: Dyfed-Powys
- Fire: Mid and West Wales
- Ambulance: Welsh
- UK Parliament: Ceredigion Preseli
- Senedd Cymru – Welsh Parliament: Ceredigion Penfro
- List of places UK Wales Pembrokeshire 51.9681°N 4.9942°W Map of the community

Scleddau is a village and a community in the county of Pembrokeshire, Wales, and is 2 miles (3.2 km) south of Fishguard on the main A40 road. The Western Cleddau river which lends its name to the village flows under the main road. There are several springs in the village.

In 2011 the population of Scleddau was 1,013 with 34.2 per cent able to speak Welsh.

== History ==
Castell Hendre-Wen and the round barrow on Jordanston Hill are both prehistoric scheduled monuments dating back to the early Iron Age. 1 mile (1.6 km) east of Scleddau, and within the community, is the Grade II* listed Llanstinan parish church, dedicated to St Justinian. Scleddau sits at the tripoint of three ancient parishes: Llanstinan, Manorowen and Fishguard, and was historically within Manorowen parish.

In the 1840s, the village became involved in the disputes known as the Rebecca riots. On 27 June 1843 the tollgate at Scleddau on the turnpike between Haverfordwest and Fishguard was attacked and destroyed by a large number of people.

== Listed buildings ==
Sion Chapel was built in 1859 and is a Grade II listed building, one of 24 listed buildings in the community.

== Governance ==
In 2011, Trecwn community was amalgamated with (absorbed into) Scleddau community. An electoral ward in the same name exists. This ward stretches to the coast at Strumble Head with a total population of 1,487.
