= William Henry Scourfield =

Welsh landowner and Tory politician

William Henry Scourfield (1776 – 31 January 1843) was a Welsh landowner and Tory politician.

== Biography ==
Scourfield was the son of Henry Scourfield and his wife Elizabeth (daughter of Rev John Ewer of Bangor), of the Scourfield family of New Moat and Robeston Hall. Scourfield was educated at New College, Oxford, and on 27 October 1804 he married Maria Goate, daughter of Lt. Colonel Edward Goate of Brent Eleigh Hall, Suffolk. Despite his father having moved the family from New Moat in Pembrokeshire to Robeston Hall near Milford Haven, purchased from the pioneer industrialist Thomas Kymer, Scourfield returned to New Moat on his father's death in 1805 and proceed to rebuild the old estate, The Mote. He was appointed High Sheriff of Pembrokeshire for 1812/13.

== Political career ==
Scourfield was a Tory by political leaning and had supported Lords Milford and Kensington in their elections as well as Lord Cowder's son in his 1812 campaign to win the county seat of Carmarthen. In 1816 Milford and Kensington fell out after Cowder allied himself to their joint enemy John Owen. Kensington, who had sat as Member of Parliament (MP) for Haverfordwest with Milford's support, was obliged to lose the seat at the coming election. Milford had earmarked Scourfield for the seat of Haverfordwest since 1805, and with Kensingtons's support, Scourfield became Member of Parliament for Haverfordwest in 1818. He was re-elected unopposed in 1820 but in 1826 the seat was taken by Milford's heir Richard Phillips, who had come of age. Although William Holmes wrote to Robert Peel in 1823, stating that Scourfield held the seat in opposition to Milford's interest, it was truer that Scourfield was an independent Parliamentarian, with a greater desire to serve his constituents than be involved in political machinations. In 1835 Scourfield was re-elected to Haverfordwest, the same year that his wife Maria died. He left Parliament for good in 1837.

== Later life and death ==
On 28 December 1837 Scourfield married for a second time, to Louisa Sarah, daughter of Richard Bowen of Manorowen.

Scourfield died without an heir in 1843 and left the estate to his sister, Elizabeth Anne Scourfield. She was married to Colonel Owen Phillips of Williamston in 1804, and they left The Mote to their son, John Henry Phillips (1808–1876) who took the surname Scourfield in 1862.

Parliament of the United Kingdom
Preceded by Lord Kensington	Member of Parliament for Haverfordwest; 1818–1826	Succeeded by Richard Phillips
Preceded by Richard Phillips	Member of Parliament for Haverfordwest; 1835–1837	Succeeded by Sir Richard Phillips
