= William Edwardes, 2nd Baron Kensington =

British peer (1777–1852)

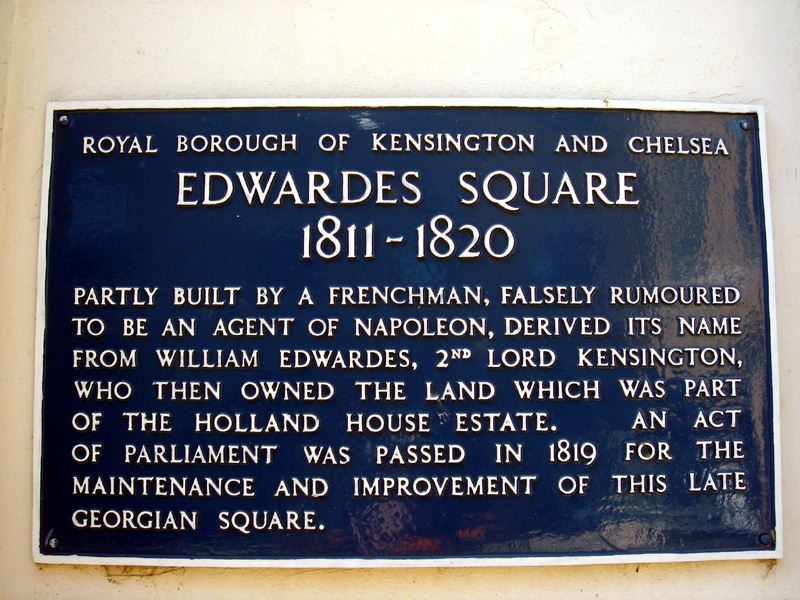
- Edwardes Square sign, London W8, named after Lord Kensington.

Member of Parliament for Haverfordwest
- In office 1802-1818

Personal details
- Born: 24 April 1777
- Died: 10 August 1852 (aged 75)
- Party: Whig
- Spouse: Dorothy Thomas (m. 1797)
- Children: 8, including William
- Parent: William Edwardes (father)

William Edwardes, 2nd Baron Kensington (24 April 1777 – 10 August 1852), styled The Honourable William Edwardes until 1801, was a British peer and Member of Parliament. He was the instigator of the infamous Kensington Canal.

== Biography ==
Kensington was the son of William Edwardes, 1st Baron Kensington, who represented Haverfordwest in the House of Commons for over 50 years, and Elizabeth Warren. He was commander of the Cambrian Rangers a fencible regiment stationed in Gibraltar in 1801

He succeeded his father as second Baron Kensington in 1801 but as this was an Irish peerage it did not entitle him to an automatic seat in the House of Lords. He was instead elected to succeed his father as Member of Parliament for Haverfordwest in 1802, a seat he held until 1818. Haverfordwest was considered a pocket borough of the Picton Castle estate and both Kensington and his father held the seat as part of an arrangement with Lord Milford, the owner of the estate and Lord Lieutenant of Pembrokeshire. He belonged to the Whig Party.

In 1831, he was a prominent supporter of the Reform Bill.

Lord Kensington married Dorothy Patricia Thomas, daughter of Richard Thomas, in 1797; they had six sons and two daughters. He died in August 1852, aged 75, and Edwardes Square, London W8 is named in his honour. He was succeeded in the barony by his son William.

Another son, George Warren Edwardes (1802–1879), joined the army and then the colonial service. London and Edinburgh Gazette entries record his early career: he joined the 17th Dragoons as a Cornet by purchase in 1824, transferred to be a Cornet and Sub-Lieutenant in 2nd Life Guards in the same year, and had risen to captain in 32nd Foot by 1828. In 1836 he went on half-pay in the 14th Foot until transferring to the 72nd Foot in 1840. He was appointed Colonial Auditor at St Helena in 1845 and was still there when his father died. In 1856 he became Governor of Labuan. He was a "bitter enemy of the Brookes...deeply jealous of Sarawak" (the adjacent British-ruled, albeit independent, power)., which led to his being relieved of his position as Consul-General to Brunei, and his Governorship terminated, in 1861 after he had incurred British government displeasure for his use of the HEIC steamer Victoria to travel to Muka and threaten to fire a broadside at Sarawak forces unless they ceased their activities against Sherip Masahor. Never married, he died at Chandos House London on 21 February 1879 and was buried in Kent.

== Sources ==
- Williams, David (1960). "The Pembrokeshire Elections of 1831" (PDF). Welsh History Review. 1 (1): 37–64.
- Kidd, Charles, Williamson, David (editors). Debrett's Peerage and Baronetage (1990 edition). New York: St Martin's Press, 1990.
- Leigh Rayment's Peerage Pages

Parliament of the United Kingdom
Preceded by The Lord Kensington	Member of Parliament for Haverfordwest; 1802–1818	Succeeded by William Henry Scourfield
Peerage of Ireland
Preceded by William Edwardes	Baron Kensington; 1801–1852	Succeeded by William Edwardes
