= Dungleddy =

Former Hundred in Pembrokeshire, Wales

Coordinates: 51.868°N 4.717°W

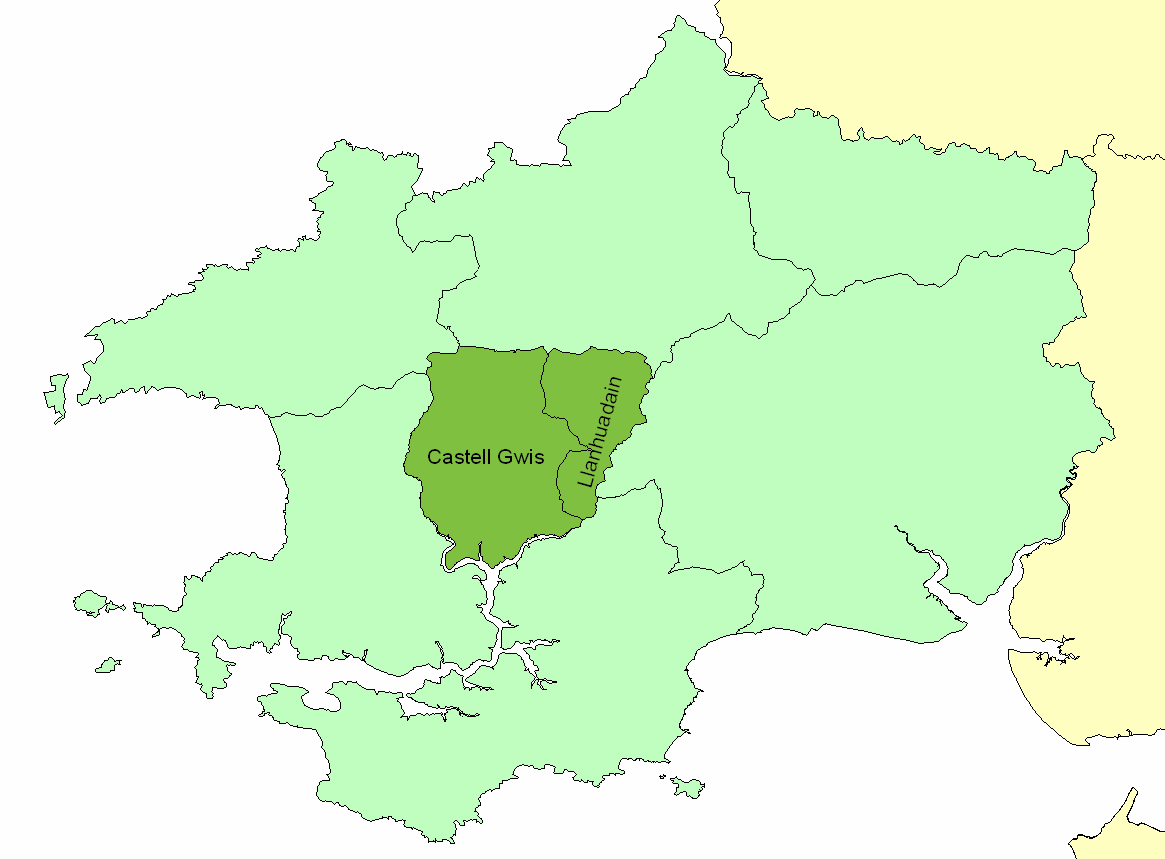
Ancient Dyfed showing Deugleddyf Cantref and its "commotes"

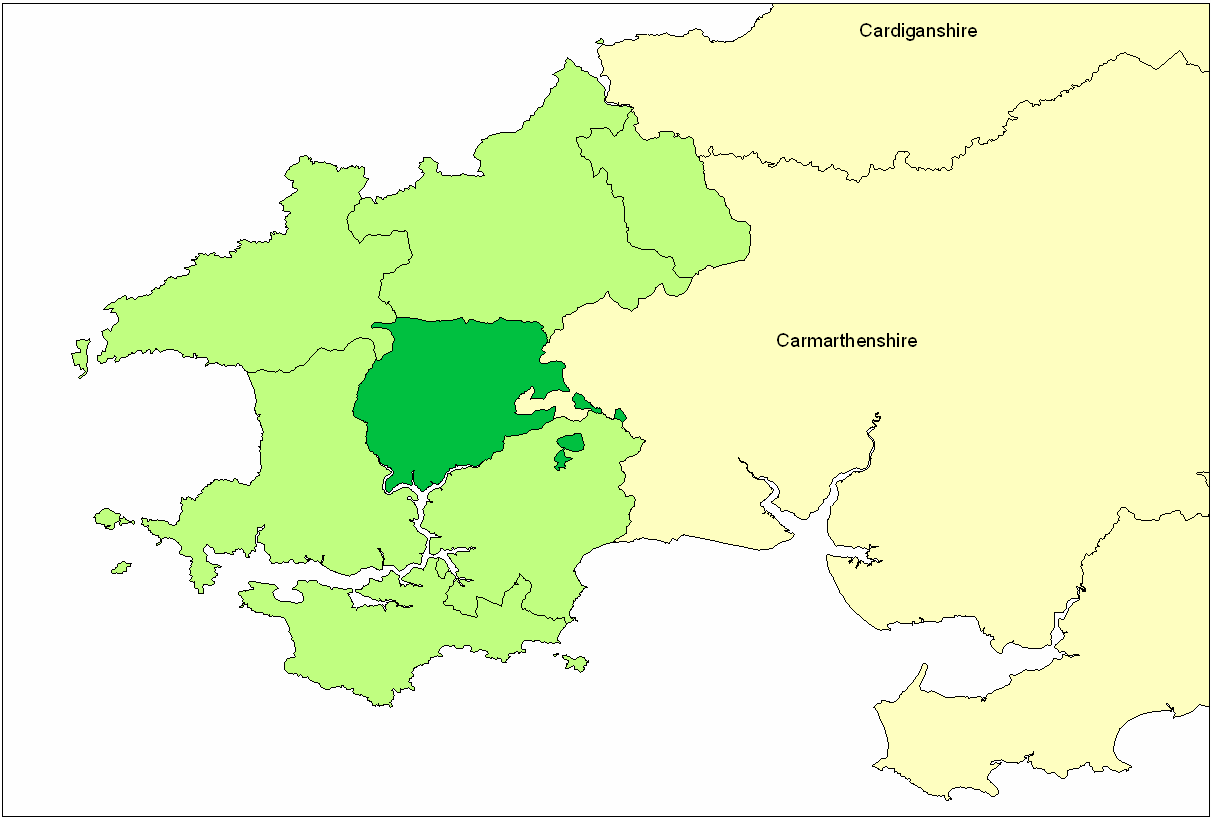
Pembrokeshire showing Dungleddy Hundred

The Hundred of Dungleddy was a hundred in the centre of Pembrokeshire, Wales. It had its origins in the pre-Norman Conquest cantref of Deugleddyf. It derives its Welsh name from its position between the two branches of the River Cleddau (Cleddyf): the English form is a corruption of the Welsh. The area of the cantref was around 185 km^{2}: it was the smallest of the seven cantrefi of Dyfed.

The cantref was allegedly divided into two commotes. The Red Book of Hergest calls these "Castell Hu" (= modern Cas-wis or Wiston) and "Llan y Hadein" (=Llanhuadain or Llawhaden). These both appear to be post-Norman lordships and are not genuine native subdivisions. The western part of the hundred was English-speaking from the time of the Norman conquest, and formed part of Little England beyond Wales: the eastern part was part of the Lordship of the Bishop of St David's, and George Owen described it as bilingual. The three northeastern parishes of Llys y Fran, New Moat and Bletherston were Welsh-speaking during the 20th century.

As their names imply, the civil headquarters of the commotes were at Wiston and Llawhaden, and the latter the cantref's ecclesiastical centre, perhaps the seat of a bishop during the Age of the Saints.

Dungleddy was formalised as a hundred by the Laws in Wales Acts 1535-1542: a small part was transferred to the hundred of Dewisland, and various fragments of church land (Llandissilio, Llanfallteg, Llangan, Crinow, Henllan, Grondre and western Llawhaden) were acquired from Cantref Gwarthaf.

The name continues in the present day as Daugleddau, a Church in Wales parish in the Diocese of St Davids, combining 13 former Anglican parishes of Pembrokeshire.
