= William Edwardes, 3rd Baron Kensington =

British Baron and naval commander (1801–1872)

Captain The Right Honourable The Lord Kensington
- Born: 3 February 1801
- Died: 1 January 1872 (aged 70)
- Spouse: Laura Ellison (m. 1833)
- Children: William Edwardes, 4th Baron Kensington
- Military career
- Branch: Royal Navy
- Rank: Captain
- Commands: HMS Gannet
- Conflicts: Napoleonic Wars; Greek War of Independence; Battle of Navarino

William Edwardes, 3rd Baron Kensington (3 February 1801 – 1 January 1872) was a British peer and naval commander.

== Biography ==
Kensington was the son of William Edwardes, 2nd Baron Kensington, and Dorothy Patricia Thomas. He succeeded his father as third Baron Kensington in 1852 but as this was an Irish peerage it did not entitle him to a seat in the House of Lords. Kensington served in the Royal Navy and achieved the rank of captain. He was also Lord Lieutenant of Pembrokeshire.

Lord Kensington married Laura Jane Ellison, daughter of Cuthbert Ellison and Isabella Grace Ibottson, on 12 October 1833. They had six children, the eldest being William Edwardes, 4th Baron Kensington. After his death on 1 January 1872, aged 70, he was succeeded in the barony by his son, who became a Liberal politician.

== See also ==
- O'Byrne, William Richard (1849). "Edwardes, William" . A Naval Biographical Dictionary . John Murray – via Wikisource.
- Burke's Peerage

Honorary titles
Preceded by Sir John Owen, Bt	Lord Lieutenant of Pembrokeshire; 1861–1872	Succeeded by The Lord Kensington
Peerage of Ireland
Preceded by William Edwardes	Baron Kensington; 1852–1872	Succeeded by William Edwardes
