= Trecwn =

Village in Pembrokeshire, Wales

Coordinates: 51.954969°N 4.960174°W

Trecwn: Welsh: Trecŵn
- Location within Pembrokeshire
- OS grid reference: SM 96691 32638
  - Cardiff: 107 mi (172 km)
- Community: Scleddau
- Principal area: Pembrokeshire
- Preserved county: Dyfed
- Country: Wales
- Sovereign state: United Kingdom
- Post town: HAVERFORDWEST
- Postcode district: SA62
- Police: Dyfed-Powys
- Fire: Mid and West Wales
- Ambulance: Welsh
- UK Parliament: Preseli Pembrokeshire
- Senedd Cymru – Welsh Parliament: Preseli Pembrokeshire

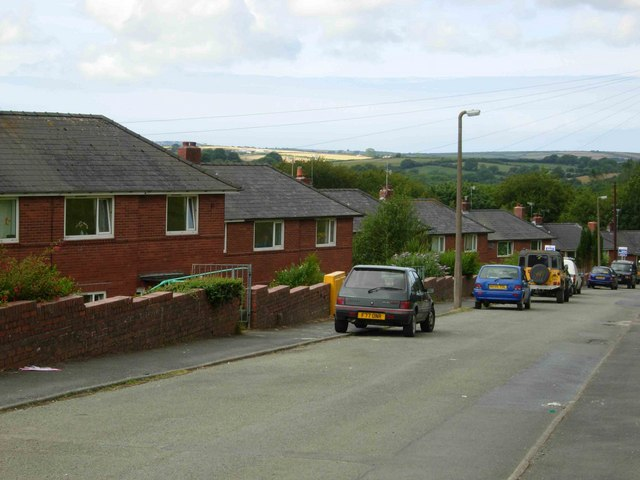
Royal Naval Armaments Depot worker's houses

Trecwn (Welsh: Trecŵn [trɛˈkuːn]) is a village in Pembrokeshire, west Wales, 1.6 miles (2.6 km) east of the A40 (Fishguard to Haverfordwest) road in the community of Scleddau. It is in the parish of Llanstinan.

== History ==
The history of Trecwn in the 18th and 19th centuries is linked with the Barham family, who funded the building of the school in 1877. Barham Memorial School, a Grade II listed building, closed in 2001 following the closure of the armaments depot (see below) a few years before. Joseph Foster Barham (1759–1832) and his son Charles Henry Foster Barham (1808–1878) were both members of parliament, Joseph for Stockbridge, Hampshire, and Charles for Appleby.

Trecwn was a community in its own right until 2007; however, the population had decreased significantly from 366 to 260 in the years 1980 to 2006, so it was merged into the community of Scleddau from 3 May 2012.

== Church ==
The Llanstinan parish church of St Justinian is a Grade II* listed building of mediaeval origin, rebuilt in the 19th century.

== Armaments depot ==
RNAD Trecwn is a decommissioned 1100-acre (450 ha) Royal Navy Armaments Depot. It was closed in 1995 with the loss of 500 jobs. Omega Pacific in 1998 tentatively proposed the site could be used for storing low-level nuclear waste, a plan shelved owing to public opposition. In 2001 German company EBV suggested using the site for weapons reclamation. In 2003 the owners announced that the tenanted homes on the site would be sold on the open market.

Plans submitted by The Valley (Pembrokeshire) Ltd to build a 25-megawatt biomass energy plant on the site were conditionally approved in 2015, but by August 2018 work, with the promise of 40 jobs, had not been started by current owners Manhattan Loft Corporation, leading to questions by the local councillor.
