= William Philipps (MP for Haverfordwest) =

Welsh politician

William Philipps (c. 1615 – c. 1689) was a Welsh politician who sat in the House of Commons in 1660.

Philipps was a member of the Philipps family of Picton Castle, Pembrokeshire, being described as a local Royalist and cousin of James Philipps. He was the son of John Philipps of Haythog and educated at Balliol College, Oxford, where he matriculated on 15 June 1632, aged 17. He then studied law at Gray's Inn (1635), and was called to the bar in 1642. He succeeded his father before 1650 and was appointed High Sheriff of Pembrokeshire for 1645–46.

He may have been the William Phillipps of Heathook, Pembrokeshire who was a zealous royalist. Information was laid against him on 29 June 1649 that he was a delinquent and he was excepted from the General Pardon for South Wales and Monmouthshire on 26 February 1651. His estates were sequestered by the Committee for South Wales on 13 May 1651 by order of the Committee for Compounding, London, on the grounds that he was concerned in Poyer's Rising of 1648.

In 1660, Philipps was elected Member of Parliament for Haverfordwest in the Convention Parliament. His opponent Sampson Lort claimed victory after being judged unsuitable by the corporation in view of his oppressive behaviour during the interregnum and the election was declared void on 29 June. Philipps was re-elected on 7 August 1660. He served as deputy lieutenant of Cardiganshire from 1674 to February, 1688.

He married Martha Price of Kingston upon Thames, Surrey. They had a son, who predeceased his father and 4 daughters. Picton castle passed to his brother Morgan, and thence to his descendants.
