= Thomas ab Owen =

16th-century Welsh politician

Thomas ab Owen (by 1511 – 1575 or later), of Haverfordwest, Pembrokeshire, was a Welsh politician.

== Family ==
Thomas married, by 1532, a woman named Isabella.

== Career ==
Thomas was a member of parliament for Haverfordwest in 1558.
