= Manorowen =

Village in Pembrokeshire, Wales

Coordinates: 51.98°N 5.01°W

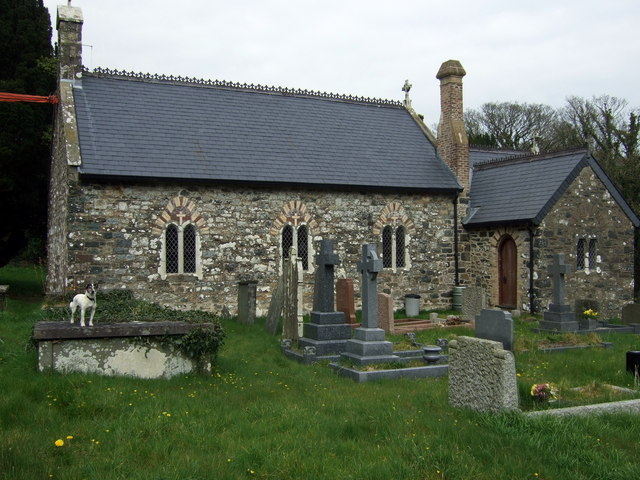
- South aspect of St Mary's Church

- Location within Pembrokeshire
- OS grid reference: SM9336
- Community: Scleddau
- Principal area: Pembrokeshire
- Preserved county: Dyfed
- Country: Wales
- Sovereign state: United Kingdom
- Post town: Fishguard
- Postcode district: SA65
- Police: Dyfed-Powys
- Fire: Mid and West Wales
- Ambulance: Welsh
- UK Parliament: Preseli Pembrokeshire
- Senedd Cymru – Welsh Parliament: Preseli Pembrokeshire

Manorowen is a small settlement and parish on the A487 2 miles (3.2 km) southwest of Fishguard, Pembrokeshire, West Wales, in the Community of Scleddau; the parish includes the village of Scleddau—the eastern part of which is in the neighbouring parish of Llanstinan. A listed property bears the name of the parish, and the church is dedicated to St Mary.

== History ==
The origin of the parish name is obscure because there have been many different spellings throughout history, including Maenor Owain, Manerowen, Manorawen and Manernawen, but the earliest recorded document is dated 1453. It is marked as Manerowen on a 1583 parish map of Pembrokeshire.

In 1688 John Lewis Esquire of Manernawen (sic) was appointed Commissioner for Haverfordwest under an act to collect money for a royal grant.

The parish church of St Mary is 19th century with later additions, but contains a memorial dated about 1670; the oldest gravestone is about 1791. The church was closed for a time following a bat infestation, but remedial work resulted in its reopening in 2015.

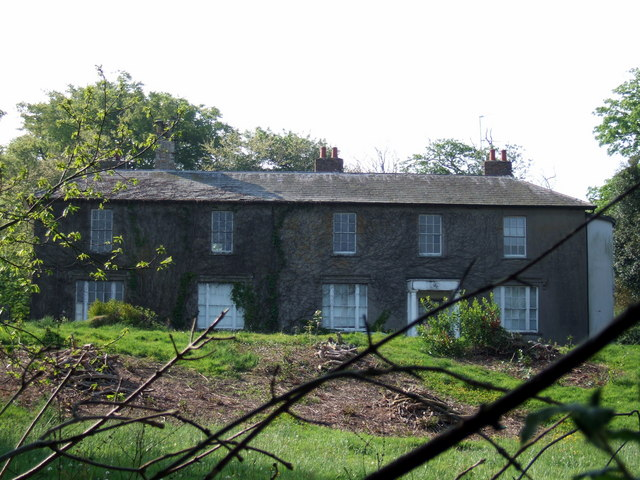
Manorowen House in 2007

Manorowen is the name of an estate, whose house, walled garden and gazebo are Grade II listed. The present house dates from about 1830. According to the charity Parks and Gardens, the site was first created between 1650 and 1699, and was recorded by Richard Fenton as belonging to his great grandfather John Lewis (see above) in the late 17th century when it was called Manarnawen. The gardens are listed at Grade II on the Cadw/ICOMOS Register of Parks and Gardens of Special Historic Interest in Wales.

Lewis's 1833 Topographical Dictionary of Wales notes Manorowen (or Maenor-Owain) as being a small parish in the Hundred of Dewisland, with 220 inhabitants. From 1913 until 2004, there was a school at Manorowen. The school's log books, admission register, photographs and miscellaneous papers are held at the Pembrokeshire Archives.

== Notable people ==
David Jones, vicar of Llangan and an early supporter of Welsh Calvinistic Methodism, lived in Manorowen and Richard Fenton (1747-1821) is buried there.
