= Penffordd, Pembrokeshire =

Village in Pembrokeshire, Wales

Coordinates: 51.86°N 4.8°W

Penffordd: Welsh: Pen-ffordd
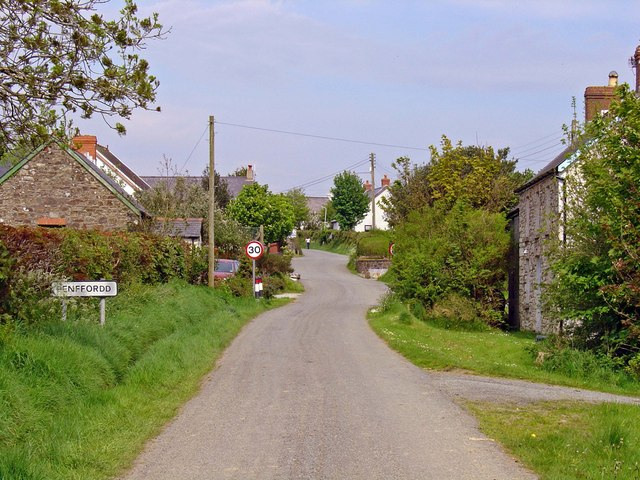
- Penffordd

- Location within Pembrokeshire
- OS grid reference: SN0722
- Community: Bletherston
- Principal area: Pembrokeshire
- Country: Wales
- Sovereign state: United Kingdom
- Post town: Clunderwen
- Police: Dyfed-Powys
- Fire: Mid and West Wales
- Ambulance: Welsh

Penffordd or Pen-ffordd is a small village in the community of New Moat, Pembrokeshire, Wales, in the parish of Bletherston. It lies approximately 10.8 miles (17.4 km) northeast of Haverfordwest.

== Name ==
The descriptive name translates into English as top of the road, and is on a small hill at 100 m elevation.

== History ==
According to pre-1850 parish maps there was an inn in the village. The Cross Inn was run by Ann Phillips in 1908, when an unfortunate accident occurred outside; a labourer, Thomas Murphy, whom witnesses said was sober, boasted that he could lift a log estimated at 2cwt (100 kg), but fell and fractured his skull, dying later that night.

Penffordd was in 1895 described thus: “This quiet, out-of-the-way village seems to be intent on keeping pace with the times” in a press report on a meeting of Penffordd Literary Society in the chapel, presided over by the Rev D Richards and attended by “a very large number” of people. The report concluded:

The manner in which the Penfford [sic] people spend their spare hours is certainly commendable and worthy of being copied by more highly privileged places. The school children did their parts in a highly creditable manner.

A report of the same society's annual meeting in 1899 was equally praising, noting that the school was fortunate to have "such a go-ahead superintendent", Mr B. F. Williams, and giving the highest praise to the Ladies Choir.

== Worship ==
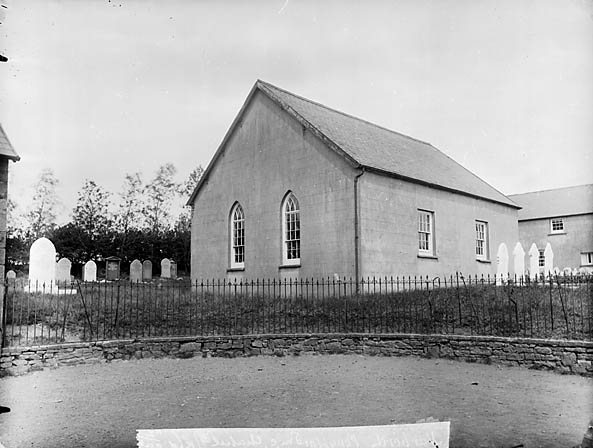
Pen-ffordd CM Chapel (about 1885)

Penffordd is in the parish (Church in Wales) of Bletherston.

Penffordd Calvinist Methodist Chapel was built in 1861 and restored in 1913. The minister in 1893 was the Reverend David Richards. The Rev. Benjamin Jones was minister of Penffordd and Gwastad in the early 1900s. The chapel was still used for worship in 2000, but subsequently became home to a leather-working enterprise.

== Education ==
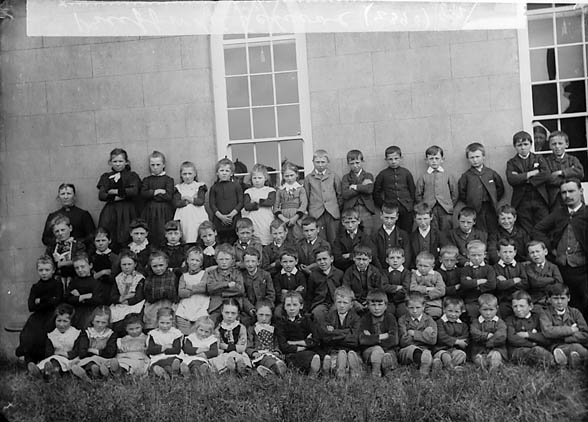
Pen-fford School pupils (about 1885)

In 1885, about 57 children were attending Pen-ffordd Primary School, which had opened in 1866. In December 1888, in “very unfavourable weather”, the school hosted the first meeting of the Haverfordwest Habitation of the Primrose League. The school closed in 2001 with pupils numbering 17. The school log books and admission register, 1898–2001, are held at the National Archives.

== Business ==
Nearby Sheepwalk Nurseries are home to Pembrokeshire Cider and Perry Company. Pembrokeshire Leatherwork is based in the former chapel.

== Notable people ==
Rugby union international Brian Williams (1962-2007) was born in Penffordd.
