= Thomas Howard (English MP) =

Member of the Parliament of England

Thomas Howard (died 1682) was elected MP for Haverfordwest Parliament constituency in 1681.
