= John Evans (Haverfordwest MP) =

British Liberal politician

John Evans MP

Member of Parliament for Haverfordwest
- In office 1847–1852
- Preceded by: Sir Richard Philipps, Bt
- Succeeded by: John Scourfield

Personal details
- Died: 1864
- Party: Liberal

John Evans QC (died 1864) was a British Liberal politician. He represented Haverfordwest in Pembrokeshire, Wales, from the 1847 general election until his defeat in the 1852 general election.

At an 1855 by-election, he unsuccessfully sought election for Cardigan Boroughs.

After his death in 1864 his widow Mary and their children moved back from London to Haverfordwest and later to Jersey. In 1881 his children, including the poet George Essex Evans, emigrated to Australia.
