= Herbert Perrott (politician) =

English politician

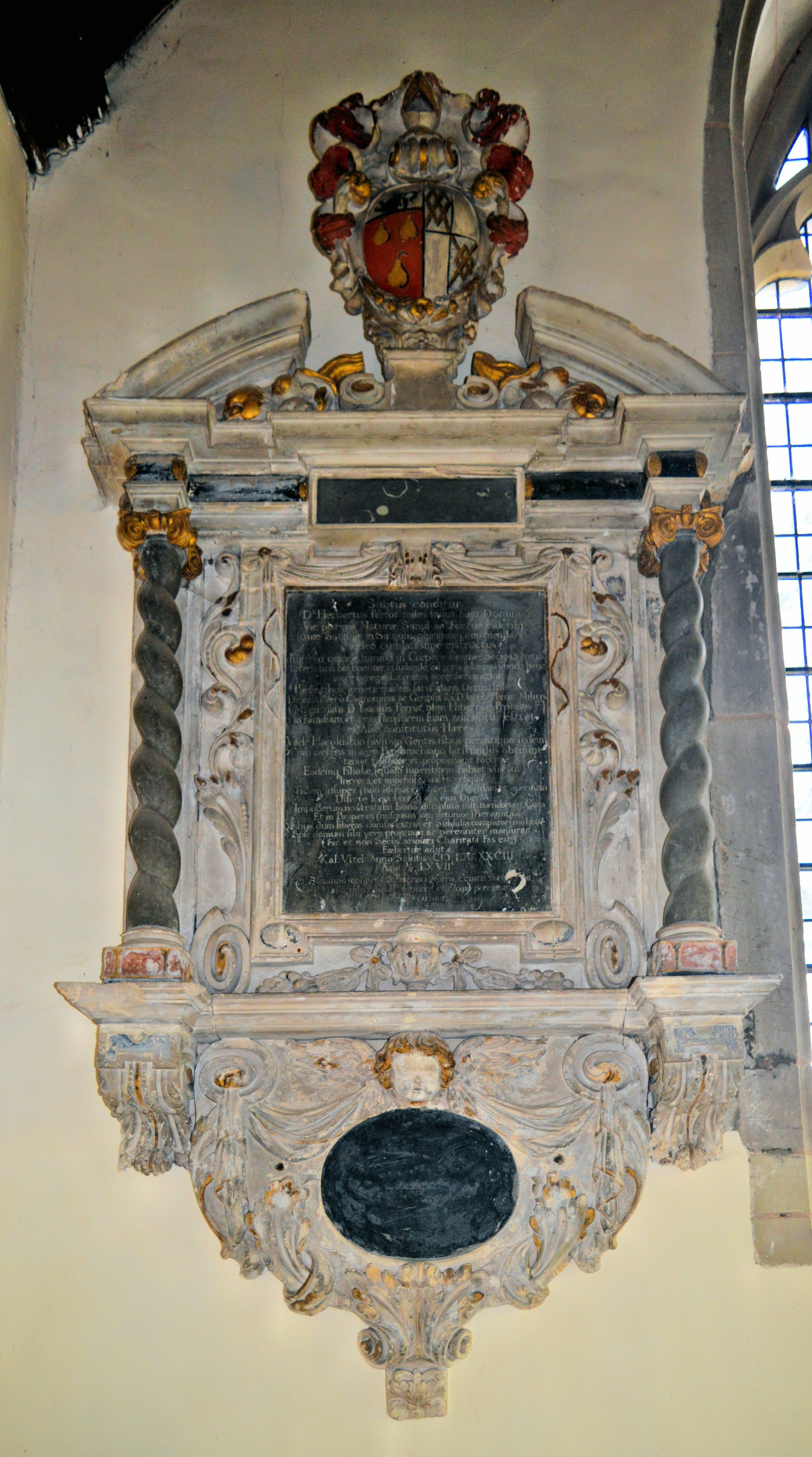
Mural monument to Sir Herbert Perrott, Church of St Margaret of Antioch, Wellington, Herefordshire

Sir Herbert Perrott (c. 1617 – 1 August 1683) was an English politician who sat in the House of Commons at various times between 1659 and 1679.

Perrott was the son of Robert Perrott of Moreton. He was of Haroldston and Wellington, Herefordshire. He was a cousin of his fellow MP Thomas Tomkins.

In 1659, Perrott was elected Member of Parliament for Weobley in the Third Protectorate Parliament. He was re-elected MP for Weobley in the Convention Parliament in August 1660 after the previous election was declared void. He was knighted on 14 August 1660 and served as High Sheriff of Herefordshire for 1661–62 and High Sheriff of Pembrokeshire for 1665–66.

In 1677, Perrott was elected MP for Haverfordwest in the Cavalier Parliament and sat until 1679.

Perrott died at the age of 66 and was commemorated in a tablet in Wellington Church. He had married a daughter of George Barlow of Slebech and sister of Sir John Barlow. His daughter Hester married Sir John Pakington, 4th Baronet.

Parliament of England
Preceded by Not represented in Second Protectorate Parliament	Member of Parliament for Weobley; 1659; With: Robert Andrews	Succeeded by Robert Andrews
Preceded by Sir Frederick Hyde	Member of Parliament for Haverfordwest; 1677–1679	Succeeded by William Wogan
