= Morgan Rhys (disambiguation) =

Morgan Rhys (1716–1779) was a Welsh hymn-writer.

Morgan Rhys may also refer to:

- Morgan John Rhys (1760–1804) Welsh Baptist minister
- Morgan ap Rhys ap Philip (16th century), Welsh politician

== See also ==
- Rhys Morgan (disambiguation)
