= John Scourfield =

Welsh politician (1808–1876)

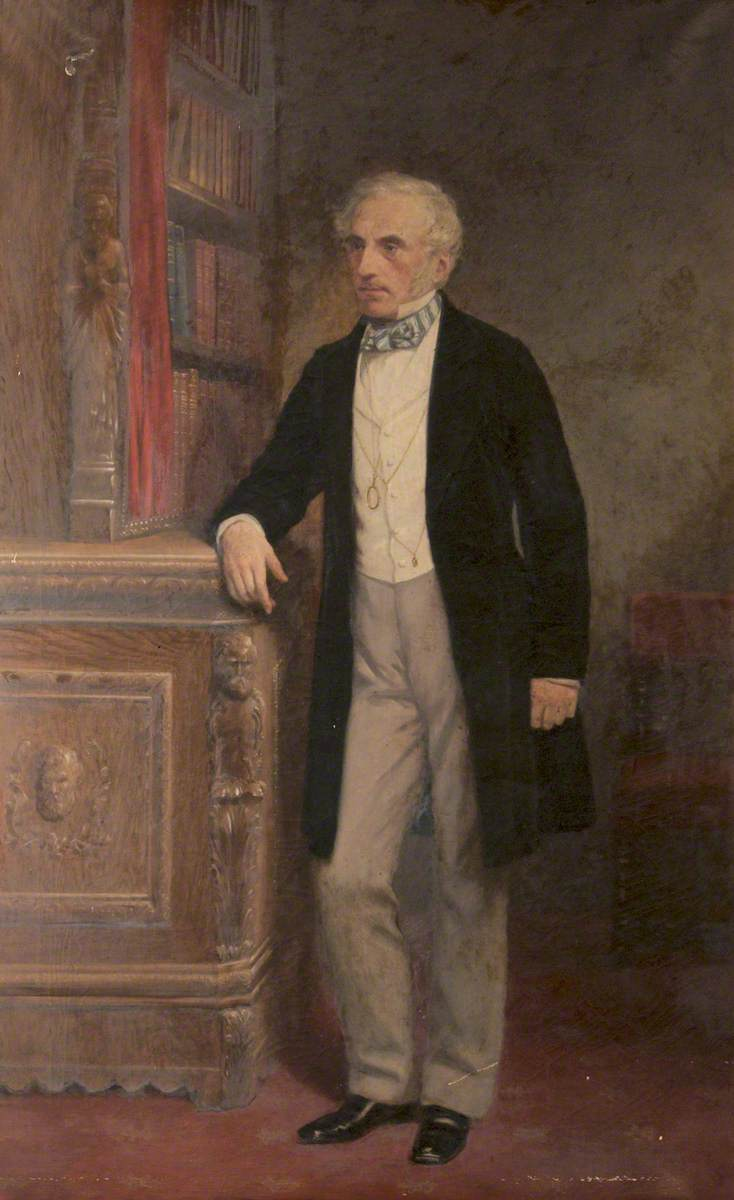
Sir John Henry Philipps-Scourfield at the House of Commons

Sir John Henry Scourfield, 1st Baronet (30 January 1808 – 3 June 1876) was a Welsh Conservative politician who sat in the House of Commons from 1852 to 1876.

== Life ==
Scourfield was born John Henry Phillips, the son of Owen Phillips of Williamstown, Pembrokeshire, Wales and his wife Ann Elizabeth Scourfield, niece of William Henry Scourfield of the Mote and Robeston Hall. He was educated at Harrow School and at Oriel College, Oxford graduating BA 3rd class in classics in 1828 and MA in 1832.

He was a deputy lieutenant and J.P. for Pembroke and chairman of the Quarter Sessions of Pembroke. He was also High Sheriff of Pembrokeshire in 1833 and lord-lieutenant and Custos Rotulorum of the borough of Haverfordwest. In 1862 he assumed the name of Scourfield by Royal Licence on succeeding to the estates of his maternal uncle.

== Political career ==
At the 1852 general election Scourfield was elected member of parliament for Haverfordwest and held the seat until 1868. In 1857 he narrowly held on to the seat by two votes over the Liberal candidate William Rees, in a contest characterised by accusations of intimidation.

At the 1868 general election he was elected MP for Pembrokeshire and held the seat until his death aged 68 in 1876. He was created a baronet by Disraeli on 18 February 1876 but died the following May.

He was against the Women's Disabilities Removal Bill, an early women's suffrage bill. He argued, in May 1872, that the novelist Jane Austen would be, too, were she alive. Scourfield argued this by using a quotation from Austen's novel Emma (1816), which was itself a quotation from Oliver Goldsmith, taken out of context. This appears to be the first time that Austen's name was referenced in official business in parliament.

== Cricket ==
As John Philipps, he was a cricketer with amateur status who was associated with Marylebone Cricket Club (MCC) and made his debut in 1830.

== Works ==
He was the author of a number of published plays and poems.

== Family ==
Scourfield married in 1845 Augusta Phillips, daughter of John Lort Phillips of Haverfordwest and Llawrenny Park, Pembrokeshire. They had two sons, the eldest of which, Owen, succeeded to the baronetcy (which became extinct on his death).

== Notes ==
Parliament of the United Kingdom
Preceded by John Evans	Member of Parliament for Haverfordwest; 1847 – 1868	Succeeded by William Edwardes
Baronetage of the United Kingdom
New creation	Baronet (of the Mote and Williamston); 1876	Succeeded by Owen Scourfield
