= Llanstinan =

Parish in Pembrokeshire, Wales

Coordinates: 51.96°N 4.98°W

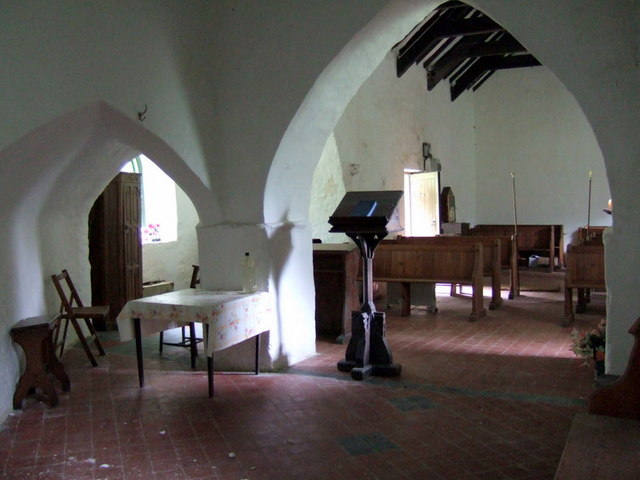
- Interior of St Justinian's

- Location within Pembrokeshire
- Community: Scleddau
- Principal area: Pembrokeshire
- Country: Wales
- Sovereign state: United Kingdom
- Police: Dyfed-Powys
- Fire: Mid and West Wales
- Ambulance: Welsh
- UK Parliament: Preseli Pembrokeshire
- Senedd Cymru – Welsh Parliament: Preeli Pembrokeshire

Llanstinan is a rural parish in the community of Scleddau, north Pembrokeshire, Wales, 3 miles (4.8 km) south of Fishguard.

== History ==
=== Parish ===
Originally in the ancient Hundred of Dewisland, formerly a pre-Norman cantref, the parish is bordered in the west by the Western Cleddau river and in the east by Nant y Bugail; it is entirely rural. Decayed but distinct prehistoric earthworks exist. A 1578 map in the British Library shows the parish as Llannastynan. A village named Llanstinan does not appear to have ever existed; the nearby villages of Trecwn in the east and Scleddau in the west have gained more prominence. (Note: The writer Elizabeth Rees in Celtic Sites and their Saints (see Further reading) asserts that Scleddau once surrounded the church but this part of the settlement has disappeared) The population in 1801 was 114. Lewis's Topographical Dictionary of 1833 gives the population as 168. The 1849 edition expands the population to 170, and notes that there is a small slate quarry in the parish and a Calvinist Methodist place of worship. By the 1870s the population was 174, in 36 houses.

The parish is now part of the Benefice of Llanwnda (St Gwyndaf) and Goodwick (St Peter) with Manorowen and Llanstinan in the Diocese of St David's.

=== Parish church ===
The parish church of St Justinian, isolated in farmland, is mediaeval or Norman in origin, but was substantially rebuilt in the 19th century. It is a Grade II* listed building.

== Notable people ==
Sir William Wogan was a member of the influential Wogan family of Llanstinan who died in 1710, leaving his estate to a Symmons relative. The Reverend Dr Charles Symmons (1749–1826) was a grandson of John Symmons (1701–64) of Llanstinan. The Symmons family was a significant one in the area, and beyond. Their seat was Llanstinan House, which was acquired by a member of another significant local family, Sir Hugh Owen (1803–91), in the 19th century. The Royal Commission in about 2003 published a paper on the status and history of the house, whose origins are thought to date back to the 16th century, and since then has seen luxurious times to more recent decay. Richard Fenton in 1811 referred to Llanstinan as "...a place I shall ever remember, with an affection that I want words to express..."
