= Llys-y-frân =

Village and parish in Pembrokeshire, Wales

Coordinates: 51.88°N 4.85°W

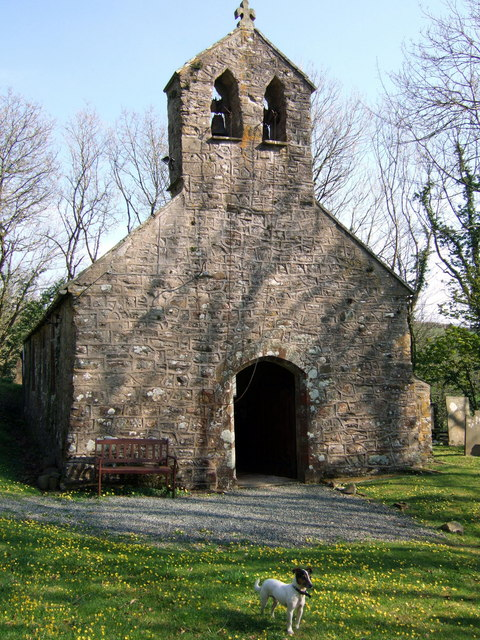
- St Meilyr's Church

- Location within Pembrokeshire
- OS grid reference: SN0424
- Community: New Moat
- Principal area: Pembrokeshire
- Country: Wales
- Sovereign state: United Kingdom
- Postcode district: SA
- Police: Dyfed-Powys
- Fire: Mid and West Wales
- Ambulance: Welsh
- UK Parliament: Preseli Pembrokeshire
- Senedd Cymru – Welsh Parliament: Preseli Pembrokeshire

Llys-y-frân is a small village and parish in the community of New Moat on the southern slopes of the Preseli Mountains in Pembrokeshire, Wales. The parish includes the small settlement of Gwastad. A notable feature is Llys-y-frân Lake, a popular tourist attraction.

== Name ==
The name appears as Llys-y-frân on Ordnance Survey maps as well as in legislation, and the parish has been recorded with a number of spellings including Llysyfran, Llys-y-fran, Llys-y-Frân and Llys-y-Vrân. The word llys translates into English as "court" and y frân translates as "[of] the crow".

== History ==
The present parish church dates from the 12th century, with alterations and improvements in the ensuing centuries, and is dedicated to St Meilyr, a 6th-century Celtic saint. Llys-y-frân was originally a chapelry; in the 16th century it was controlled by various landowners in the district, but it does appear (Llisvrayne) as a parish on a 1578 map. One of the church's two bells is dated 1632. By 1833 it was the parish church. It is a Grade II listed building.

The parish was in the ancient Hundred of Dungleddy in the Diocese of St Davids. In 1833 the population was 202, and most of the parish was enclosed arable and pasture.

Llys-y-frân parish includes the hamlet of Gwastad, where there has been a Calvinistic Methodist chapel since 1836.

There may have been a timber castle north of the church, but the remains may have been destroyed when the reservoir dam was built. The site is known as Y Castell (The Castle).

In 1887 the parish extended to 1,466 acres (593 ha) and had a population of 194.

The teacher and composer William Penfro Rowlands (1860-1937) was born at Llys-y-frân.

There is no collective war memorial to the individuals from the area.

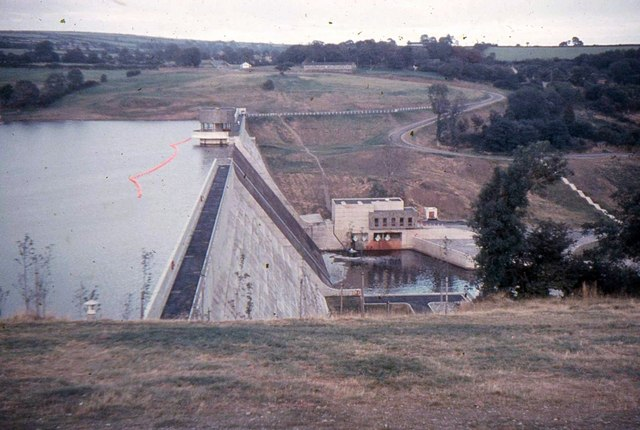
Llys-y-frân Reservoir Dam in 1972

Llys-y-Frân dam was constructed between 1968 and 1972 by Sir Lindsay Parkinson & Co. Ltd. The reservoir it impounds covers 212 acres (86 ha) and is surrounded by a grassland and woodland Country Park of 350 acres (140 ha), including the area of the reservoir. It is managed by Welsh Water and is one of 81 reservoirs in Wales. The dam is 100 feet (30 m) high and the lake is fed by the River Syfynwy (or Syfni) that also feeds Rosebush Reservoir a few miles upstream to the northeast.

In 2008, a refurbished hydro-electric scheme was completed, raising the power output to an average of 26 kW; the original turbine generated considerably less. In 2017 Welsh Water announced a £4 million investment to enhance the park's facilities, to be completed in 2019, but in 2019 the project was put on hold when the construction company went into administration. A new construction company was appointed, with work scheduled to be completed in 2020, until which time the park and reservoir would remain closed. The redevelopment project and outdoor activity centre opened in 2021.

== Llys-y-frân Lake amenities ==
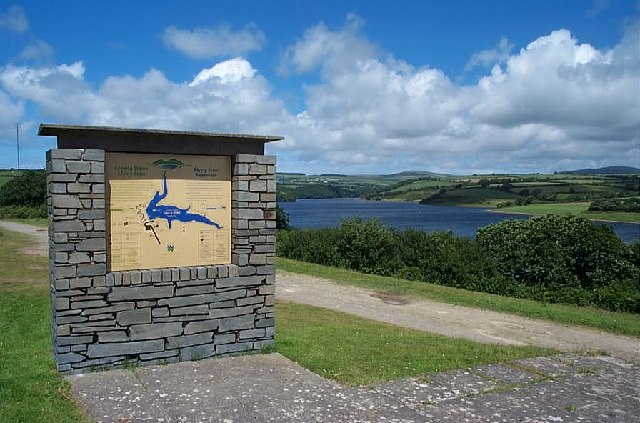
Reservoir and Country Park

The lake has a perimeter track 6.5 miles (10.5 km) long for walkers and cyclists. There is also a 1.5 miles (2.4 km) family trail, and cycle hire is available.

The reservoir is an important fishery in South West Wales, and has hosted national and international fishing competitions. Fishing with fly or bait, from mark or boat, is possible. The lake is stocked with rainbow and brown trout.

Sailing, windsurfing, rowing and canoeing all take place on the reservoir, with various equipment available for hire. The park hosted the Welsh Dragon Boat Championships in 2014, 2015, 2016 and 2017.

The Llys-y-frân Hillclimb is an annual event run by Swansea Motor Club.
