= Rice Morgan =

16th-century English politician

Rice (Rees, Rhys) Morgan (died 1577), of Nevern, Pembrokeshire, was a Welsh politician.

He was a member (MP) of the parliament of England for Haverfordwest in 1563.
