= Robert Needham (Haverfordwest MP) =

Sir Robert Needham was an English politician who sat in the House of Commons from 1645 to 1648.

Needham was the son of Thomas Needham of Pool Park and his wife Eleanor Bagenal, daughter of Sir Henry Bagenal and widow of Sir Robert Salisbury. He was knighted on 4 June 1630.

In September 1645, Needham was elected Member of Parliament for Haverfordwest. He was secluded from the Parliament in 1648 in Pride's Purge

Needham was married twice.

Parliament of England
Preceded by Sir John Stepney, 3rd Baronet	Member of Parliament for Haverfordwest; 1645–1648	Succeeded by Not represented in Rump Parliament
