= Haverfordwest (UK Parliament constituency) =

UK Parliament constituency (1545–1885)

- Former borough constituency for the House of Commons

1545–1885
- Seats: one
- Replaced by: Pembroke and Haverfordwest

Haverfordwest was a parliamentary constituency in Wales. It returned one Member of Parliament (MP) to the House of Commons of the Parliament of the United Kingdom, elected by the first past the post system.

== History ==
The constituency was enfranchised in 1545, as the second borough constituency in the historic county of Pembrokeshire. In the previous election of 1542, the first at which Wales is known to have sent members to the Parliament of England, this borough was one of the ancient boroughs contributing to the wages and being in some sense represented by the member for Pembroke. unlike most of the other Parliamentary districts, Haverfordwest was composed as a single member district, apparently in order to better maintain the conservative nature of the chamber.

During the eighteenth century, Haverfordwest was considered to be little more than a pocket borough for the Philipps family of Picton Castle. But unlike many "rotten boroughs", it was not disbanded in 1832.

From 1832 to 1885, it was a district of boroughs constituency, similar to those used in Scotland. It consisted of the three boroughs of Haverfordwest, Fishguard and Narberth.

The constituency was abolished for the 1885 general election, and merged into the newly created constituency of Pembroke and Haverfordwest.

== Members of Parliament ==
=== 1543–1660 ===
Parliament	Member
1547	Richard Howell
1553 (Mar)	Richard Howell
1553 (Oct)	Richard Taylor
1554 (Apr)	Richard Howell
1554 (Nov)	Richard Howell
1555	John Bolton or Button
1558	Thomas ab Owen
1559	Hugh Harris
1562–3	Rice Morgan
1571	John Garnons (Alban Stepneth cheated of seat by Sheriff)
1572	Alban Stepneth
1584	Alban Stepneth
1586	Alban Stepneth
1588	Sir John Perrot
1593	Sir Nicholas Clifford
1597	Sir James Perrot
1601	John Canon
1604-1611	Sir James Perrot
1614	Sir James Perrot
1621-22	Sir James Perrot
1624	Lewis Powell
1625	Sir Thomas Canon
1626	Sir James Perrot
1628	Sir James Perrot
1629–1640	No Parliaments summoned
1640 (Apr)	Hugh Owen
1640 (Nov)	Sir John Stepney, 3rd Baronet, disabled 1643
1645	Sir Robert Needham, secluded 1648
1653	Not represented in Barebone's Parliament
1654	Not represented in 1st Protectorate Parliament
1656	John Upton
1659	John Upton
1660	William Philipps

=== 1660–1885 ===
Election	Member	Party
1660 (Apr)	William Philipps, election declared void, June 1660	
1660 (Aug)	William Philipps re-elected	
1661	Isaac Lloyd, election declared void, May 1663	
1663 (c.Jun)	Sir William Morton, made judge	
1666	Sir Frederick Hyde, died	
1667	Sir Herbert Perrott	
1679	William Wogan	
1679	Thomas Owen	
1681	Thomas Howard	
1685	William Wogan	
1701 (Jan)	William Wheeler	
1702	John Laugharne, died	
1715	John Barlow, died	
1718	Sir John Philipps, 4th Baronet	
1722	Francis Edwardes, died	
1726	Sir Erasmus Philipps, died	
1743	George Barlow	
1747	William Edwardes (Baron Kensington from 1776)	
1780	William Edwardes (Baron Kensington from 1776)	Whig
1784	The Lord Milford	
1786	The Lord Kensington	Whig
1801	Seat vacant	
1802	The Lord Kensington	Whig
1818	William Henry Scourfield	Tory
1826	Richard Philipps	Whig
1835	William Henry Scourfield	Conservative
1837	Sir Richard Philipps, Bt	Whig
1847	John Evans	Whig
1852	John Scourfield	Conservative
1868	Hon. William Edwardes (Baron Kensington from 1872)	Liberal
Constituency seat abolished

== Election results ==
=== Elections in the 1830s ===
General election 1830: Haverfordwest
Party	Candidate	Votes	%
Whig	Richard Philipps	Unopposed	
Registered electors		c. 500	
Whig hold			

General election 1831: Haverfordwest
Party	Candidate	Votes	%
Whig	Richard Philipps	Unopposed	
Registered electors		c. 500	
Whig hold			

General election 1832: Haverfordwest
Party	Candidate	Votes	%
Whig	Richard Philipps	Unopposed	
Registered electors		723	
Whig hold			

General election 1835: Haverfordwest
Party	Candidate	Votes	%
Conservative	William Henry Scourfield	241	65.8
Whig	Jonathan Haworth Peel	125	34.2
Majority		116	31.6
Turnout		366	68.0
Registered electors		538	
Conservative gain from Whig			

General election 1837: Haverfordwest
Party	Candidate	Votes	%	±%
Whig	Richard Philipps	247	60.0	+25.8
Conservative	William Henry Scourfield	165	40.0	−25.8
Majority		82	20.0	N/A
Turnout		412	58.4	−9.6
Registered electors		706		
Whig gain from Conservative		Swing	+25.8	

=== Elections in the 1840s ===
General election 1841: Haverfordwest
Party	Candidate	Votes	%	±%
Whig	Richard Philipps	Unopposed		
Registered electors		667		
Whig hold				

General election 1847: Haverfordwest
Party	Candidate	Votes	%	±%
Whig	John Evans	Unopposed		
Registered electors		667		
Whig hold				

=== Elections in the 1850s ===
General election 1852: Haverfordwest
Party	Candidate	Votes	%	±%
Conservative	John Philipps	297	59.4	New
Whig	John Evans	203	40.6	N/A
Majority		94	18.8	N/A
Turnout		500	73.3	N/A
Registered electors		682		
Conservative gain from Whig		Swing	N/A	

General election 1857: Haverfordwest
Party	Candidate	Votes	%	±%
Conservative	John Philipps	258	50.2	−9.2
Radical	William Rees	256	49.8	+9.2
Majority		2	0.4	−18.4
Turnout		514	69.5	−3.8
Registered electors		740		
Conservative hold		Swing	−9.2	

General election 1859: Haverfordwest
Party	Candidate	Votes	%	±%
Conservative	John Philipps	Unopposed		
Registered electors		777		
Conservative hold				

=== Elections in the 1860s ===
General election 1865: Haverfordwest
Party	Candidate	Votes	%	±%
Conservative	John Scourfield	314	58.6	N/A
Liberal	William Edwardes	222	41.4	New
Majority		92	17.2	N/A
Turnout		536	80.1	N/A
Registered electors		669		
Conservative hold		Swing	N/A	

General election 1868: Haverfordwest
Party	Candidate	Votes	%	±%
Liberal	William Edwardes	638	56.2	+14.8
Conservative	Samuel Pitman	497	43.8	−14.8
Majority		141	12.4	N/A
Turnout		1,135	74.4	−5.7
Registered electors		1,526		
Liberal gain from Conservative		Swing	+14.8	

=== Elections in the 1870s ===
Edwardes was appointed a Groom in Waiting, requiring a by-election.

By-election, 26 Nov 1873: Haverfordwest
Party	Candidate	Votes	%	±%
Liberal	William Edwardes	609	52.2	−4.0
Conservative	Xavier de Castanos Royds Peel	558	47.8	+4.0
Majority		51	4.4	−8.0
Turnout		1,167	73.3	−1.1
Registered electors		1,592		
Liberal hold		Swing	−4.0	

General election 1874: Haverfordwest
Party	Candidate	Votes	%	±%
Liberal	William Edwardes	Unopposed		
Registered electors		1,357		
Liberal hold				

The election was declared void on petition, causing a by-election, after a separate potential candidate, Mr Davis, had been refused his nomination by the local sheriff without a deposit for security of costs. However, in the resulting by-election, Davis did not stand and Edwardes was re-elected.

By-election, 12 Jun 1874: Haverfordwest
Party	Candidate	Votes	%	±%
Liberal	William Edwardes	Unopposed		
Registered electors		1,357		
Liberal hold				

=== Elections in the 1880s ===
General election 1880: Haverfordwest
Party	Candidate	Votes	%	±%
Liberal	William Edwardes	686	56.8	N/A
Conservative	Edward Denman Thornburgh-Cropper	522	43.2	New
Majority		164	13.6	N/A
Turnout		1,208	78.3	N/A
Registered electors		1,543		
Liberal hold		Swing	N/A	

Edwardes was appointed Comptroller of the Household, requiring a by-election.

By-election, 12 May 1880: Haverfordwest
Party	Candidate	Votes	%	±%
Liberal	William Edwardes	Unopposed		
Liberal hold				

== Sources ==
- Williams, David (1960). "The Pembrokeshire Elections of 1831" (PDF). Welsh History Review. 1 (1): 37–64.
- Leigh Rayment's Historical List of MPs – Constituencies beginning with "H" (part 2)
