= New Moat =

Village, parish and community in Pembrokeshire, Wales

New Moat: Welsh: Y Mot
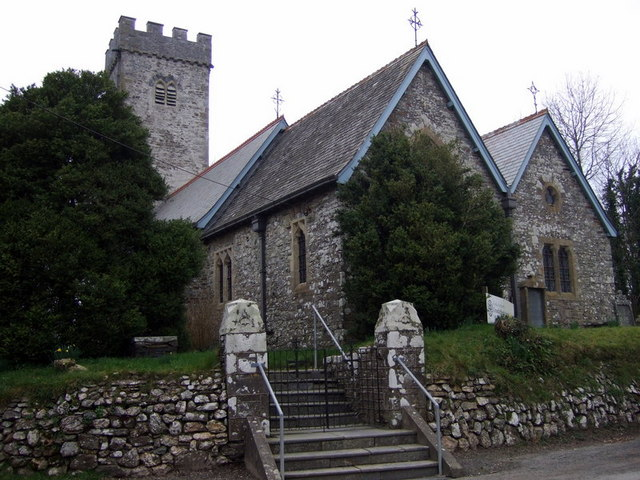
- St Nicholas's Church, New Moat

- Location within Pembrokeshire
- Population: 434 (2011)
- OS grid reference: SN064255
- Community: New Moat
- Principal area: Pembrokeshire
- Preserved county: Dyfed
- Country: Wales
- Sovereign state: United Kingdom
- Post town: Clarbeston Road
- Postcode district: SA63 4
- Police: Dyfed-Powys
- Fire: Mid and West Wales
- Ambulance: Welsh
- UK Parliament: Preseli Pembrokeshire
- Senedd Cymru – Welsh Parliament: Ceredigion Penfro
- List of places UK Wales Pembrokeshire 51.89°N 4.81°W Map of the community

New Moat (Welsh: Y Mot) is a village, parish and community in Pembrokeshire, Wales. It extends from the southern edges of Mynydd Preseli to the Pembrokeshire-Carmarthenshire border.

== Demographics ==
New Moat community includes the villages of New Moat, Bletherston, Llys y Fran, and Penffordd, with a combined population recorded in the 2001 census of 426, increasing to 434 at the 2011 Census.

== History ==
Historically in the hundred of Dungleddy, the village takes its name from an ancient motte and bailey defence of which only the artificially built mound now survives. The Black Book of St Davids 1326 records state that the Lord of New Moat paid one penny a year to the Bishops of St Davids at Castle Morris.

New Moat was once the seat of the Scourfield family, who are reported to have resided in the area since the reign of Edward I. The Scourfields provided the area of Pembrokeshire and Haverfordwest with several sheriffs and mayors, as well as Members of Parliament, including William Henry Scourfield and Sir John Scourfield. The family resided at Mote and Robertson Hall until the 19th century when the family moved to Robeston Hall in the parish of Robeston West. Mote and Robertson Hall became ruinous and has since been demolished.

== Church ==
At the centre of the village is St Nicholas's church, mainly rebuilt in the 1880s, which retains its medieval tower and 17th-century altar tomb and is a grade II* listed building.
