= William Edwardes, 4th Baron Kensington =

British landowner and Liberal politician (1835–1896)

The Right Honourable The Lord Kensington PC
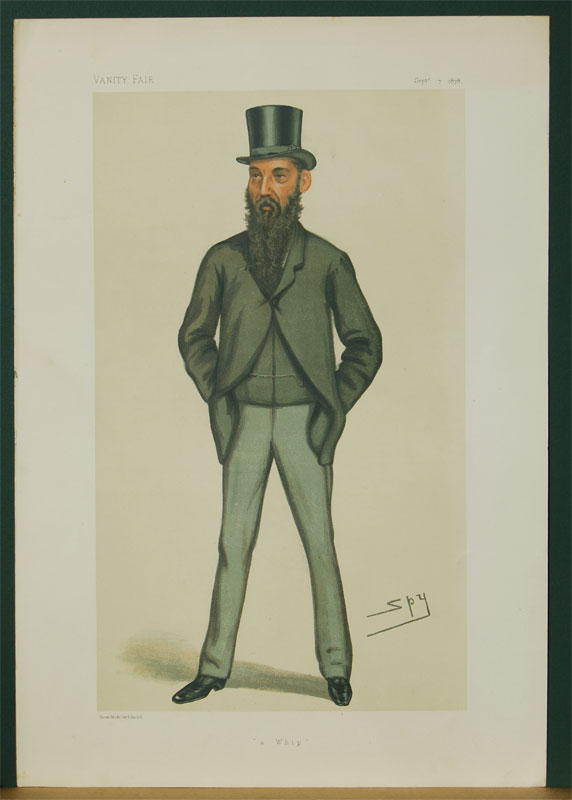
- "A Whip". Caricature of Lord Kensington by "Spy" (Leslie Ward) published in Vanity Fair in 1878.

Captain of the Yeomen of the Guard
- In office 25 August 1892 – 21 June 1895
- Monarch: Victoria
- Prime Minister: William Ewart Gladstone; The Earl of Rosebery
- Preceded by: The Earl of Limerick
- Succeeded by: The Earl of Limerick

Personal details
- Born: 11 May 1835
- Died: 7 October 1896 (aged 61)
- Party: Liberal
- Spouse(s): Grace Johnstone-Douglas (d. 1910)

William Edwardes, 4th Baron Kensington PC (11 May 1835 – 7 October 1896), also 1st Baron Kensington in the Peerage of the United Kingdom, styled The Honourable William Edwardes between 1852 and 1872, was a British landowner and Liberal politician. He notably served as Comptroller of the Household from 1880 to 1885 and as Captain of the Yeomen of the Guard from 1892 to 1895.

== Background ==
Edwardes was the eldest son of Captain William Edwardes, 3rd Baron Kensington, by his wife Laura Jane Ellison, daughter of Cuthbert Ellison, of Hebburn Hall, Hebburn, County Durham.

== Political career ==
Edwardes was elected to the House of Commons for Haverfordwest in 1868, a seat he held until 1885. In 1872 he succeeded his father as fourth Baron Kensington but as this was an Irish peerage it did not entitle him to a seat in the House of Lords and he was able to remain a member of the House of Commons. When the Liberals came to power in 1880 under William Ewart Gladstone, Kensington was admitted to the Privy Council and appointed Comptroller of the Household (government whip in the House of Commons), a post he held until the government fell in 1885.

Following the abolition of his Haverfordwest constituency in 1885, Kensington sought election for Hornsey, but was unsuccessful.

In 1886, he was created Baron Kensington, of Kensington in the County of Middlesex, in the Peerage of the United Kingdom, which gave him a seat in the House of Lords. The same year the Liberals returned to power under Gladstone, and Kensington served briefly as a Lord-in-waiting (government whip in the House of Lords) from March until the fall of the government in July. The Liberals were out of office for the next six years, but returned to power in 1892, when Gladstone appointed him Captain of the Yeomen of the Guard. He retained this office when Lord Rosebery became Prime Minister in 1894. The Liberal government fell the following year, and Kensington never returned to office. Apart from his political career he also held the honorary post of Lord Lieutenant of Pembrokeshire between 1872 and 1896.

== Local government ==
Kensington was elected to Pembrokeshire County Council at the first county elections in 1889. He presided at the first meeting of the council and was immediately elected an alderman.

== Family ==
Lord Kensington married Grace Elizabeth Johnstone-Douglas, daughter of Robert Johnstone-Douglas, in 1867. They had four sons and five daughters. He died in October 1896, aged 61, and was succeeded in the barony by his eldest son, William. Lady Kensington died in 1910.

== Death ==
Lord Kensington died suddenly on 7 October 1896 while taking part in a shooting expedition at Floors Castle, Roxburghshire, Scotland.

Parliament of the United Kingdom
Preceded by John Henry Scourfield	Member of Parliament for Haverfordwest; 1868–1885	Constituency abolished
Political offices
Preceded by Earl of Yarmouth	Comptroller of the Household; 1880–1885	Succeeded by Lord Arthur Hill
Preceded by The Earl of Limerick	Captain of the Yeomen of the Guard; 1892–1895	Succeeded by The Earl of Limerick
Party political offices
Preceded by The Viscount Oxenbridge	Liberal Chief Whip in the House of Lords; 1892–1896	Succeeded by The Lord Ribblesdale
Honorary titles
Preceded by The Lord Kensington	Lord Lieutenant of Pembrokeshire; 1872–1896	Succeeded by Viscount Emlyn
Peerage of the United Kingdom
New creation	Baron Kensington; 1886–1896; Member of the House of Lords (1886–1896)	Succeeded by William Edwardes
Peerage of Ireland
Preceded by William Edwardes	Baron Kensington; 1872–1896	Succeeded by William Edwardes
