= Hugh Owen =

Hugh Owen may refer to:

== Politicians ==
- Sir Hugh Owen, 1st Baronet (1604–1670), Member of Parliament (MP) for Pembroke, Haverfordwest and Pembrokeshire
- Hugh Owen (MP for Bossiney) (fl. 1563–1571), MP for Bossiney and Merioneth
- Sir Hugh Owen, 2nd Baronet (1641 creation) (1645–1699), MP for Pembrokeshire
- Sir Hugh Owen, 5th Baronet (1731–1786), MP for Pembrokeshire
- Sir Hugh Owen, 6th Baronet (1782–1809), MP for Pembroke
- Sir Hugh Owen Owen, 2nd Baronet (1803–1891), MP for Pembroke, 1826–1838, 1861–1868

== Others ==
- Hugh Owen (cricketer) (1859–1912), English cricketer
- Hugh Owen (educator) (1804–1881), Welsh educator
- Hugh Owen (minister) (1639/40–1700), Welsh independent minister
- Hugh Owen (photographer) (1808–1897), British photographer
- Hugh Owen (topographer) (1761–1827)

== See also ==
- Huw Owen (1926–1996), Welsh theologian, writer and academic
