= Sir Arthur Owen, 3rd Baronet =

Welsh aristocrat, politician, baronet

Sir Arthur Owen, 3rd Baronet (c. 1674–1753), of Orielton, Pembrokeshire, was a Welsh Whig politician who sat in the English and British House of Commons between 1695 and 1727.

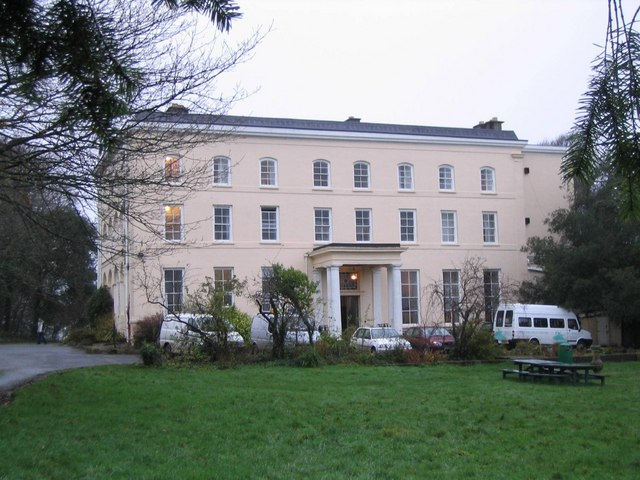
Orielton

== Early life ==
Owen was the eldest surviving son Sir Hugh Owen, 2nd Baronet of Orielton, Pembrokeshire and his wife Anne Owen, daughter of Henry Owen of Bodeon, Anglesey. By 1697, he married Emma Williams, daughter of Sir William Williams, 1st Baronet MP. He succeeded to the estate and baronetcy on the death of his father on 13 January 1699.

== Career ==
Owen's family controlled the parliamentary seat of Pembroke Boroughs and had a strong interest in Pembrokeshire. They were moderate and independent Whigs. At the 1695 English general election he was returned unopposed as Member of Parliament for Pembrokeshire in succession to his father. In 1697 Owen was Captain of the troop of Pembrokeshire Militia Horse. He was returned again at the 1698 English general election. His only contest was in the first election of 1701 when he won by 426 to 5 votes. He was returned unopposed again at the second general election of 1701, and at the 1702 English general election. He stood aside for his brother at the 1705 English general election and instead was Mayor of Pembroke in 1705, 1706 and 1707 in which period he increased the number of councilmen and burgesses. As a result he was returned unopposed as MP for Pembroke Boroughs at the 1708 British general election. He was a teller for the Whigs voted for the naturalization of the Palatines in 1709, and for the impeachment of Henry Sacheverell in 1710. At the 1710 British general election Owen stood for both Pembrokeshire, where he was defeated by the Tory John Barlow, and for Pembroke Boroughs, where he was victorious until unseated on petition on 23 February 1712.

In 1715 Owen was appointed Lord Lieutenant of Pembrokeshire and regained his seat as a Whig MP for Pembrokeshire at the 1715 general election. He was appointed Vice-Admiral of North Wales in 1716. He was returned at Pembrokeshire in 1722 but lost the seat at the 1727 general election and did not stand for Parliament again.

== Death and legacy ==
Owen died on 6 June 1753, and was buried at Monkton, Pembrokeshire. He and his wife had six sons and six daughters. He was succeeded by his son William who was also an MP. Another son John was also an MP.

Parliament of England
Preceded by Sir Hugh Owen, Bt	Member of Parliament for Pembrokeshire; 1695–1705	Succeeded by Wirriot Owen
Parliament of Great Britain
Preceded by John Meyrick	Member of Parliament for Pembroke Boroughs; 1708–1712	Succeeded by Lewis Wogan
Preceded by John Barlow	Member of Parliament for Pembrokeshire; 1715–1727	Succeeded by John Campbell
Baronetage of England
Preceded by Hugh Owen	Baronet (of Orielton); 1699-1753	Succeeded by William Owen
