= Owen baronets of Orielton (first creation, 1641) =

Escutcheon of the Owen baronets of Orielton

The Owen baronetcy, of Orielton in the County of Pembroke, was created in the Baronetage of England on 11 August 1641 for Hugh Owen, Member of Parliament for Pembroke, Haverfordwest and Pembrokeshire.

The 2nd, 3rd and 4th Baronets all represented Pembroke and Pembrokeshire in the House of Commons and the latter two also served as Lord-Lieutenant of Pembrokeshire. The 5th Baronet sat for Pembrokeshire and was Lord-Lieutenant of Pembrokeshire while the 6th Baronet represented Pembroke in Parliament. The 8th Baronet assumed the additional surname of Barlow. The title became extinct on his death in 1851.

== Owen baronets, of Orielton (1641) ==
- Sir Hugh Owen, 1st Baronet (died 1670)
- Sir Hugh Owen, 2nd Baronet (c. 1645–1699)
- Sir Arthur Owen, 3rd Baronet (c. 1674–1753)
- Sir William Owen, 4th Baronet (c. 1697–1781)
- Sir Hugh Owen, 5th Baronet (died 1786)
- Sir Hugh Owen, 6th Baronet (1782–1809)
- Sir Arthur Owen, 7th Baronet (c. 1740–1817)
- Sir William Owen-Barlow, 8th Baronet (1775–1851)
