= Maynea =

Scientific classification
- Kingdom: Animalia
- Phylum: Chordata
- Class: Actinopterygii
- Order: Perciformes
- Family: Zoarcidae
- Subfamily: Lycodinae
- Genus: Maynea; Cunningham, 1871
- Species: M. puncta

Binomial name
- Maynea puncta (Jenyns, 1842)

Synonyms
- Conger punctus Jenyns, 1842; Maynea patagonica Cunningham, 1871

Monospecific genus of marine ray-finned fish

Maynea is a monospecific genus of marine ray-finned fish belonging to the family Zoarcidae, the eelpouts. Its only species is Maynea puncta which is found in the Magellan Province of the southeastern Pacific Ocean and the southwestern Atlantic Ocean.

== Taxonomy ==
Maynea was first proposed as a monospecific genus in 1871 by the Scottish naturalist Robert Oliver Cunningham when he described Maynea patagonica, the type locality of this species being the Otter Islands, Smyth Channel in the Magellan Straits in southern Chile. In 1988 M. Eric Anderson confirmed that Maynea was a monospecific genus and that Cunningham's M. patagonica was a junior synonym of Conger puncta which had been described in 1842 by Leonard Jenyns from type specimens collected on the second voyage of HMS Beagle in the Beagle Channel in Tierra del Fuego. This taxon is classified in the subfamily Lycodinae, one of four subfamilies in the family Zoarcidae, the eelpouts.

== Etymology ==
Maynea, the genus name, honours Captain Richard Charles Mayne, commander of HMS Nassau on the survey expedition to the Straits of Magellan, 1866–9 on which holotype of M. patagonica was collected. The specific name puncta means "pierced" or "pricked", an allusion to the pores on the body which are densely studded on the body but not the head.

== Description ==
Maynea is distinguished by having 7 or 8 suborbital bones and 5 or 6 pores in the cephalic sensory canal. This taxon has a small gill slit and no pelvic fins. The lateral line and pyloric caecae are present as are vomerine and palatine teeth. The upper body is covered with scales. The flesh is firm. The teeth in the jaw are small and conical. This species attains a maximum published standard length of 28.2 cm (11.1 in).

== Habitat and distribution ==
Maynea is endemic to the Magellan Province in the southeastern Pacific and southwestern Atlantic Oceans where it occurs in the inlets of southern Chile, around Tierra del Fuego and the Falkland Islands. It has been observed from the intertidal zone and subtidal kelp forests down to depths of at least 101 m (331 ft).
