= Owen baronets of Orielton (second creation, 1813) =

Escutcheon of the Owen baronets of Orielton

The Owen baronetcy, of Orielton in the County of Pembroke, was created in the Baronetage of the United Kingdom on 12 January 1813 for John Owen, Member of Parliament for Pembroke and Lord-Lieutenant of Pembrokeshire. Born John Lord, he was the son of Joseph Lord and his wife Corbetta, daughter of Lieutenant-General John Owen, second son of the 3rd Baronet of the first creation, and assumed the surname of Owen in lieu of his patronymic in 1809 on inheriting the estates of the 6th Baronet of the first creation.

The 2nd Baronet represented Pembroke in the House of Commons as a Liberal. The title became extinct on the death in 2002 of the 5th Baronet, who left no heir.

== Owen baronets, of Orielton (1813) ==
- Sir John Lord Owen, 1st Baronet (1776–1861)
- Sir Hugh Owen Owen, 2nd Baronet (1803–1891)
- Sir Hugh Charles Owen, 3rd Baronet (1826–1909)
- Sir John Arthur Owen, 4th Baronet (1892–1973)
- Sir Hugh Bernard Pilkington Owen, 5th Baronet (1915–2002)

== Notes ==
Baronetage of the United Kingdom
Preceded by Nagle baronets	Owen baronets of Orielton; 12 January 1813	Succeeded by Sheaffe baronets
