= Great Nash =

House in Pembrokeshire, Wales

Coordinates: 51.7536°N 4.9338°W

Great Nash was an important gentry house at Llangwm, Pembrokeshire, Wales.

The house was occupied by the Nash family in the 15th and 16th Century. An heiress married Alban Philipps, a younger son of the Picton Castle family, and by 1670 it was occupied by one of the Corbetts of Ynysmaengwyn, Merionethshire. Dorothy Corbett married a son of Sir Hugh Owen, 2nd Bt MP of Orielton, Pembrokeshire before 1704. Their son Wyrriott Owen died in 1773 and his son Hugh MP died 1809. The house was replaced by the present farmhouse in the 18th century and by 1811 the house was ruined and the woods cut down. It was described by Fenton as having been fashionable for its date, a sort of cube. The remaining dovecote, of uncertain date but possibly late medieval or 16th Century, is a listed building.
