= Louis Watkins =

Louis Watkins may refer to:

- Louis Douglas Watkins (c. 1835–1868), soldier in the Union Army during the American Civil War
- J. Louis Watkins Jr. (1929–1997), American judge in Louisiana

== See also ==
- Lewis Watkins (disambiguation)
