= Henry Adams (MP) =

16th-century Welsh politician

- Born: 1532
- Died: 1611 (aged 78–79)
- Occupation: politician

Henry Adams (by 1532 – 1611 (Note: Birth date based on the assumption he was of age at the election)), of Peterchurch in Pembroke, was a Welsh politician.

== Family ==
Adams was a son of John Adams of Peterchurch and Catherine, daughter of Thomas ap Dafydd. Adams married Anne née Wogan, daughter of Richard Wogan of Boulston, Pembrokeshire. They had two sons including the MP Nicholas Adams, and two daughters.

== Career ==
He was a member of parliament (MP) in the Parliament of England for Pembroke Boroughs from March to October 1553.
