= Arthur Owen (1647–1702) =

Welsh politician (1647–1702)

Arthur Owen (1647 – c. 1702) was a Welsh politician. He sat as MP for Pembroke Boroughs from March 1679 to 1695.

== Life ==
He was baptised on 18 July 1647 and was the fourth but second surviving son of Sir Hugh Owen, 1st Baronet, the second son by his second wife and the brother of Sir Hugh Owen, 2nd Baronet. Circa. 1668, he married Elizabeth, the daughter of John Horsey. She was buried on 4 August 1681 and on 8 January 1684, he married Mary, the daughter of Morgan Powell and they had one son and one daughter.
