= Hensleigh =

Disambiguation

Hensleigh may refer to

== Surname ==
- Jonathan Hensleigh (born 1959), American screenwriter and film director

== Given name ==
- John Hensleigh Allen (1769–1843), British politician
- Hensleigh Wedgwood (1803–1891), British etymologist and philologist
