= Sir Hugh Owen, 1st Baronet =

English politician

Sir Hugh Owen, 1st Baronet (4 May 1604 – October 1670) was a Welsh politician who sat in the House of Commons variously between 1626 and 1660. He sided originally with the Parliamentarian side in the English Civil War, but the strength of his allegiance was in doubt.

Owen was the son of John Owen of Orielton, Pembrokeshire and his wife Dorothy Laugharne, daughter of John Laugharne of St Brides, and sister of Rowland Laugharne. He was educated at Lincoln's Inn (1622).

He sat on the Pembrokeshire bench as a Justice of the Peace from 1629 to 1643 and from 1656 until his death and was also a JP for Anglesey from 1637 to 1643, 1649 to 1653 and 1656 until his death. He was appointed High Sheriff of Pembrokeshire for 1633–34, 1653–54, 1663–44, Custos Rotulorum of Anglesey for 1642–43 and Deputy Lieutenant for Pembrokeshire from 1637 to at least 1642 and again in 1661.

Owen was elected Member of Parliament for Pembroke Boroughs in 1626 and again in 1628, sitting until 1629 when King Charles decided to rule without parliament for eleven years. In April 1640, Owen was elected MP for Haverfordwest in the Short Parliament. In November 1640 he was elected MP for Pembroke again for the Long Parliament. He was created baronet of Orielton in the County of Pembroke on 11 August 1641.

At the beginning of the Civil War, Owen supported the Parliamentary cause with his cousin Rowland and John Poyer at Pembroke. In February 1644, he was imprisoned by Sir Henry Vaughan after the Royalist defeat at Pill, Milford Haven. He then changed sides and joined the king at Oxford, abandoning Pembrokeshire for Anglesey when the cause was lost. However he remained in parliament until 1648. After the restoration of the monarchy he was again re-elected MP for Pembroke for the Convention Parliament in March 1660.

Owen married firstly Frances Philipps, daughter of Sir John Philipps, 1st Baronet of Picton Castle, and secondly Catherine Lloyd, daughter of Sir Evan Lloyd of Yale, Denbighshire. His fourth son, Arthur Owen (1647–1702) also sat as MP for Pembroke from March 1679 to 1695.

Parliament of England
Preceded by Lewis Powell	Member of Parliament for Pembroke; 1626–1629	Parliament suspended until 1640
Vacant Parliament suspended since 1629	Member of Parliament for Haverfordwest; 1640	Succeeded by John Stepney
Preceded by John Stepney	Member of Parliament for Pembroke; 1640–1648	Not represented in Rump Parliament
Vacant Not represented in Rump Parliament	Member of Parliament for Pembroke; 1660	Succeeded by Rowland Laugharne
Baronetage of England
New creation	Baronet (of Orielton); 1641–1670	Succeeded by Hugh Owen
