= Charles Francis Egerton Allen =

Biritsh politician (1847–1927)

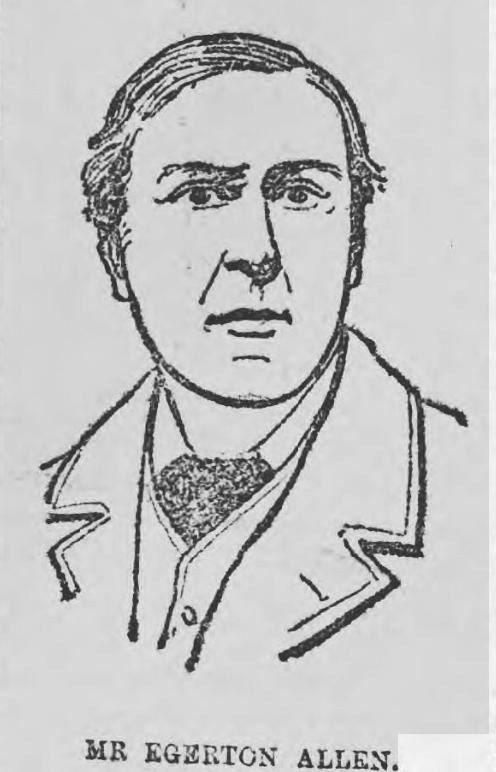
- 1895 illustration of Allen from the South Wales Daily News

Member of Parliament for Pembroke and Haverfordwest
- In office 1892 – 1895
- Monarch: Victoria
- Prime Minister: William Ewart Gladstone; The Earl of Rosebery
- Preceded by: Richard Mayne
- Succeeded by: John Laurie

Personal details
- Born: 14 October 1847 Agra, North-Western Provinces, British India
- Died: 31 December 1927 (aged 80) Tenby, Pembrokeshire, Wales
- Party: Liberal
- Spouse: Elizabeth Georgina (m. 1891)
- Education: Eton College
- Alma mater: St John's College, Cambridge (B.A.)
- Occupation: Colonial administrator, barrister

Charles Francis Egerton Allen (14 October 1847 – 31 December 1927) was a British administrator in India who later served as Member of Parliament for Pembroke and Haverfordwest from 1892 until 1895.

== Personal life ==
Allen was born in Agra, India, in 1847, where his father, Charles Allen, served in the Indian Civil Service. His paternal grandmother was Mary Anne Harriet, daughter of Peter Bartholomew Jullian of London. His uncle James was Dean of St Davids Cathedral.

He was educated at Eton College and St John's College, Cambridge, where he graduated BA in 1870.

He married Elizabeth Georgina, daughter of William Wilcox of Whitburn, County Durham, in 1891 she died in 1934. There were no children from the marriage. He died at his home in 10 Norton, Tenby.

== Career ==
Allen was called to the Bar in the Middle Temple in 1871 and worked as a Barrister in the North Eastern Circuit before moving back to India in 1873 where he worked as a barrister in Calcutta and Rangoon and as a minor court judge in Calcutta cases, he was the Governor's Advocate in Rangoon and the Registrar of Rangoon. He also lectured in Law at Calcutta Presidency College. He left Burma in 1888 and returned to the United Kingdom via China and Japan after spending to winters in Switzerland on medical advice. Upon his return from India, he settled at Tenby.

He served as a justice of the peace for Pembrokeshire from 1895 to 1906.

=== Member of Parliament ===
He stood as the Liberal candidate for the Pembroke and Haverfordwest constituency in the 1892 general election, winning the seat from the Conservative Party. He lost the seat in the 1895 general election when he was defeated by the Conservative candidate.
