= Francis de Rottenburg =

Prussian military officer (1757–1832)

Lieutenant-General Baron de Rottenburg KCH

Lieutenant Governor of Upper Canada
- In office 1813–1813
- Monarch: George III
- Governor General: George Prevost
- Preceded by: Roger Hale Sheaffe
- Succeeded by: Gordon Drummond

Personal details
- Born: Franz von Rottenburg; 4 November 1757 Danzig, Polish–Lithuanian Commonwealth
- Died: 24 April 1832 (aged 74) Portsmouth, England

Military service
- Allegiance: Kingdom of France; Kingdom of Prussia; United Kingdom
- Branch/service: French Army; Prussian Army; British Army
- Commands: Upper Canada
- Battles/wars: French Revolutionary Wars; Irish Rebellion of 1798; Walcheren Campaign; War of 1812

Lieutenant-General Sir Francis de Rottenburg, Baron de Rottenburg (4 November 1757 – 24 April 1832) was a military officer and colonial administrator who served in the armies of the Kingdom of France and later the United Kingdom.

== Early life and service ==
Franz von Rottenburg was born in Danzig, Polish–Lithuanian Commonwealth on 4 November 1757, the son of Franz Gottlieb von Rottenburg (2 April 1725 – 2 March 1799) and Anna Maria Brunati (20 April 1739 – 15 October 1799). He served in the French Royal Army, under the name de Rottenburg rather than von Rottenburg, from March 1782 to September 1791, his service ending during the early years of the French Revolution, then returning to Danzig and commanding a battalion of infantry in Tadeusz Kościuszko's uprising.

In December 1795, de Rottenburg joined the British Army, serving in Hompesch's Hussars, a unit of foreign-born troops. In 1796 he helped to establish Hompesch's Light Infantry, which later became part of the 5th Battalion of the 60th Regiment of Foot. This battalion was formed mainly from German émigrés. De Rottenburg rose to the rank of lieutenant-colonel in the unit, and commanded it during the Irish Rebellion of 1798 and the capture of Suriname in 1799.

De Rottenburg wrote a series of manuals (initially in German) which became the basis for the training of riflemen and light infantry under Sir John Moore. He later commanded a brigade of light troops in the Walcheren Campaign.

== Service in North America ==
De Rottenburg was promoted to major-general on the staff in British North America and arrived in Canada in 1810. When the War of 1812 with the United States broke out, he assumed command of the Montreal district. He assumed responsibility for both the civil and military leadership of Lower Canada on two occasions during the absence of Sir George Prevost, the commander in chief.

In 1813, he succeeded Major-General Sir Roger Hale Sheaffe as military and civil commander in Upper Canada. He was accused of neglecting civil duties and of being unduly cautious in his military decisions. He refused to send reinforcements to Major-General Henry Procter, commanding on the Detroit frontier, and this ultimately led to the British defeats at the Battle of Lake Erie and the Battle of Moraviantown. He later imposed martial law in the Eastern and Johnstown districts to force farmers to sell supplies to the army, an unpopular move which his successor repealed but was nevertheless forced to reimpose upon all of Upper Canada.

In December 1813, de Rottenburg was succeeded by Lieutenant-General Sir Gordon Drummond, and returned to his previous posts in Lower Canada. Later in 1814, substantial British reinforcements arrived in Canada. Sir George Prevost prepared to invade the United States by way of Lake Champlain. He placed de Rottenburg in command of a division of three brigades (led by Major-Generals Manley Power, Thomas Brisbane and Frederick Philipse Robinson). However, Prevost personally led the campaign, which was defeated at the Battle of Plattsburgh. Prevost, de Rottenburg and their staffs were criticised by the three brigade commanders, all of whom had seen much action in the Peninsular War, for their lack of fortitude at Plattsburgh.

== Later life ==
De Rottenburg was recalled to Britain in December 1814 and left Quebec in July 1815. He was appointed Knight Commander of the Royal Guelphic Order in 1817 and Knight Bachelor on 12 February 1818. He was promoted to lieutenant-general on 12 August 1819. He died in Portsmouth on 24 April 1832.

== Family ==
De Rottenburg had married Juliana Wilhelmina Carolina von Orelli, the daughter of Johann Ulrich von Orelli, a Neapolitan general, in Bratislava on 4 January 1802. They had one son and one daughter:

- George Frederick de Rottenburg, a British Army officer who arrived in Canada in the 1830s and served as a militia officer in Upper Canada, before leaving the country in 1852
- Frances de Rottenburg (d. 6 May 1875), who married Lord William Paget in 1827, and had issue

Government offices
Preceded by Sir Roger Hale Sheaffe	Lieutenant Governor of Upper Canada; 1813	Succeeded by Sir Gordon Drummond
