= Thomas Meyrick =

British politician (1837–1921)

Member of the British Parliament for Pembroke
- In office 1868–1874

Personal details
- Born: 14 March 1837
- Died: 30 July 1921 (aged 84)
- Party: Conservative

Military service
- Branch/service: British Army
- Rank: lieutenant-colonel

Sir Thomas Charlton Meyrick, 1st Baronet KCB (14 March 1837 – 30 July 1921), known as Thomas Charlton until 1858, was a Welsh Conservative member of parliament.

== Biography ==
Born Thomas Charlton, he was the son of St John Chiverton Charlton. He assumed by Royal licence the surname of Meyrick (which was that of his maternal grandfather Thomas Meyrick) in lieu of his patronymic in 1858. He was returned to Parliament for Pembroke in 1868, a seat he held until 1874.

In 1880 he was created a Baronet, of Bush House in the Parish of St Mary in the County of Pembroke and of Apley Castle in the parish of Wellington in the County of Salop. Mayrick served in the army, and became a lieutenant-colonel. After he had retired from the regular army, he was on 19 March 1902 appointed Honorary colonel of the 3rd (Militia) Battalion the King's (Shropshire Light Infantry).

Meyrick was appointed a Companion of the Order of the Bath (CB) in 1898, and was promoted to Knight Commander (KCB) in 1910.

== Family ==
Meyrick married Mary Rhoda, daughter of Richard Frederick Hill, in 1860. He died in July 1921, aged 84, and was succeeded in the baronetcy by his eldest son Frederick, himself a major in the army who commanded the first regiment of the Imperial Yeomanry, formed in 1900.

== Notes ==
Parliament of the United Kingdom
| Preceded by Sir Hugh Owen | Member of Parliament for Pembroke; 1868–1874 | Succeeded by Edward Reed |
Baronetage of the United Kingdom
| New creation | Baronet (of Bush); 1880–1921 | Succeeded by Frederick Charlton Meyrick |
