= Lewis Watkins (MP) =

16th-century Welsh politician

Lewis Watkins (ap Gwatkyn, Gwatkyn) (by 1511 – 1547/48), of Llangorse, Breconshire and Upton, Pembrokeshire, was a Welsh politician.

== Family ==
Watkins married Elizabeth (or Isabella) Tame, a daughter of Sir Edmund Tame. Together they had three sons, possibly including fellow Pembroke MP, William Watkin, and two daughters.

== Career ==
He was a Member (MP) of the Parliament of England for Pembroke Boroughs in 1545.

Parliament of England
Preceded by John Adams	Member of Parliament for Pembroke; 1545	Succeeded by John Harington
