= Richard Cuny =

Welsh soldier and politician

Richard Cuney
- Died: bef. 24 October 1627
- Occupations: politician, soldier
- Known for: Member of Parliament for Pembroke (1604–1611)

Richard Cuney or Cuny (died bef. 24 October 1627) was a Welsh politician who sat in the House of Commons from 1604 to 1611.

He was the son of Walter Cuny of Lamphey, Pembrokeshire. As a soldier he was a captain of Foot in the Lisbon expedition of 1589, the Normandy campaign of 1591, in Guernsey in 1593 and in Ireland in 1595, 1597. He was a lieutenant colonel on the Cadiz expedition of 1596 and a full colonel and serjeant-major of the army in Ireland in 1598.

In 1604, he was elected Member of Parliament for Pembroke. He was appointed High Sheriff of Pembrokeshire for 1614–15.

He married twice: firstly Anne, the daughter of Matthew Cradock of Stafford, with whom he had a daughter and secondly Jane, the daughter of Morgan Powell, merchant, of Greenhill, Pembrokeshire, with whom he had a son and 6 daughters. His son was captain Walter Cuney, a Parliamentary officer under Colonel Rowland Laugharne in Pembrokeshire in 1643.

Parliament of England
Preceded by John Lougher	Member of Parliament for Pembroke; 1604–1611	Succeeded by Sir Walter Devereux
