= Pembroke (UK Parliament constituency) =

UK Parliament constituency (1542–1885)

- Former borough constituency for the House of Commons

1542–1885
- Seats: one
- Replaced by: Pembroke and Haverfordwest

Pembroke (or Pembroke Boroughs) was a parliamentary constituency centred on the town of Pembroke in West Wales. It returned one Member of Parliament (MP) to the House of Commons of England until 1707, Great Britain until 1800 and from 1801 the Parliament of the United Kingdom, elected by the first past the post system.

== History ==
For the creation and early history of the seat, see the Boundaries section below.

The constituency was abolished by the Redistribution of Seats Act 1885 for the 1885 general election, when it was replaced by the new Pembroke and Haverfordwest constituency.

For much of the eighteenth and nineteenth centuries the constituency was dominated by the Owen family of Orielton, the last of whom, Sir Hugh Owen, was defeated at the 1868 general election.

== Boundaries ==
From its first known general election in 1542 until 1885, the constituency consisted of a number of boroughs within the historic county of Pembrokeshire in Wales.

=== Pembroke 1535–1832 ===
On the basis of information from several volumes of the History of Parliament, it is apparent that the history of the borough representation from Wales and Monmouthshire is more complicated than that of the English boroughs.

The Laws in Wales Act 1535 (26 Hen. 8. c. 26) provided for a single borough seat for each of 11 of the 12 Welsh counties and Monmouthshire. The legislation was ambiguous as to which communities were enfranchised. The county towns were awarded a seat, but this in some fashion represented all the ancient boroughs of the county, as the other boroughs were required to contribute to the member's wages. It was not clear if the burgesses of the contributing boroughs could take part in the election. The only election under the original scheme was for the 1542 parliament. It seems that only burgesses from the county towns actually took part. The Parliament Act 1543 (35 Hen. 8. c. 11) confirmed that the contributing boroughs could send representatives to take part in the election at the county town. As far as can be told from surviving indentures of returns, the degree to which the "out boroughs" participated varied, but by the end of the sixteenth century all the seats had some participation from them, at some elections at least.

The original scheme was modified by later legislation and decisions of the House of Commons (which were sometimes made with no regard to precedent or evidence: for example in 1728 it was decided that only the freemen of the borough of Montgomery could participate in the election for that seat, thus disenfranchising the freemen of Llanidloes, Welshpool and Llanfyllin).

In the case of Pembrokeshire, the number of boroughs involved gradually decreased. The county town was Pembroke. The out boroughs which continued to participate were Tenby and Wiston. Haverfordwest was involved in 1542 only, as it became a separate constituency in 1545. Narberth, New Moat, and Templeton had dropped out by 1558. Newport, Cilgerran, and Llawhaden ceased to participate between 1603 and 1690.

In 1690–1832 the freemen of the three remaining boroughs of Pembroke, Tenby, and Wiston were entitled to vote. There was a dispute in 1702–1712 about the right of the Wiston freemen to vote. The Whig family of Owen of Orielton, which had the dominant influence in Pembroke, had the Pembroke Corporation bar the participation of the Wiston men (who were influenced by the Tory Wogan family). In 1712 Parliament upheld the rights of the freemen of Wiston.

There were 331 electors in 1710 (including non-resident freemen). The electorate increased to about 500 in the 1754–1790 period.

=== Pembroke Boroughs 1832–1885 ===
This was a district of boroughs constituency, which grouped a number of parliamentary boroughs in Pembrokeshire into one single member constituency. The voters from each participating borough cast ballots, which were added together over the whole district to decide the result of the poll. In addition to the ancient right freemen voters, who retained the franchise after 1832, there was a new householder franchise applicable to all boroughs. The enfranchised communities in this district, from 1832, were the four boroughs of Pembroke, Milford, Tenby, and Wiston.

== Members of Parliament ==
The Roman numerals after some names are to distinguish different members for this constituency, with the same name. It is not suggested this use of Roman numerals was applied at the time.

=== MPs in the Parliament of England 1542–1707 ===
As there were sometimes significant gaps between Parliaments held in this period, the dates of first assembly and dissolution are given. Where the name of the member has not yet been ascertained or (before 1558) is not recorded in a surviving document, unknown is entered in the table.

Elected	Assembled	Dissolved	Member	Note
1542	16 January 1542	28 March 1544	John Adams	
1545	23 November 1545	31 January 1547	Lewis Watkins	
1547	4 November 1547	15 April 1552	John Harington II	
1553	1 March 1553	31 March 1553	Henry Adams	
1553	5 October 1553	5 December 1553	Henry Adams	
1554	2 April 1554	3 May 1554	John Herle	
1554	12 November 1554	16 January 1555	John Garnons	
1555	21 October 1555	9 December 1555	Richard Philipps	
1558	20 January 1558	17 November 1558	William Watkin	
1559	23 January 1559	8 May 1559	Henry Dodds	
1562 or 1563	11 January 1563	2 January 1567	William Revell	
1571	2 April 1571	29 May 1571	Robert Davy	
1572	8 May 1572	19 April 1583	Robert Lougher	
1584	23 November 1584	14 September 1585	John Vaughan III	
1586	13 October 1586	23 March 1587	John Vaughan III	
1588	4 February 1589	29 March 1589	Nicholas Adams	
1593	18 February 1593	10 April 1593	Sir Conyers Clifford	
1597	24 October 1597	9 February 1598	Edward Burton	
1601	27 October 1601	19 December 1601	John Lougher	
1604	19 March 1604	9 February 1611	Richard Cuney	
1614	5 April 1614	7 June 1614	Sir Walter Devereux	
1620 or 1621	16 January 1621	8 February 1622	Lewis Powell	
1623 or 1624	12 February 1624	27 March 1625	Sir Walter Devereux	
1625	17 May 1625	12 August 1625	Lewis Powell	
1626	6 February 1626	15 June 1626	Hugh Owen	
1628	17 March 1628	10 March 1629	Hugh Owen	
1640	13 April 1640	5 May 1640	Sir John Stepney, 3rd Baronet	
1640	3 November 1640	5 December 1648	Sir Hugh Owen, 1st Baronet (Note: Excluded in Pride's Purge)	Parliamentarian
—	6 December 1648 (Note: Date of Pride's Purge, which converted the Long Parliament into the Rump Parliament.)	20 April 1653 (Note: Date when Oliver Cromwell dissolved the Rump Parliament by force.)	vacant	
1653 (Note: Date when the members of the nominated or Barebones Parliament were selected. Pembroke was not represented in this body.)	4 July 1653	12 December 1653	unrepresented	
1654 (Note: Date when the members of the First Protectorate Parliament were elected. Pembroke was not represented in this body. Pembroke formed part of the county constituency of Pembrokeshire for this Parliament.)	3 September 1654	22 January 1655	unrepresented	
1656 (Note: Date when the members of the Second Protectorate Parliament were elected. Pembroke was not represented in this body. Pembroke formed part of the county constituency of Pembrokeshire for this Parliament.)	17 September 1656	4 February 1658	unrepresented	
1658 or 1659	27 January 1659	22 April 1659	Sampson Lort; Arthur Owen	
N/A (Note: The Rump Parliament was recalled and subsequently Pride's Purge was reversed, allowing the full Long Parliament to meet until it agreed to dissolve itself.)	7 May 1659	20 February 1660	vacant	
N/A	21 February 1660	16 March 1660	vacant	
c. April 1660	25 April 1660	29 December 1660	Sir Hugh Owen, 1st Baronet	
22 April 1661	8 May 1661	24 January 1679	Rowland Laugharne	Died 16 November 1675
2 October 1676	8 May 1661	24 January 1679	Sir Hugh Owen, 2nd Baronet	By-election
3 March 1679	6 March 1679	12 July 1679	Arthur Owen	
1679	21 October 1680	18 January 1681	Arthur Owen	
1681	21 March 1681	28 March 1681	Arthur Owen	
1685	19 May 1685	2 June 1687	Arthur Owen	
1689	22 January 1689	6 February 1690	Arthur Owen	
1690	20 March 1690	11 October 1695	Arthur Owen	
1695	22 November 1695	6 July 1698	Arthur Owen	Ceased to be MP
30 December 1695	22 November 1695	6 July 1698	Sir John Philipps, 4th Baronet	By-election
1698	24 August 1698	19 December 1700	Sir John Philipps, 4th Baronet	
16 January 1701	6 February 1701	11 November 1701	Sir John Philipps, 4th Baronet	
1 December 1701	30 December 1701	2 July 1702	Sir John Philipps, 4th Baronet	
24 July 1702	20 August 1702	5 April 1705	John Meyrick	Tory
21 May 1705	14 June 1705	1707 (Note: The MPs of the last Parliament of England and 45 members co-opted from the former Parliament of Scotland, became the House of Commons of the 1st Parliament of Great Britain which assembled on 23 October 1707 (see below for the members in that Parliament).)	John Meyrick	Tory

=== MPs 1707–1885 ===
Election	Member	Party	Note
1707, 23 October	John Meyrick	Tory	Co-opted, not elected, to the Parliament of Great Britain
1708, 17 May	Sir Arthur Owen, Bt [II]	Whig	Unseated, on petition, 23 February 1712
1712, 23 February	Lewis Wogan	Tory	Declared duly elected on petition; died 28 November 1714
1715, 14 February	Thomas Ferrers	Whig	
1722, 27 November	William Owen		By-election; 1747: Chose to sit for Pembrokeshire
1747, 21 December	Hugh Barlow [I]		By-election
1761, 2 April	Sir William Owen, Bt		
1774, 14 October	Hugh Owen [III] (later Hugh Barlow [II])	Whig	Changed name 1789; died 23 January 1809
1809, 9 February	Sir Hugh Owen, 6th Bt [IV]	Tory	By-election; died 8 August 1809
1809, 13 September	John Owen	Tory	By-election; 1812: Chose to sit for Pembrokeshire
1813, 19 March	Sir Thomas Picton	Whig	By-election; died in action, at the Battle of Waterloo
1815, 3 July	John Jones	Tory	By-election
1818, 19 June	John Hensleigh Allen	Whig	
1826, 13 June	Hugh Owen Owen	Tory	Re-elected as a Conservative candidate
1834	Hugh Owen Owen	Conservative	
1838, 20 February	Sir James Graham, Bt	Conservative	By-election
1841, 3 July	Sir John Owen, Bt	Conservative	
1846	Sir John Owen, Bt	Peelite	
1859	Sir John Owen, Bt	Liberal	
1861, 22 February	Sir Hugh Owen, Bt	Liberal	By-election
1868, 18 November	Thomas Meyrick	Conservative	
1874, 12 February	Edward Reed	Liberal	
1880, 7 April	Henry George Allen	Liberal	
1885	constituency abolished: see Pembroke & Haverfordwest		

== Elections ==
=== Elections in the 1830s ===
General election 1830: Pembroke
Party	Candidate	Votes	%
Tory	Hugh Owen Owen	Unopposed	
Tory hold			

General election 1831: Pembroke
Party	Candidate	Votes	%
Tory	Hugh Owen Owen	Unopposed	
Registered electors		c. 1,400	
Tory hold			

General election 1832: Pembroke
Party	Candidate	Votes	%
Tory	Hugh Owen Owen	Unopposed	
Registered electors		1,208	
Tory hold			

General election 1835: Pembroke
Party	Candidate	Votes	%
Conservative	Hugh Owen Owen	Unopposed	
Registered electors		1,168	
Conservative hold			

General election 1837: Pembroke
Party	Candidate	Votes	%
Conservative	Hugh Owen Owen	Unopposed	
Registered electors		1,152	
Conservative hold			

Owen resigned, causing a by-election.

By-election, 20 February 1838: Pembroke
Party	Candidate	Votes	%
Conservative	James Graham	Unopposed	
Conservative hold			

=== Elections in the 1840s ===
General election 1841: Pembroke
Party	Candidate	Votes	%	±%
Conservative	John Owen	282	50.3	N/A
Conservative	Hugh Owen Owen	184	32.8	N/A
Radical	James Mark Child	95	16.9	New
Majority		98	17.5	N/A
Turnout		561	49.5	N/A
Registered electors		1,134		
Conservative hold		Swing	N/A	

General election 1847: Pembroke
Party	Candidate	Votes	%	±%
Peelite	John Owen	Unopposed		
Registered electors		952		
Peelite gain from Conservative				

=== Elections in the 1850s ===
General election 1852: Pembroke
Party	Candidate	Votes	%	±%
Peelite	John Owen	Unopposed		
Registered electors		951		
Peelite hold				

General election 1857: Pembroke
Party	Candidate	Votes	%	±%
Peelite	John Owen	Unopposed		
Registered electors		810		
Peelite hold				

General election 1859: Pembroke
Party	Candidate	Votes	%	±%
Liberal	John Owen	Unopposed		
Registered electors		914		
Liberal hold				

=== Elections in the 1860s ===
Owen's death caused a by-election.

By-election, 22 February 1861: Pembroke
Party	Candidate	Votes	%	±%
Liberal	Hugh Owen Owen	342	57.1	N/A
Conservative	Thomas Meyrick	257	42.9	New
Majority		85	14.2	N/A
Turnout		599	66.9	N/A
Registered electors		896		
Liberal hold		Swing	N/A	

General election 1865: Pembroke
Party	Candidate	Votes	%	±%
Liberal	Hugh Owen Owen	668	68.7	N/A
Conservative	Benjamin Hardwicke	304	31.3	N/A
Majority		364	37.4	N/A
Turnout		972	67.8	N/A
Registered electors		1,433		
Liberal hold		Swing	N/A	

General election 1868: Pembroke
Party	Candidate	Votes	%	±%
Conservative	Thomas Meyrick	1,419	57.5	+26.2
Liberal	Hugh Owen Owen	1,049	42.5	−26.2
Majority		370	15.0	N/A
Turnout		2,468	81.5	+13.7
Registered electors		3,028		
Conservative gain from Liberal		Swing	+26.2	

=== Elections in the 1870s ===
General election 1874: Pembroke
Party	Candidate	Votes	%	±%
Liberal	Edward Reed	1,339	50.5	+8.0
Conservative	Thomas Meyrick	1,310	49.5	−8.0
Majority		29	1.0	N/A
Turnout		2,649	84.2	+2.7
Registered electors		3,146		
Liberal gain from Conservative		Swing	+8.0	

=== Elections in the 1880s ===
General election 1880: Pembroke
Party	Candidate	Votes	%	±%
Liberal	Henry George Allen	1,462	50.6	+0.1
Conservative	Thomas Meyrick	1,429	49.4	−0.1
Majority		33	1.2	+0.2
Turnout		2,891	86.6	+2.4
Registered electors		3,338		
Liberal hold		Swing	+0.1	

== Sources ==
- British Parliamentary Election Results 1832–1885, compiled and edited by F.W.S. Craig (The Macmillan Press 1977)
- The House of Commons 1690–1715, by Eveline Cruickshanks, Stuart Handley and D.W. Hayton (Cambridge University Press 2002)
- The Parliaments of England by Henry Stooks Smith (1st edition published in three volumes 1844–50), second edition edited (in one volume) by F.W.S. Craig (Political Reference Publications 1973)
- Leigh Rayment's Historical List of MPs – Constituencies beginning with "P" (part 1)
