= Lewis Watkins =

Lewis Watkins may refer to:

- Lewis G. Watkins, U.S. Marine
- Lewis Watkins (MP)

== See also ==
- Louis Watkins (disambiguation)
