= Pembroke and Haverfordwest =

UK Parliament constituency (1885–1918)

- Former borough constituency for the House of Commons

1885–1918
- Seats: one
- Created from: Haverfordwest and Pembroke
- Replaced by: Pembrokeshire

Pembroke and Haverfordwest was a parliamentary constituency centred on the towns of Pembroke and Haverfordwest in West Wales. It returned one Member of Parliament (MP) to the House of Commons of the Parliament of the United Kingdom, elected by the first past the post system.

== History ==
The constituency was created by the Redistribution of Seats Act 1885 for the 1885 general election, replacing the former Pembroke constituency. It was abolished for the 1918 general election.

The first member was H.G. Allen, Liberal member for Pembroke Boroughs since 1880. In 1886, Allen was among the Liberal members who broke with Gladstone over Irish Home Rule but, despite suggestions that the Conservatives would stand aside in his favour, Allen chose not to defend the seat as a Liberal Unionist. The seat was captured by the Conservatives at the subsequent election and remained a marginal constituency thereafter, changing hands on several occasions.

== Boundaries ==
Comprising the boroughs of Pembroke, Tenby, Wiston, Milford, Haverfordwest, Fishguard, and Narberth and part of the parish of Llanstadwell.

== Members of Parliament ==
Election	Member	Party
1885	Henry Allen	Liberal
1886	Richard Mayne	Conservative
1892	Charles Allen	Liberal
1895	John Laurie	Conservative
1906	Owen Philipps	Liberal
Jan 1910	Owen Philipps	Liberal
Dec 1910	Henry Guest	Liberal
1918	constituency abolished	

== Elections ==
=== Elections in the 1880s ===
General election 1885: Pembroke and Haverfordwest
Party	Candidate	Votes	%	±%
Liberal	Henry Allen	2,418	52.9	
Conservative	Richard Mayne	2,150	47.1	
Majority		268	5.8	
Turnout		4,568	83.4	
Registered electors		5,474		
Liberal win (new seat)				

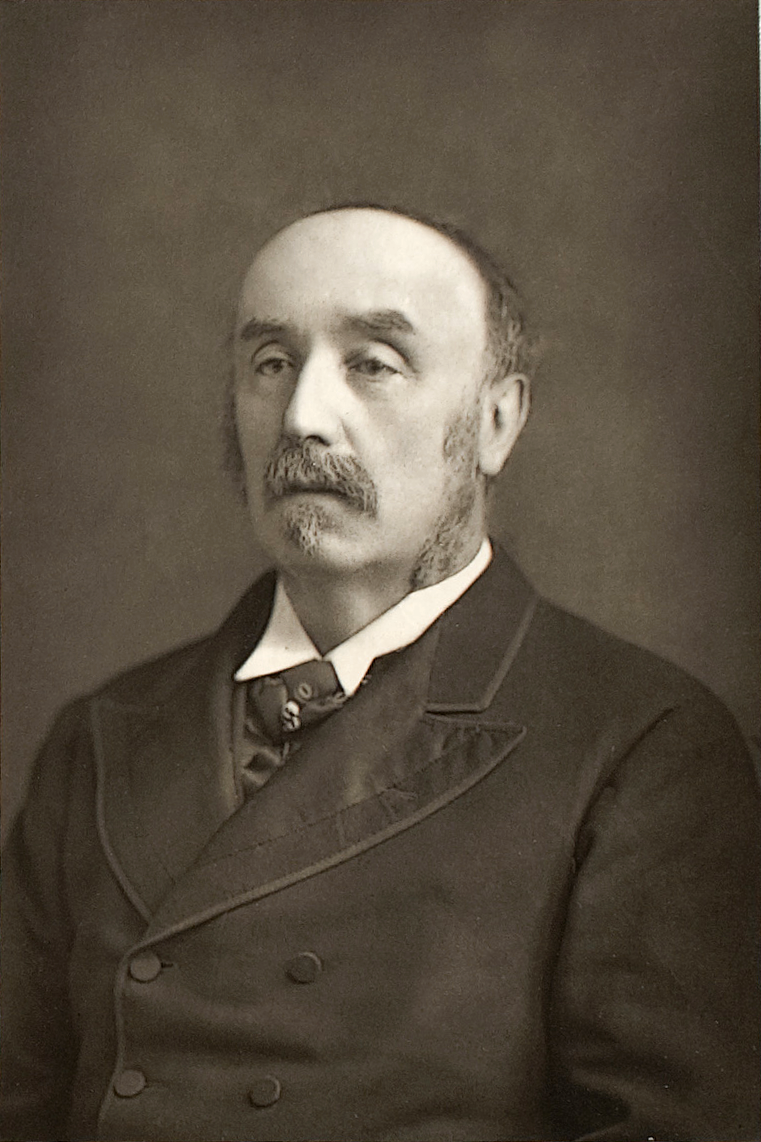
Lewis Morris

General election 1886: Pembroke and Haverfordwest
Party	Candidate	Votes	%	±%
Conservative	Richard Mayne	2,305	53.1	+6.0
Liberal	Lewis Morris	2,033	46.9	−6.0
Majority		272	6.2	N/A
Turnout		4,338	79.2	−4.2
Registered electors		5,474		
Conservative gain from Liberal		Swing	+6.0	

=== Elections in the 1890s ===
General election 1892: Pembroke and Haverfordwest
Party	Candidate	Votes	%	±%
Liberal	Charles Allen	2,580	52.0	+5.1
Conservative	John Laurie	2,385	48.0	−5.1
Majority		195	4.0	N/A
Turnout		4,965	83.0	+3.8
Registered electors		5,980		
Liberal gain from Conservative		Swing	+5.1	

General election 1895: Pembroke and Haverfordwest
Party	Candidate	Votes	%	±%
Conservative	John Laurie	2,719	51.6	+3.6
Liberal	Charles Allen	2,550	48.4	−3.6
Majority		169	3.2	N/A
Turnout		5,269	83.6	+0.6
Registered electors		6,299		
Conservative gain from Liberal		Swing	+3.6	

=== Elections in the 1900s ===
General election 1900: Pembroke and Haverfordwest
Party	Candidate	Votes	%	±%
Conservative	John Laurie	2,679	50.1	−1.5
Liberal	Thomas Terrell	2,664	49.9	+1.5
Majority		15	0.2	−3.0
Turnout		5,343	81.0	−2.6
Registered electors		6,598		
Conservative hold		Swing	-1.5	

- The count following the election initially recorded a Conservative victory by 2,679 to 2,667, a majority of 12. After a partial recount the margin had increased to 17 (2,679 to 2,662) with five reserved ballot papers. The Liberal campaign lodged a petition. Judges reviewed the reserved ballots and took the view that the result should be 2,679 to 2,664. The Liberal campaign accepted that review and withdrew their petition.

Owen Philipps

General election 1906: Pembroke and Haverfordwest
Party	Candidate	Votes	%	±%
Liberal	Owen Philipps	3,576	58.6	+8.7
Conservative	Reginald Pole-Carew	2,527	41.4	−8.7
Majority		1,049	17.2	N/A
Turnout		6,103	85.4	+4.4
Registered electors		7,150		
Liberal gain from Conservative		Swing	+8.7	

=== Elections in the 1910s ===
General election January 1910: Pembroke and Haverfordwest
Party	Candidate	Votes	%	±%
Liberal	Owen Philipps	3,582	55.5	−3.1
Conservative	Sir George Elliot Armstrong, 2nd Baronet	2,877	44.5	+3.1
Majority		705	11.0	−6.2
Turnout		6,459	88.0	+2.6
Liberal hold		Swing	-3.1	

Henry Guest

General election December 1910: Pembroke and Haverfordwest
Party	Candidate	Votes	%	±%
Liberal	Henry Guest	3,357	54.6	−0.9
Conservative	John Frederick Lort Phillips	2,792	45.4	+0.9
Majority		565	9.2	−1.8
Turnout		6,149	83.8	−4.2
Liberal hold		Swing	-0.9	

General Election 1914–15:

Another General Election was required to take place before the end of 1915. The political parties had been making preparations for an election to take place and by July 1914, the following candidates had been selected;

- Liberal: Henry Guest
- Unionist: David Hughes-Morgan
