= Roger Hale Sheaffe =

British Army officer and colonial administrator

General Sir Roger Hale Sheaffe Baronet
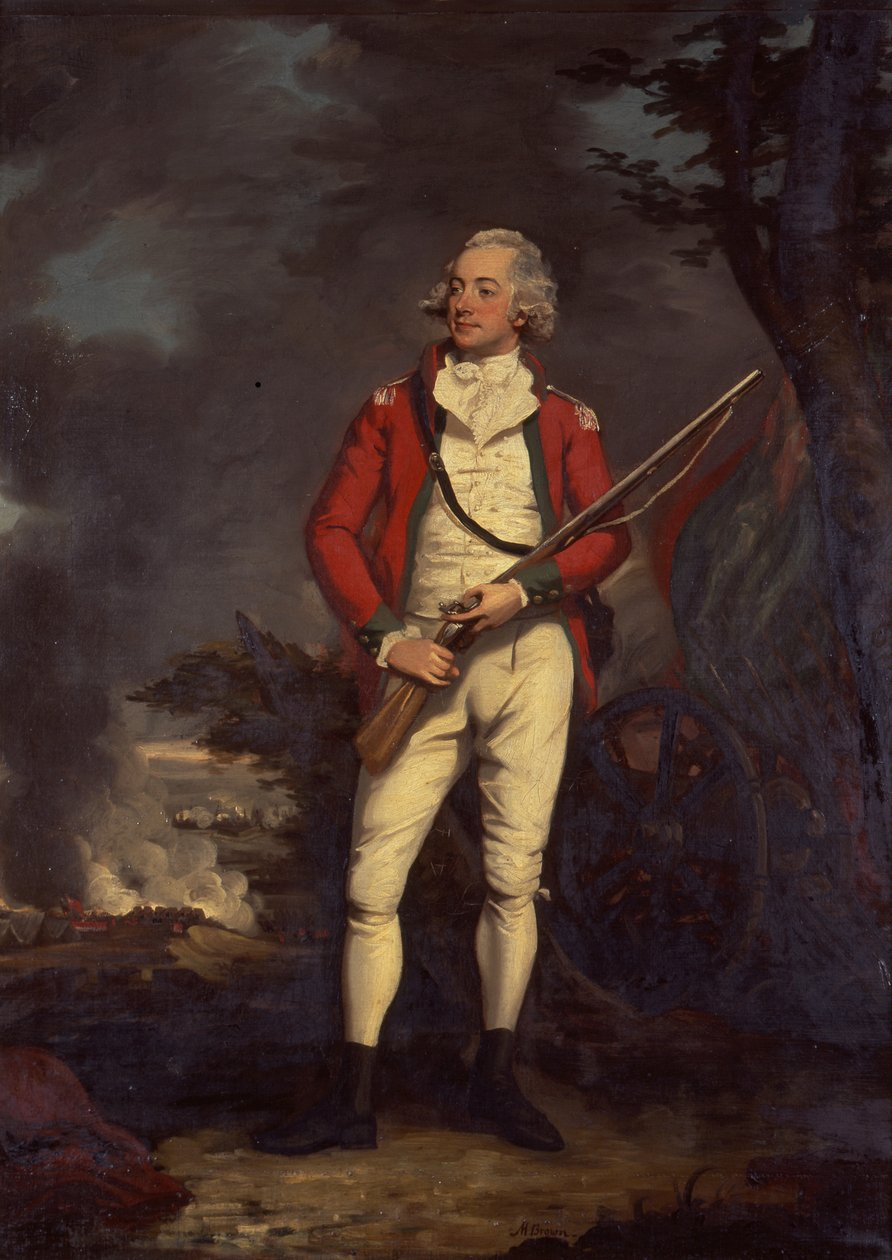
- Portrait by Mather Brown, c. 1790

Lieutenant Governor of Upper Canada
- In office 1812–1813
- Monarch: George III
- Preceded by: Isaac Brock
- Succeeded by: Francis de Rottenburg

Personal details
- Born: 15 July 1763 Boston, Massachusetts
- Died: 17 July 1851 (aged 88) Edinburgh, Scotland

Military service
- Allegiance: Great Britain; United Kingdom
- Branch/service: British Army
- Years of service: 1778–1835
- Rank: General
- Commands: Upper Canada (1812-1813); Montreal (1813)
- Battles/wars: War of the Second Coalition; War of 1812

General Sir Roger Hale Sheaffe, 1st Baronet (15 July 1763 – 17 July 1851) was a British Army officer and colonial administrator who served during the War of the Second Coalition and the War of 1812. After the death of Major General Isaac Brock at the Battle of Queenston Heights, Sheaffe became the military commander and acting Lieutenant Governor of Upper Canada. He was created a baronet in January 1813 in recognition of his leadership during the battle. In June 1813, Sheaffe was relieved of his civil and military responsibilities due to his decision to retreat at the Battle of York. He was recalled to England later that year. Sheaffe continued serving in the British Army and received a promotion to lieutenant general in 1821 and to full general in 1835.

== Early life ==
Roger Hale Sheaffe was born in Boston, Massachusetts, the third son and eighth child of Susannah Child (1730–1811) and William Sheaffe (1705–1771). His father was a graduate of Harvard University who became Deputy Collector of Customs at Boston.

After Sheaffe's father died in 1771, his mother took in boarders to support her children. One of the boarders was Hugh Percy, later the 2nd Duke of Northumberland, who commanded the 5th Regiment of Foot. Percy was struck by Sheaffe's leadership potential and sponsored his attendance at a military academy in London. Percy continued to be a benefactor, purchasing Sheaffe's first commission as an ensign in the 5th Foot in 1778 and a lieutenancy two years later.

== Military career ==
Sheaffe served with the 5th Regiment in Ireland from 1781 until 1787, when it was sent to the Province of Quebec, then part of British North America. Over the next ten years, Sheaffe's postings included Quebec, Montreal, Detroit, and Fort Niagara. In 1791, Sheaffe was at Fort Niagara when the Province of Quebec was split into Upper Canada and Lower Canada. In August 1794, the Lieutenant Governor of Upper Canada, John Graves Simcoe, sent Sheaffe and an escort to Sodus Point on the south shore of Lake Ontario to deliver an official protest regarding the establishment of an American settlement on Indigenous territory. Simcoe described Sheaffe as a “gentleman of great discretion, incapable of any intemperate or uncivil conduct.” In May 1795, Sheaffe purchased a captaincy in the 5th Foot, again paid for by Percy. The following year, Sheaffe was tasked with the evacuation of British personnel from Fort Niagara prior to the British turning the fort over to the Americans as stipulated in the Jay Treaty.

Sheaffe returned to Great Britain in September 1797, and three months later purchased a majority in the 84th Regiment of Foot. He subsequently transferred to the 49th Regiment of Foot as a lieutenant colonel. His immediate superior in the 49th Foot was Lieutenant Colonel Isaac Brock, who had recently assumed command of the regiment.

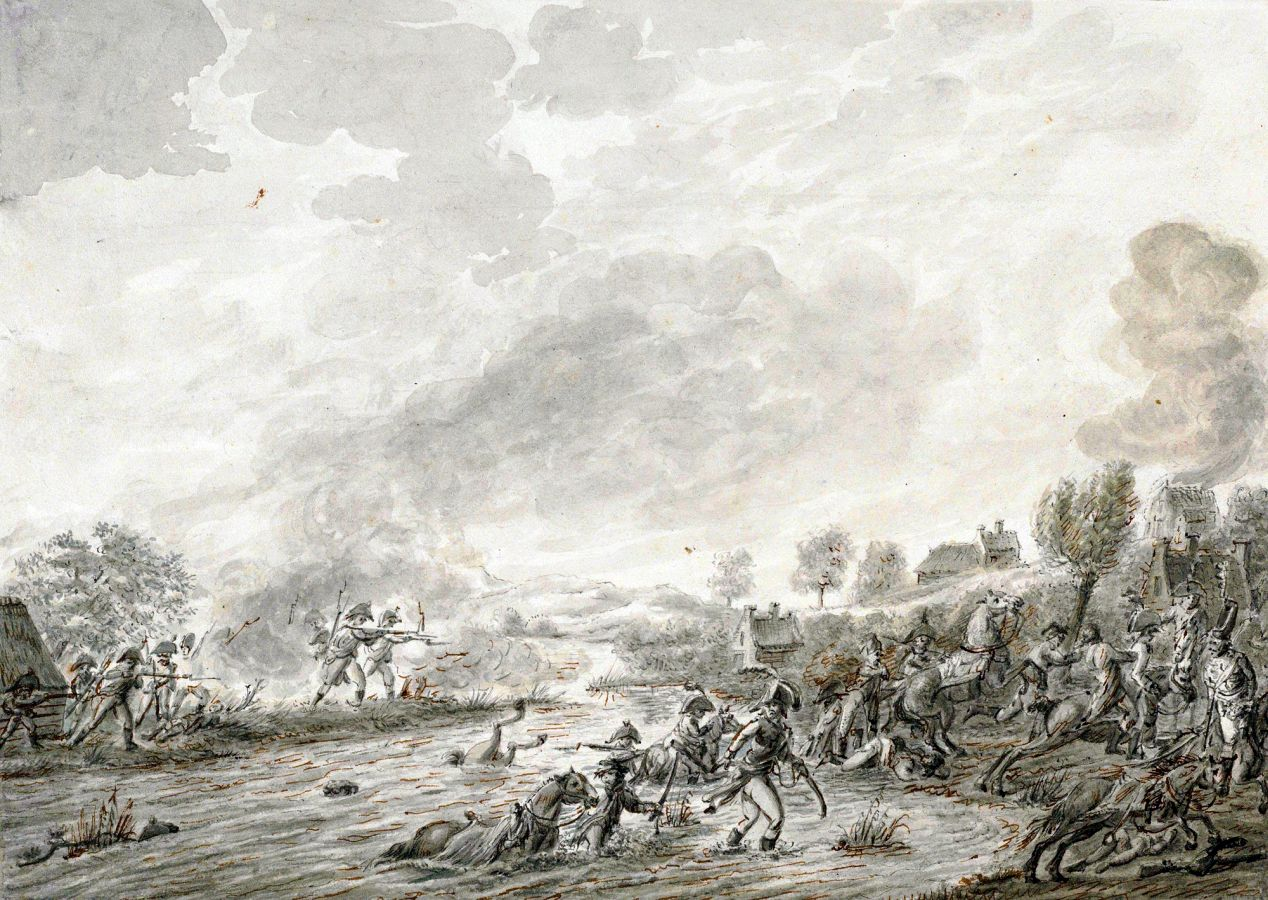
The Battle of Alkmaar, in which Sheaffe saw heavy action

In 1799, during the War of the Second Coalition, the 49th Foot was assigned to the Anglo-Russian invasion of Holland. The expedition faced minimal opposition when they landed at Callantsoog, south of Den Helder, on 27 August. Sheaffe first saw combat when the 49th Foot helped fend off a French attack on 10 September. On 2 October, the 49th Foot was actively involved in heavy combat at the Battle of Alkmaar. During the engagement, the regiment was in the vanguard of a column that steadily proceeded south along the beach from Petten towards Egmond aan Zee. As it advanced, the column was increasingly harassed by French sharpshooters hiding in patches of thick scrub. Eventually, the French blocked the advance by taking up a strong position in the dunes overlooking the beach. The 49th Foot was ordered to dislodge the French from their position. Brock wrote that he "ordered a charge, which I assure you was executed with the greatest gallantry, though not in the greatest order, as the nature of the ground admitted of none." The engagement continued for several hours until the French finally gave way and the British were able to push forward.

The 49th Foot returned to Great Britain at the end of October and garrisoned Jersey for several months beginning in July 1800. Early in 1801, the regiment was chosen to act as marines for a naval expedition against Denmark. The 49th Foot was tasked with assaulting the forts at Copenhagen, however, the outcome of the naval battle made such action unnecessary.

The 49th Foot was posted to Upper Canada in 1802. Sheaffe, an "old-fashioned disciplinarian" who "knew much about soldiering but little about leadership," was given command of Fort George in what is now Niagara-on-the-Lake. In August 1803, Sheaffe was faced with an incipient mutiny. He sent an urgent message to Brock stating that some soldiers were planning to confine or murder their officers then escape to the United States. Brock quickly came to his subordinate's aid. The mutineers were disarmed, arrested and sent to Quebec for court-martial. At their trial, the mutineers complained of Sheaffe's "harsh and severe" treatment of them. Four of the mutineers were sentenced to death, while the rest were transported for life. Brock was subsequently ordered to move his regimental headquarters to Fort George while Sheaffe took command of the small garrison at York.

Sheaffe was censured by Brock for being “indiscreet and injudicious." He felt that Sheaffe was too strict in applying the rules, and criticized the harsh and contemptuous manner when he spoke to the men. Brock also faulted Sheaffe for reducing non-commissioned officers to the ranks for minor infractions. Sergeant Major James Fitzgibbon of the 49th Foot noted that Sheaffe "was the best teacher I ever knew, but he was also a martinet and a great scold."

Sheaffe became the commanding officer of the 49th Foot in November 1805 after Brock was promoted to full colonel. Sheaffe was brevetted colonel in 1808 and subsequently served at different posts in the Canadas until he was promoted to major general in June 1811. This last promotion may have hurt Sheaffe financially because as an unassigned general officer he only received a colonel's half-pay. He then took extended leave in England. Meanwhile, Brock, who had also been promoted to major general, was given command of all British forces in Upper Canada. In October 1811, he was appointed administrator of Upper Canada when Francis Gore, the Lieutenant Governor, departed for England on leave. Brock was now both the senior military officer in Upper Canada and the leader of its civil government.

== War of 1812 ==
Sheaffe returned to Quebec in July 1812 shortly after the United States had declared war on the United Kingdom. Sir George Prevost, the Governor General of Canada, appointed Sheaffe to take command of British troops on the Niagara frontier. Meanwhile, Prevost arranged a temporary armistice with Major General Henry Dearborn, who commanded American forces in the northeastern United States, aiming to foster potential peace negotiations. When Sheaffe arrived at Fort George in mid-August, he took things a step further by negotiating agreement with his American counterpart, Major General Stephen Van Rensselaer. The agreement prevented the forwarding of troops and supplies westward, but did little to prevent the buildup of American forces on the east side of the Niagara River. Prevost privately criticized Sheaffe for overstepping his authority but took no disciplinary action. Prevost's armistice was quickly repudiated by President James Madison and hostilities began anew.

=== Battle of Queenston Heights ===
Brock arrived at Fort George on August 22, a week after American Brigadier General William Hull's surrender following the siege of Detroit. Prevented by the armistice from taking further offensive action, Brock and Sheaffe spent the next few weeks working to strengthen British defences along the Niagara River.

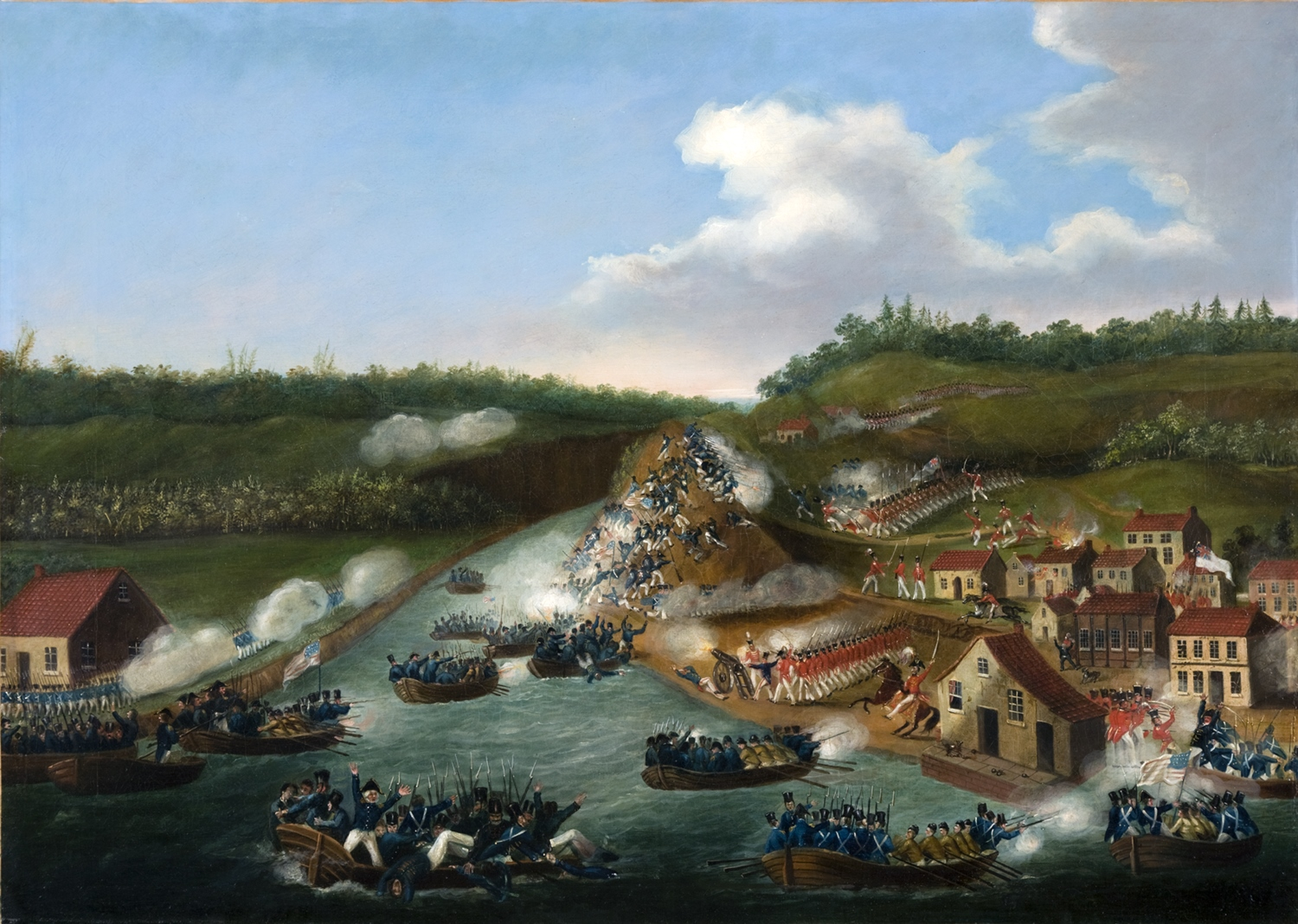
The Battle of Queenston Heights attributed to Captain James Dennis of the 49th Foot. The painting depicts the American landing on 13 October 1812. The village of Queenston is on the right with Queenston Heights behind.

Shortly before dawn on 13 October 1813, American regulars began crossing the Niagara River at Queenston, a village a few miles south of Fort George. Brock who had returned to Fort George following the successful Siege of Detroit, galloped to Queenston, arriving in time to witness the Americans capture the British artillery positioned on the heights overlooking the village. He sent orders to Sheaffe to bring up reinforcements, but before they could arrive Brock was shot and killed by an American sniper while leading a detachment of regulars and militia in an unsuccessful counterattack. The senior surviving British officer, Captain James Dennis, ordered his forces to abandon Queenston and pull back to Durham's Farm, a mile north of the village. Meanwhile, American regulars and militia, unimpeded by British artillery, crossed the river in large numbers and substantially reinforced the position on the heights.

Sheaffe arrived at Durham's Farm at mid-morning followed closely by the first of the British reinforcements from Fort George. Sheaffe had a Royal Artillery detachment advance on the village, supported by a company of the 41st Regiment of Foot under Captain William Derenzy. When the British artillery opened fire, it once again became hazardous for American boats to cross the river. Two boats were sunk, and the American six-pounders across the river were repeatedly silenced by shrapnel fire. Meanwhile, Derenzy slowly began pushing the Americans out of the village. At the same time, Mohawk warriors from the Grand River under John Norton climbed the escarpment west of the village and began harassing the Americans on the heights. Norton later wrote that they "discharged Leaden death among them" A significant number of American soldiers began to abandon their posts, unnerved by the sight of the dead and wounded, and the war cries of the Mohawk.

Sheaffe set out from Durham's Farm with roughly 650 men and marched across fields to ascend the escarpment, following the path that Norton had taken earlier. His forces then circled around to the south of the Americans. Sheaffe positioned the main body of his regulars facing the American line at a distance of about 400 yards (370 m). Two light companies of regulars, Runchey's Coloured Company, and Norton's Mohawks moved into position west of the Americans. When three companies of the 41st Foot from Chippewa arrived, Sheaffe ordered them into position on the eastern flank.

Sheaffe gave the order to advance. His regulars marched forward to within 100 yards (91 m) of the American line then volleyed en masse. The Americans fired a ragged volley in return then began to pull back. The British advanced by platoon, halting and firing as they did so, until they were exchanging point-blank fire with the retreating Americans. Meanwhile, the light companies, the Coloured Company and the Mohawks moved in from the west. While some of the Americans were able to make an orderly retreat towards the river, others panicked and threw down their weapons. When they reached the river they discovered that no boats were waiting to evacuate them. Some tried to swim to safety and were shot at. The American commander on the heights, Lieutenant Colonel Winfield Scott, claimed that it took three attempts with a flag of truce to surrender before the British finally ceased firing roughly an hour after the attack began.

After the battle, Sheaffe proposed a three-day truce and invited the Americans to send surgeons to assist in treating the wounded. Within days most of the American wounded as well as all of the militia prisoners were paroled and sent back across the river. The regulars, including Scott were escorted to Quebec, and but were repatriated in a prisoner exchange seven weeks later.

Sheaffe was criticized by Prevost for agreeing to an American proposal to extend the truce. He was also criticized for paroling the senior American militia officer, and for not immediately moving to take Fort Niagara. In recognition of the victory, however, the Prince Regent conferred upon Sheaffe the title of baronet on 16 January 1813.

=== Battle of York ===
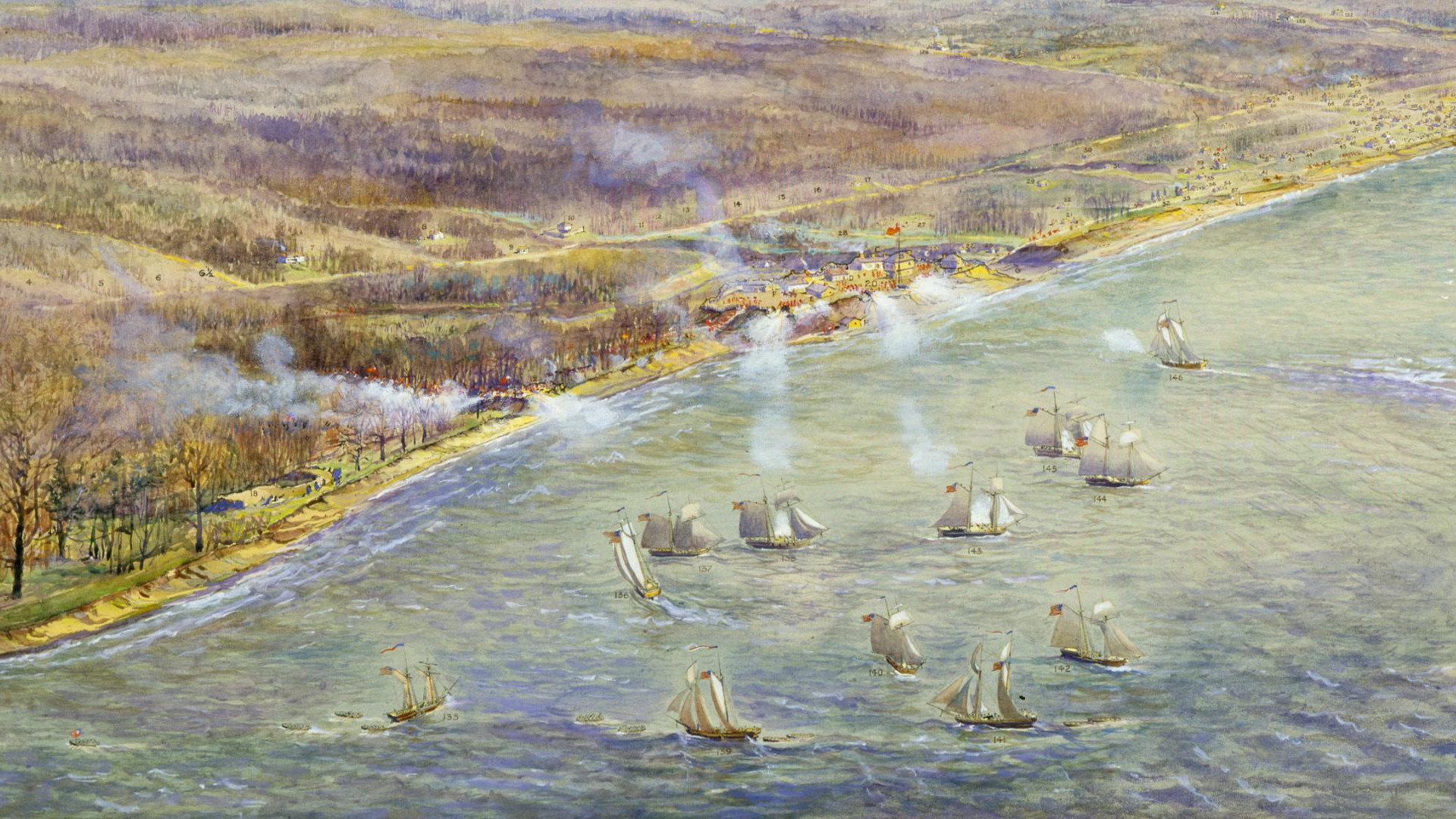
Detail from Arrival of American Fleet Prior to the Capture of York by Owen Staples. Source: Toronto Public Library

Sheaffe succeeded Brock as Upper Canada's military commander and acting Lieutenant Governor. He took the oath of office at York on 20 October 1812, but continued to spend much of his time at Fort George. That winter, he suffered from poor health and was preoccupied with military matters. In February, Sheaffe moved from Fort George to York. He opened the legislature of Upper Canada on 25 February 1813 and prorogued it two weeks later. Several bills were passed during the brief session, including legislation that authorized the creation of an incorporated militia battalion made up of volunteers who enlisted for the duration of the war. Another bill provided annuities for disabled militiamen and for the widows and children of those killed.

On 27 April 1813, a force of 1,700 American regulars led by Brigadier General Zebulon Pike landed a few miles west of York, supported by a fleet of 14 warships commanded by Commodore Isaac Chauncey. Defending York were two companies of the 8th Regiment of Foot, a company of the Royal Newfoundland Regiment of Fencible Infantry, a company of the Glengarry Light Infantry Fencibles, a detachment of the 49th Regiment of Foot, and a Royal Artillery detachment for a total of 413 regulars. Supporting the regulars were 477 militia, mostly from the 1st and 3rd York Regiments, and an estimated 50 Mississauga and Ojibwe warriors under the direction of Major James Givins. Most of the regulars were housed in a stockaded garrison located west of town on the east side of Garrison Creek. Sheaffe's headquarters were at Government House on the creek's west side. Further to the west was the stone-walled "grand magazine" that held about 300 barrels of gunpowder, 750 explosive shells and 40,000 musket rounds. Four artillery batteries protected the entrance to the harbour, including the Western Battery, 700 yards (640 m) west of Government House, which mounted two obsolete 18-pounder long guns. With 18 guns in total, the British batteries were outmatched by the 83 guns mounted on the ships of Chauncey's squadron.

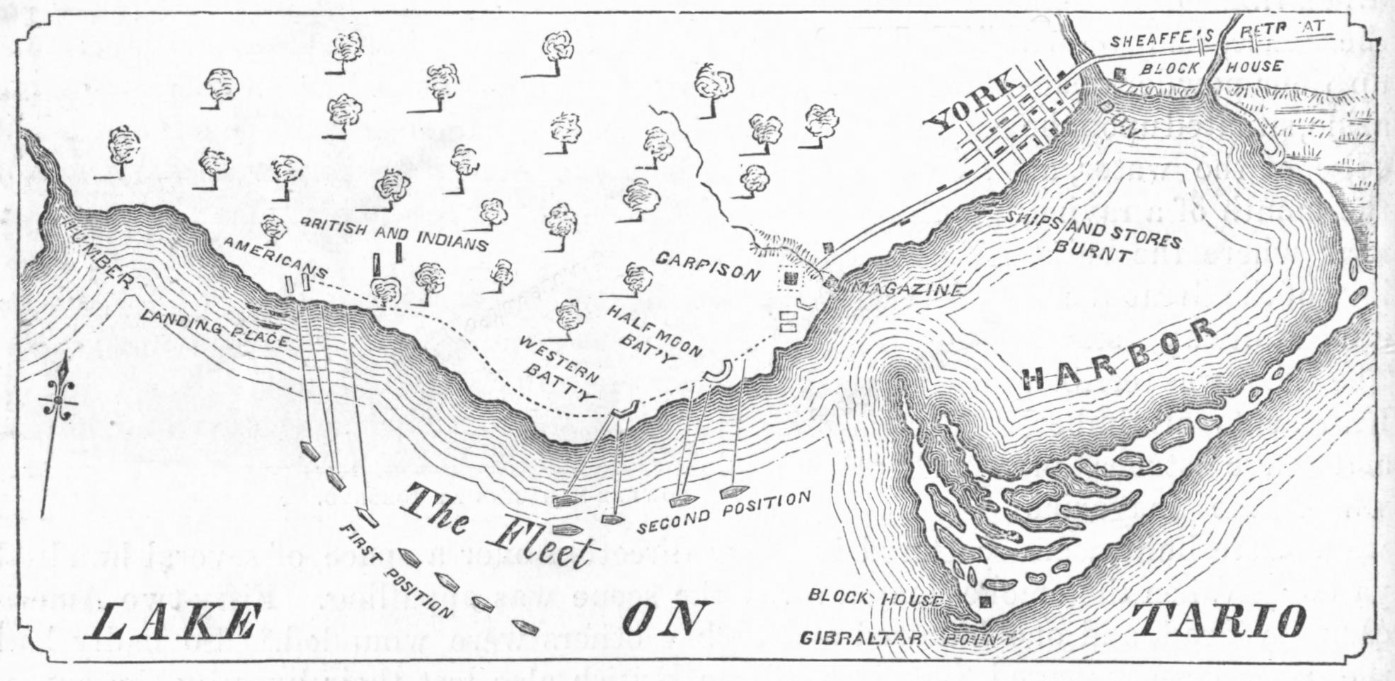
Battle of York from Benson John Lossing's Pictorial Field-book of the War of 1812. Lossing incorrectly placed the garrison on the west side of the Garrison Creek.

Sheaffe was at Government House when the Americans began landing. He quickly dispatched Givins with the Mississauga and Ojibwe to oppose the landing while the regulars and militia assembled. The Glengarries were ordered to support Givens but, for some inexplicable reason, they followed the militia, which had been sent north to block the road running west from York. The grenadier company of the 8th Foot was sent in their place but was forced back after suffering heavy casualties. Sheaffe then advanced in column with the Royal Newfoundland Fencibles and the second company of the 8th Foot. The British formed a line at a clearing 1,000 yards (910 m) west of Government House. Sheaffe ordered the Fencibles forward. The retreating grenadiers passed through the advancing line, pursued by the Americans who now engaged the Fencibles. The Fencibles fell back under heavy fire but were rallied by Sheaffe. The entire line advanced but was once again repulsed. Sheaffe then ordered a withdrawal back to the Western Battery.

The landing took place out of sight of the batteries, and Chauncey's fleet had remained out of range. After disembarking their passengers, however, several schooners moved inshore and opened fire on the batteries. The British returned fire, but a gunner at the Western Battery accidentally caused a box of cartridges to explode, killing ten and wounding many others. With casualties mounting, Sheaffe decided that the battle was lost. He withdrew his regulars into York and ordered the magazine destroyed.

Pike waited until the rest of his force had landed, then slowly proceeded forward. He had advanced to within 400 yards (370 m) of Government House and had sent an infantry detachment forward to conduct a reconnaissance when the magazine exploded. Debris flew in a 500-yard (460 m) radius, instantly killing 40 American soldiers. Over 200 were wounded, including Pike, who soon succumbed to his wounds. Despite this, the Americans continued their march towards York. Sheaffe ordered the destruction of the partially built sloop-of-war Sir Isaac Brock, then began a 160 mile (260 km) march east to Kingston. Lieutenant Colonel William Chewett and Major William Allan of the 3rd York Militia were left to negotiate the terms of surrender.

A total of 82 regulars, militia and Indigenous warriors were killed during the defence of York. An additional 111 were wounded, and seven were missing in action. 343 men were taken prisoner of whom 68 were wounded. Sheaffe regulars suffered the most casualties with 71 killed, seven missing, 31 wounded and 57 taken prisoner.

Sheaffe's decision to retreat was denounced by several of York's prominent citizens, spurred by the looting and destruction that took place during the six-day American occupation of York. In a letter to Prevost, written by Reverend John Strachan and signed by several of the town's residents, Sheaffe was accused of being indecisive during the battle, failing to give clear orders, and abandoning the town prematurely.

In June 1813, Prevost had Sheaffe replaced as military commander and acting lieutenant governor. In a letter to Henry Bathurst, the Secretary of State for War and the Colonies, Prevost wrote that Sheaffe had "lost the confidence of the province." Sheaffe was briefly placed in charge of troops in the Montreal District, but on Prevost's recommendation was recalled to Britain. Sheaffe departed Quebec for England in November 1813.

== Subsequent career ==
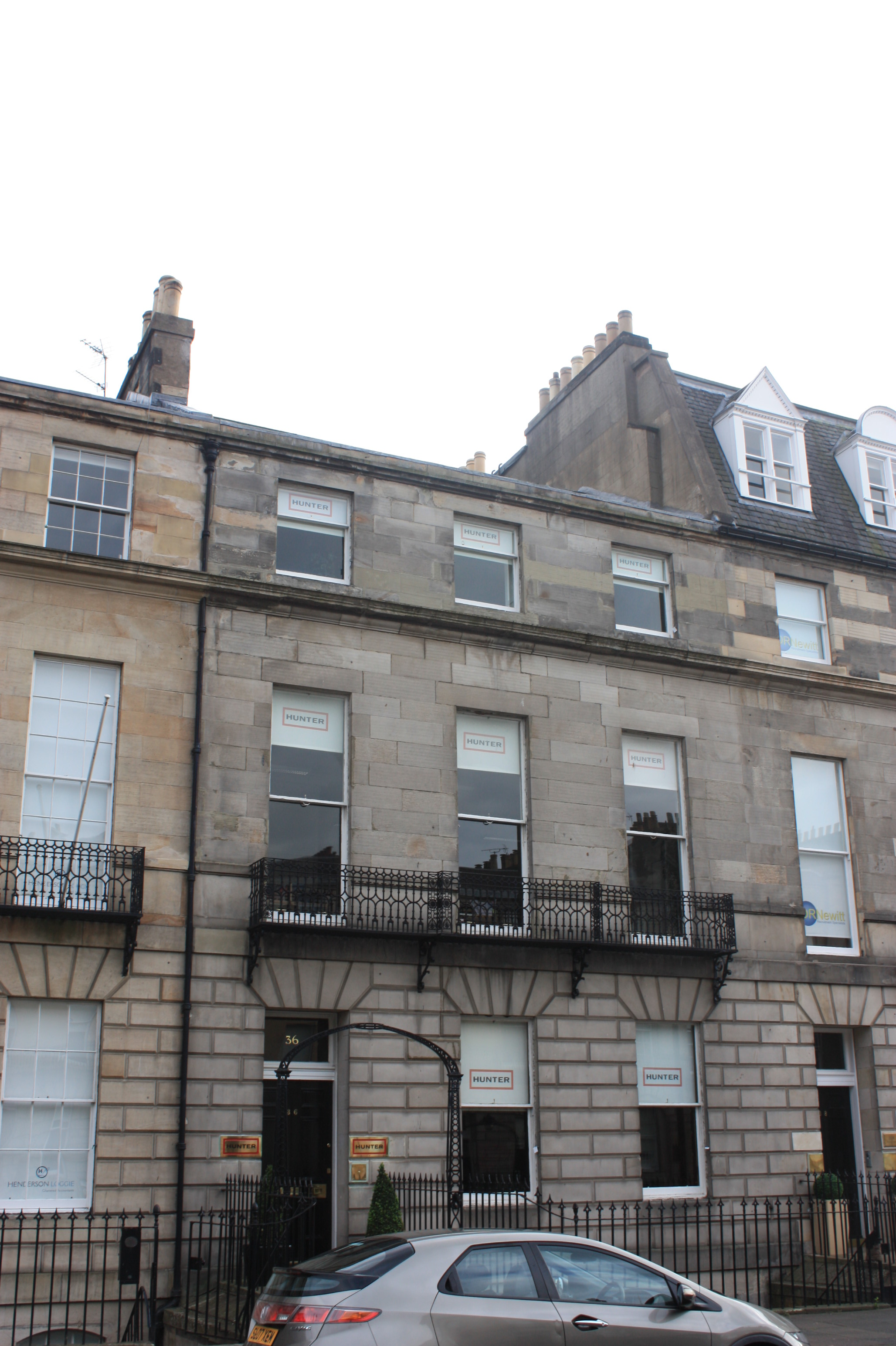
36 Melville Street, Edinburgh, Sheaffe's final home

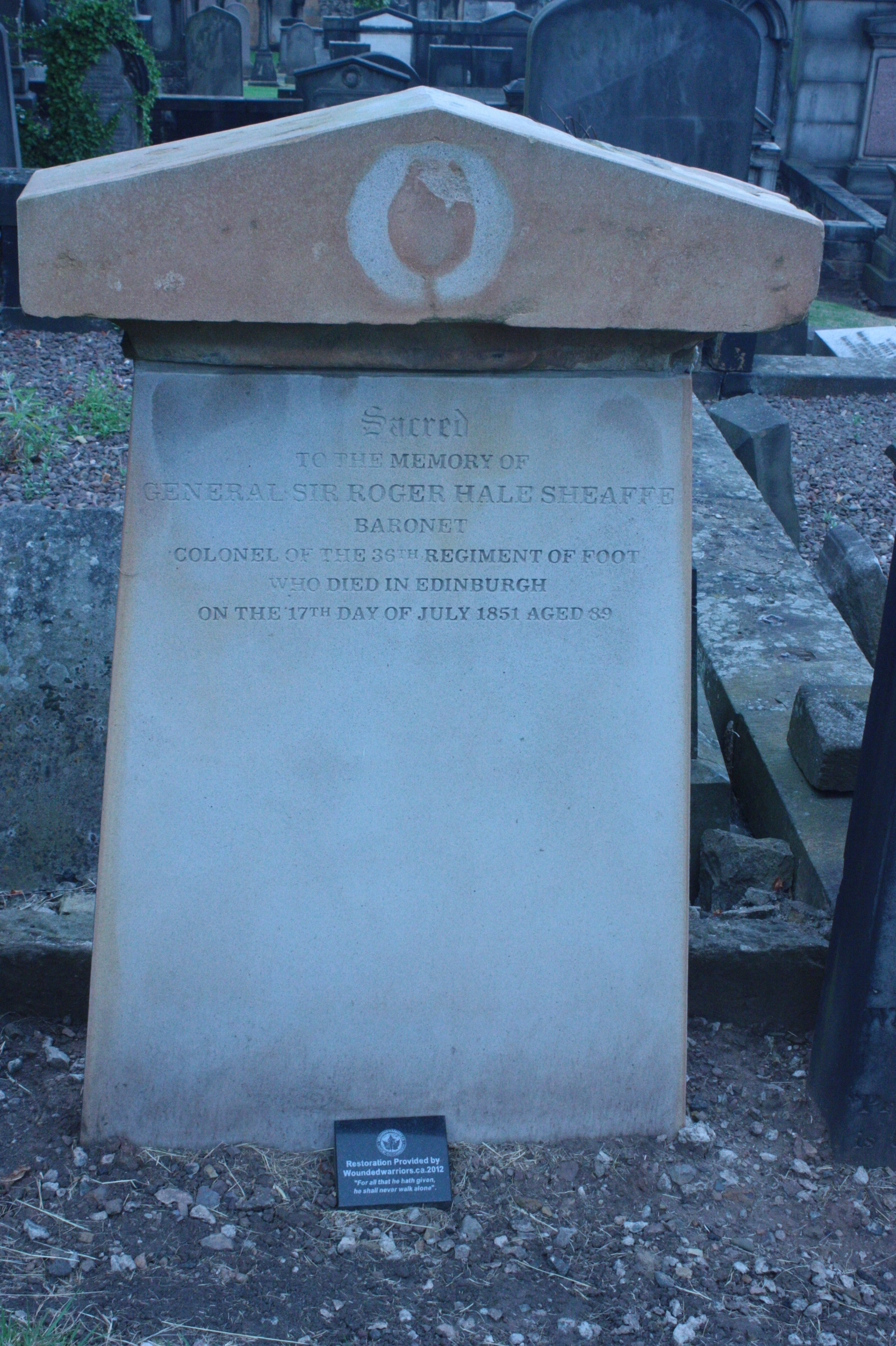
Grave of Roger Hale Sheaffe in New Calton Cemetery, Edinburgh

Sheaffe remained in the British Army and was promoted to Lieutenant General in 1821 and full General in 1835. In 1829, he was awarded a sinecure appointment as Colonel of the 36th (Herefordshire) Regiment of Foot. Sheaffe and his family lived in Penzance and Worcester, and moved to Edinburgh. In the 1830s he is listed as living at 12 Inverleith Row in North Edinburgh.

Sheaffe died at his home at 36 Melville Street on 17 July 1851, and is buried in New Calton Cemetery, beside his daughters Frances Julia and Agnes Emily. As none of his children survived him, his baronetcy died with him. His coat of arms, however, was bestowed on his deceased brother's children in perpetuity.

== Family ==
Sheaffe married Margaret Coffin, daughter of Isabella Child and John Coffin, at the Cathedral of the Holy Trinity in Quebec on 31 Jan 1810. Margaret was a relation of Sheaffe's mother from Boston. They had six children, all of whom predeceased their parents:

- Frances Julia Sheaffe, b. 1811 in Canada, d. 1834 in Edinburgh and buried next to her father.
- Agnes Isabella Sheaffe, b. 1814, d. 1814
- Percy Sheaffe, b. 1815, d. 1834 in England.
- Agnes Emily Sheaffe, b. 1817 in Worcester, d. 1832 in Edinburgh and buried next to her father.
- Unnamed daughter, b. 1817, Edinburgh, d. 1816 Edinburgh
- William Sheaffe, b. 1819 d. 14 Jan 1820 in England

Sheaffe's younger brother, William (1770–1812), and his wife Mary, died young leaving four children. Sheaffe adopted them as his own. Two of his nephews joined the British Army. One of his nephews, Lieutenant William Sheaffe, arrived in New South Wales Australia in 1824 with his wife, Rosalie, and a baby as passengers aboard a convict ship. Their two eldest children were left in the care of their great-uncle. All the Australian Sheaffes are descended from William and Rosalie.

== Dates of rank ==
- Ensign – 1 May 1778
- Lieutenant – 27 December 1780
- Captain – 6 May 1795
- Major – 13 December 1797
- Lieutenant Colonel – 22 March 1798
- Colonel – 25 April 1808
- Major General – 4 June 1811
- Lieutenant General – 19 July 1821
- General – 28 June 1838

Government offices
Preceded by Sir Isaac Brock	Lieutenant Governor of Upper Canada; 1812–1813	Succeeded by Francis de Rottenburg
Military offices
Preceded by Sir George Don	Colonel of the 36th (Herefordshire) Regiment of Foot; 1829–1851	Succeeded by Lord Frederick FitzClarence
Baronetage of the United Kingdom
New creation	Baronet (of Boston, Massachusetts); 1813–1851	Extinct
Preceded by Owen baronets	Sheaffe baronets of Boston; 16 January 1813	Succeeded by Galbraith baronets
