= HMS Nassau =

Six ships of the Royal Navy have borne the name HMS Nassau, after King William III who was of the House of Orange-Nassau, with the County of Nassau being a subsidiary holding of that family:

- HMS Nassau (1672) was a 4-gun fluyt captured from the Dutch in 1672 and given away later that year.
- HMS Nassau (1699) was an 80-gun third-rate ship of the line launched in 1699 and wrecked in 1706.
- HMS Nassau (1706) was a 70-gun third-rate ship of the line launched in 1706, rebuilt in 1740 and sold in 1770.
- HMS Nassau (1785) was a 64-gun third-rate ship of the line launched in 1785. She was converted into a 36-gun troopship in 1799 and was wrecked later that year.
- HMS Nassau was a 64-gun third rate originally named HMS Holstein, which the British captured at the Battle of Copenhagen in 1801. She was renamed HMS Nassau in 1805 and was sold in 1814.
- HMS Nassau (1866) was a wooden screw gunvessel launched in 1866, having been completed as a survey ship. She was broken up in 1880.
