= Nagle baronets =

Extinct baronetcy in the Baronetage of the United Kingdom

The Nagle Baronetcy, of Jamestown in the County of Westmeath, was a title in the Baronetage of the United Kingdom. It was created on 4 January 1813 for Richard Nagle. The second Baronet was member of parliament for County Westmeath. The title became extinct on his death in 1850.

== Nagle baronets, of Jamestown (1813) ==
Escutcheon of the Nagle baronets of Jamestown

- Sir Richard Nagle, 1st Baronet (died 1827)
- Sir Richard Nagle, 2nd Baronet (1800–1850)

Baronetage of the United Kingdom
Preceded by Home baronets	Nagle baronets of Jamestown; 2 January 1813	Succeeded by Owen baronets
