= Sir Hugh Owen Owen, 2nd Baronet =

Welsh baronet and politician

Hugh Owen Owen KBE

Member of Parliament for Pembroke
- In office 22 February 1861 – 18 November 1868
- Preceded by: John Owen
- Succeeded by: Thomas Meyrick
- In office 13 June 1826 – 20 February 1838
- Preceded by: John Hensleigh Allen
- Succeeded by: James Graham

Personal details
- Born: Henry Owen Lord; 25 December 1803
- Died: 5 September 1891 (aged 87)
- Party: Liberal
- Other political affiliations: Conservative/Tory
- Spouse(s): Henrietta Fraser Rodney (m. 1845) Angelina Maria Cecilia Morgan (m. 1825; died 1844)
- Children: 12, including Hugh Charles Owen
- Parent(s): John Owen; Charlotte Philipps
- Education: Christ Church, Oxford; Eton College

Sir Hugh Owen Owen, 2nd Baronet (25 December 1803 – 5 September 1891), known as Hugh Owen Lord until 1809, was a British Liberal Party, Conservative Party and Tory politician.

== Family and early life ==
Born in 1803 as Hugh Owen Lord, Owen was the son of Sir John Owen, 1st Baronet and his first wife Charlotte, daughter of John Lewes Philipps. He was a descendant of the nobleman Hwfa ap Cynddelw to the Owens of Orielton, Pembrokeshire, a family known for parliamentary and military service in Pembrokeshire. His surname was changed to Owen when his father inherited the estates of Hugh Owen's cousin Sir Hugh Owen, 6th Baronet, whom Owen was named after.

Educated at Eton College in 1817, and graduating from Christ Church, Oxford in 1822, he first married Angelina Maria Cecilia, daughter of Sir Charles Morgan, 2nd Baronet in 1825, and they had five sons and three daughters, including: Hugh Charles Owen (1826–1909); John Owen (1828–1890); Arthur Owen (1829–1876); and, William Owen (1832–1889).

After Angelina's death in 1844, he remarried in 1845 to Henrietta Fraser, daughter of Edward Rodney, and they had one son and three daughters, including Alice Henrietta Rodney Owen (died 1925); Ellen Rodney Owen; Edith Rodney Owen; and George Rodney Owen (1859–1886).

== Political career ==
Both Owen's father and cousin Hugh had been Tory MPs for Pembroke between 1809 and 1812, with the father also holding Pembrokeshire between 1812 and 1841. Owen also entered Parliament when he was first elected MP for Pembroke unopposed at the 1826 general election as a Tory, after which he admitted his youth and experience, and declared support for religious toleration but not Catholic relief.

Although he was re-elected numerous times, including as a Conservative in 1832, Owen was often criticised for an "inattention for his parliamentary duties". In Parliament, he voted against the abolition of the Welsh courts, arguing "our sessions should be held in future where they are at present held and, when the bill received Royal Assent, he signed a memorial expressing regret for it.

Owen was also against the parliamentary reform scheme put forward by Lord Blandford, divided against emancipation and the Galway franchise bill, and presented petitions for the abolition of slavery. In 1831, he divided against the Grey ministry's reform bill and for Isaac Gascoyne's wrecking amendment, and later divided against a reintroduced version of the former in 1831, and then again upon its second and third readings. He later resigned in 1838 when his father obliged him to vacate the seat for Sir James Graham, 2nd Baronet.

== 1861 Pembrokeshire by-election ==
After 23 years of absence from Parliament, in January 1861, he attempted to be elected as a Liberal for Pembrokeshire at a by-election resulting from the elevation of the sitting member, Lord Emlyn, to the peerage following the death of his father. Owen's candidacy was from the outset impacted upon by his financial difficulties, even though it was confidently asserted that his debts would be honoured.

Nominating him at Haverfordwest, Thomas Davies Lloyd of Bronwydd referred to the tradition of the house of Orielton and trusted that their fortunes would be revived. Owen was however, unsuccessful.

== Member for Pembroke Boroughs ==
Nevertheless, the next month, he was elected as a Liberal in his former constituency, Pembroke, succeeding his father who had recently died, at a by-election in 1861.

There was mounting opposition to Owen during the 1860s, and in 1864 there were suggestions that he be replaced by Richard Potter, chairman of the Great Western Railway. However, he held the seat until he was defeated in 1868.

== Baronetcy ==
Owen succeeded his father as Baronet of Orielton, Pembrokeshire on 6 February 1861 and, upon his own death in 1891, the title was passed to his son Hugh Owen.

== Other activities ==
On 16 September 1830, Owen was made Lieutenant-Colonel Commandant of his local militia unit, the Royal Pembroke Rifles, which became the Royal Pembroke Artillery in 1853. He held the command until 1875, and then became the unit's Honorary Colonel. From 1872 to his death, he was also aide-de-camp to Queen Victoria. He was also at some point Deputy Lieutenant of Pembrokeshire.

Owen died at Barnes in September 1891 aged 87. The passing years had erased some of the bitterness of political contests and the Pembrokeshire Herald, which was so hostile to him in the 1860s, described him as "accomplished, courteous and genial" and "in all respects a gentleman."

Parliament of the United Kingdom
Preceded by John Owen	Member of Parliament for Pembroke; 1861–1868	Succeeded by Thomas Meyrick
Preceded by John Hensleigh Allen	Member of Parliament for Pembroke; 1826–1838	Succeeded by James Graham
Baronetage of the United Kingdom
Preceded by John Owen	Baronet (of Orielton, Pembrokeshire); 1861–1891	Succeeded by Hugh Owen
