= John Lougher =

Welsh politician (died 1636)

John Lougher (died 8 January 1636) was a Welsh politician who sat in the House of Commons in 1601.

Lougher was the son of Robert Lougher of Tenby, Pembrokeshire and was educated at St Mary Hall, Oxford, where he graduated BA in 1594. He became a student of law at the Middle Temple in 1594.

In 1601, he was elected Member of Parliament for Pembroke and was appointed High Sheriff of Pembrokeshire for 1626–27.

He married twice: firstly Frances, the widow of Sir Thomas Smith and secondly Mary, the daughter of Sir Edward Fitton of Gawsworth, Cheshire, and the widow of William Polwhele, with whom he had a daughter.

Parliament of England
Preceded by Edward Burton	Member of Parliament for Pembroke; 1601	Succeeded by Richard Cuney
