= Henry George Allen =

British lawyer and politician

Henry George Allen MA JP QC (29 July 1815 – 20 November 1908) was a British lawyer and Liberal politician.

== Early life and career ==
Allen was the second son of John Hensleigh Allen of Cresselly, Pembrokeshire and his wife, Lady Gertrude Seymour, daughter of Lord Robert Seymour. His father had been MP for Pembroke and his maternal grandfather had been MP for Carmarthenshire.

Allen was educated at Rugby School and at Christ Church, Oxford and was called to the bar at Lincoln's Inn in May 1841. He was Recorder of Andover from 1859 to 1872. In 1880 he became Queen's Counsel and in 1881 a Bencher. He was JP and Chairman of the Quarter Sessions for Pembrokeshire.

== Parliamentary career ==
Allen was elected Member of Parliament for Pembroke in 1880, and he held the seat until it was reorganised under the Redistribution of Seats Act 1885. In the 1885 general election, he was elected MP for Pembroke and Haverfordwest, narrowly defeating Admiral Richard Mayne. He held the seat until he stood down at the 1886 general election.

=== Irish Home Rule and retirement from Parliament ===
During the 1885-86 Parliament it became clear that Allen's views ran contrary to those of the more radical wing of the Liberal Party. He voted against Lewis Dillwyn's bill proposing disestablishment of the Church of England in Wales, and was absent from the division on the land reform bill introduced by Jesse Collings. To compound matters, Allen voted against Gladstone's Irish Home Rule Bill and joined the ranks of the Liberal Unionists. He was also opposed to Welsh disestablishment.

Admiral Mayne had been re-adopted as Conservative candidate for Pembroke Boroughs following his narrow defeat the previous years and a suggestion was made that Allen contest the Pembrokeshire seat against William Davies with the support of the Conservatives. Meanwhile, the Conservatives of Milford Haven suggested that the party stand down in favour of Allen contesting the Boroughs as a Liberal Unionist. Allen does not appear to have seriously considered either option and it soon became known that he had decided to retire from the Commons.

Shortly after the election was announced, Mayne arrived in the constituency to launch his campaign. At a meeting in Pembroke's Masonic Hall, he emphasised that he had consulted with Allen before travelling to the constituency producing a letter in his possession from Allen confirming his decision to retire.

== Later life and death ==
He was elected unopposed as a member of Pembrokeshire County Council in 1889, representing the Carew ward. At the first meeting of the council, Allen gained the most votes in the election of aldermen. Soon after he became the first permanent chairman of the county council.

Allen died unmarried at the age of 93.

Parliament of the United Kingdom
Preceded by Edward Reed	Member of Parliament for Pembroke; 1880–1885	Constituency abolished (see Pembroke & Haverfordwest)
New constituency	Member of Parliament for Pembroke and Haverfordwest; 1885–1886	Succeeded by Richard Mayne
