= Hugh Barlow (1729–1809) =

British Member of Parliament (1729–1809)

Hugh Barlow (1729 – 23 January 1809) was a British politician who sat in the House of Commons for 24 years from 1774 to 1809.

Barlow was born Hugh Owen, the son of Wyrriott Owen of Great Nash and his wife Anne Barlow, daughter of John Barlow MP of Lawrenny, Pembrokeshire. He married firstly Emma Owen, daughter of Lt.-Gen. John Owen MP. He succeeded his father in 1755.

In the 1774 general election Owen was returned unopposed as Member of Parliament for Pembroke. He succeeded to Great Nash on the death of his nephew Wyrriot Owen in 1780. He was re-elected MP for Pembroke in the 1780 and 1784 general elections. When his cousin Sir Hugh Owen, 5th Baronet died in 1786 leaving an infant heir, Hugh Owen became acting head of the Orielton family interest. He was on poor terms with Sir Hugh's widow and his opposition politics were against the family's interest. Nevertheless, he carried on representing Pembroke Boroughs in that interest, unopposed. He succeeded to Lawrenny on the death of his Aunt Elizabeth Barlow, widow of Hugh Barlow in 1788 and assumed the name of Barlow in 1789.

He was a childless widower and his main object was to secure the Pembrokeshire seat for his infant ward, Hugh Owen in the future. He was returned for Pembroke in 1790 and continued to vote occasionally with the Whigs, although no speech by him is known. He married as his second wife Anne Crespigny, daughter of Philip Champion Crespigny of Burwood, Surrey on 24 August 1791. He was returned for Pembroke again in 1796, 1802, 1806 and 1807. He resided seven months a year in Pembrokeshire and promoted local bills on roads and fisheries which ensured his popularity there. One critic described him as “the merest whiffler in the world”.

When he died on 23 January 1809, Barlow had not been able to secure the Pembrokeshire seat for his ward Sir Hugh Owen but was briefly succeeded by him at the Pembroke constituency.

Parliament of Great Britain
Preceded by Sir William Owen, Bt	Member of Parliament for Pembroke; 1774–1809	Succeeded by Sir Hugh Owen, 6th Bt
