= HMS Nassau (1866) =

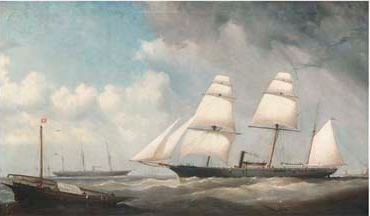
Captain Haughton Forrest, H.M.S. Nassau passing the P. & O. steamer Deccan, probably off Suez, 1870

HMS Nassau was a Cormorant-class wooden-hulled gun vessel of the Royal Navy. She was the sixth and to date last Royal Navy ship to bear that name.

Powered by screw propulsion with a displacement of 877 tons, she was launched at Pembroke Dockyard on 20 February 1866 and completed into a survey ship that July.

Her first commander was Captain Charles Richard Mayne and her first mission to re-survey the passage north into the Pacific and the Straits of Magellan in South America, as recorded in her log kept at The National Archives. Robert Oliver Cunningham was aboard as naturalist on that voyage and collected the holotype of Maynea on the voyage, naming it after Captain Mayne.

She then moved on to surveying on the China Station under Commander William Chimmo (1870–1873), mostly carrying out sub-surface temperature measurements and deep-sea soundings, though also sending men ashore in boats to destroy a pirate stronghold in the Sulu Archipelago in 1872. During that posting she also experienced a typhoon on 28 September 1870 whilst anchored at Hong Kong. Next she moved to the East Indies Station under Lieutenant Francis John Gray (1873–1875) surveying East Africa and joined with HMS London's boats and fellow gun vessel HMS Rifleman in 1875 to bombard Mombasa. Her final posting was a brief period back on the China Station before being broken up in 1880.
