= Sir John Stepney, 3rd Baronet =

Sir John Stepney, 3rd Baronet (1618 – c. 1676) was a Welsh politician who sat in the House of Commons from 1640 to 1643. He supported the Royalist side in the English Civil War.

Stepney was the son of Sir John Stepney, 1st Baronet, and his wife Jane Mansel, daughter of Sir Francis Mansel of Muddlescomb, Carmarthenshire. He succeeded to the baronetcy on the death of his brother Alban in 1628. In 1637 he was High Sheriff of Pembrokeshire.

In April 1640, Stepney was elected Member of Parliament for Pembroke in the Short Parliament. He was elected MP for Haverfordwest for the Long Parliament in November 1640 and held the seat until he was disabled from sitting in 1643. He remained loyal to the king and was governor of the town of Haverfordwest during the Civil War. He was captured by the Parliamentary forces at Hereford on 18 December 1645 and imprisoned. He compounded on 2 March 1646 and was fined £1230 on 23 December 1646. This was reduced to £550 on 1 Oct 1649 and he was discharged on 31 May 1650.

Stepney married Magdalen Jones, daughter of Sir Henry Jones of Abermarlais.

Parliament of England
Vacant Parliament suspended since 1629	Member of Parliament for Pembroke; 1640	Succeeded by Sir Hugh Owen, 1st Baronet
Preceded by Sir Hugh Owen, Bt	Member of Parliament for Haverfordwest; 1640–1643	Succeeded by Robert Needham
Baronetage of England
Preceded by Alban Stepney	Baronet (of Prendergast) ca. 1628 – ca. 1650	Succeeded by John Stepney
