= Lewis Powell (MP) =

Welsh politician

Lewis Powell (c. 1576–1636) was a Welsh politician who sat in the House of Commons between 1621 and 1625.

Powell was the son of Morgan Powell of Pembroke. He matriculated at Jesus College, Oxford on 23 October 1590 at the age of 14. He became a student of the Middle Temple in 1595. In 1621, he was elected Member of Parliament for Pembroke. He was unseated on petition on 18 May 1621, apparently owing to a double return. A new writ was ordered the same day and he was probably re-elected. In 1624 he was elected MP for Haverfordwest. He was elected MP for Pembroke again in 1625.

Parliament of England
Preceded by Sir Walter Devereux	Member of Parliament for Pembroke; 1621–1622	Succeeded by Sir Walter Devereux
Preceded by Sir James Perrot	Member of Parliament for Haverfordwest; 1624	Succeeded by Sir Thomas Canon
Preceded by Sir Walter Devereux	Member of Parliament for Pembroke; 1625	Succeeded by Hugh Owen
