= Edward Reed (naval architect) =

British politician

Sir Edward Reed KCB FRS
- 1895

Member of Parliament for Pembroke
- In office 1874–1880
- Preceded by: Thomas Meyrick
- Succeeded by: Henry George Allen

Member of Parliament for Cardiff
- In office 1880–1895
- Preceded by: James Crichton-Stuart
- Succeeded by: James Mackenzie Maclean

Member of Parliament for Cardiff
- In office 1900–1906
- Preceded by: James Mackenzie Maclean
- Succeeded by: Ivor Guest

Personal details
- Born: 20 September 1830 Sheerness, Kent, England
- Died: 30 November 1906 (aged 76) The Strand, London, England
- Cause of death: Heart failure
- Resting place: Putney Vale Cemetery
- Party: Liberal

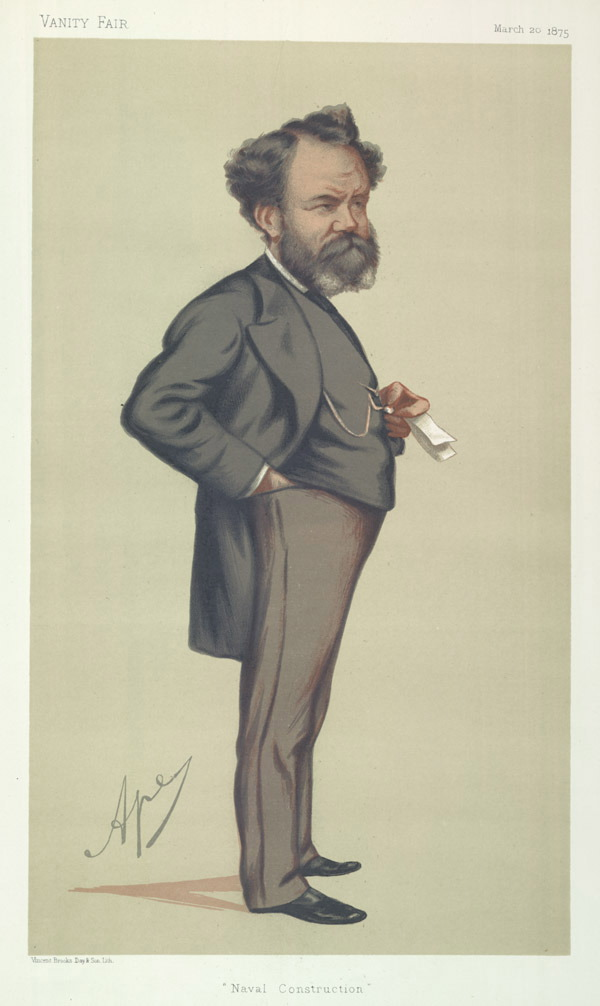
"Naval Construction". Caricature by Ape published in Vanity Fair in 1875

Sir Edward James Reed, KCB, FRS (20 September 1830 – 30 November 1906) was an English naval architect, author, politician, and railroad magnate. He was the Chief Constructor of the Royal Navy from 1863 until 1870. He was a Liberal politician who sat in the House of Commons from 1874 to 1906.

== Early life ==
Edward Reed was born in Sheerness, Kent and was the son of John and Elizabeth Reed. He was a naval apprentice at Sheerness and subsequently entered the School of Mathematics and Naval Construction at Portsmouth. In 1851 he married Rosetta, the sister of Nathaniel Barnaby. Barnaby was at that time a fellow student; he would subsequently succeed Reed as Chief Constructor. In 1852 he entered employment at Sheerness Dockyard, but resigned after a disagreement with the management. He then worked in journalism, including editing the Mechanics' Magazine. In 1860, Reed was appointed secretary of the newly formed Institute of Naval Architects.

== Naval architect ==
In 1863, at the early age of 33, succeeded Isaac Watts as Chief Constructor. His term of office saw the final transition from wooden to ironclad warships. Notable warships constructed under his direction included:

- HMS Bellerophon using an innovative "bracket frame" system of construction in 1865.
- The ocean-going turret-ship HMS Monarch in 1868.
- The mastless turret ship HMS Devastation in 1871.

His tenure was marred by intense controversy with the naval officer, MP and inventor Captain Cowper Phipps Coles. This culminated in the funding by Parliament of a new battleship, HMS Captain, to be built to Coles' requirement without reference to Reed's department and contrary to his advice. Embittered, Reed resigned in July 1870. "His departure was described as a national disaster by the Controller, Vice-Admiral Robert Spencer Robinson." The following September, the Captain foundered in a gale with the loss of nearly 500 lives, including Captain Coles.

He was a trenchant, though ultimately reactionary, critic of the policy of his successors as Chief Constructor. After leaving the Admiralty, he continued to design warships for the navies of other nations. These included Brazil, Germany, Chile and Japan. A number of these vessels were subsequently purchased by the Royal Navy.

Reed was appointed Companion of the Bath (CB) in 1868, during his term as Chief Constructor, and subsequently Knight Commander of the Bath (KCB) in 1880. He was elected Fellow of the Royal Society (FRS) in 1876. He was also a Knight Commander of the Imperial Russian Order of St Stanislus, a Knight of the Austrian Order of Franz Joseph, and of the Turkish Order of the Medjidie. Reed was an elected honorary member of the American Society of Mechanical Engineers in 1882.

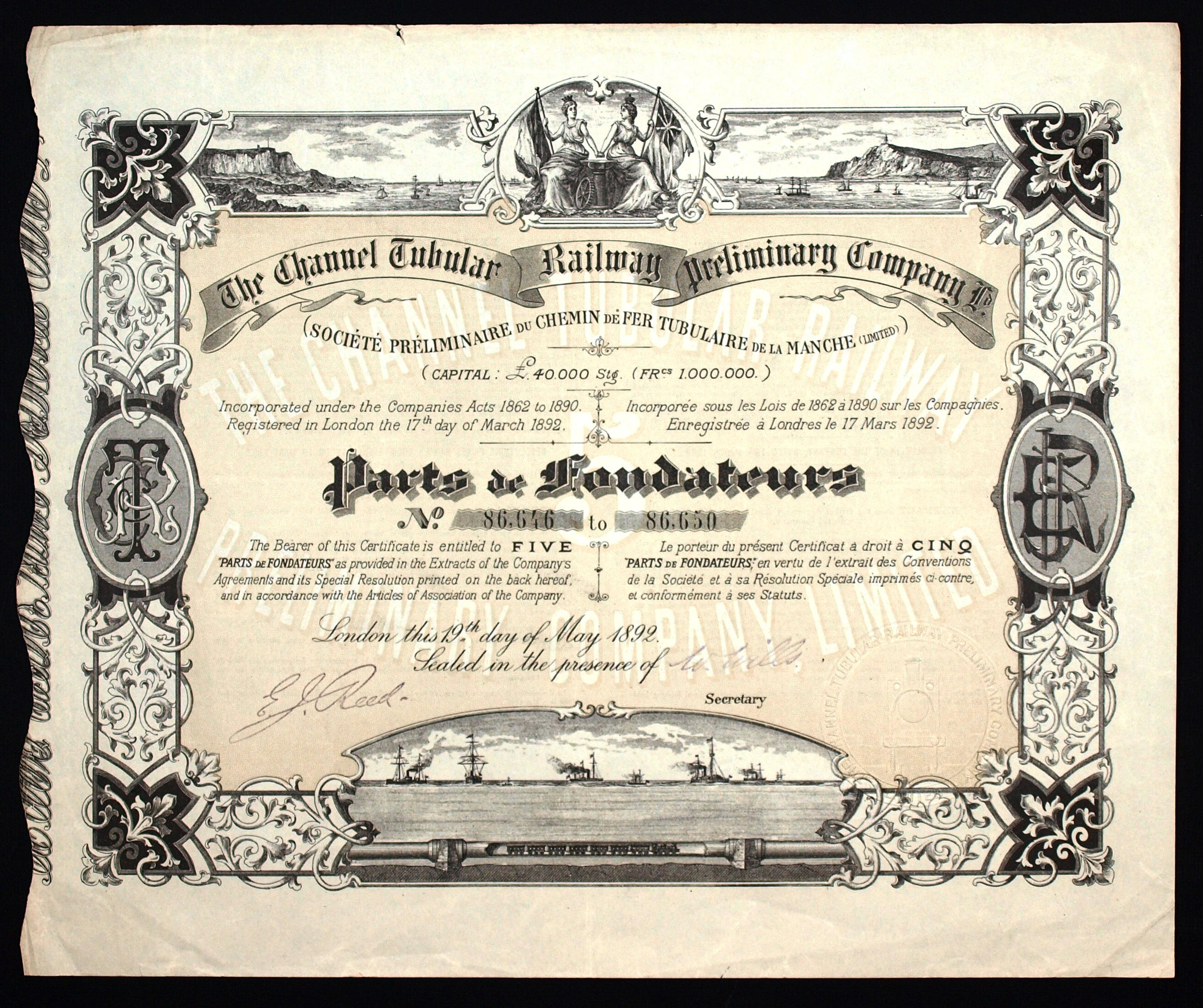
Founder's share of the Channel Tubular Railway Preliminary Company, issued 19. May 1892, signed by Edward James Reed

At Reed's suggestion, the Channel Tubular Railway Preliminary Company was founded in London in 1892, a company with a capital of £40,000, whose capital was to be raised through the issue of 250,000 Parts de Fondateurs. The company, led by Reed, planned the construction of a railway tunnel through the English Channel, which would allow travelers to reach their destination faster than would be possible with a boat crossing. The project failed due to political considerations.

== Parliamentary career ==
At the 1874 general election Reed was elected as Liberal member of parliament for Pembroke.

Reed visited Japan in 1879 at the invitation of the Imperial Government. Ostensibly Reed was there to oversee the delivery of three new British built iron-clad warships, Fusō, Kongō, and Hiei for the Imperial Japanese Navy. Given the ostentatious entertainment provided by his Japanese hosts over a period of three months, there were also inevitable political considerations; Japan was actively seeking revision of unequal trade agreements and was eager to develop influence with prominent Liberal members of the House of Commons. On his return to London, Reed wrote a sympathetic history of the country published to some success the following year.

At the next General Election in 1880 he was elected as member for Cardiff. In 1886, he was appointed Lord of the Treasury in Gladstone's third ministry.

Reed lost his parliamentary seat in 1895, but regained it in 1900. In 1905 he indicated that he would retire from parliament at the next election that occurred in 1906.

== Florida railroad magnate ==
In 1881, Reed and several English and Dutch investors purchased the Atlantic, Gulf, and West India Transit Company, the 1872 reorganization of the Florida Railroad, which ran cross-state in Florida from Fernandina southwest to Cedar Key, and which operated two subsidiaries: the Peninsular Railroad, running to Ocala and Silver Springs from a junction with the Florida Railroad at Waldo; and the Tropical Florida Railroad, which ran from Ocala to Wildwood. Reed reorganized the three railroads as the Florida Transit Company, which he reorganized again as the Florida Transit and Peninsular Railroad in 1883.

In 1882, Reed acquired the Jacksonville, Pensacola and Mobile Railroad (JP&M), which ran from Quincy east through Tallahassee to Lake City, and its subsidiary, the Florida Central Railroad, which ran east from Lake City to Jacksonville. Reed reorganized both the JP&M and the Florida Central as the Florida Central and Western Railroad.

In 1884, Reed merged the Florida Central and Western with the Florida Transit and Peninsular and, in 1885, after signing lease agreements with two smaller Florida lines, brought all of these entities under the umbrella of one large firm, the Florida Railway and Navigation Company. Reed subsequently withdrew from active control and, in 1886, after a brief receivership, the corporation was reorganized as the Florida Central and Peninsular Railroad (FC&P). In 1900, a year after purchasing the majority of FC&P stock, the newly organized Seaboard Air Line Railway (now CSX Transportation) leased the FC&P and, in 1903, acquired it outright.

== Death ==
Reed died from heart failure at his home in The Strand, London in November 1906. He was buried in Putney Vale Cemetery on 4 December. His son Edward Tennyson Reed became the political caricaturist of Punch magazine.

== Works ==
Notable works include

- Shipbuilding in Iron and Steel (1868)
- Our Ironclad Ships, their Qualities, Performance and Cost (1869)
- Japan: its History, Traditions, and Religions, with the Narrative of a Visit in 1879 Two volumes. London, J. Murray (1880)
- Treatise on the stability of ships (1884)
- Modern ships of war (1888) at Project Gutenberg

Parliament of the United Kingdom
Preceded by Thomas Meyrick	Member of Parliament for Pembroke; 1874–1880	Succeeded by Henry George Allen
Preceded by James Crichton-Stuart	Member of Parliament for Cardiff; 1880–1895	Succeeded by James Mackenzie Maclean
Preceded by James Mackenzie Maclean	Member of Parliament for Cardiff; 1900–1906	Succeeded by Ivor Guest
