= William Watkin (MP for Pembroke) =

16th-century English politician

William Watkin (fl. 1558) was an English politician.

== Family ==
Watkin's identity is not known. He may have been the son of Lewis Watkins, MP for Pembroke in 1545, although Bindoff considers this unlikely.

== Career ==
Watkin was a member (MP) of the parliament of England for Pembroke Boroughs in 1558.

Parliament of England
Preceded by Richard Philipps	Member of Parliament for Pembroke Boroughs; 1558	Succeeded by Henry Dodds
