= Wirriot Owen =

Welsh politician (died 1713)

Wirriot Owen (c. 1681 – 1713) was a Welsh Whig politician who sat as MP for Pembrokeshire from 1705 to 1710.

== Family and education ==
He was the seventh but second surviving son of Sir Hugh Owen, 2nd Baronet and his first wife. He was educated at Gray's Inn and matriculated in 1697. He married a widow called Dorothy Cosens (died 1703) and they had one daughter.

== Death ==
He died in 1713 and was buried at Monkton, Pembroke.
