= John Meyrick (politician) =

Welsh politician and judge

John Meyrick (1674 – c. 1735) was a Welsh politician and judge.

A member of an established Pembrokeshire family, he represented the parliamentary constituencies of Pembroke between 1702 and 1708, and Cardigan between 1710 and 1712. He was later puisne judge of the Anglesey circuit (1712–1714).
