= John Hensleigh Allen =

John Hensleigh Allen DL (29 August 1769 – 12 April 1843) was the Whig member of parliament for Pembroke elected at the 1818 United Kingdom general election until the 1826 United Kingdom general election.

He was the son of John Bartlett Allen (1733–1792) a local landowner and colliery owner and his first wife Elizabeth Hensleigh. He had 9 sisters, and his brothers-in-law included Josiah Wedgwood II, Sir James Mackintosh (both Whig MPs), John Wedgwood the horticulturist and Jean Charles Léonard de Sismondi the historian.

He was educated at Westminster School and Trinity College, Cambridge, following his elder brother Lancelot Baugh Allen.

He was High Sheriff of Pembrokeshire in 1809.

He married Gertrude, daughter of Lord Robert Seymour, on 9 November 1812. They had five children:

- Gertrude Elizabeth Allen (died 1824)
- Seymour Phillips Allen (1814–1861)
- Henry George Allen (1815–1908)
- John Hensleigh Allen (1818–1868)
- Isabel Georgina Allen (1820–1914), married George Lort Phillips

Parliament of the United Kingdom
Preceded by John Jones	Member of Parliament for Pembroke; 1818–1826	Succeeded by Hugh Owen Owen
Honorary titles
Preceded by John Colby	High Sheriff of Pembrokeshire; 1808–1809	Succeeded by Charles Allen Philipps
