= Robert Oliver Cunningham =

Scottish naturalist (1841-1918)

Robert Oliver Cunningham (27 March 1841 – 14 July 1918) was a Scottish naturalist.

== Birth and early life ==
Cunningham was born on 27 March 1841, in Prestonpans, the second son of the Rev. William Bruce Cunningham (1806–78), Free Church of Scotland minister in Prestonpans, and Cecilia Margaret Douglas (1813–98), daughter of David Douglas, Lord Reston (1769–1819), the heir of Adam Smith. He was educated at Edinburgh Academy (1851–54), and graduated in medicine at the University of Edinburgh in 1864. He gained a Licentiate of the Royal College of Surgeons of Edinburgh with a thesis on the Solan Goose.

== H.M.S. Nassau ==
In January 1866 he was appointed Professor of Natural History in the Royal Agricultural College, Cirencester, but resigned in June in consequence of being appointed by the Admiralty upon the recommendation of Joseph Dalton Hooker, to collect plants as naturalist on board HMS Nassau under the command of Richard Charles Mayne, then commissioned for the survey of the Straits of Magellan and the west coast of Patagonia. This voyage started on 24 August 1866 from the Thames, and on 18 February 1867 she arrived in Port Stanley in the Falkland Islands to coal, departing again on 2 March, much to Cunningham's regret. They returned to the Falklands in 1868 enabling Cunningham to explore and study the plants and seaweeds on East Falkland returning a third time early in 1869. The Nassau returned to England on 31 July 1869 but Cunningham remained employed by the Navy so that he could write up his natural history notes and his narrative of the voyage, this was published in 1871 as The Natural History of the Straits of Magellan. In all, Cunningham published 18 scientific papers before 1872 his first which was about gannets was his theses but the others were mainly on his observations from voyage of the Nassau. He presented some of these papers to the Zoological Society of London and to the Linnean Society, becoming a fellow of the latter in 1870.

== Queens College ==
In 1871 Cunningham was appointed Professor of Natural History at Queens College, Belfast where he spent the following 31 years as a university teacher. During his time in Belfast he was an enthusiastic naturalist, taught botany, geology and zoology, ran excursions and had museum curation duties. He was not completely happy, complaining of overwork and of missing friends and family in Scotland. He unsuccessfully applied for a post at the University of Aberdeen in 1878. However, Cunningham remained highly regarded in Belfast and became involved in the university's administrative affairs. He was awarded an honorary degree by the Royal University of Ireland. While he was at Queens his mother donated some of the books from the library of her ancestor, Adam Smith, to the college's library.

== Retirement ==
Cunningham gave talks to the Torquay Natural History Society in 1904 but he does not appear to have become a member. He died at Paignton on 14 July 1918.

== Bibliography ==
- Cunningham, Robert Oliver (1871). Notes on the natural history of the Strait of Magellan and west coast of Patagonia made during the voyage of H.M.S. ʻNassau ̓in the years 1866, 67, 68, & 69. Edmonston and Douglas.
