= Richard Mayne (Royal Navy officer) =

Royal Navy Captain, later Admiral and explorer (1835–1892)

Rear-Admiral Richard Mayne CB MP FRGS
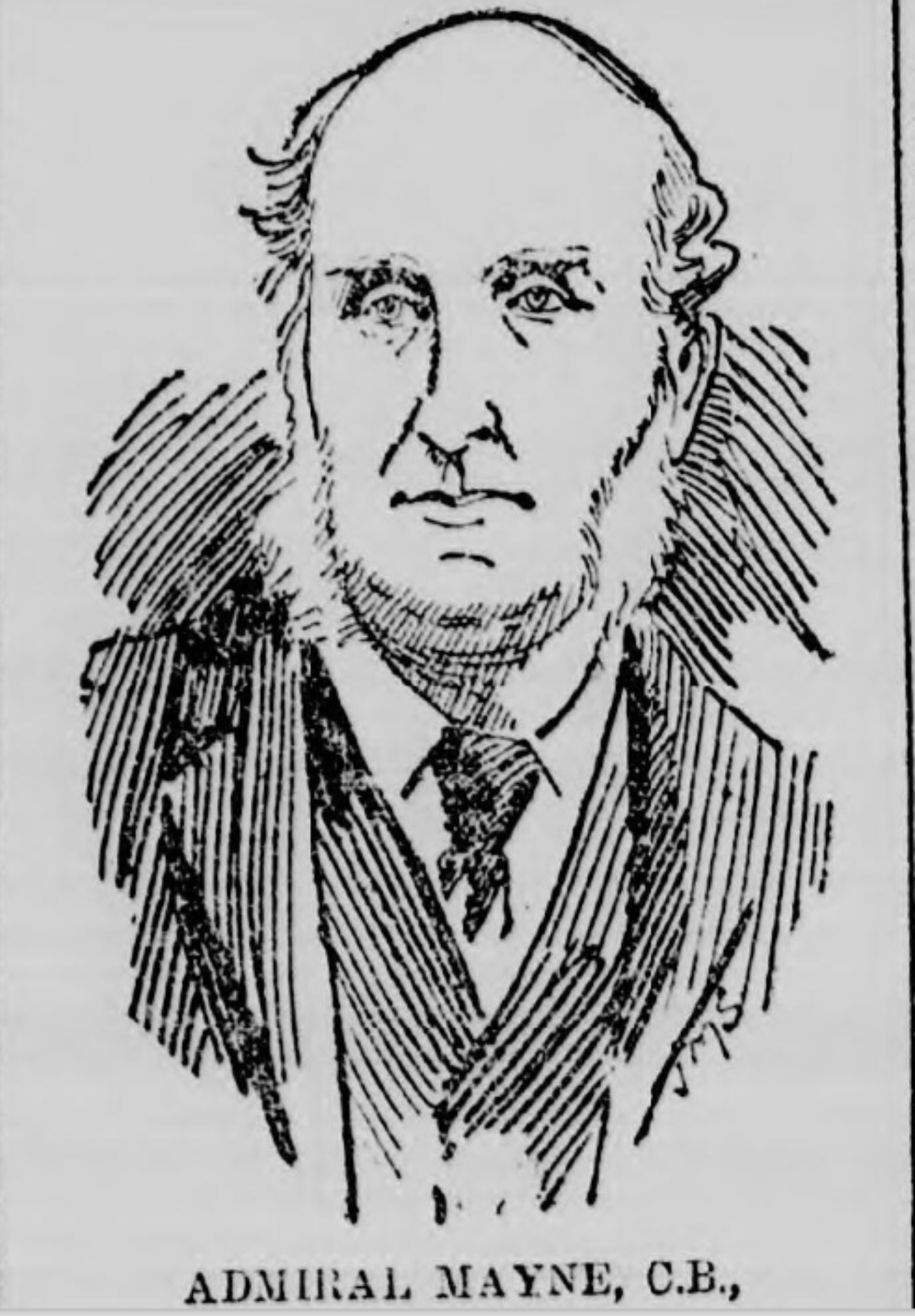
- Born: Richard Charles Mayne; 7 July 1835
- Died: 29 May 1892 (aged 56)

Rear-Admiral Richard Charles Mayne CB FRGS (7 July 1835 – 29 May 1892) was a Royal Navy officer and explorer, who in later life became a Conservative politician.

Richard Mayne was the son of Sir Richard Mayne KCB (the first joint commissioner of the Metropolitan Police) and the grandson of Judge Edward Mayne. Both his father and grandfather were graduates of Trinity College, Dublin. Richard Mayne was educated at Eton. He was a scion of a family that settled at Mount Sedborough in County Fermanagh during the Plantation of Ulster and subsequently at Freame Mount, County Cavan in Ireland.

== Royal Navy career ==
=== Exploration of British Columbia ===
In 1856 Lieutenant Mayne was attached to the Nautical Survey of Vancouver Island and British Columbia. Mayne sailed with Captain George Henry Richards on his expedition in HMS Plumper and also on HMS Hecate to survey the coast of British Columbia (1857–1859), and there came to serve in the Royal Engineers under Colonel Richard Moody and was assigned the exploration and mapping of hitherto unknown parts of the colony. Four years in British Columbia and Vancouver Island. An account of their forests, rivers, coasts, gold fields, and resources for colonisation, his journal of these activities is a classic source of British Columbia history, as are those of his Royal Engineer colleague Lieutenant Henry Spencer Palmer. Mayne Island in the Gulf Islands is named after him, and Hecate Strait for his vessel. For this work, in 1860, he was promoted to Commander and returned to England. In 1862 he was appointed to the command of HMS Eclipse, for service in New Zealand, and took part in the New Zealand Wars until severely wounded in 1863 and invalided home. For these services he was mentioned in despatches and promoted to the rank of Captain; and in 1867 received the Companionship of the Bath.

=== Straits of Magellan expedition ===
Mayne commanded HMS Nassau on the survey expedition to the Straits of Magellan, 1866–9. The naturalist on the voyage was Robert Oliver Cunningham. Charles Darwin requested the Lords of the Admiralty to ask Capt. Mayne to collect several boatloads of fossil bones of extinct species of quadrupeds. Admiral Sulivan had previously discovered an astonishingly rich accumulation of fossil bones not far from the Straits. These remains apparently belonged to a more ancient period, than the collection by Mr Darwin on HMS Beagle and by other naturalists and therefore of great interest to science. Many of these were collected with the aid of Hydrographer Capt. Richards R.N. and deposited in the British Museum.

The Admiralty compiled advice to mariners of the Strait in 1871.

Admiral Mayne was elected a Fellow of the Royal Geographical Society and served on its council. He was the author of Four years in British Columbia and Vancouver Island.

== Marriage ==
In 1870, Captain Mayne married Miss Sabine Dent, a daughter of Sir Thomas Dent (1796–1872) and his wife, Sabine Ellen Robarts, daughter of James Thomas Robarts (1784–1825), another influential opium merchant. Sabine Dent was a relation of Lancelot Dent of Flass House. After his marriage, he only served a short term afloat in command of HMS Invincible. He retired as a Rear-Admiral in 1879.

== Political career ==
After retiring from the Navy, he unsuccessfully contested the Welsh constituency of Pembroke and Haverfordwest as a Conservative at the 1885 general election, being defeated by a narrow margin by the Liberal candidate, H.G. Allen.

In 1886, Allen was among the Liberal MPs who broke with Gladstone over Irish Home Rule. Shortly after the election was announced, Mayne arrived in the constituency launch his campaign. At a meeting at the Masonic Hall in Pembroke, he emphasised that he had consulted with Allen before travelling to the constituency and stated that he had a letter in his possession from Allen confirming his decision to retire.

He was elected as Member of Parliament (MP) there the following year, serving until his death shortly before the 1892 general election.

Parliament of the United Kingdom
Preceded by Henry Allen	Member of Parliament for Pembroke and Haverfordwest; 1886–1892	Succeeded by Charles Allen
