= John Adams (Pembroke MP) =

Welsh politician

- Born: by 1511
- Died: 1571/1575
- Occupation: politician

John Adams (by 1511 – 1571/1575), of Peterchurch in Pembroke and St Petrox, Pembrokeshire, was a Welsh politician.

== Career ==
Adams was a Member of Parliament for Pembroke Boroughs in 1542.
