= Sir Hugh Owen, 2nd Baronet (1641 creation) =

British noble and politician

Sir Hugh Owen, 2nd Baronet (1645–1698) was a Welsh politician who sat in the House of Commons of England at various times between 1676 and 1695.

Owen was the son of Sir Hugh Owen, 1st Baronet of Orielton, Pembrokeshire and his second wife Catharine Lloyd, daughter of Sir Evan Lloyd, of Yale, Denbighshire. He matriculated at Christ Church, Oxford on 7 December 1660, aged 15. In 1670, he succeeded to the baronetcy on the death of his father. He was admitted to Inner Temple in 1672.

He was appointed High Sheriff of Pembrokeshire in 1664. In 1676, he was elected Member of Parliament for Pembroke in a by-election to the Cavalier Parliament. He was elected MP for Pembrokeshire in the two elections of 1679 and in 1681. In 1688 he was appointed Sheriff of Anglesey, but did not act. He was elected MP for Pembrokeshire again in 1689. Owen died at the age of about 54 in Bristol, where there is a monument to him in the church of St Augustine.

Owen married, firstly, his second cousin Anne Owen, daughter and heiress of his paternal uncle, Henry Owen, of Bodowen, with whom he had eight sons and five daughters. He married, secondly, Catharine Anwyl, widow of Lewis Anwyll of Park and daughter of William Griffith of Len. They had no children. He was succeeded by his son Arthur.

Parliament of England
| Preceded by Rowland Laugharne | Member of Parliament for Pembroke; 1676–1679 | Succeeded by Arthur Owen |
| Preceded by John Owen | Member of Parliament for Pembrokeshire; 1679–1681 | Succeeded by William Wogan |
| Preceded by William Barlow | Member of Parliament for Pembrokeshire; 1689–1696 | Succeeded by Sir Arthur Owen |
Baronetage of England
| Preceded by Hugh Owen | Baronet (of Orielton); 1670-1699 | Succeeded by Arthur Owen |
