= Owen baronets =

Set index for Owen baronets

There have been two baronetcies created for persons with the surname Owen, one in the Baronetage of England and one in the Baronetage of the United Kingdom.

- Owen baronets of Orielton (first creation, 1641)
- Owen baronets of Orielton (second creation, 1813)
