= Orielton, Pembrokeshire =

Historic country house near Hundleton in Pembrokeshire, Wales

Coordinates: 51.6528°N 4.9585°W

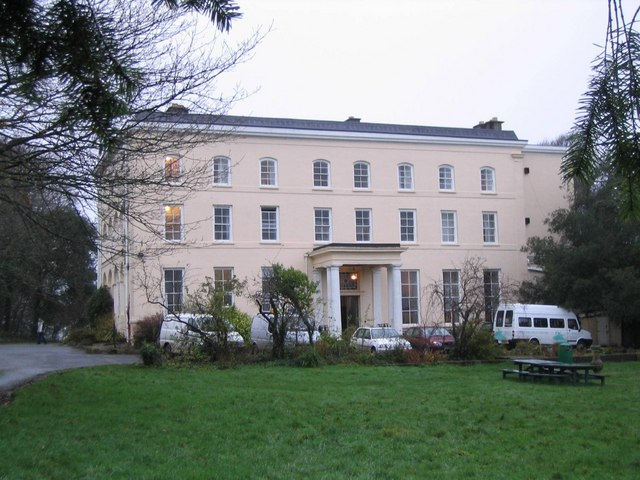
Orielton in 2005

Orielton is a historic country house and estate near Hundleton in Pembrokeshire, Wales. It was the seat of the Owen baronets from the 16th to 19th centuries. It was requisitioned during wartime, and later used as a field studies centre for environmental sciences; it was put up for sale in early 2022.

== History ==
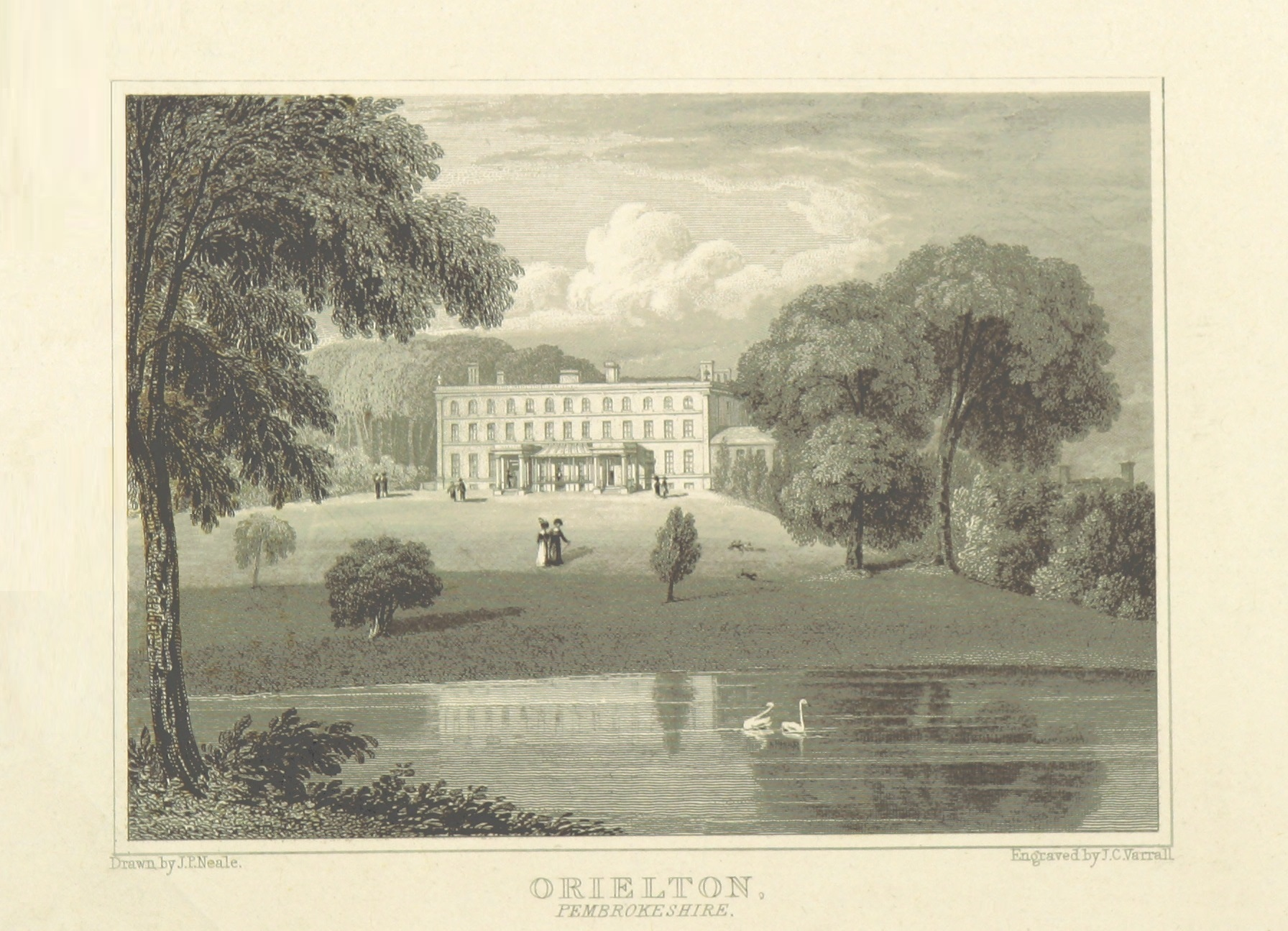
Orielton in 1818

The first known house at Orielton was a fortified manor built by the Wyriott family in about 1200, which was mentioned by the historian Giraldus Cambrensis (c. 1146 – c. 1223). Orielton was the seat of the Owen baronets. The first Owen at Orielton was Sir Hugh Owen, the son of Owen ap Hugh (1518–1613), of Bodeon, near Llangadwaladr, Anglesey. Sir Hugh married Elizabeth Wirriot, who had inherited Orielton from her father George Wirriot. Sir Hugh left Orielton to his grandson, also Sir Hugh Owen (1604–1670), who was awarded the title Baronet of Orielton in 1641. The more recent Orielton House is said to have been built in 1656 and rebuilt in 1734. It passed down in the Owen baronetcy until it was inherited in 1806 by John Lord (1776–1861), a wealthy mineowner and politician, who remodelled the house in 1810 to its current form. Lord changed his surname to Owen, and became a baronet in 1813 when the Orielton baronetcy was recreated for him. At this stage, Owen had considerable wealth; the properties in north Wales had been disposed of in 1808 for nearly £100,000 and his status in Pembrokeshire has been enhanced by the purchase of the Llanstinan estate. In later years, however, his profligacy led him to sell Orielton in 1857, along with other property in Pembrokeshire.

Orielton was requisitioned during the Second World War and used as a base for Australian airmen. In 1954 Orielton was bought by the naturalist and author Ronald Lockley (1903–2000). The estate then covered 260 acres. Lockley used Orielton for biological research, including into the rabbit disease myxomatosis. He wrote The Private Life of the Rabbit whilst at Orielton. In 1977 he wrote Orielton, The Human and Natural History of a Welsh Manor about his time there. Ronald Lockley's son, the palaeontologist Martin Lockley, was brought up in Orielton. In 1963 Orielton was bought by the Field Studies Council, for use as a field studies centre. In 2022 the Field Studies Council offered the house and 118 acres (48 ha) of estate for sale.

== Architecture ==
=== House ===
Orielton is a three-storey mansion in painted stucco. The core of the house may have been created by Sir Hugh Owen (1604–1670) in the late seventeenth century, probably from brick and stone. The house was rebuilt in 1813 by John Owen (né John Lord), (possibly following an earlier rebuilding in 1734). In the later nineteenth century the east front was shortened by five bays. The east front has eight bays with a large central porch with Doric columns. The west front has eleven bays. The interior features a full-height hall with a cantilevered stone staircase. The house is a grade II* listed building.

=== Stables ===
Orielton stables are in wooded parkland, 100m north of the house. Built in the nineteenth century, there is an ornamental entrance block with a courtyard to the year. The stables are a grade II listed building and are now used by the field studies centre for classrooms and laboratories. The stables and its cellars are a roost for lesser horseshoe bats, greater horseshoe bats, brown long-eared bats and whiskered bats, and are registered as a site of special scientific interest.

=== Tower ===
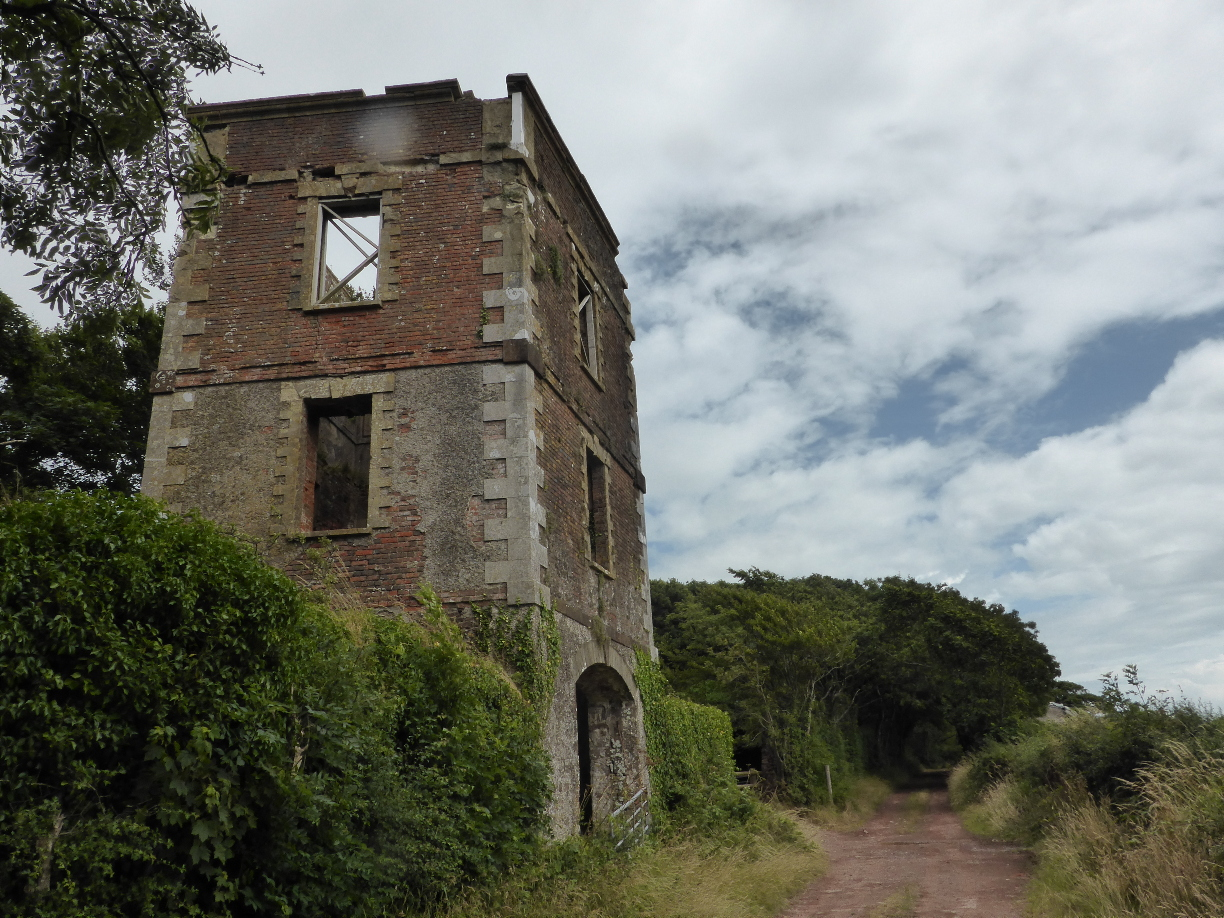
Orielton tower

Orielton tower was built in the eighteenth century in the Georgian style, and originally straddled the entrance to the Orielton estate. The tower is built of brick, with Bath stone dressings. It became derelict in the nineteenth century, when it was described as a banqueting tower. The tower is a grade II* listed building.

=== Brick Hall ===
The Brick Hall at Orielton is an eighteenth-century estate house in a walled garden. Brick buildings of this period are rare locally. The Brick Hall is a grade II listed building, as are adjoining garden walls and dog kennels.

== Estate ==
=== Gardens ===
The house is surrounded by gardens that date from at least the early nineteenth century. There are remains of a nineteenth-century Japanese garden and a walled kitchen garden. An icehouse was installed under the lawn; this has been filled in. The gardens are listed at Grade II on the Cadw/ICOMOS Register of Parks and Gardens of Special Historic Interest in Wales.

=== Field studies centre ===
In 1963 Orielton was bought by the Field Studies Council for use as a field studies centre. The centre provided short residential and non-residential courses and field trips for school and university students and for the general public, and provided a base for researchers. The Oil Pollution Research Unit of the Field Studies Council was established at the centre in 1967. The centre was near the major oil port of Milford Haven.
