= Welsh peers and baronets =

This is an index of Welsh peers and baronets whose primary peerage, life peerage, and baronetcy titles include a Welsh place-name origin or its territorial qualification is within the historic counties of Wales.

Welsh-titled peers derive their titles from a variety of sources. After Llywelyn ap Gruffudd of the House of Aberffraw, the last Welsh Prince of Wales, was killed during the Edwardian Conquest in 1282, the Principality of Wales was divided into English-style counties. Many of the former native titles were abolished, but some of the native Welsh lords were given English titles in exchange for their loyalty. Welsh Law remained in force in the Principality for civil cases, including for inheritance. However, Edward I did reform Welsh succession to introduce male preference primogeniture, a reform which facilitated the inheritance by English marcher lords of Welsh lands.

With the Laws in Wales Acts 1535-1542, Wales was formally annexed by England, with the full implementation of English Common Law for civil cases. Both native Welsh and Marcher lordships were fully incorporated into the English Peerage. Eventually, succeeding peerage divisions emerged. Wales does not have a separate peerage, but Welsh peers are included in the English, Great Britain, and finally the United Kingdom peerages. In 1793 the title "Earl of the Town and County of Carnarvon in the Principality of Wales" was created, the only mention of the "Principality of Wales" in a title. After the deposition by the English parliament in February 1689 of King James II and VII from the thrones of England and Ireland (the Scottish Estates followed suit on 11 April 1689), he and his successors continued to create peers and baronets, which became known as the Jacobite Peerage.

Some lords, the Earl Lloyd-George of Dwyfor, and the Marquess of Anglesey, make their principal seat within Wales, while others, such as the Marquess of Abergavenny have their seat outside Wales.

The flag of the princely House of Aberffraw, first associated with Llywelyn the Great from 1216

== Titles as rendered in the Welsh language ==
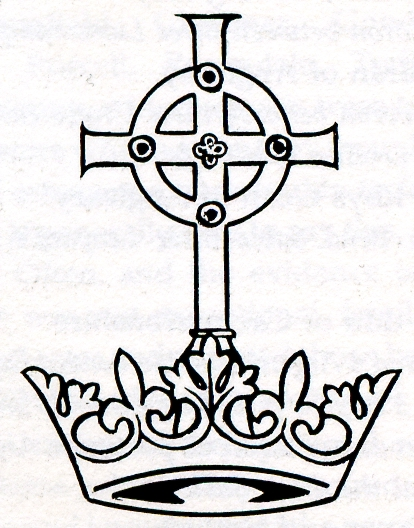
The Cross of Neith atop the Talaith Llywelyn.

| Title | Male singular | Female singular | Domain |
|---|---|---|---|
| Prince | Tywysog | Tywysoges | Tywysogaeth |
| Duke | Duc, Dug | Duces, Duges | Dugaeth |
| Marquess | Ardalydd | Ardalyddes | Ardalyddaeth |
| Earl | Iarll | Iarlles | Iarllaeth |
| Count | Cownt* | Cowntes* | Cowntaeth |
| Viscount | Isiarll | Isiarlles | Isiarllaeth |
| Baron | Barwn | Barwnes | Barwniaeth |
| Baronet | Barwnig | Barwniges | Baronaeth |

  - When referencing continental titles of Earl rankings.

== Royal titles ==
See also Honours of the Principality of Wales

| Title | Creation | Peerage | Other titles |
|---|---|---|---|
| The Prince of Wales | 1267 (Welsh title); 1301 (English title) | Wales; England | Prince of Aberffraw and Lord of Snowdon in the Welsh Principality of Wales, Duke of Rothesay and Earl of Carrick in the Peerage of Scotland, Duke of Cornwall and Earl of Chester in the Peerage of England |

== Ducal titles ==
Currently there are no Welsh ducal titles.

| Title | Creation | Peerage | Other titles |
|---|---|---|---|
| The Duke of Monmouth | 1663 | England | Extinct 1685. Duke of Buccleuch, 1663, Peerage of Scotland |
| The Duke of Powis | 1689 | Jacobite Peerage of England | Extinct 1745. Created for the 1st Marquess of Powis |

== Marquessate titles ==
- This indicates an extant title.

| Title | Creation | Peerage | Selected other titles |
|---|---|---|---|
| The Marquess of Powis | 1687 | England | |
| The Marquess of Montgomery | 1687 | Jacobite Peerage | |
| The Marquess of Carmarthen | 1689 | England | Subsidiary title for the Duke of Leeds |
| The Marquess of Carnarvon | 1719 | Great Britain | Subsidiary title for the Duke of Chandos |
| The Marquess of Anglesey | 1815 | UK | |
| The Marquess of Abergavenny | 1876 | UK | |
| The Marquess of Milford Haven | 1917 | UK | |

== Earldom titles ==
- This indicates an extant title.

| Title | Creation | Peerage | Other titles and notes |
|---|---|---|---|
| The Lord of Glamorgan | 1093, 1217, 1338, 1439; 1449 1489 | England | Based on the former Welsh principality of Morgannwg. The title was 'Lord of Glamorgan' but of comital rank. Abolished with the Laws in Wales Act 1535. |
| The Earl of Pembroke | c. 1135, 1533, 1605 | England | Earl of Montgomery in the Peerage of England. |
| The Lord of Gower | c. 1135 | England | Carved out of the Welsh Gŵyr lordship of the Principality of Deheubarth. The title was "Lord of Gower" but of comital rank. Abolished with the Laws in Wales Act 1535. |
| The Lord of Kilvey | c. 1135 | England | Based on the Welsh commote. Roughly, the parish of Llansamlet on the east bank of the Tawe and part of the Principality of Deheubarth until conquered from it. Abolished with the Laws in Wales Act 1535 and transferred to Glamorgan. |
| The Earl of Montgomery | 1605 | England | Held with Earl of Pembroke since 1630 |
| The Earl of Carnarvon | 1628, 1714, 1793 | England Great Britain | Baron Porchester in the Peerage of Great Britain |
| The Earl of Denbigh | 1622 | England | Earl of Desmond in the Peerage of Ireland |
| The Earl of Conway | 1624 | England | Extinct by 1683 |
| The Earl of Cardigan | 1661 | England | Marquess of Ailesbury in the Peerage of the UK |
| The Earl of Powis | 1674, 1748, 1804 | UK | Viscount Clive in the Peerage of the UK |
| The Earl of Monmouth | 1701 | Jacobite Peerage of England | Extinct 1747 |
| The Earl Talbot | 1761 | Great Britain | Baron Dynevor, of Dynevor in the County of Carmarthen. |
| The Earl of Lisburne | 1776 | Ireland | Viscount Lisburne. Named after the profitable Lisburne mines in Trawsgoed, Ceredigion for the Vaughn family. |
| The Earl Cawdor | 1827 | UK | Viscount Emlyn in the Peerage of the UK; Thane of Cawdor in the Peerage of Scotland |
| The Earl Lloyd-George of Dwyfor | 1945 | UK | Viscount Gwynedd in the Peerage of the UK |
| The Earl of Merioneth | 1947 | UK | Duke of Edinburgh in the Peerage of the UK. Merged with the Crown 2022 |
| The Earl of Snowdon | 1961 | UK | Viscount Linley in the Peerage of the UK |

== Viscountcy titles ==
- This indicates an extant title.

| Title | Creation | Peerage | Other titles and notes |
|---|---|---|---|
| The Viscount Powis | 1687 | England | Subsidiary title for Marquess of Powis |
| The Viscount Montgomery | 1687 | England | Subsidiary title for Marquess of Powis |
| The Viscount Emlyn | 1827 | Great Britain | Earl Cawdor of Castlemartin in the County of Pembroke |
| The Viscount Windsor | 1905 | UK | of St Fagans in the County of Glamorgan. Held as a subsidiary title of the Earl of Plymouth. |
| The Viscount Tredegar | 1905, 1925 | UK | Baron Tredegar 1859, Viscountcy title became extinct by 1962 |
| The Viscount St Davids | 1918 | UK | Baron St Davids in the UK Peerage; Baron Strange de Knokyn, of Hungerford, and of Moleyns in the Peerage of England |
| The Viscount Rhondda | 1918 | UK | Baron Rhondda. Extinct by 1953 |
| The Viscount Gwynedd | 1945 | UK | Earl Lloyd-George of Dwyfor |
| The Viscount Tenby | 1957 | UK | of Bulford in the County of Pembroke |
| The Viscount Tonypandy | 1983 | UK | in the County of Glamorgan. The title became extinct in 1997. |
| The Viscount Severn | 1999 | UK | Earl of Wessex and Earl of Forfar in the Peerage of the UK |

== Barony titles ==
- This indicates an extant title.

| Title | Creation | Peerage | Other titles and notes |
|---|---|---|---|
| The Baron Abergavenny | 1087, 1392 | England | Marquess of Abergavenny |
| The Baron Aberavon | 12th century | England | Created for the former Welsh rulers of Morgannwg, pre-Norman Conquest; the dynasty became subsumed, ruling only the barony of Aberavon. The family and barony became extinct in the 1330s. |
| The Baron of Cymmer-yn-Edeirnion | 1284 | England | Based on lands in the family's possession pre-Edwardian Conquest, recognised in 1370 for the Hughes of Gwerclas descendants. |
| The Baron Glyndyfrdwy | 22 July 1284 | England | Edward I granted the lands of Ial to Gruffudd Fychan, Prince of Powys Fadog, Lord of Dinas Bran (5 February 1278). Lands were forfeited, 7 October 1282. Barony then recreated as Lords Glyndyfrdwy and Cynllaith Owain in northern Powys. Penultimate Baron was the Prince of Wales (Pretender) Owain Glyndwr c. 1400 – 1415. |
| The Baron of Hendwr | 1284 | England | Created for the cousin of the above after they came into the King's Peace. Title confirmed in 1334. |
| The Baroness Grey de Ruthyn | 1324 | England | In abeyance since 1963 |
| The Baron Talbot | 1331, 1733 | Great Britain | Currently in abeyance |
| The Baron Grey of Powys | 1482 | England | In abeyance since 1551 |
| The Baron Powis | 1629 | England | Extinct 1748 |
| The Baron Conwy | 1703 | Great Britain | Marquess of Hertford in the Peerage of England |
| The Baron Newborough | 1716 | Ireland | Marquess of Cholmondeley in the Peerage of Ireland |
| The Baron Cardiff | 1776 | Great Britain | Marquess of Bute in the Peerage of Great Britain |
| The Baron Newborough | 1776 | Ireland | Baronet of Wynn of Bodvean |
| The Baron Milford | 1776, 1847, 1939 | UK | Philipps Baronetcy |
| The Baron Dynevor | 1780 | Great Britain | The Rhys family claim descent from the 15th century Rhys ap Thomas |
| The Baron Gwydyr | 1796 | Great Britain | Through the maternal line, heirs of the Aberffraw legacy through Mary Wynn and her great granddaughter Priscilla Bertie and her descendants to 1915, when the title expired. |
| The Baron Mostyn | 1831 | UK | Baronet Mostyn of Pengwerra |
| The Baron Raglan | 1852 | UK | of Raglan in the County of Monmouth |
| The Baron Llanover | 1859 | UK | Augusta Hall, Baroness Llanover was Welsh heiress, best known as a patron of the arts. Title became extinct in 1867 |
| The Baron Tredegar | 1859 | UK | Baronet Morgan of Tredegar 1792 Title became extinct in 1962 |
| The Baron Aberdare | 1873 | UK | |
| The Baron Harlech | 1876 | UK | of Harlech in the County of Merioneth |
| The Baron Swansea | 1893 | UK | of Singleton in the County of Glamorgan |
| The Baron Glanusk | 1899 | UK | Baronet of Bailey |
| The Baron Grenfell | 1902 | UK | of Kilvey in the County of Glamorgan |
| The Baron St. Davids | 1908 | UK | Viscount St Davids in the Peerage of the UK |
| The Baron Rhondda | 1916 | UK | of Llanwern in the County of Monmouth. Extinct by 1918, but the Viscountcy was inherited by his daughter. |
| The Baron Colwyn | 1917 | UK | of Colwyn Bay in the County of Denbigh, and the Smith baronets (created in 1912) |
| The Baron Clwyd | 1919 | UK | of Abergele in the County of Denbigh |
| The Baron Trevethin | 1921 | UK | of Blaengawney in the County of Monmouth |
| The Baron Kylsant | 1923 | UK | Extinct 1927 |
| The Baron Lloyd | 1925 | UK | Extinct with the second Baron Lloyd in 1985. |
| The Baron Davies | 1932 | UK | of Llandinam in the County of Montgomery |
| The Baron Llewellin | 1945 | UK | Extinct by 1957 |
| The Baron Trefgarne | 1947 | UK | of Cleddau in the County of Pembroke |
| The Baron Brecon | 1958 | UK | Extinct by 1975, though survived by daughter, Janet Lewis |

=== Welsh life peers ===
==== Territorial qualification within Wales ====
This is an index of Welsh life peers whose primary territorial qualification is within the historic counties of Wales. Some may have subsidiary titles outside Wales.

| Name and title | Territorial qualification | Creation | Extinction |
|---|---|---|---|
| James Atkin, Baron Atkin | of Aberdovey in the County of Merioneth | 1928 | 1944 |
| Daniel Granville West, Baron Granville-West | of Pontypool in the County of Monmouth | 1958 | 1984 |
| John Morris, Baron Morris of Borth-y-Gest | of Borth-y-Gest in the County of Caernarvon | 1960 | 1979 |
| Arthur Champion, Baron Champion | of Pontypridd in the County of Glamorgan | 1962 | 1985 |
| Alun Jones, Baron Chalfont | of Llantarnam in the County of Monmouth | 1964 | 2020 |
| William Wynne-Jones, Baron Wynne-Jones | of Abergele in the County of Denbigh | 1964 | 1982 |
| Arwyn Davies, Baron Arwyn | of Glais in the County of Glamorgan | 1964 | 1978 |
| Arthur Moyle, Baron Moyle | of Llanidloes in the County of Montgomeryshire | 1965 | 1974 |
| Thomas Jones, Baron Maelor | of Rhosllanerchrugog in the County of Denbigh | 1966 | 1984 |
| William David Evans, Baron Energlyn | of Caerphilly in the County of Glamorgan | 1968 | 1985 |
| Eirene White, Baroness White | of Rhymney in the County of Monmouth | 1970 | 1970 |
| John Brayley, Baron Brayley | of the City of Cardiff in the County of Glamorgan | 1973 | 1977 |
| Rhys Lloyd, Baron Lloyd of Kilgerran | of Llanwenog in the County of Cardigan | 1973 | 1991 |
| Elwyn Jones, Baron Elwyn-Jones | of Llanelli in the County of Carmarthen | 1974 | 1989 |
| Goronwy Roberts, Baron Goronwy-Roberts | of Caernarvon and of Ogwen in the County of Caernarvon | 1974 | 1981 |
| Elfed Davies, Baron Davies of Penrhys | of Rhondda in the County of Mid Glamorgan | 1974 | 1992 |
| Edmund Davies, Baron Edmund-Davies | of Aberpennar in the County of Mid Glamorgan | 1974 | 1992 |
| Gordon Parry, Baron Parry | of Neyland in the County of Dyfed | 1976 | 2004 |
| Morrice James, Baron Saint Brides | of Hasguard in the County of Dyfed | 1977 | 1989 |
| John Leonard, Baron Leonard | of the City of Cardiff in the County of South Glamorgan | 1978 | 1983 |
| John Brooks, Baron Brooks of Tremorfa | of Tremorfa in the County of South Glamorgan | 1979 | 2016 |
| Emlyn Hooson, Baron Hooson | of Montgomery in the County of Powys | 1979 | 2012 |
| Jean McFarlane, Baroness McFarlane of Llandaff | of Llandaff in the County of South Glamorgan | 1979 | 2012 |
| David Gibson-Watt, Baron Gibson-Watt | of the Wye in the District of Radnor | 1979 | 2002 |
| Elystan Morgan, Baron Elystan-Morgan | of Aberteifi in the County of Dyfed | 1981 | 2021 |
| Gwilym Prys Davies, Baron Prys Davies | of Llanegryn in the County of Gwynedd | 1983 | 2017 |
| Hugh Griffiths, Baron Griffiths | of Govilon in the County of Gwent | 1985 | 2015 |
| Charles Williams, Baron Williams of Elvel | of Llansantffraed in Elvel in the County of Powys | 1985 | 2019 |
| Peter Thomas, Baron Thomas of Gwydir | of Llanrwst in the County of Gwynedd | 1987 | 2008 |
| James Callaghan, Baron Callaghan of Cardiff | of the City of Cardiff in the County of Glamorgan | 1987 | 2005 |
| Nicholas Edwards, Baron Crickhowell | of Pont Esgob in the Black Mountains and in the County of Powys | 1987 | 2018 |
| Peter Rees, Baron Rees | of Goytre in the County of Gwent | 1987 | 2008 |
| Roy Jenkins, Baron Jenkins of Hillhead | of Pontypool in the County of Gwent | 1987 | 2002 |
| Brian Morris, Baron Morris of Castle Morris | of St Dogmaels in the County of Dyfed | 1990 | 2001 |
| Daphne Park, Baroness Park | of Monmouth in the County of Monmouth and of Broadway in the County of Hereford and Worcester | 1990 | 2010 |
| Ivor Richard, Baron Richard | of Ammanford in the County of Dyfed | 1990 | 2018 |
| Brian Griffiths, Baron Griffiths of Fforestfach | of Fforestfach in the County of Glamorgan | 1991 | Current |
| Dafydd Elis-Thomas, Baron Elis-Thomas | of Nant Conwy in the County of Gwynedd | 1992 | 2025 |
| Gareth Williams, Baron Williams | of Mostyn in the County of Flintshire and of Great Tew in the County of Oxfordshire | 1992 | 2003 |
| Thomas Bingham, Baron Bingham of Cornhill | of Boughrood in the County of Powys | 1996 | 2010 |
| Garfield Davies, Baron Davies | of Coity in the County of Glamorgan | 1997 | 2019 |
| Wyn Roberts, Baron Roberts of Conwy | of Talyfan in the County of Gwynedd | 1997 | 2013 |
| Alex Carlile, Baron Carlile | of Berriew in the County of Powys | 1999 | Current |
| Anita Gale, Baroness Gale | of Blaenrhondda in the County of Mid Glamorgan | 1999 | Current |
| Julian Grenfell, Baron Grenfell of Kilvey | of Kilvey in the County of Swansea | 2000 | Current |
| Kenneth O. Morgan, Baron Morgan | of Aberdyfi in the County of Gwynedd | 2000 | Current |
| Ilora Finlay, Baroness Finlay | of Llandaff in the County of Glamorgan | 2001 | Current |
| Barry Jones, Baron Jones | of Deeside in the County of Clwyd | 2001 | Current |
| Richard Livsey, Baron Livsey | of Talgarth in the County of Powys | 2001 | 2010 |
| John Morris, Baron Morris of Aberavon | of Aberavon in the County of West Glamorgan | 2001 | Current |
| Peter Temple-Morris, Baron Temple-Morris | of Llandaff in the County of South Glamorgan | 2001 | 2018 |
| Leslie John Griffiths, Baron Griffiths of Burry Port | of Pembrey and Burry Port in the County of Dyfed | 2004 | Current |
| Delyth Morgan, Baroness Morgan of Drefelin | of Drefelin in the County of Dyfed | 2004 | Current |
| Roger Roberts, Baron Roberts of Llandudno | of Llandudno in the County of Gwynedd | 2004 | Current |
| Ted Rowlands, Baron Rowlands | of Merthyr Tydfil and of Rhymney in the County of Mid Glamorgan | 2004 | Current |
| Alan Howarth, Baron Howarth of Newport | of Newport in the County of Gwent | 2005 | Current |
| Neil Kinnock, Baron Kinnock of Bedwellty | of Bedwellty in the County of Gwent | 2005 | Current |
| Donald Anderson, Baron Anderson of Swansea | of Swansea in the County of West Glamorgan | 2005 | Current |
| Maggie Jones, Baroness Jones of Whitchurch | of Whitchurch in the County of South Glamorgan | 2006 | Current |
| David Rowe-Beddoe, Baron Rowe-Beddoe | of Kilgetty in the County of Dyfed | 2006 | 2023 |
| Richard Harries, Baron Harries of Pentregarth | of Ceinewydd in the County of Dyfed | 2006 | Current |
| Mervyn Davies, Baron Davies of Abersoch | of Abersoch in the County of Gwynedd | 2009 | Current |
| Glenys Kinnock, Baroness Kinnock of Holyhead | of Holyhead in the County of Ynys Môn | 2009 | 2023 |
| Mike German, Baron German | of Llanfrechfa in the County Borough of Torfaen | 2010 | Current |
| Don Touhig, Baron Touhig | of Islwyn and Glansychan in the County of Gwent | 2010 | Current |
| Michael Williams, Baron Williams of Baglan | of Neath Port Talbot in Glamorgan | 2010 | 2017 |
| Dafydd Wigley, Baron Wigley | of Caernarfon in the County of Gwynedd | 2011 | Current |
| Rowan Williams, Baron Williams of Oystermouth | of Oystermouth in the City and County of Swansea | 2013 | Current |
| Nicholas Bourne, Baron Bourne of Aberystwyth | of Aberystwyth in the County of Ceredigion and of Wethersfield in the County of Essex | 2013 | Current |
| Christine Humphreys, Baroness Humphreys | of Llanrwst in the County of Conwy | 2013 | Current |
| John Thomas, Baron Thomas of Cwmgiedd | of Cwmgiedd in the County of Powys | 2013 | Current |
| Robert Rogers, Baron Lisvane | of Blakemere in the County of Herefordshire and of Lisvane in the City and County of Cardiff | 2014 | Current |
| Stephen Gilbert, Baron Gilbert of Panteg | of Panteg in the County of Monmouthshire | 2015 | Current |
| Paul Murphy, Baron Murphy of Torfaen | of Abersychan in the County of Gwent | 2015 | Current |
| Peter Hain, Baron Hain | of Neath in the County of West Glamorgan | 2015 | Current |
| Byron Davies, Baron Davies of Gower | of Gower in the County of Swansea | 2019 | Current |
| Debbie Wilcox, Baroness Wilcox of Newport | of Newport in the City of Newport | 2019 | Current |
| Claire Fox, Baroness Fox of Buckley | of Buckley in the County of Flintshire | 2020 | Current |
| David Wolfson, Baron Wolfson of Tredegar | of Tredegar in the County of Gwent | 2020 | Current |
| Kay Swinburne, Baroness Swinburne | of Llandysul in the County of Ceredigion | 2023 | Current |
| Carmen Smith, Baroness Smith of Llanfaes | of Llanfaes in the County of Ynys Môn | 2024 | Current |
| Richard Hermer, Baron Hermer | of Penylan in the City of Cardiff | 2024 | Current |
| David Hanson, Baron Hanson of Flint | of Flint in the County of Flintshire | 2024 | Current |
| Carwyn Howell Jones, Baron Jones of Penybont | of Penybont in the County of Pen-y-bont ar Ogwr | 2025 | Current |
| Kevin Brennan, Baron Brennan of Canton | of Canton in the City of Cardiff | 2025 | Current |
| Simon Hart, Baron Hart of Tenby | of Lampeter Velfrey in the County of Pembrokeshire | 2025 | Current |
| David Isaac, Baron Isaac | of Abergavenny in the County of Monmouth | 2026 | Current |
| Jasset 7th Baron Harlech, Baron Harlech of Glyn Cywarch | of Glyn Cywarch in the County of Merioneth | 2026 | Current |

==== Territorial qualification outside Wales ====
This is a list of Welsh life peers whose territorial qualification is outside Wales, with no qualification within Wales.

| Name and title | Territorial qualification | Creation | Extinction |
|---|---|---|---|
| Geoffrey Howe, Baron Howe of Aberavon | of Tandridge in the County of Surrey | 1992 | 2015 |
| Michael Heseltine, Baron Heseltine | of Thenford in the County of Northamptonshire | 2001 | Current |
| Richard Wilson, Baron Wilson of Dinton | of Dinton in the County of Buckinghamshire | 2002 | Current |

== Baronetcy titles ==
A baronet (traditional abbreviation Bart, modern abbreviation Bt) or the rare female equivalent, a baronetess (abbreviation Btss), is the holder of a hereditary title awarded by the British Crown known as a baronetcy.

The name baronet is a diminutive of the peerage title baron. The rank of a baronet is between that of a baron and a knight; it has never entitled the bearer to a seat in the House of Lords, but it is hereditary.

| Baronetcy | Territorial qualification | Creation / extinction | Other titles/notes |
|---|---|---|---|
| Philipps | of Picton Castle in the County of Pembroke | 1661 | Viscount St Davids |
| Wynn | of Gwydir in the County of Caernarfon | 1611 / 1719 | |
| Stradling | of St Donats in the County of Glamorgan | 1611 / 1738 | |
| Salusbury | of Lleweni in the County of Denbigh | 1619 / 1684 | |
| Williams | of Vaynol in the County of Carnarvon | 1622 / 1696 | |
| Williams | of Llangibby in the County of Monmouth | 1642 / 1753 | |
| Williams | of Guernevet in the County of Brecon | 1644 / 1695 | |
| Williams-Bulkeley | of Penrhyn in the County of Caernarfon | 1661 | |
| Williams-Wynn | of Gray's Inn in Middlesex | 1688 | |
| Williams | of Edwinsford in the County of Carmarthen | 1707 / 1745 | |
| Bayly | of Plas Newydd in the County of Anglesey | 1730 | Marquess of Anglesey |
| Wynn | of Bodvean in the county of Caernafonshire | 1742 | Baron Newborough |
| Mostyn | of Pengwerra in the County of Flint | 1778 | Baron Mostyn |
| Morgan | of Tredegar in the County of Monmouth | 1792 | Baron Tredegar |
| Salusbury | of Llanwern in the County of Monmouth | 1795 / 1868 | |
| Williams | of Bodelwyddan in the County of Flint | 1798 | Williams-Wynn Baronets of Gray's Inn |
| Bailey | of Glanusk Park in the County of Brecon | 1852 | Baron Glanusk |
| Vivian | of Singleton, in the County of Glamorgan | 1882 | Baron Swansea |
| Ellis-Nanney | of Gwynfryn and Cefneuddwr in the counties of Caernarfon and Merioneth | 1897 / 1920 | |
| Williams | of Castell Deudraeth, and Borthwen in the County of Merioneth | 1909 | |
| Smith | of Colwyn Bay, in the County of Denbigh | 1912 | Baron Colwyn |
| Rhys-Williams | of Miskin in the County of Glamorgan | 1918 | |
| Philipps | of Llanstephan in the County of Radnor | 1919 | Baron Milford |
| Llewellyn | of Bwlffa, Aberdare in the County of Glamorgan | 1922 | |
| Williams | of Glynwr in the County of Carmarthen | 1935 / 1959 | |
| Williams | of Cilgeraint in the County of Caernarfon | 1953 | |
| Llewellyn | of Baglan, in the County of Glamorgan | 1959 | |

== See also ==
- List of family seats of Welsh nobility
- British nobility
- Peerage, an exposition of great detail
- Peerage of England
- Peerage of Scotland
- Peerage of Ireland
- History of the Peerage
- Gentry
- Landed gentry
- Forms of address in the United Kingdom
- British Honours System
