= Richard Philipps, 1st Baron Milford (second creation) =

Welsh landowner and Whig politician

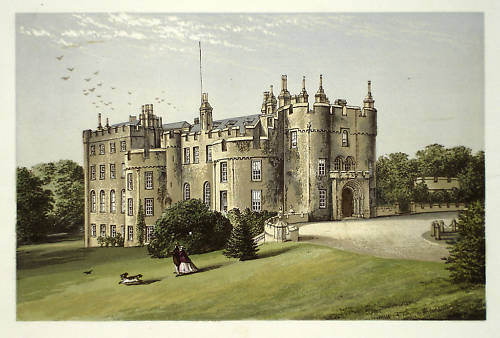
Engraving of Picton Castle, the seat of Lord Milford.

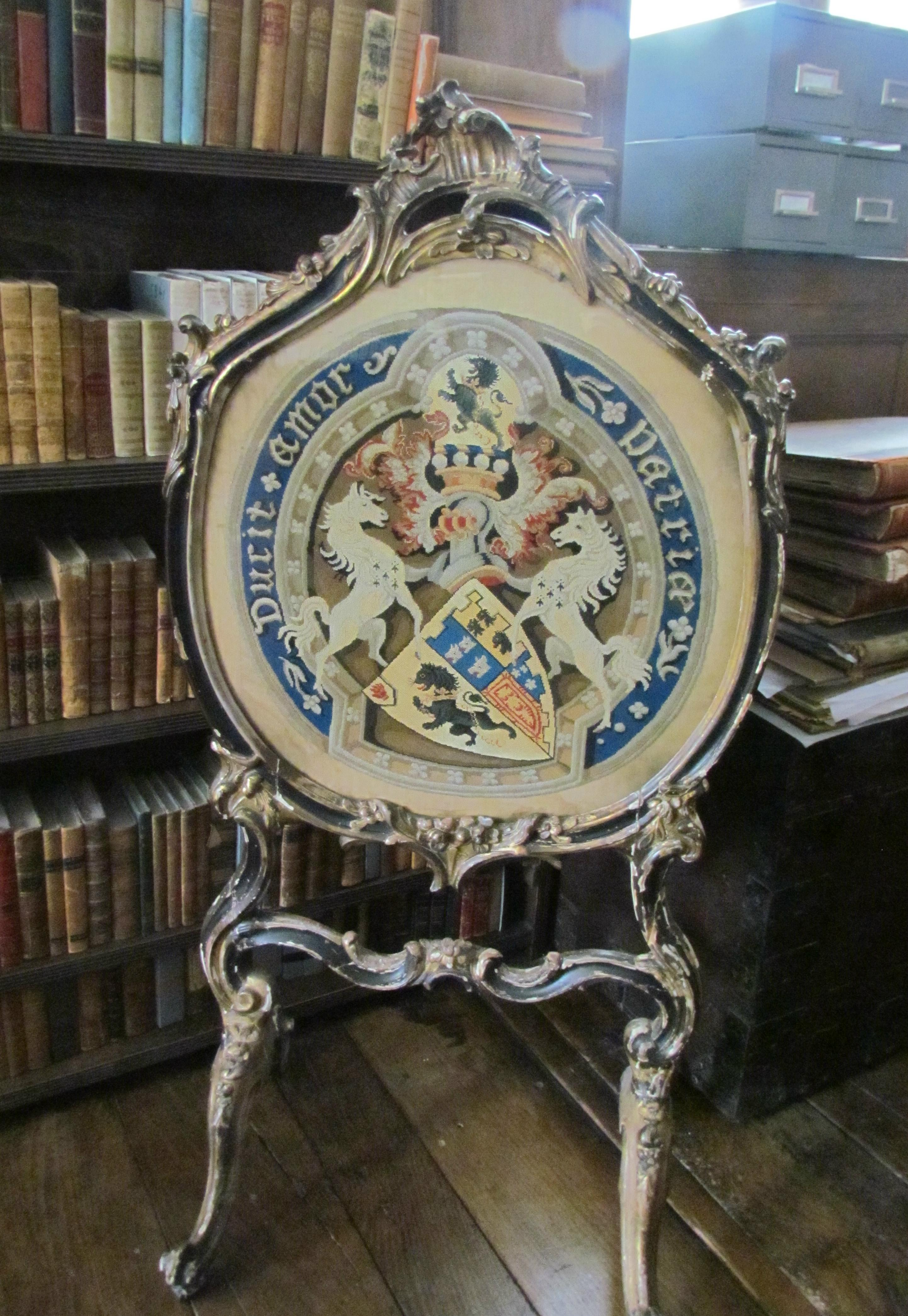
Arms of Richard Philipps, 1st Baron Milford: Argent a lion rampant sable ducally gorged with a chain reflexed over the back or (Philipps), with canton of a baronet, impaling Gordon, of four quarters, for his first wife. Fire screen in the library at Baddesley Clinton House

Richard Bulkeley Philipps Philipps, 1st Baron Milford (7 June 1801 – 3 January 1857), known as Richard Grant until 1823 and as Sir Richard Philipps, Bt, from 1828 to 1847, was a Welsh landowner and Whig politician.

== Background ==
Born Richard Bulkeley Philipps Grant, he was the son of John Grant and Mary Philippa Artemisia, daughter of James Child and Mary Philippa Artemisia, daughter of Bulkeley Philipps, third son of Sir John Philipps, 4th Baronet, of Picton Castle. Bulkeley Phillips was the brother of Sir Erasmus Philipps, 5th Baronet and Sir John Philipps, 6th Baronet and the uncle of Sir Richard Philipps, 7th Baronet, who was created Baron Milford in 1776.

== Public life ==
On the death of his cousin Lord Milford in 1823 and with his son, John Philipps, considered dead since 1805, Grant succeeded to the substantial Philipps estates in Wales, including Picton Castle (the baronetcy was passed on to a more distant male heir of Lord Milford; see Viscount St Davids), and assumed the surname of Philipps in lieu of his patronymic. The following year he was appointed Lord-Lieutenant of Haverfordwest in succession to Lord Milford, which he remained until his death.

== Political career ==
In 1826 he was returned to the House of Commons as the Member of Parliament (MP) for Haverfordwest, a seat he held until 1835, and again between 1837 and 1847. He was created a Baronet, of Picton Castle in the County of Pembroke, in 1828, and raised to the peerage as Baron Milford, of Picton Castle in the County of Pembroke, in 1847, a revival of the barony which had become extinct on his cousin's death in 1823.

== Family ==
Lord Milford was twice married. He married firstly Eliza, daughter of John Gordon, of Hanwell, in 1824. After her death in 1852 he married secondly Lady Anne Jane, daughter of William Howard, 4th Earl of Wicklow, in 1854. There were no children from the two marriages and both titles became extinct on Lord Milford's death in January 1857, aged 55. His estates passed to his half-brother Reverend James Henry Alexander Gwyther, who assumed the surname of Philipps. James's daughter Mary Philippa married Charles Edward Gregg, who assumed the surname of Philipps and was created a Baronet, of Picton, in 1887 (see Philipps Baronets). Lady Milford died in 1909.

Parliament of the United Kingdom
Preceded by William Henry Scourfield	Member of Parliament for Haverfordwest; 1826–1835	Succeeded by William Henry Scourfield
Preceded by William Henry Scourfield	Member of Parliament for Haverfordwest; 1837–1847	Succeeded by John Evans
Honorary titles
Preceded by The Lord Milford	Lord-Lieutenant of Haverfordwest; 1824–1857	Succeeded by Sir John Philipps-Scourfield, Bt
Baronetage of the United Kingdom
New creation	Baronet (of Picton Castle); 1828–1857	Extinct
Preceded by Price baronets	Philipps baronets of Picton Castle; 13 February 1828	Succeeded by Ricketts baronets
Peerage of the United Kingdom
New creation	Baron Milford; 1847–1857	Extinct
