= Peerage of England =

Ranks of nobility in the Kingdom of England before the Act of Union in 1707

The Peerage of England comprises all peerages created in the Kingdom of England before the Act of Union in 1707. From that year, the Peerages of England and Scotland were closed to new creations, and new peers were created in a single Peerage of Great Britain. There are five peerages in the United Kingdom in total. English Peeresses obtained their first seats in the House of Lords under the Peerage Act 1963 from which date until the passage of the House of Lords Act 1999 all Peers of England could sit in the House of Lords.

As of September 2025, there are 93 English peers: 11 dukes (including one royal duke), one marquess, 26 earls, three viscounts and 52 barons (counting peers with a higher title in one of other peerages).

The ranks of the English peerage are, in descending order, duke, marquess, earl, viscount, and baron. While most newer English peerages descend only in the male line, many of the older ones (particularly older baronies) can descend through women.

Baronets, while holders of hereditary titles, as such are not peers and not entitled to stand for election in the House of Lords. Knights, dames and holders of other non-hereditary orders, decorations, and medals are also not peers.

The following tables only show peerages still in existence. For lists of every peerage created at a particular rank, including extinct, dormant, and abeyant peerages, see:

- List of dukedoms in the peerages of Britain and Ireland
- List of marquessates in the peerages of Britain and Ireland
- List of earldoms
- List of viscountcies in the peerages of Britain and Ireland
- List of baronies in the peerages of Britain and Ireland

Each peer is listed only by their highest English title. Peers known by a higher title in one of the other peerages are shown in blue, and peers with more than one title of the same rank in the Peerage of England are shown in orange.

== Dukes in the Peerage of England ==
Subsidiary title

| Title | Creation | Other dukedom or higher titles |
|---|---|---|
| Duke of Cornwall | 1337 | Usually Prince of Wales as the heir to the British throne; Duke of Rothesay (Scotland) |
| Duke of Norfolk (Note: As Premier Duke of England) | 1483 | — |
| Duke of Somerset | 1547 | — |
| Duke of Richmond | 1675 | Duke of Gordon (UK); Duke of Lennox (Scotland); Duke of Aubigny (France) |
| Duke of Grafton | 1675 | — |
| Duke of Beaufort | 1682 | — |
| Duke of St Albans | 1684 | — |
| Duke of Bedford | 1694 | — |
| Duke of Devonshire | 1694 | — |
| Duke of Marlborough | 1702 | — |
| Duke of Rutland | 1703 | — |

== Marquesses in the Peerage of England ==
Subsidiary title

| Title | Creation | Other marquessate or higher titles |
|---|---|---|
| Marquess of Winchester (Note: As Premier Marquess of England) | 1551 | — |
| Marquess of Worcester | 1643 | Duke of Beaufort (England) |
| Marquess of Tavistock | 1694 | Duke of Bedford (England) |
| Marquess of Hartington | 1694 | Duke of Devonshire (England) |
| Marquess of Blandford | 1702 | Duke of Marlborough (England) |
| Marquess of Granby | 1703 | Duke of Rutland (England) |

== Earls in the Peerage of England ==
- Subsidiary title
- Holds more than one earldom in the Peerage of England

| Title | Creation | Other earldom or higher titles |
|---|---|---|
| Earl of Shrewsbury (Note: As Premier Earl of England) | 1442 | Earl Talbot (GB); Earl of Waterford (Ireland) |
| Earl of Derby | 1485 | — |
| Earl of Huntingdon | 1529 | — |
| Earl of Pembroke | 1551 | Earl of Montgomery (England) |
| Earl of Devon | 1553 | — |
| Earl of Lincoln | 1572 | — |
| Earl of Suffolk | 1603 | Earl of Berkshire (England) |
| Earl of Exeter | 1605 | Marquess of Exeter (UK) |
| Earl of Salisbury | 1605 | Marquess of Salisbury (GB) |
| Earl of Montgomery | 1605 | Held with the Earl of Pembroke (England) |
| Earl of Northampton | 1618 | Marquess of Northampton (UK) |
| Earl of Denbigh | 1622? | Earl of Desmond (Ireland) |
| Earl of Westmorland | 1624 | — |
| Earl of Manchester | 1626 | Duke of Manchester (GB) |
| Earl of Berkshire | 1626 | Held with the Earl of Suffolk (England) |
| Earl of Lindsey | 1626 | Earl of Abingdon (England) |
| Earl of Winchilsea | 1628 | Earl of Nottingham (England) |
| Earl of Sandwich | 1660 | — |
| Earl of Essex | 1661 | — |
| Earl of Carlisle | 1661 | — |
| Earl of Doncaster | 1663 | Duke of Buccleuch and Queensberry (Scotland) |
| Earl of Shaftesbury | 1672 | — |
| Earl of Nottingham | 1681 | Held with the Earl of Winchilsea (England) |
| Earl of Abingdon | 1682 | Held with the Earl of Lindsey (England) |
| Earl of Portland | 1689 | — |
| Earl of Scarbrough | 1690 | — |
| Earl of Albemarle | 1697 | — |
| Earl of Coventry | 1697 | — |
| Earl of Jersey | 1697? | — |
| Earl of Cholmondeley | 1706 | Marquess of Cholmondeley (UK) |

== Viscounts in the Peerage of England ==
- Subsidiary title

| Title | Creation | Other viscountcy or higher titles |
|---|---|---|
| Viscount Hereford (Note: As Premier Viscount of England) | 1550 | — |
| Viscount Townshend | 1682 | Marquess Townshend (GB) |
| Viscount Weymouth | 1682 | Marquess of Bath (GB) |

== Barons and baronesses in the Peerage of England ==
- Subsidiary title
- Holds more than one barony in the Peerage of England
- Subsidiary title and holds more than one barony in the Peerage of England

| Title | Creation | Other barony or higher titles |
|---|---|---|
| Baron de Ros (Note: As Premier Baron of England) | 1264 | — |
| Baron le Despencer | 1264 | Viscount Falmouth (GB) |
| Baron Mowbray | 1283 | Baron Segrave and Baron Stourton (England) |
| Baron Hastings | 1295 | — |
| Baron Furnivall | 1295 | — |
| Baron FitzWalter | 1295 | — |
| Baron Segrave | 1295 | Baron Mowbray and Baron Stourton (England) |
| Baron Clinton | 1299 | — |
| Baron De La Warr | 1299 | Earl De La Warr (GB) |
| Baron de Clifford | 1299 | — |
| The Baron Strange | 1299 | Viscount St Davids (UK); Held with Baron Hungerford and Baron de Moleyns (England) |
| Baron Zouche | 1308 | — |
| Baroness Willoughby de Eresby | 1313 | — |
| Baron Strabolgi | 1318 | — |
| Baroness Dacre | 1321 | — |
| Baron Darcy de Knayth | 1332 | — |
| Baron Cromwell | 1375 | — |
| Baron Camoys | 1383 | — |
| Baron Grey of Codnor | 1397 | — |
| Baron Berkeley | 1421 | Lord Gueterbock for Life in the Peerage of the United Kingdom |
| Baron Hungerford | 1426 | Viscount St Davids (UK); Held with Baron Strange and Baron de Moleyns (England) |
| Baron Latymer | 1432 | — |
| Baron Dudley | 1440 | — |
| Baron de Moleyns | 1445 | Viscount St Davids (UK); Held with Baron Strange and Baron Hungerford (England) |
| Baron Saye and Sele | 1447 | — |
| The Baron Stourton | 1448 | Baron Mowbray and Baron Segrave (England) |
| Baroness Berners | 1455 | — |
| Baron Herbert | 1461 | — |
| Baron Willoughby de Broke | 1491 | — |
| Baron Vaux of Harrowden | 1523 | — |
| Baroness Braye | 1529 | — |
| Baron Windsor | 1529 | Earl of Plymouth (UK) |
| Baron Burgh | 1529 | — |
| Baron Wharton | 1544 | — |
| Baron Howard of Effingham | 1554 | Earl of Effingham (UK) |
| Baron St John of Bletso | 1559 | — |
| Baron Howard de Walden | 1597 | — |
| Baron Petre | 1603 | — |
| Baron Clifton | 1608 | Earl of Darnley (Ireland) |
| Baron Dormer | 1615 | — |
| Baron Teynham | 1616 | — |
| Baron Brooke | 1621 | Earl Brooke and Earl of Warwick (GB) |
| Baron Craven | 1626 | Earl of Craven (GB) |
| Baron Strange | 1628 | — |
| Baron Stafford | 1640 | — |
| Baron Byron | 1643 | — |
| Baron Ward | 1644 | Earl of Dudley (UK) |
| Baron Lucas | 1663 | |
| Baroness Arlington | 1665 | — |
| Baron Clifford of Chudleigh | 1672 | — |
| Baron Guilford | 1683 | Earl of Guilford (GB) |
| Baron Waldegrave | 1683 | Earl Waldegrave (GB) |
| Baron Barnard | 1698 | — |
| Baron Guernsey | 1703 | Earl of Aylesford (GB) |
| Baron Gower | 1703 | Duke of Sutherland (UK) |
| Baron Conway | 1703 | Marquess of Hertford (GB) |
| Baron Hervey | 1703 | Marquess of Bristol (UK) |

== See also ==
- British Honours System
- British nobility
- Forms of address in the United Kingdom
- Gentry
- History of the Peerage
- Landed gentry
- Baronetages of England, Nova Scotia, Great Britain, and the United Kingdom
- Peerage, an exposition of great detail
- Peerage of Ireland
- Peerage of Scotland
- Welsh peers and baronets
