= Sir John Philipps, 6th Baronet =

British politician and lawyer

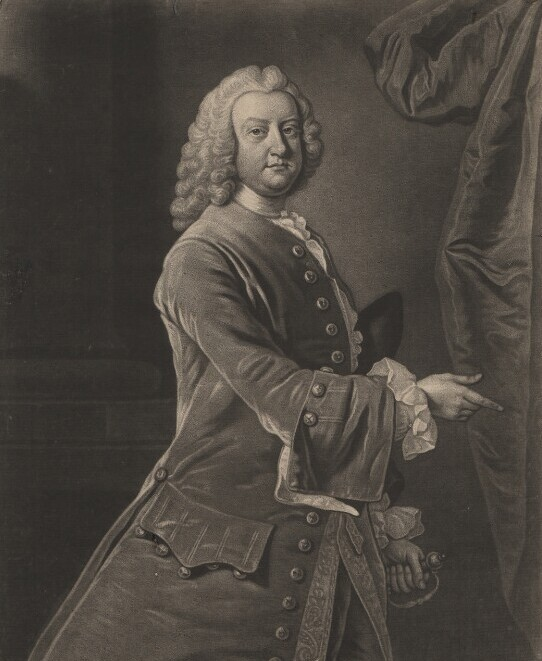
1748 mezzotint of Philipps by John Faber the Younger after a Thomas Hudson portrait

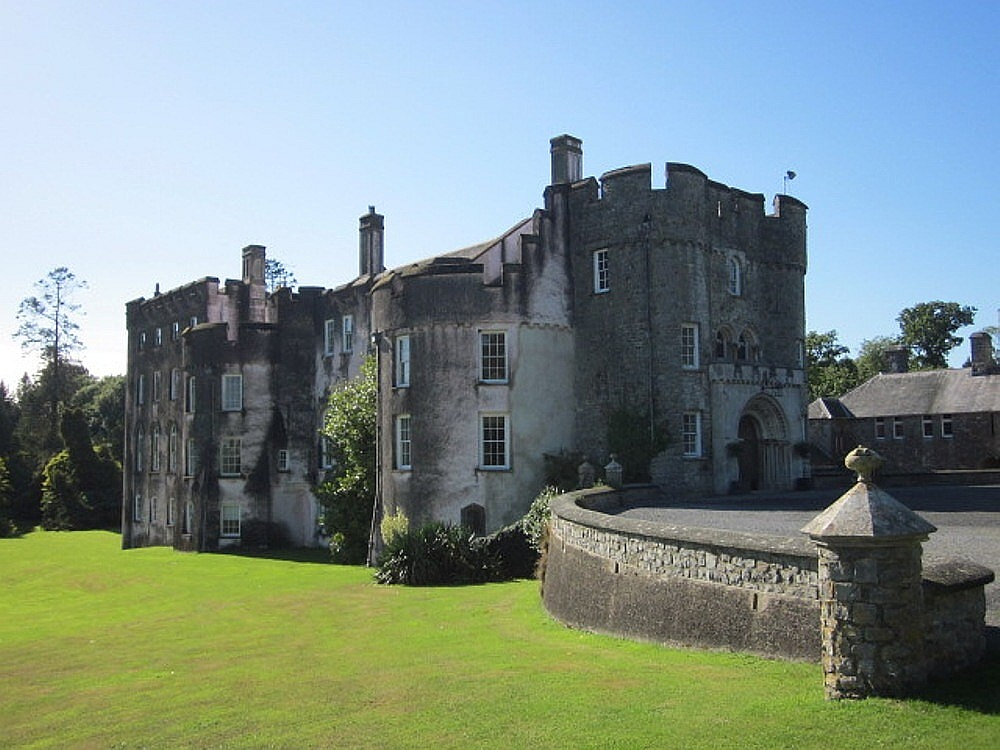
Picton Castle

Sir John Philipps, 6th Baronet, PC (c. 1701 – 22 June 1764) was a British politician and lawyer who served as Lord Lieutenant of Haverfordwest from 1761 to 1764. Sir John was the son of Sir John Philipps, 4th Baronet. He studied at Pembroke College, Oxford, and went on to Lincoln's Inn.

In 1736 he was elected mayor of Haverfordwest and in 1741 he became MP for Carmarthen. In 1743, his elder brother, Sir Erasmus Philipps, 5th Baronet, was accidentally drowned, and Sir John inherited the baronetcy and Picton Castle. He gave up the Carmarthenshire seat in 1747, but re-entered Parliament as MP for Petersfield (1754–1761), and Pembrokeshire (1761–1764). In 1763 he became a privy counsellor.

A patron of education, he founded several scholarships at his former Oxford college. Proposed by his elder brother, he was elected a Fellow of the Royal Society in 1742. In 1725, he married Elizabeth, the daughter of Henry Shepherd of London, with whom he had a son and 3 daughters. Among the family's servants was Cesar Picton, a former slave from Senegal, who later became a successful coal merchant in Kingston upon Thames, Surrey. The family lived for many years at Norbiton Place, an estate just outside Kingston, and Sir John died here on 22 June 1764. He was succeeded by the son, Richard, who was created Baron Milford in 1776.

Parliament of Great Britain
Preceded by Arthur Bevan	Member of Parliament for Carmarthen; 1741–1747	Succeeded by Thomas Mathews
Preceded by William Gerard Hamilton; William Beckford	Member of Parliament for Petersfield; 1754–1761; With: William Gerard Hamilton	Succeeded by John Jolliffe; Richard Pennant
Preceded by Sir William Owen, Bt	Member of Parliament for Pembrokeshire; 1761–1764	Succeeded by Sir Richard Philipps, Bt
Honorary titles
New title Split from the Lord Lieutenant of Pembrokeshire	Lord Lieutenant of Haverfordwest; 1761–1764	Vacant Title next held by Sir Richard Philipps, Bt
Baronetage of England
Preceded by Erasmus Philipps	Baronet (of Picton Castle); 1743–1764	Succeeded by Richard Philipps
