= Cesar Picton =

British merchant (c.1755–1836)

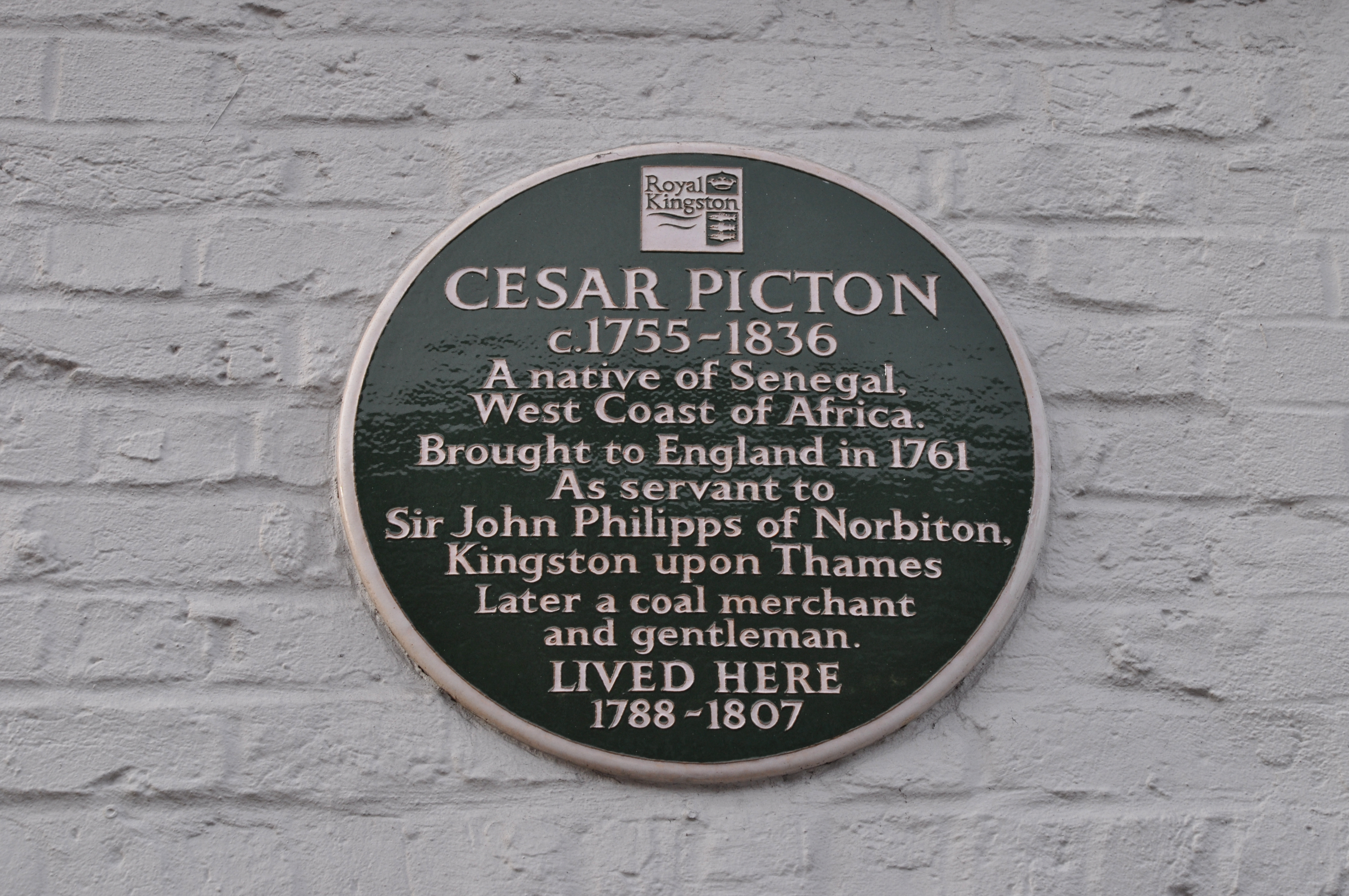
Plaque on Picton House, Kingston, summarising Picton's life

Cesar Picton (c. 1755 – 1836) was a British merchant of West African descent. Born in West Africa, he was presumably enslaved by the time he was about six years old. He was subsequently brought to England by a British Army officer in 1761 and given as a servant to British politician and lawyer Sir John Philipps, 6th Baronet, mostly living in Norbiton near Kingston upon Thames in Surrey. Picton eventually left the Philipps' family service and became a wealthy coal merchant in Kingston.

== Early life ==
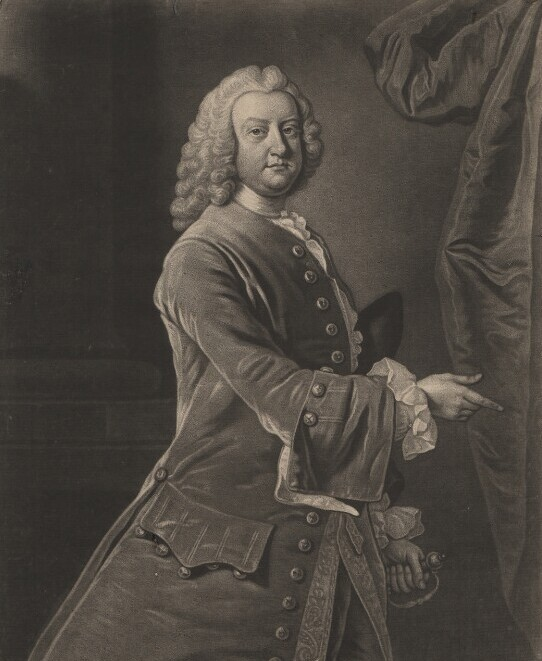
1748 mezzotint of Sir John Philipps by John Faber the Younger after a Thomas Hudson portrait

The person who would become known as Cesar Picton was born c. 1755 in Senegambia, mostly likely into an Islamic family. In 1758, the British capture of Senegal during the Seven Years' War led to Senegambia, which was a major region of the Atlantic slave trade, to be occupied by Great Britain. A British Army officer, serving as part of the occupational force, purchased a young boy who had been sold into slavery by the age of six and brought him back to England. The officer gave him to British politician and lawyer Sir John Philipps, 6th Baronet in November 1761 along with the gifts of a parakeet and non-British duck. Philipps, along with his wife Elizabeth, arranged for the boy to be baptised and christened "Cesar". He would not adopt the surname 'Picton' until later in life.

After his baptism, the Philipps family arranged for Picton to enter their household as a page boy, clad in a velvet turban (which cost ten shillings and a sixpence) in a rococo style. He quickly became a favourite of the family, especially Elizabeth. When Picton was about 33, Horace Walpole wrote in a letter of 1788: "I was in Kingston with the sisters of Lord Milford [Sir John's son]; they have a favourite black, who has been with them a great many years and is remarkably sensible", "sensible" at this period meaning "possessing sensibility". He had clearly achieved an unusual status in the household. Picton took his surname from Picton Castle, Pembrokeshire, the Philipps's country estate in Wales, which was then a significant site for mining coal. It is possible that he chose this particular surname as a result of his short residence at Picton Castle from summer 1762.

The legal status of slaves brought to the British Isles was ambiguous when Picton arrived, but they were certainly not regarded or treated in the same way as enslaved people in British America. The situation was clarified considerably by Somerset v Stewart of 1772 (when Picton was in his late teens), which ruled that no person could be a slave in England itself. By the time of the case, most black servants seem already to have been regarded and treated as free, at least by the time they reached adulthood.

== Tradesman to gentleman ==
Following the deaths of Sir John in 1764, and his wife in 1788, and the sale of Norbiton Place by their son, Picton used a legacy of £100 from Lady Phillipps to set up in business as a coal merchant in nearby Kingston. The move from servant to tradesman was a common one; Picton was presumably well-known to the owners and upper servants of the many large houses in the area after nearly thirty years at Norbiton. The three unmarried Phillipps daughters had moved to nearby Hampton Court on the sale of the house, and since they all later left him legacies (in total by 1820, £250 and £30 a year), they may well have encouraged their friends to buy coal from him. In the phrase of the day, he had "connections". In addition, it is probably no coincidence that the Phillipps' estate at Picton was a centre of coal mining; he may well have sourced his supplies from them, to mutual advantage, and perhaps had already been involved in managing their affairs.

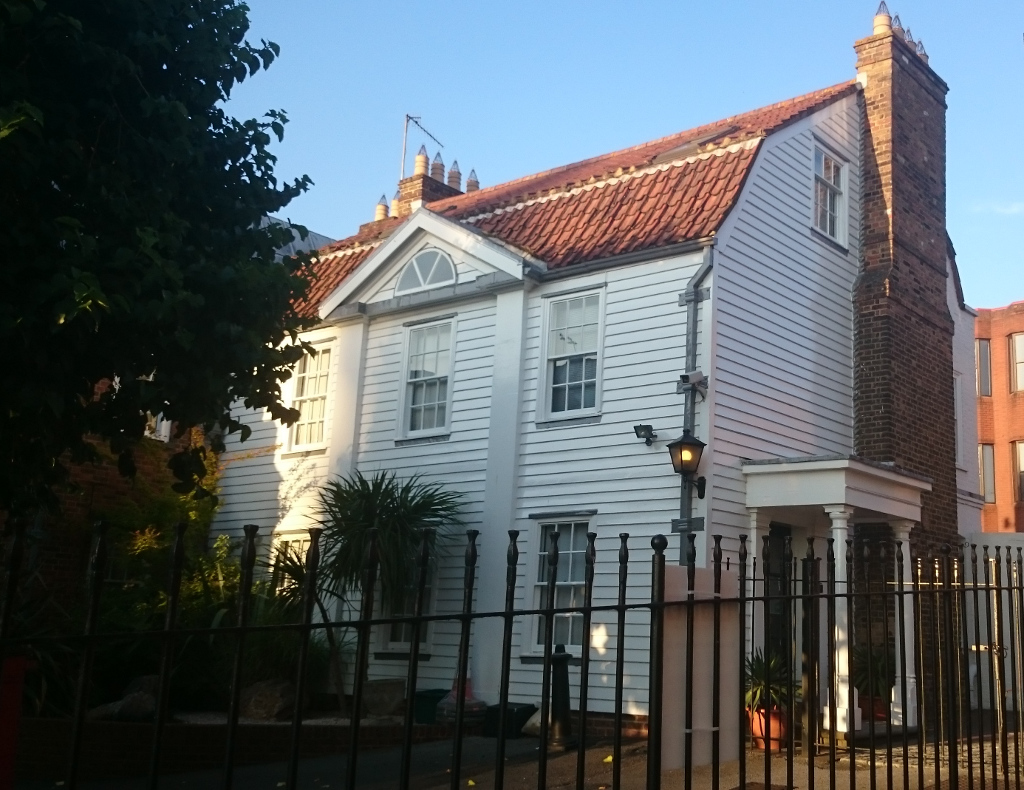
Picton House, Kingston

His original premises at 52 High Street, Kingston Upon Thames backs onto the River Thames. Picton lived here for the first years of his business, initially renting, but in 1795 buying it and other property including a wharf onto the Thames for unloading the coal, and a malthouse.

In 1801 Picton was convicted for poaching with an unlicensed gun and fined five pounds. The fine was relatively trivial for Picton and someone of lower social status may have faced execution or transportation to Australia for the same offence. Picton appealed the decision using the services of a London attorney, who challenged the conviction on the grounds that the magistrate's record of the year of the offence was incorrectly recorded. The King's Bench held that this was "surplusage" and not material to the validity of the case, so the conviction was upheld. Picton's race was not mentioned in either the judgement or the report of the appeal that appeared in The Morning Post.

In 1807 Picton let his Kingston properties and moved to a rented house in Tolworth, perhaps marking his retirement aged 52 from active trade. He was by then described in deeds as a "gentleman" and by 1816 he bought a house with a large garden in Thames Ditton for an above-average £4,000. He died in 1836 at the age of 81 and is buried in All Saints Church, Kingston upon Thames. He was evidently a very large man as a four-wheeled trolley was needed for the coffin.

== Legacy ==
Picton was successful in business and became rich. While this was in contrast to the majority of black people in Britain at the time, some did achieve status and prosperity, for example the writer and abolitionist Olaudah Equiano and the Mayfair shopkeeper Ignatius Sancho. Other successful black businessmen worked as publicans and lodging-house keepers, providing some evidence of black upward social mobility.

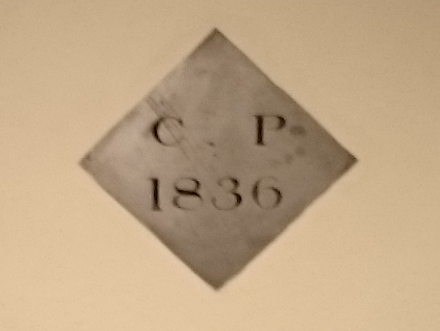
Cesar Picton memorial

Picton left a portrait of himself in his will (along with several other paintings), but its whereabouts is not known. It emerged in 2007 that the portrait of Picton depicted in a mural of Kingston's history, commissioned by the Council, was actually of either Olaudah Equiano or Ignatius Sancho. He is not known to have married, and all his bequests were to friends, including 16 mourning rings. Although Picton lived through the main period of the British abolitionist movement, no involvement by him is known.

Both his former homes, in Kingston High Street and in Thames Ditton, have listed status; the Kingston High Street one is Grade II* and the Thames Ditton one is II. Both display commemorative plaques, and are known as Picton House, although the Kingston building was called Amari House between 1981 and 1985 when it was headquarters of Amari Plastics Ltd. A meeting and reception room, the Picton Room, at Kingston University is named in his honour.

Picton is a character in the children's novel Jupiter Williams by S.I. Martin, set in 1800.

During Picton's time in Kingston, the area also gave rise to a significant legal case related to slavery in R[ex] v Inhabitants of Thames Ditton of 1785, where Lord Mansfield (previously the judge in Somersett's Case) held that Charlotte Howe, a former slave, was not entitled to pay for her previous work, in the absence of a specific contract.

== See also ==
- Black British elite, Picton's class in Britain
- List of slaves
- Black British people, 17th and 18th centuries
