= Taylor baronets of Hollycombe (1828) =

Escutcheon of the Taylor baronets of Hollycombe

The Taylor baronetcy, of Hollycombe in the County of Sussex, was created in the Baronetage of the United Kingdom on 21 January 1828 for Charles Taylor, for many years Member of Parliament for Wells. His father was Peter Taylor MP. The title became extinct on the death of the 2nd Baronet in 1876.

== Taylor baronets, of Hollycombe (1828) ==
- Sir Charles William Taylor, 1st Baronet (1770–1857)
- Sir Charles Taylor, 2nd Baronet (1817–1876)

Baronetage of the United Kingdom
Preceded by Vivian baronets	Taylor baronets of Hollycombe; 21 January 1828	Succeeded by Price baronets
