= Owen Philipps, 1st Baron Kylsant =

British politician

The Right Honorable The Lord Kylsant
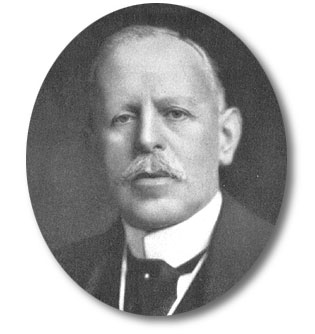
- Lord Kylsant, picture taken in the 1920s
- Born: Owen Cosby Philipps; 25 March 1863; Warminster, Wiltshire, England
- Died: 5 June 1937 (aged 74); Llangynog, Carmarthenshire, Wales
- Known for: Business man, politician
- Title: Baron Kylsant, of Carmarthen in the County of Carmarthen and of Amroth in the County of Pembroke
- Political party: Liberal Member of Parliament (1906–1910); Conservative Member of Parliament (1916–1922)
- Board member of: Chairman and Chief Executive of Royal Mail Steam Packet Company
- Criminal charge: Publishing a document with intent to induce a person to advance property (section 84 Larceny Act 1861)
- Criminal penalty: Twelve months' imprisonment
- Spouse: Mai Alice Magdalene Morris (1902–1937)
- Children: Three daughters
- Awards: KCMG (1909); KStJ (1926); GCMG (1918) (revoked)

Owen Cosby Philipps, 1st Baron Kylsant (25 March 1863 – 5 June 1937), known as Sir Owen Philipps between 1909 and 1923, was a British businessman and politician, jailed in 1931 for producing a document with intent to deceive.

== Background ==
Philipps was the third of five sons of the Reverend Sir James Erasmus Philipps, 12th Baronet, of Picton Castle, and his wife the Hon. Mary, daughter of the Hon. and Rev. Samuel Best and sister of the fifth Baron Wynford. Born in Warminster vicarage, Wiltshire, and educated at Newton College, Newton Abbot, Devon, he became an apprentice with a Newcastle upon Tyne shipping firm, Dent & Co, in 1880 and upon completion of his apprenticeship he moved to the Glasgow shipping firm Allan & Gow in 1886.

== Shipping career ==
With financial assistance from his eldest brother John Philipps (who was later created the 1st Viscount St Davids), Philipps set up his own shipping firm Philipps & Co in 1888, bought his first ship in 1889 and by the end of the nineteenth century the two brothers owned two shipping lines (King Line Ltd and the Scottish Steamship Company), a finance company (the London Maritime Investment Company), and the London and Thames Haven Petroleum Wharf. Taking advantage of a low share price, the brothers acquired shares in the Royal Mail Steam Packet Company, and by 1902 Owen had become chairman and managing director of the line. Over the next twenty years he and the Royal Mail Steam Packet Company acquired a controlling interest in more than twenty other companies, including the Union-Castle Line and the Pacific Steam Navigation Company. Acquisitions continued, culminating in the purchase of the White Star in 1927.

Lord Kylsant gained a reputation for acting unilaterally and autocratically, without consulting other board members. At the same time, the complex share structure of the companies within the Royal Mail Steam Packet Company group allowed him to continue his control of the group while hiding trading losses in individual firms by moving reserves around. In 1924 Kylsant also became chairman of Harland and Wolff, the Belfast shipbuilders.

== Political career ==
Since his time in Scotland, Philipps had been interested in politics and after two unsuccessful attempts to stand for Parliament he was elected as Member of Parliament for Pembroke and Haverfordwest as a Liberal in 1906. Reelected at the General Election in January 1910 he declined to stand again at the second general election in December 1910. It was immediately reported that he would seek the nomination for the West Carmarthenshire constituency, especially in view of his plans to live in the constituency, at Coomb Mansion, the birthplace of Lady Philipps. It was envisaged that the contest for the nomination would be between Philipps and John Hinds. However, he eventually trailed a distant third at the selection conference held at Water Street Chapel, Carmarthen, and the nomination went to Hinds.

He later left the Liberal Party and joined the Conservative Party, being elected unopposed as the Member for City of Chester at a by-election in 1916. Re-elected at the 1918 General Election he served until 1922, but did not stand again.

== Other offices and honours ==
In 1904, Philipps was High Sheriff of Pembrokeshire and became a deputy lieutenant for Pembrokeshire in 1917, and Lord Lieutenant of Haverfordwest in 1924. In 1909, Philipps was invested as a Knight Commander of the Order of St Michael and St George (KCMG), later raised to Knight Grand Cross (GCMG) in 1918.

In 1912, he was invested as a Knight of Grace of the Order of Saint John of Jerusalem and raised to a Knight of Justice in 1916.

On 14 February 1923, he was elevated to the peerage as Baron Kylsant, of Carmarthen in the County of Carmarthen and of Amroth in the County of Pembroke.

Following his conviction he resigned all his knighthoods and lieutenancies; when he attempted to resign from his clubs, however, the offer was firmly refused.

== Downfall and trial ==
In 1928, Lord Kylsant applied to extend the government guarantee on a loan from the Midland Bank. When the application was refused, his shipping group defaulted on part of the next repayment. Much of the group's finances were based on debenture stock paying fixed interest at five per cent, and the main trustee of this stock was Kylsant's older brother, the 1st Viscount St Davids, who was unhappy with the way debenture stock was being issued, especially a £2,000,000 issue in 1928. Lord St Davids made his concerns public, and the stock market values of the whole group declined sharply. Worried by these revelations and fearing an economic crisis, the British government appointed the accountant William McLintock to investigate the group's finances. His report issued in early 1930 revealed that Royal Mail Steam Packet Company had liabilities in excess of £10,000,000. This was enough for the banks to act, and much of Kylsant's powers were removed to trustees appointed by the banks, although Kylsant remained chairman until November 1930. In February 1931, Kylsant and his wife went to the Union of South Africa on holiday, and in his absence, McLintock revealed that for several years the Royal Mail Steam Packet group had been paying dividends to stockholders despite trading at a loss. McLintock did not report this activity as fraudulent, although politicians used the term when the matter was discussed in the House of Commons.

On his return from South Africa, Kylsant was arrested and charged with making false statements with regard to company accounts for 1926 and 1927, contrary to section 84 of the Larceny Act 1861. The company auditor, Harold John Morland, was charged with aiding and abetting the same offences. Kylsant was also charged with issuing a document (the prospectus issued for the 1928 debenture stock issue) with intent to deceive, contrary to section 84 of the Larceny Act 1861. Both men were committed for trial at the Old Bailey.

The trial took place in July 1931 and lasted for nine days, presided over by Mr Justice Wright. Both men pleaded not guilty to all charges. At the end of the trial, while both men were found not guilty of the first two charges, Kylsant was found guilty of the final charge of issuing a document with intent to deceive. Morland was discharged and Kylsant was sentenced to twelve months' imprisonment. After one night in prison he was released on bail, pending an appeal against the conviction. Kylsant's appeal against the conviction and sentence was heard in November 1931, when it was dismissed, and he subsequently served ten months in Wormwood Scrubs prison before being released in August 1932.

In his obituary, The Times reported:

Lord Kylsant bore his trial with great dignity, cast no blame on any colleagues, and on return to ordinary life retired to his residence in South Wales. On his return to Coomb he was given a warm welcome and his car was drawn by 40 men at a running pace for about a quarter of a mile to the entrance of the house, and passed under an arch of laurel and evergreen which had been built over the gates. All who knew him acquitted him of any desire to act criminally, and they laid the responsibility on the assumption of duties beyond the power of any individual to bear and on a certain financial recklessness and a belief in the future which events showed was unjustified.

Owen Philipps, circa 1905.

== Personal life ==
Owen Philipps married at Carmarthen on 16 September 1902 Mai Alice Magdalene Morris, daughter of Thomas Morris, of Coomb, Carmarthenshire. They had three daughters. When Lord Kylsant died at the age of 74, the barony became extinct as he had no sons. His daughter Nesta Philipps, who had married George Coventry, later the 10th Earl of Coventry, inherited her father's house, Amroth Castle in Pembrokeshire.

Parliament of the United Kingdom
Preceded by John Laurie	Member of Parliament for Pembroke and Haverfordwest; 1906 – December 1910	Succeeded by Hon. Henry Guest
Preceded by Robert Yerburgh	Member of Parliament for Chester; 1916–1922	Succeeded by Sir Charles Cayzer, Bt
Honorary titles
Preceded by Sir Charles Philipps, Bt	Lord Lieutenant of Haverfordwest; 1924–1931	returned to Pembrokeshire
Peerage of the United Kingdom
New creation	Baron Kylsant; 1923–1937	Extinct
