= Arthur Bevan =

British politician and lawyer (died 1742)

Member of Parliament for Carmarthen
- In office 1727–1741
- Preceded by: James Phillips
- Succeeded by: Sir John Philipps

Recorder of Carmarthen
- In office 22 July 1722 – 7 August 1741

Personal details
- Born: c. 1687 Laugharne, Carmarthenshire, Wales
- Died: 6 March 1742
- Party: Whig
- Spouse: Bridget Vaughan
- Education: Brasenose College, Oxford; Middle Temple
- Profession: Lawyer

Arthur Bevan (c. 1687 – 6 March 1742), of Laugharne, Carmarthenshire, was a Welsh lawyer and Whig politician who sat in the House of Commons from 1727 to 1741.

Bevan was the eldest surviving son of Zachary Bevan and his wife Sarah Bayly of Laugharne. He matriculated at Brasenose College, Oxford on 28 February 1705, aged 17. Also in 1705, he was admitted at Middle Temple and was called to the bar in 1712. He married Bridget Vaughan, daughter of John Vaughan of Derllys, Carmarthen. from a junior branch of the Vaughans of Golden Grove who led the Whig interest in Carmarthen in the seventeenth century.

On 22 July 1722, Bevan was appointed Recorder of Carmarthen, where he played a leading role in the Whig interest. He was elected in a contest at the 1727 British general election as Member of Parliament for Carmarthen. He voted against the Excise Bill in 1733, but all his other recorded votes were for the Government. He was returned unopposed at the 1734 British general election and was chairman of the committee set up to consider the continuance of expired or expiring laws for each session in 1734, 1737 and 1739. He lost his seat at the 1741 British general election and also lost his recordership on 7 August 1741 as a result of Sir John Philipps' development of the Tory interest in the borough.

Bevan died on 6 March 1742.

Parliament of Great Britain
Preceded by James Phillips	Member of Parliament for Carmarthen; 1727–1741	Succeeded by Sir John Philipps
