= Viscount St Davids =

Viscountcy in the Peerage of the United Kingdom

Picton Castle, the former seat of the Philipps family

Viscount St Davids, of Lydstep Haven in the County of Pembroke, is a title in the Peerage of the United Kingdom. It was created in 1918 for John Philipps, 1st Baron St Davids.

== History ==
The first bearer of the surname was Sir Thomas Philipps (died 1520), of Clisant, Llanwinio, Carmarthenshire, Wales. He was the son of Philip ap Maredudd. He was a patrilineal descendant of Sir Aron ap Rhys, a Welsh knight who accompanied Richard I on the Crusades in 1190.

The titular family descends from Sir John Philipps (died 27 March 1629), who represented Pembrokeshire in the House of Commons. In 1621 he was created a Baronet, of Picton Castle in the County of Pembroke, in the Baronetage of England. His grandson, the third Baronet, also sat as Member of Parliament for Pembrokeshire. He was succeeded by his son, the fourth Baronet. He represented Pembroke and Haverfordwest in Parliament. His son, the fifth Baronet, sat for Haverfordwest. He was succeeded by his younger brother, the sixth Baronet. He represented Carmarthen, Petersfield and Pembrokeshire in the House of Commons.

His son, the seventh Baronet, was Member of Parliament for Pembrokeshire and Haverfordwest and also served as Lord-Lieutenant of Haverfordwest and of Pembrokeshire. In 1776 he was raised to the Peerage of Ireland as Baron Milford. However, this title became extinct on his death in 1823. He was succeeded in the baronetcy by his distant relative, the eighth Baronet. He was a descendant of Hugh Philipps, third son of the first Baronet. He was succeeded by his younger brother, the ninth Baronet. This line of the family failed on the death of the latter's son, the tenth Baronet, in 1857.

The late Baronet was succeeded by his kinsman, the eleventh Baronet. His son, the twelfth Baronet, was a clergyman and served as Vicar of Warminster from 1859 to 1897 and as Canon of Salisbury. He was succeeded by his eldest son, the thirteenth Baronet. He sat as Liberal Member of Parliament for Mid Lanarkshire and Pembrokeshire. In 1908, four years before he succeeded his father in the baronetcy, he was created Baron St Davids, of Roch Castle in the County of Pembroke, in the Peerage of the United Kingdom. In 1918 he was further honoured when he was made Viscount St Davids, of Lydstep Haven in the County of Pembroke, also in the Peerage of the United Kingdom. Lord St Davids married as his second wife Elizabeth Frances Philipps, 14th Baroness Strange, 15th Baroness Hungerford and 14th Baroness de Moleyns (1884–1974) (see the Baron Strange, Baron Hungerford and Baron de Moleyns for earlier history of these titles). The Viscount's two sons from his first marriage were both killed in action in the First World War.

He was succeeded therefore by his son from his second marriage, Iestyn, who became the second Viscount. In 1974, he also succeeded his mother as Baron Strange, Baron Hungerford and Baron De Moleyns. His son, Colwyn Philipps, 3rd Viscount St Davids, who succeeded in 1991, held office from 1992 to 1994 in the Conservative administration of John Major and was a Deputy Speaker of the House of Lords from 1995 to 1999. However, Lord St Davids lost his seat in the House of Lords after the passing of the House of Lords Act 1999. As of 2017 the titles are held by his eldest son Rhodri Philipps, the fourth Viscount, who succeeded in 2009.

Two of the first Viscount's younger brothers, Owen Philipps, 1st Baron Kylsant, and Laurence Philipps, 1st Baron Milford, were also raised to the peerage.

== Titleholders ==
=== Philipps Baronets, of Picton Castle (1621) ===
- Sir John Philipps, 1st Baronet (died 1629)
- Sir Richard Philipps, 2nd Baronet (died c. 1648)
- Sir Erasmus Philipps, 3rd Baronet (c. 1623–1697)
- Sir John Philipps, 4th Baronet (c. 1666–1737)
- Sir Erasmus Philipps, 5th Baronet (1699–1743)
- Sir John Philipps, 6th Baronet (c. 1701–1764)
- Sir Richard Philipps, 7th Baronet (1744–1823) (created Baron Milford in 1776)

=== Barons Milford (1776) ===
- Richard Philipps, 1st Baron Milford (1744–1823)

=== Philipps Baronets, of Picton Castle (1621; Reverted) ===
- Sir Rowland Perry Philipps-Laugharne-Philipps, 8th Baronet (1788–1832)
- Sir William Philipps-Laugharne-Philipps, 9th Baronet (1794–1850)
- Sir Godwin Philipps-Laugharne-Philipps, 10th Baronet (1840–1857)
- Sir James Evans Philipps, 11th Baronet (1793–1873)
- Sir James Erasmus Philipps, 12th Baronet (1824–1912)
- Sir John Wynford Philipps, 13th Baronet (1860–1938) (created Baron St Davids in 1908 and Viscount St Davids in 1918)

=== Viscounts St Davids (1918) ===
- John Wynford Philipps, 1st Viscount St Davids (1860–1938)
- Jestyn Reginald Austen Plantagenet Philipps, 2nd Viscount St Davids (1917–1991)
- Colwyn Jestyn John Philipps, 3rd Viscount St Davids (1939–2009)
- Rhodri Colwyn Philipps, 4th Viscount St Davids (born 1966)

The heir presumptive is the present holder's brother Hon. Roland Augusto Jestyn Estanislao Philipps (born 1970). There are no further heirs to the Viscount St Davids or Baron St Davids titles, but there are to the other titles:

The co-heirs presumptive to the Baronies of Strange, Hungerford and De Moleyns are Amber Philipps (born 1998) and Charlotte Philipps (born 2000), daughters of the Hon Roland Philipps above.

The heir presumptive to the Philipps Baronets of Picton Castle is Guy Philipps, 4th Baron Milford (born 1961).

== Arms ==
Coat of arms of Viscount St Davids
Coronet A Coronet of a Viscount Crest A Lion as in the Arms Escutcheon Argent a Lion rampant Sable ducally gorged and chained Or langued and armed Gules Supporters Dexter: a Knight vested in chain armour the Jupon charged with the arms of Philipps and resting his exterior hand upon the Hilt of his Sword; Sinister: a Knight vested in plate armour his Jupon charged with the arms of Wogan (Or on a Chief Sable three Martlets of the field) and resting his exterior hand upon the Hilt of his Sword; both standing upon a Battlemented Wall all proper Motto Ducit Amor Patriae ("Patriotism Is My Motive")

== See also ==
- Baron Kylsant
- Baron Milford
- Philipps Baronets
- Baron Strange
- Baron Hungerford
- Baron de Moleyns
- Picton Castle
