= Richard Philipps, 1st Baron Milford (first creation) =

Welsh politician

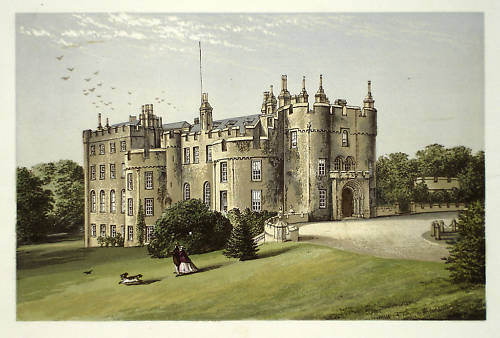
Engraving of Picton Castle, the seat of Lord Milford.

Richard Philipps, 1st Baron Milford (1744 – 28 November 1823), known as Sir Richard Philipps, Bt, from 1764 to 1776, was a Welsh landowner and Tory politician who sat in the House of Commons between 1765 and 1812.

== Background and education ==
Philipps was the son of Sir John Philipps, 6th Baronet, of Picton Castle, and was educated at Pembroke College, Oxford. He succeeded in the baronetcy in 1764.

== Political career ==
Philipps was returned to parliament for Pembrokeshire in 1765 (succeeding his deceased father), and held the seat at the 1768 general election. However, in 1770 his election was declared void. In 1774 he was returned for Plympton Erle in Devon, a seat he held until 1779. In 1776 he was raised to the Peerage of Ireland as Baron Milford. As this was an Irish peerage he was able to remain in the House of Commons. He was out of parliament until 1784, when he was returned for Haverfordwest. In 1786 he was once again elected for Pembrokeshire, and continued to represent the constituency until 1812.

At the 1806 General Election, Philipps was opposed by the Owen family of Orielton but successfully held the seat. However, in 1812, he stood down in favour of John Frederick Campbell, heir to Lord Cawdor. At the ensuing election, however, Campbell was opposed and defeated by Sir John Owen of Orielton, who had recently inherited that estate from a distant cousin.

He was also Lord-Lieutenant of Haverfordwest from 1770 to 1823 and Lord Lieutenant of Pembrokeshire from 1786 to 1823.

== Personal life ==
Lord Milford married Elizabeth, daughter of James Philipps, of Pentypark, in 1764. His only son with his first wife, Mary Grant, John Philipps, was taken for dead after the Battle of Trafalgar. He died in November 1823. The barony died with him while he was succeeded in the baronetcy by a distant relative (see Viscount St Davids). He bequeathed his estates, including the family seat of Picton Castle, to his cousin Richard Grant, who assumed the surname of Philipps. Richard Grant was the son of John Grant and Mary Philippa Artemisia, daughter of James Child and Mary Philippa Artemisia, daughter of Bulkeley Philipps, uncle of Lord Milford. He was created a Baronet in 1828 and made Baron Milford in 1847.

== Sources ==
- Williams, David (1960). "The Pembrokeshire Elections of 1831" (PDF). Welsh History Review. 1 (1): 37–64.

Parliament of Great Britain
| Preceded by Sir John Philipps, Bt | Member of Parliament for Pembrokeshire; 1765–1770 | Succeeded by Hugh Owen |
| Preceded by Paul Henry Ourry; William Baker | Member of Parliament for Plympton Erle; 1774–1779; With: Paul Henry Ourry 1774–1775; John Durand 1775–1779 | Succeeded by John Durand; William Fullarton |
| Preceded by The Lord Kensington | Member of Parliament for Haverfordwest; 1784–1786 | Succeeded by The Lord Kensington |
| Preceded by Sir Hugh Owen, Bt | Member of Parliament for Pembrokeshire; 1786–1800 | Succeeded by Parliament of the United Kingdom |
Parliament of the United Kingdom
| Preceded by Parliament of Great Britain | Member of Parliament for Pembrokeshire; 1801–1812 | Succeeded by John Owen |
Honorary titles
| Vacant Title last held by Sir John Philipps, Bt | Lord-Lieutenant of Haverfordwest; 1770–1823 | Succeeded by The Lord Milford |
| Preceded by Sir Hugh Owen, Bt | Lord Lieutenant of Pembrokeshire; 1786–1823 | Succeeded by Sir John Owen, Bt |
Peerage of Ireland
| New creation | Baron Milford; 1776–1823 | Extinct |
Baronetage of England
| Preceded by John Philipps | Baronet (of Picton Castle); 1764–1823 | Succeeded by Rowland Philipps-Laugharne-Philipps |
