= Price baronets of Foxley (1828) =

Escutcheon of the Price baronets of Foxley

The Price baronetcy, of Foxley in the County of Hereford, was created in the Baronetage of the United Kingdom on 12 February 1828 for Uvedale Price, best known for his writings on the Picturesque. His only son, the 2nd Baronet, sat as Member of Parliament for Herefordshire. The title became extinct on his death without issue in 1857.

== Price baronets of Foxley (1828) ==
- Sir Uvedale Price, 1st Baronet (1747–1829)
- Sir Robert Price, 2nd Baronet (1786–1857)

== Notes ==
Baronetage of the United Kingdom
Preceded by Taylor baronets	Price baronets of Foxley; 12 February 1828	Succeeded by Philipps baronets
