= Lord Lieutenant of Haverfordwest =

Welsh county corporate ceremonial officer

This is a list of people who served as Lord Lieutenant of Haverfordwest. The county corporate of Haverfordwest was usually under the jurisdiction of the Lord Lieutenant of Pembrokeshire, but it had its own Lord Lieutenant and Custos Rotulorum from 1761 until 1931.

== Lord Lieutenants of Haverfordwest to 1931 ==
- Sir John Philipps, 6th Baronet 14 May 1761 – 23 June 1764
- vacant
- Richard Philipps, 1st Baron Milford (first creation) (Baron Milford from 1776) 28 April 1770 – 28 November 1823
- Richard Philipps, 1st Baron Milford (second creation) (Sir Richard Philipps, from 1828 and Baron Milford from 1847) 19 February 1824 – 3 January 1857
- Sir John Philipps-Scourfield 1 July 1857 – 3 June 1876
- Sir Charles Philipps, 1st Baronet 7 August 1876 – 27 October 1924
- Owen Philipps, 1st Baron Kylsant 27 October 1924 – 7 November 1931
