= History of the British peerage =

Chronology of UK nobility

The history of the British peerage, a system of nobility found in the United Kingdom, stretches over the last thousand years. The current form of the British peerage has been a process of development. While the ranks of baron and earl predate the British peerage itself, the ranks of duke and marquess were introduced to England in the 14th century. The rank of viscount came later, in the mid-15th century. Peers were summoned to Parliament, forming the House of Lords.

The unions of England and Scotland to form Great Britain in 1707, and of Great Britain and Ireland to form the United Kingdom in 1801, led successively to the establishment of the Peerages of Great Britain and later of the United Kingdom, and the discontinuation of creations in the Peerages of England and Scotland. Scottish and Irish peers did not have an automatic right to sit in the House of Lords, and instead elected representative peers from amongst their number.

Peerages were largely hereditary until the regular creation of life peers began in the second half of the 20th century. The last creation of a non-royal hereditary peer occurred in 1984; even then it was considered unusual. Only Life peers still retain the right to sit and vote in the House of Lords, though their power is restricted and further reform of the House of Lords is under consideration.

== English peerage ==
=== Anglo-Saxon period (5th century – 1066) ===
==== 5th–8th century ====
In the 5th century, Germanic peoples collectively known as Anglo-Saxons migrated to sub-Roman Britain and came to dominate the east and southeast of the island. Based on archaeological evidence (such as burials and buildings), these early communities appear to have lacked any social elite. Around half the population were free, independent farmers (Old English: ceorlas) who cultivated a hide of land (enough to provide for a family). Slaves, mostly native Britons, made up the other half.

By the late 6th century, the archeological evidence (grander burials and buildings) suggests the development of a social elite. The early law codes of Kent use the Old English word eorl ('high born', 'noble') to describe a nobleman. By the 8th century, the word gesith ('companion'; Latin: comes) had replaced eorl as the common term for a nobleman.

==== 900–1066 ====
By the 10th century, Anglo-Saxon society was divided into three main social classes: slaves, ceorlas ('free men'), and þegnas ('thegns', 'aristocrats'). Thegn (Old English: þeġn) meant servant or warrior, and it replaced the term gesith in the 10th century. Law codes assigned a weregeld or man price of 200 shillings for a ceorl and 1,200s for a thegn. Children inherited thegnly status from their father, and a thegnly woman who married a ceorl retained her noble status.

Not all ceorlas were peasants. Some were themselves landlords, and these prosperous free men could aspire to thegnly rank. Archbishop Wulfstan of York (1002–1023) wrote that a ceorl had to own five hides to qualify for thegnhood. The legal text Norðleoda laga ('law of the Northern People') concurred but added that the property qualification had to be met for three generations.

In 1066, there were an estimated 5,000 thegns in England. These were divided into three ranks: ealdormen, king's thegns, and median thegns. The ealdorman was an official appointed by the king to administer a shire or group of shires (an ealdormanry). In the 11th century, while England was ruled by a Danish dynasty, the office changed from ealdorman to earl (related to Old English eorl and Scandinavian jarl). After the king, the earl was the most powerful secular magnate. During Edward the Confessor's reign (1042–1066), there were four principal earldoms: Wessex, Mercia, Northumbria, and East Anglia.

Below ealdormen were king's thegns, so called because they only served the king. The lowest thegnly rank were the median thegns who owed service to other thegns. Thegns were the backbone of local government and the military. Sheriffs were drawn from this class, and thegns were required to attend the shire court and give judgment. For these reasons, historian David Carpenter described thegns as "the country gentry of Anglo-Saxon England".

High-ranking members of the church hierarchy (archbishops, bishops and abbots) paralleled the secular aristocracy. The church's power derived from its spiritual authority as well as its virtual monopoly on education. Secular government depended on educated clergy to function, and prelates were important politicians and royal advisers in the witan (the king's council).

=== Post-Conquest baronage (1066–1299) ===
After the Norman Conquest of 1066, William the Conqueror (r. 1066–1087) confiscated the property of the old Anglo-Saxon nobility and granted it to the king's Norman followers according to the rules of feudalism—vassals were granted fiefs in return for military service and counsel. These tenants-in-chief would then grant land to their own vassals. The greater tenants-in-chief were large landowners known as feudal barons who held tenure by barony (per baroniam in Latin) and were distinguished by certain rights and responsibilities from other tenants-in-chief who held tenure by knight-service.

There were around 170 barons. The baronage was largely untitled, but a small number of barons (never more than 25 at one time) enjoyed the title of earl, the only hereditary title in England before 1337. The historian David Crouch defined baron as "the greatest men in the aristocracy (whether they were earls, barons or not), men habitually at court, lords of great estates, those indeed whom the king consulted in the affairs of the realm".

The fiefs of earls and barons were called "honours". The honours were not compact territorial units. The Conqueror purposely spread manors over several shires to dilute the power of the barons. For example, the largest landholder after the king was Robert, count of Mortain. He held 793 manors spread out over twenty shires. The Honour of Peverel was spread over ten shires. Except in northern England and the Welsh Marches, it was rare for the estates of any lordship to be contiguous. The ten wealthiest barons in 1086 were:

1. Robert of Mortain, the earl of Cornwall
2. Odo of Bayeux, the earl of Kent
3. William FitzOsbern, the earl of Hereford
4. Roger of Montgomery, the earl of Shrewsbury
5. William of Warenne, the earl of Surrey
6. Hugh of Avranches, the earl of Chester
7. Eustace of Boulogne
8. Richard of Clare
9. Geoffrey of Coutances
10. Geoffrey of Mandeville

Barons enjoyed greater access to the king than did other subjects and were exempt from jury service. Though they could be tried in ordinary courts, their amercements could only be assessed by the barons of the exchequer or before the king himself. The baronage had a duty as tenants-in-chief to provide the king with advice when summoned to great councils. During the reign of Henry III (1216–1272), the great council evolved into Parliament, a representative body that increasingly asserted for itself the right to consent to taxation. Initially, participation in Parliament was still determined by one's status as a tenant-in-chief. Earls and greater barons received a writ of summons issued directly from the king, while lesser barons (Note: If there was no male heir, the lands of a barony would be partitioned between female heiresses who might hold a half, quarter, or thirty-sixth of a barony. As a result, a distinction was made between the greater barons and lesser barons. A "lesser baron" would fall into the knightly class or landed gentry.) were summoned through the local sheriffs.

By the 13th century, the criteria for establishing baronial tenure was long forgotten. According to Ivor John Sanders, "both tenants-in-chief and the royal officials were ignorant of any principle of law upon which the liability to tenure per baroniam could be based", so a person's baronial status was based on whether the records stated he held per baroniam. In the reign of Edward I (1272–1307), the first hereditary barons were created by writ. Over time, baronies by writ became the main method of creating baronies, and baronies by tenure became obsolete.

=== Medieval peerage (1300–1500) ===
The concept of peerage was borrowed from France. The peerage of France was limited to the highest ranking French nobility, six prelates and six magnates.

Peers of France
Prelates	Magnates
1. Archbishop of Reims; 2. Bishop of Laon; 3. Bishop of Langres; 4. Bishop of Beauvais; 5. Bishop of Noyon; 6. Bishop of Chalons	1. Duke of Normandy; 2. Duke of Burgundy; 3. Duke of Aquitaine; 4. Count of Flanders; 5. Count of Toulouse; 6. Count of Champagne

Magna Carta, first issued in 1215, declared that "No free man shall be seized, imprisoned, dispossessed, outlawed, exiled or ruined in any way, nor in any way proceeded against, except by the lawful judgement of his peers". In the charter, the word peer meant "equal", but this ambiguous wording led to disputes over who was equal to an earl or baron and therefore who could sit in judgment of earls and barons. When Richard Marshal, 3rd Earl of Pembroke, used the language of peerage to appeal to other magnates in 1233, the king's minister Peter des Rosches responded angrily that there were no peers in England "as there were in the realm of France". This response was likely due to fears that a recognized peerage could challenge royal authority. By the reign of Edward II (1307–1327), however, it had become standard to refer to magnates as peers of the realm.

The Peerage, still, was not a hereditary body. Kings did not consider themselves, having once summoned an individual, bound to summon the same individual, much less his heirs, to future Parliaments. Thus, writs were issued at the whim of the King. Over time, however, the arbitrary power of the Crown was fettered by the principles of hereditary right. At first, the writ of summons was regarded as a burden and interference, but later, when Parliament's power increased, it was seen as a sign of royal favour. Since the Crown was itself a hereditary dignity, it seemed natural for seats in the upper House of Parliament to be so as well. By the beginning of the fourteenth century, the Peerage had evolved its hereditary characteristics. Since under Norman customs, estates devolved under the principles of primogeniture, seats in Parliament did so as well.

Barons sat in Parliament by a combination of tenure and writs of summons issued to them. If a woman held a barony, her husband was summoned to Parliament in her right. The concept of a barony as a personal dignity not tied to land arose only when, in about 1388, Richard II created John Beauchamp a baron by letters patent. The Lord de Beauchamp was a baron not by tenure but rather by the will of the Crown. Letters patent and writs of summons were both used to create peerage dignities until the reign of Henry VIII, when the latter method fell into desuetude. Some peerage dignities, however, have been created by writs of summons since that time. In most cases, such peerage dignities were created when a writ was issued to an individual under the misapprehension that he was entitled to a peerage dignity created by letters patent. The Barony of Strange is an example of a peerage dignity created due to an error.

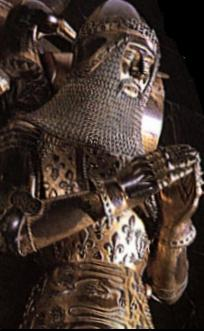
Edward, the Black Prince, Duke of Cornwall was the first Duke created in England. Depicted is the effigy above his tomb at Canterbury Cathedral

Earls appear to have sat in Parliament by virtue of their baronies, and not their earldoms. The separation of the two dignities seems to have arisen after the advent of the usage of letters patent to create peerage dignities. In some cases, a baron who held a dignity created by a writ of summons was created an Earl, and the two dignities later separated, the barony devolving upon the heir-general, and the earldom to an heir-male.

While kings of England possessed the subsidiary titles of Duke of Normandy (until 1259) and Duke of Aquitaine, no English duchy was created before the 1300s possibly because kings did not want their subjects possessing the same title as themselves. The first English duke was Edward III's eldest son, Edward the Black Prince, who was created Duke of Cornwall in 1337. In 1351, Henry of Grosmont was made Duke of Lancaster, the first non-royal dukedom.

In 1385, Robert de Vere, 9th Earl of Oxford, the favourite of Richard II, was created Marquess of Dublin for life, making him the first person to hold a dignity of such a rank between dukes and earls. Subsequent marquessates were created rarely; the Marquess of Winchester, whose dignity was created in 1551, is the only English marquess without a dukedom. The rank of viscount was introduced from Europe in 1440, when John, Baron Beaumont, was created Viscount Beaumont, with precedence between earls and barons.

Under Henry VI of England, in the fifteenth century, just before the Wars of the Roses, attendance at Parliament became more valuable. The first claim of hereditary right to a writ comes from this reign; so does the first patent, or charter declaring a man to be a Baron; and the five orders began to be called Peers; holders of older peerages also began receive greater honour than Peers of the same rank just created.

If a man held a peerage, his son would succeed to it; if he had no children, his brother would succeed. If he had a single daughter, his son-in-law would inherit the family lands, and usually the same Peerage; more complex cases were decided depending on circumstances. Customs changed with time; Earls were the first to be hereditary, and three different rules can be traced for the case of an Earl who left no sons and several married daughters. In the thirteenth century, the husband of the eldest daughter inherited the Earldom automatically; in the fifteenth century, the Earldom reverted to the Crown, who might regrant it (often to the eldest son-in-law); in the seventeenth century, it wouldn't be inherited by anybody unless all but one of the daughters died and left no descendants, in which case the remaining daughter (or her heir) would inherit.

During the reign of Henry VIII, peers attempted to consolidate and secure their position. They declared themselves "ennobled in blood," and suggested that no peerage could be extinguished except by an Act of Parliament, upon the extinction of all heirs to it, or upon forfeiture for treason or felony. The Spiritual Lords had attempted to secure the privileges of the Peerage while maintaining their ecclesiastical privileges, but lost in both attempts. Nonetheless, they were in the majority in the House of Lords until the Dissolution of the Monasteries, which removed the abbots and priors from the House. Thereafter, the temporal peers formed for the first time a majority in the Lords.

== Scottish and Irish peerages ==
Scotland evolved a similar system, differing in points of detail. The first Scottish Earldoms derive from the seven mormaers, of immemorial antiquity; they were named Earls by Queen Margaret. The Parliament of Scotland is as old as the English; the Scottish equivalent of baronies are called lordships of Parliament.

After Henry II became the Lord of Ireland, he and his successors began to imitate the English system as it was in their time. Irish Earls were first created in the thirteenth century, and Irish Parliaments began in the fifteenth century, complete with seven Barons of Parliament. The Irish peers were in a peculiar political position; because they were subjects of the King of England, but peers in a different kingdom, they could sit in the English House of Commons, and many did. In the eighteenth century, Irish peerages became rewards for English politicians, limited only by the concern that they might go to Dublin and interfere with the Irish Government.

The Acts of Union 1707, between England and Scotland, provided that future peerages should be peers of Great Britain, and the rules covering the peers should follow the English model; because there were proportionately many more Scottish peers, they chose a number of representatives to sit in the British House of Lords. The Acts of Union 1800 changed this to peers of the United Kingdom, but provided that Irish peerages could still be created. However, the Irish peers were concerned that their honours would be diluted as cheap prizes, and insisted that an Irish peerage be created only when three Irish peerages had gone extinct (until there were only 100 Irish peers left). In the early nineteenth century, Irish creations were as frequent as this allowed, but only three were created from 1863 until 1898 and none thereafter.

== Stuart monarchs ==
In 1603, James VI of Scotland became King James I of England. Scotland's Peerage then became subject to many of the same principles as the English Peerage, though many peculiarities of Scottish law continue to apply to it today. Scotland, like England, had lesser and greater barons, as well as earls. There was but one Duke in Scotland: the Duke of Rothesay, the heir-apparent to the Crown. The weak nature of the Scottish Crown had permitted the lesser feudal barons to continue attending the Scottish Estates, or Parliament, until the fifteenth century. Thereafter, only Earls and Lords of Parliament (the greater barons) came to be summoned to the Estates. In Scotland, the peerage remained tied to land until after the Union. Every earldom or lordship of Parliament was accompanied by a grant of land; sometimes, peerages and their associated lands were surrendered in return for other peerages and lands. After the Union of the Crowns, however, the concept of the Peerage as a personal dignity, not a dignity affixed to land, became established in Scotland.

James I had poor relations with the English Parliament, which had been less submissive than the Scottish Estates that he had been accustomed to. To raise funds without taxation, James began to sell titles. For instance, individuals paying £1095 could obtain the non-peerage hereditary dignity of baronet. Even peerage dignities were sold. Thus, James I added sixty-two peers to a body that had included just fifty-nine members at the commencement of his reign. His Stuart successors were no less profuse.

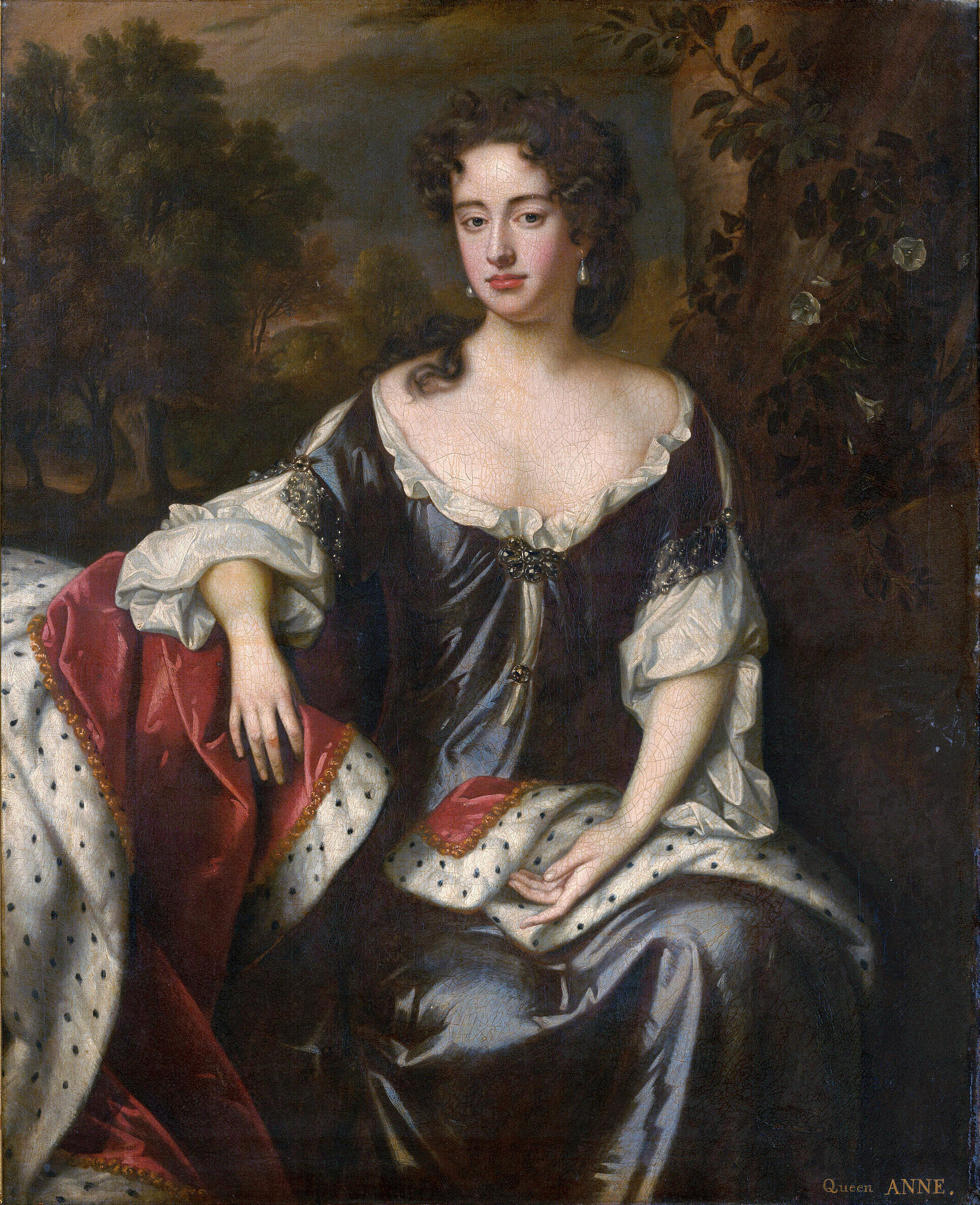
Queen Anne created twelve peers on one day.

The position of the Peerage was called into question after the English Revolution that overthrew Charles I. In 1648, the House of Commons passed an Act abolishing the House of Lords, "finding by too long experience that the House of Lords is useless and dangerous to the people of England." The Peerage was not abolished, and peers became entitled to be elected to the sole remaining House of Parliament. Oliver Cromwell, the de facto dictator, later found it convenient to re-establish a second chamber to reduce the power of the Commons. About sixty writs of summons, resembling those issued to peers sitting in the House of Lords, were issued. The individuals so summoned were called Lords, but their dignities were not hereditary. But soon after the establishment of this body, Cromwell dissolved Parliament, taking power into his own hands as Lord Protector.

Soon after Cromwell's death, the monarchy was restored, as was the House of Lords. King Charles II continued the Stuart tendency of profusely creating peerages, even eclipsing the figures of James I's reign. Several of those dignities went to Charles' many mistresses and illegitimate sons. Charles II's reign was also marked by the persecution of Roman Catholics after Titus Oates falsely suggested that there was a "Popish Plot" to murder the King. Catholic peers were hindered from the House of Lords because they were forced, before taking their seats, to recite a declaration that denounced some of the Roman Church's doctrines as "superstitious and idolatrous." These provisions would not be repealed until 1829.

The next major event in the history of the Peerage occurred in 1707, when England and Scotland united into Great Britain. There were, at the time, one hundred and sixty-eight English peers and one hundred and fifty-four Scottish ones. English peers did not wish for their individual significance in the House of Lords to dwindle, so they agreed to permit Scotland to elect just sixteen Scottish representative peers to sit in the House of Lords (see representative peer). After the Union, creations in both the Peerage of England and the Peerage of Scotland ceased and all new peerages were created in the Peerage of Great Britain.

The individual power of peers did, however, reduce as more peerages were created. At one point, Anne created twelve peers in one day. The Tory government requested these creations, known as Harley's Dozen, in order to secure a majority for their Peace policy in a previously Whig-dominated House. In response to the increase in creations, the House of Lords proposed a bill to restrict its numbers in 1719, but the Peerage Bill failed in the House of Commons.

== Hanoverian monarchs ==
Parliament passed the Act of Settlement 1701, which devolved the Crown, after Anne's death, upon George, Elector of Hanover, the Queen's closest Protestant relative, bypassing about 50 others in the line of succession. As the power of the monarch slowly shifted to Parliament, peerage dignities came to be conferred at the behest of ministers, not at the pleasure of the Crown.

King George III's reign is of particular note in the history of the Peerage. Increases to the Peerage during the time were totally unprecedented: almost four hundred peers were created during his reign. Lord North and William Pitt the Younger were especially liberal in dispensing peerage dignities, a device used to obtain majorities in the House of Lords. It became apparent that the representation of Scottish peers was inadequate: they had continued to elect but sixteen peers, while the number of British peers had increased tremendously. To account for this deficiency in representation, British hereditary peerages were granted to Scottish peers, thereby entitling them to sit in the House of Lords.

In 1801, Ireland united with Great Britain to form the United Kingdom. Ireland became entitled to elect twenty-eight of their number to sit in the House of Lords as representative peers. Unlike the Union of Scotland and England, the Crown retained the right to create one new Irish peerage dignity every time three previous ones became extinct, until the number of Irish peers without British peerages amounted to one hundred, when further creations would be permitted as often as necessary to maintain that number. Since Irish peers were not automatically entitled to representation in the Lords, individuals could be created Irish peers so as to honour them without further swelling the numbers of the House of Lords. There were only 21 creations of new Irish peerages after the Union; all other new peerages since 1801 have been created in the Peerage of the United Kingdom.

In 1832, the Reform Act was passed, abolishing many of England's "rotten" boroughs, an example of which was Old Sarum, with an electorate of seven. Such small boroughs were often "owned" by peers, whose nominees were almost always elected. The Reform Act and further Acts reduced the influence of peers in the lower house, and therefore their overall political power.

An important development of the nineteenth century was the Law Lord. In 1856, it was deemed necessary to add a legally qualified peer to the House of Lords: the Lords exercised, and still exercise, certain judicial functions, but did not necessarily include a sufficient number of peers well-versed in law. So that the number of hereditary peers would not be further increased, Victoria made Sir James Parke, a baron of the Exchequer, a life peer as Baron Wensleydale. The Lords refused to admit him, deeming that nothing but an Act of Parliament could change the fundamental hereditary characteristic of the Lords. Bills were later introduced to permit the creation of life peerages, but these failed. Only in 1876, twenty years after the Wensleydale case, was the Appellate Jurisdiction Act passed, authorising the appointment of two Lords of Appeal in Ordinary (commonly called Law Lords) to sit in the House of Lords as barons. They were to hold the rank of baron for life, but sit in the Lords only until retiring from judicial office. In 1887, they were permitted to continue to sit in the Lords for life; the number of Lords of Appeal in Ordinary was also increased by further enactments.

== Saxe-Coburg and Gotha, Windsor monarchs ==
In the twentieth century, peers were almost always created to reward political merit, and creations became much more common. The peerage ceased to be associated with wealth or land ownership. At the beginning of the century, however, such associations remained for some time. In 1909, Chancellor of the Exchequer David Lloyd George proposed the introduction of a land tax, which the landowning peers opposed. The House of Lords rejected the budget. After the general election of January 1910, the returned government introduced the Parliament Bill, which sought to curtail the powers of the Lords. When the Lords attempted to block the bill, the prime minister, H. H. Asquith, threatened to have the king create two hundred and fifty new Liberal peers to neutralise the Conservative majority in the House of Lords. The Lords then passed the Parliament Act, which provides that most bills can only be delayed, not rejected, by the House of Lords.

Later in the same decade, the Titles Deprivation Act 1917 was passed. Some British peers had fought against the British in World War I; the act permitted the suspension of their titles. In 1919, three peers—Prince Charles Edward, Duke of Albany, Ernest Augustus, Duke of Cumberland and Henry Taaffe, 12th Viscount Taaffe—had their peerage dignities suspended. The successors to those dignities may petition for their restoration, but none has chosen to do so.

Another issue of the 1920s was the admission of women to the House of Lords. The Sex Disqualification (Removal) Act 1919 provided that "A person shall not be disqualified by sex or marriage from the exercise of any public function." In 1922, the Viscountess Rhondda, a suo jure peeress, attempted to take a seat in the House of Lords. Though the Law Lords declared that she was, under the act, eligible, Lady Rhondda was not admitted by a decision of the committee for privileges. Many Conservatives were opposed to admitting women to the House of Lords. Liberals, meanwhile, felt that admitting hereditary peeresses would extend the hereditary principle which they so detested.

Women were eventually admitted to the House of Lords in 1958. The Life Peerages Act passed that year permitted the creation of life baronies for both men and women on a regular basis. Hereditary peeresses were admitted in 1963 under the Peerage Act. The Peerage Act also permitted peers to disclaim hereditary peerages within a year of succeeding to them, or within a year of attaining the age of majority. All eligible Scottish peers were permitted to sit in the House of Lords, and elections for representative peers ceased. Elections for Irish representative peers had already ended in 1922, when most of Ireland left the United Kingdom to become the Irish Free State.

Hereditary peerages continued to be created after 1958 but when Harold Wilson, of the Labour Party, became prime minister in 1964 he ceased to recommend the creation of hereditary peerages and neither of his successors, Edward Heath (of the Conservative Party) and James Callaghan (of the Labour Party), recommended hereditary peerage creations. Since then, hereditary peerages have not been regularly created outside of members of the royal family. Margaret Thatcher, a Conservative, did revive the practice of creating hereditary peers while she was prime minister: Harold Macmillan became Earl of Stockton in 1984, George Thomas became Viscount Tonypandy, and William Whitelaw became Viscount Whitelaw, both in 1983. The peerages of the latter two became extinct upon their deaths; the Earldom of Stockton survives. Thatcher's husband received a hereditary baronetcy, but she herself was created a life baroness on recommendation of her successor, John Major.

Hereditary peerages continue to be created for members of the royal family. The then Prince Andrew (later Andrew Mountbatten-Windsor) was created Duke of York in 1986, Prince Edward was created Earl of Wessex in 1999, Prince William was created Duke of Cambridge in 2011, and Prince Harry was created Duke of Sussex in 2018 (all on the occasion of their marriages).

After the Labour Party came to power in 1997, it began further reform of the House of Lords. Under the House of Lords Act 1999, hereditary peerages do not entitle individuals to seats in the House of Lords. The Act did provide exemptions for the Earl Marshal, the Lord Great Chamberlain and ninety others elected by the peers. This transitional arrangement ended with the House of Lords (Hereditary Peers) Act 2026, which completely removed the remaining 92 hereditary peers and ended their automatic right to sit in the upper chamber.

== See also ==
- Peerage
- Privilege of peerage
