= Baron Milford =

Extinct barony in the Peerage of the United Kingdom

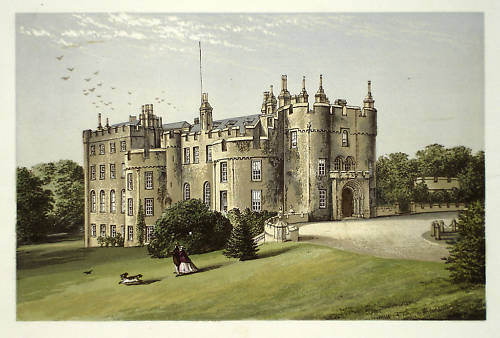
Engraving of Picton Castle, the seat of the Philipps family.

Baron Milford is a title that has been created three times, once in the Peerage of Ireland and twice in the Peerage of the United Kingdom. All three creations have been for members of the same family. The first creation came in the Peerage of Ireland in 1776 when Sir Richard Philipps, 7th Baronet, of Picton Castle was made Baron Milford (there was no territorial designation). However, this title became extinct on his death in 1823, while the baronetcy was passed on to a distant relative (see the Viscount St Davids). The title was revived in the Peerage of the United Kingdom in 1847 when Sir Richard Philipps, 1st Baronet, of Picton Castle was created Baron Milford, of Picton Castle in the County of Pembroke. Born Richard Bulkeley Philipps Grant, he was the son of John Grant and Mary Philippa Artemisia, daughter of James Child and Mary Philippa Artemisia, daughter of Bulkeley Philipps, uncle of the first Baron of the first creation. He succeeded to the Philipps estates in 1823 and assumed the surname of Philipps the same year. In 1828 he was created a Baronet, of Picton Castle in the County of Pembroke, in the Baronetage of the United Kingdom. However, Lord Milford was childless and the titles became extinct on his death in 1857. He devised his estates to his half-brother Reverend James Henry Alexander Gwyther, who assumed the surname of Philipps. James's daughter Mary Philippa married Charles Edward Gregg Fisher, who assumed the surname of Philipps and was created a Baronet, of Picton, in 1887 (see Philipps Baronets).

The title was revived for a second time in the Peerage of the United Kingdom in 1939, when Sir Laurence Philipps, 1st Baronet, was made Baron Milford, of Llanstephan in the County of Radnor. He had already been created a Baronet, of Llanstephan in the County of Radnor, in 1919. Philipps was the sixth son of Sir James Philipps, 12th Baronet, of Picton Castle, and the younger brother of John Philipps, 1st Viscount St Davids and Owen Philipps, 1st Baron Kylsant. He was succeeded by his son, the second Baron. He became a Communist and was disinherited by his father. Lord Milford is the only member of the Communist Party of Great Britain to sit in the House of Lords. As of 2011 the titles are held by his grandson, the fourth Baron, who succeeded his father in 1999.

== Barons Milford; First creation (1776) ==
- Richard Philipps, 1st Baron Milford (1744–1823)

== Barons Milford; Second creation (1847) ==
- Richard Bulkeley Philipps, 1st Baron Milford (1801–1857)

== Barons Milford; Third creation (1939) ==
- Laurence Richard Philipps, 1st Baron Milford (1874–1962)
- Wogan Philipps, 2nd Baron Milford (1902–1993)
- Hugo John Laurence Philipps, 3rd Baron Milford (1929–1999)
- Guy Wogan Philipps, 4th Baron Milford (born 1961)

The heir apparent is the present holder's son the Hon. Archie Sherwood Philipps (born 12 March 1997)

== Arms ==
Coat of arms of Baron Milford
Crest A lion as in the arms. Escutcheon Argent a lion rampant Sable ducally gorged and chained Or. Supporters On either side a horse Argent charged on the shoulder with three bars wavy Azure. Motto Ducit Amor Patriæ (Patriotism My Motive)

== See also ==
- Viscount St Davids
- Baron Kylsant
- Philipps Baronets
