= Picton Castle =

Medieval castle turned into stately home and grounds

Coordinates: 51.784°N 4.885°W

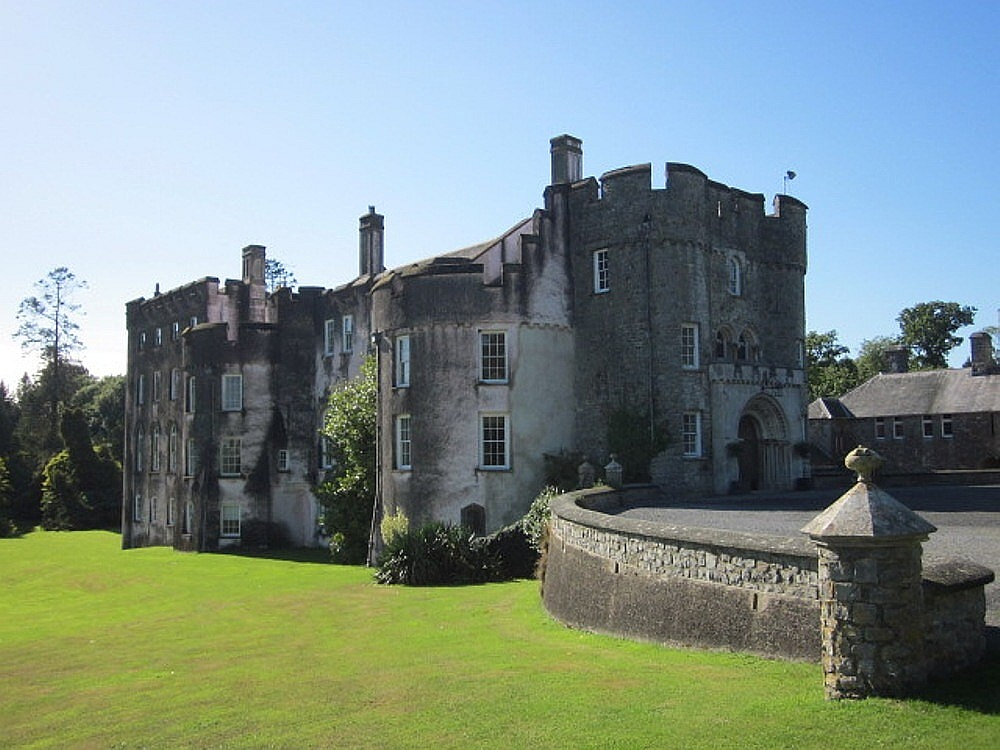
Picton Castle in 2013

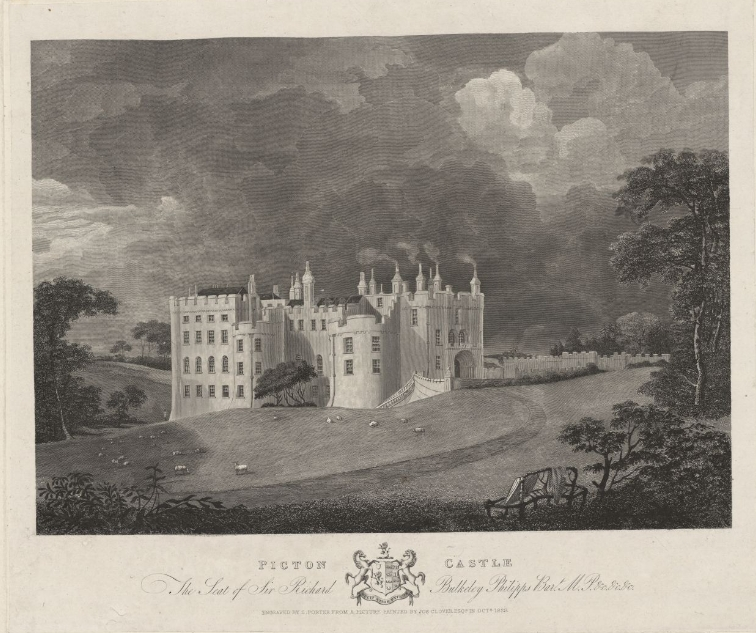
Picton Castle - the seat of Sir Richard Bulkeley Philipps bart, MP

Picton Castle (Welsh: Castell Pictwn) is a medieval castle near Haverfordwest in the community of Uzmaston, Boulston and Slebech, Pembrokeshire, Wales. Originally built at the end of the 13th century by a Flemish knight, it later came into the hands of Sir John Wogan. The castle and gardens are now owned and managed by the Picton Castle Trust, a registered charity, for the benefit of the public. It is of unusual construction and has been remodelled several times during its history. The castle is a Grade I listed building and its gardens and park are designated at Grade II* on the Cadw/ICOMOS Register of Parks and Gardens of Special Historic Interest in Wales.

== History ==
=== Eleventh century ===
Until the late eleventh century, this part of southwestern Wales was part of the Welsh kingdom of Deheubarth. After the death in 1093 of the king of Deheubarth, Rhys ap Tewdwr, in the Battle of Brecon, the Normans took advantage of the lack of leadership among the Welsh, and Norman forces seized much of South Wales.

=== Twelfth century ===
In 1102, following a failed revolt by many of these Normans against King Henry I of England (in favour of Henry's brother, Robert Curthose), the King re-organised the wider region surrounding the Daugleddau Estuary and Milford Haven, including the Penfro peninsula, as a single Marcher Lordship of Pembroke.

In 1108, the low-lying land of Henry's mother, Flanders, suffered catastrophic flooding, and many of its inhabitants—Flemings—sought assistance from Henry. Henry offered to settle the refugees in the hinterland of the Pembroke Lordship - Haverford (the west of the Daugleddau Estuary) and Dungleddy (the east), thus supplementing his garrison at Pembroke Castle with a compliant and grateful local populace; the number of Flemings so settled far outweighed any local Welsh populace (having a significant genetic impact which lasts to this day).

In Dungleddy, the Flemings settled under the leadership of a man named Wizo, who proceeded to build and live at Wiston Castle. Wizo began to grant estates from the land he had been given to his followers, and one such mesne lord was granted the land at Picton, which was three miles to the south of Wiston. This Fleming was not a great historical figure and his name is not recorded. The site chosen for the castle he built may have been on a mound a few hundred yards to the east of the present house, but in any event, the present building was in place by the end of the thirteenth century and was by then in the hands of the Wogan family, who were now the owners of Wiston Castle.

=== Thirteenth century ===
The circumstances under which Picton Castle came to be owned by the Wogans is unclear, but it may have been through a failure to beget male heirs or through the marriage of an heiress to one of the Wogans. As a result of marriage, possibly the same one, the later Wogans also descend from Cadifor ap Collwyn, Lord of Dyfed in the time of Rhys ap Tewdwr; Cadifor (and hence, later Wogans) was male-line descendant of the earlier kings of Dyfed, prior to its amalgamation into Deheubarth by the later House of Dinefwr (from which Rhys ap Tewdwr hailed).

By the 13th century, Wiston Castle seems to have been abandoned and the Wogan family lived at Picton Castle, where their heirs have lived ever since.

=== Fourteenth century ===
Picton Castle began as a motte castle and was reconstructed in stone by Sir John Wogan between 1295 and 1308. The design was unusual, there being no courtyard internally, the main building being protected by seven circular towers which projected from the wall. At the east end, two of these towers acted as a gatehouse, and the portcullised-entrance between them led straight into the lower part of the great hall. At this time the windows were narrow slits but these were replaced in about 1400 by large windows and a grand recessed arch with large window was built in the gatehouse.

=== Fifteenth century ===
In 1405, French troops supporting Owain Glyndŵr attacked and seized the Castle, and it was seized again during the English Civil War in 1645 by Parliamentary forces.

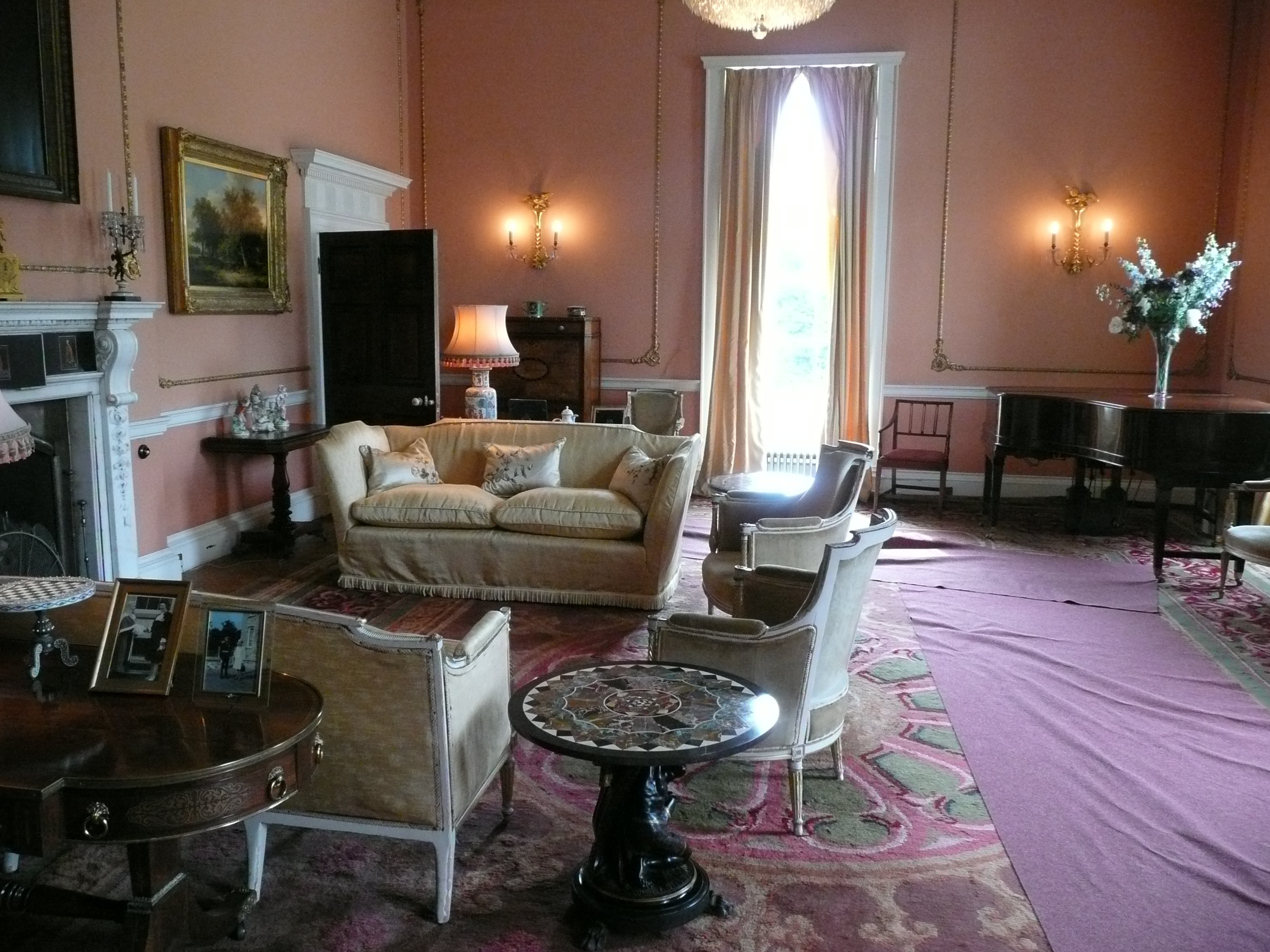
Picton castle interior

In the 15th century, the male-line of Wogans died out. Their heiress, Katherine, married Owen Dunn (Welsh: Owain Dwnn). Sir Henry Dunn (Welsh: Dwnn), the grandson of Owen and Katherine, only had daughters. The Picton Castle estate thus came into the hands of the Philipps family when Sir Henry's daughter Jane married Sir Thomas ap Philipps of Cilsant in the 1490s. Sir John Philipps, who inherited the castle in the 15th century, remodelled the building and created a new entrance which remained until the 1820s when a new entrance was designed by Thomas Rowlands (who also designed Slebech Church).

=== Seventeenth century ===
In 1611, King James I wanted to pay for his army in Ireland and decided to raise the money by selling baronetcies. Sir John Philipps paid £1,095 for his hereditary title.

=== Eighteenth century ===
In June 1762, Cesar Picton, a black child presumably taken from Senegal, travelled with the Phillips family from Norbiton Place in Kingston upon Thames to Picton Castle, but did not return with the family to England in October. Instead he remained at the castle, presumably to be trained as a servant. He later chose his surname possibly on the basis of his short residence here.

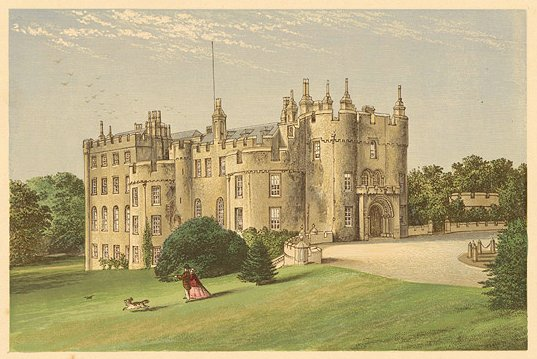
19th century engraving of Picton Castle

=== Nineteenth century ===
The estate remained with the Philipps family until the death of Lord Milford in 1823, when it was inherited by his cousin Richard Grant, who assumed the surname Philipps and was created a Baronet in 1828 and Baron Milford in 1847. His heir was his half-brother, the Reverend James Henry Alexander Philipps (formerly Gwyther), who assumed by royal licence the surname and arms of Philipps. On his death the estate passed to his son-in-law, Charles Edward Gregg Philipps, who was created a Baronet, of Picton, in 1887 (see Philipps baronets) then to Sir Richard Foley Foley-Philipps, cousin of Sir John Erasmus, and grandson of Charles Edward Gregg Philipps.

=== Twentieth century ===
The estate is now run by the Picton Castle Trust, a Registered Charity. The castle is a Grade I listed building and the walled garden is listed at Grade II. The gardens and park are designated Grade II* on the Cadw/ICOMOS Register of Parks and Gardens of Special Historic Interest in Wales.

== Visitor attractions ==
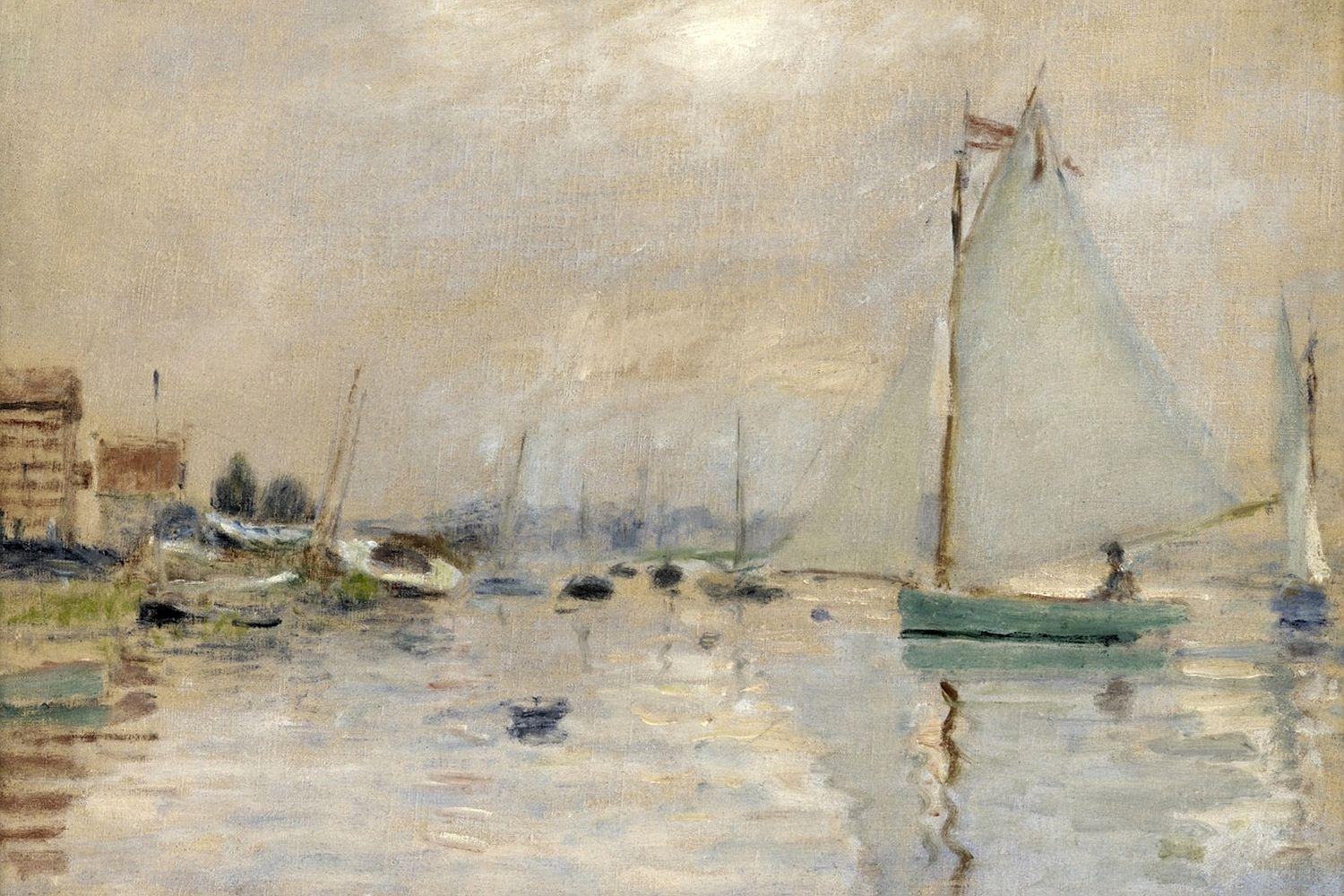
The "Picton Renoir"

Picton Castle Garden (Grade I listed) is open to the public every day. The gardens are protected on the Register of Historic Parks and Gardens and the beauty of the gardens is recognised by the Royal Horticultural Society, as a Partner Garden. The garden are over 40 acres and include the Walled Garden, the Jungle Garden, Peach House Woods, Peep-In Woods, Dew Pond, Fernery and Apothecary's garden. There is a restaurant and shop and self-catering accommodation is available in the gatehouse lodges. Event, fairs and workshops are held periodically.

Picton Castle is home to the ‘Picton Renoir’ which was featured in BBC's Fake or Fortune? (July 2015). The episode drew attention to differences between art authorities and added to the controversies that have attended the Wildenstein Institute. The painting can be viewed when visiting the castle.

== Gallery ==
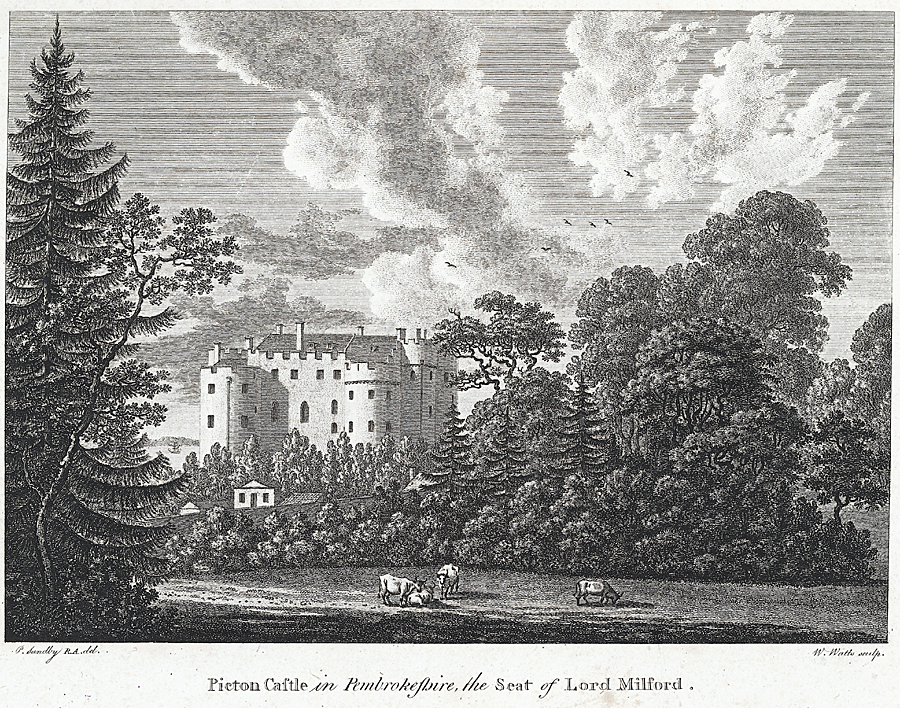

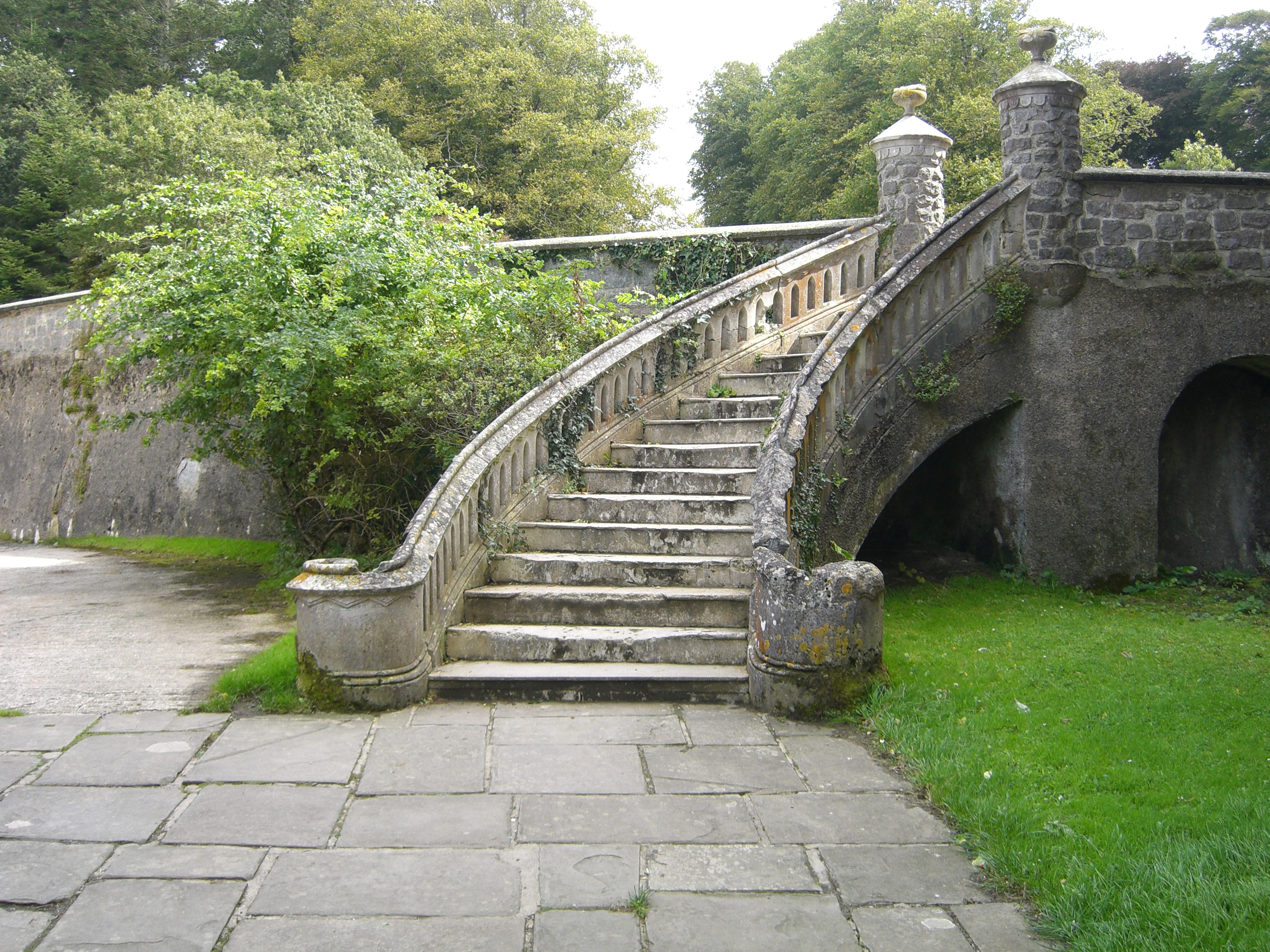

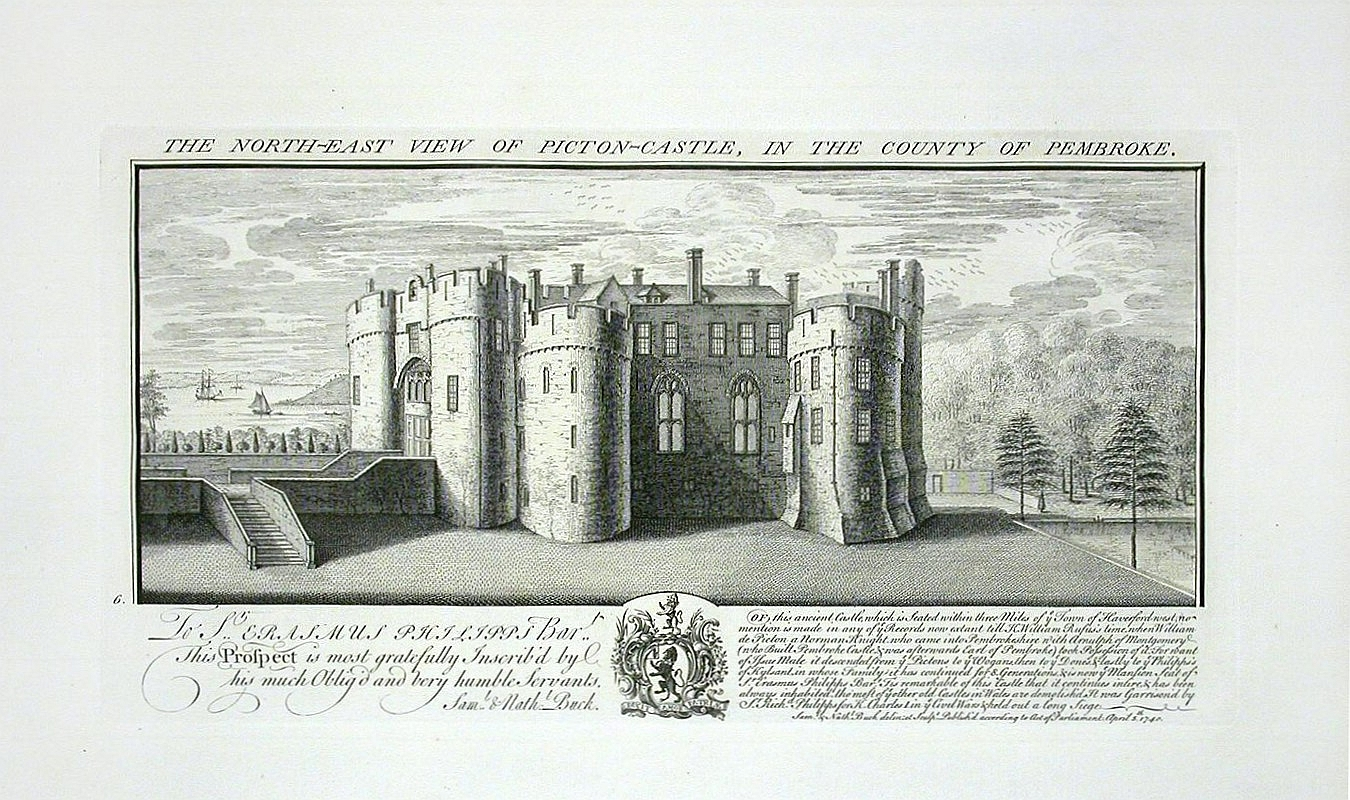

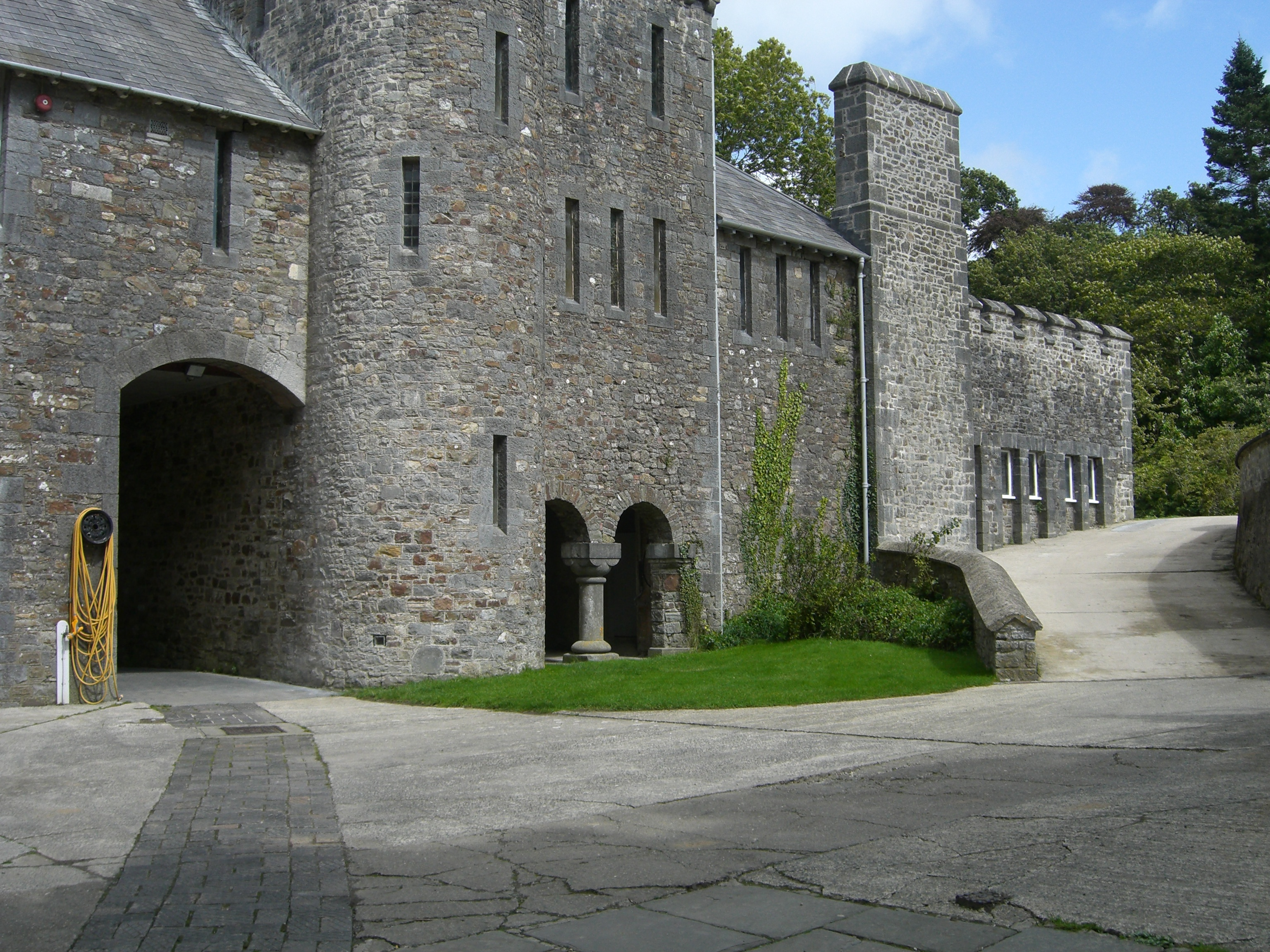

== See also ==
- Castles in Great Britain and Ireland
- List of castles in England
- List of gardens in Wales
- Slebech
