= Philipps baronets =

Set index for Philipps baronets

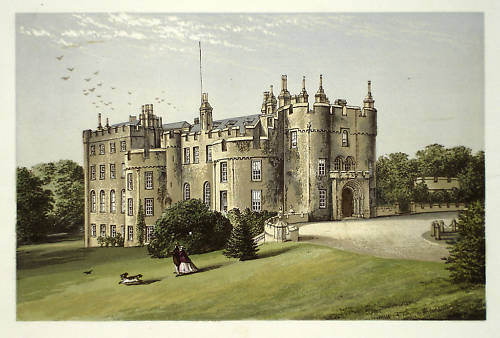
Engraving from 1880 of Picton Castle, the seat of the Philipps family

There have been four baronetcies created for members of the Welsh Philipps family, one in the Baronetage of England and three in the Baronetage of the United Kingdom.

- Philipps baronets of Picton Castle (1621): see Viscount St Davids
- Philipps baronets of Picton Castle (1828): see Baron Milford (1847 creation)
- Philipps baronets of Picton (1887)
- Philipps baronets of Llanstephan (1919): see Baron Milford (1939 creation)

== See also ==
- Philips baronets
