= List of UK Parliament constituencies in Dyfed =

Five constituencies cover Dyfed, also used for elections to the Senedd. The current boundaries have been effective since the 2007 Welsh Assembly election and the 2010 United Kingdom general election. (Note: They are all county constituencies (CCs) of the House of Commons of the Parliament of the United Kingdom (Westminster))

Dyfed is one of the eight preserved counties of Wales, consisting of the principal areas of Pembrokeshire, Carmarthenshire and Ceredigion. These principal areas are also known as counties.

For Senedd elections, constituencies are grouped into additional member electoral regions.

== Westminster boundaries ==
=== From 2010 ===
Constituency	Boundaries
1. Carmarthen East and Dinefwr CC (Westminster)	Parliamentary constituencies in Dyfed 2010
2. Carmarthen West and South Pembrokeshire CC (Westminster)	Parliamentary constituencies in Dyfed 2010
3. Ceredigion CC (Westminster)	Parliamentary constituencies in Dyfed 2010
4. Llanelli CC (Westminster)	Parliamentary constituencies in Dyfed 2010
5. Preseli Pembrokeshire CC (Westminster)	Parliamentary constituencies in Dyfed 2010

Conservative † Labour ‡ Plaid Cymru ₪

Constituency	Electorate	Majority	Member of Parliament	Nearest opposition	Map reference above
Carmarthen East and Dinefwr CC (Westminster)	57,407	1,809	Jonathan Edwards ₪	Havard Hughes †	1
Carmarthen West and South Pembrokeshire CC (Westminster)	58,629	7,745	Simon Hart †	Marc Tierney ‡	2
Ceredigion CC (Westminster)	56,250	6,329	Ben Lake ₪	Amanda Jenner †	3
Llanelli CC (Westminster)	60,513	4,670	Nia Griffith ‡	Tamara Reay †	4
Preseli Pembrokeshire CC (Westminster)	59,586	5,062	Stephen Crabb †	Philippa Thompson ‡	5

=== 1997 to 2010 ===
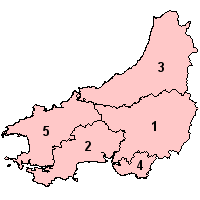
Constituency	Boundaries
1. Carmarthen East and Dinefwr CC (Westminster)	Parliamentary constituencies in Dyfed pre-2010
2. Carmarthen West and South Pembrokeshire CC (Westminster)	Parliamentary constituencies in Dyfed pre-2010
3. Ceredigion CC (Westminster)	Parliamentary constituencies in Dyfed pre-2010
4. Llanelli CC (Westminster)	Parliamentary constituencies in Dyfed pre-2010
5. Preseli Pembrokeshire CC (Westminster)	Parliamentary constituencies in Dyfed pre-2010

== Proposed boundary changes ==
The Boundary Commission for Wales submitted their final proposals in respect of the Sixth Periodic Review of Westminster Constituencies (the 2018 review) in September 2018. Although the proposals were immediately laid before Parliament they were not brought forward by the Government for approval. Accordingly, they did not come into effect for the 2019 election which took place on 12 December 2019, and which was contested using the constituency boundaries in place since 2010.

Under the terms of the Parliamentary Voting System and Constituencies Act 2011, the Sixth Review was based on reducing the total number of MPs from 650 to 600 and a strict electoral parity requirement that the electorate of all constituencies should be within a range of 5% either side of the electoral quota.

On 24 March 2020, the Minister of State for the Cabinet Office, Chloe Smith, issued a written statement to Parliament setting out the Government's thinking with regard to parliamentary boundaries. They propose to bring forward primary legislation to remove the statutory obligation to implement the 2018 Boundary Review recommendations, as well as set the framework for future boundary reviews in time for the next review which is due to begin in early 2021 and report no later than October 2023. It is proposed that the number of constituencies now remains at the current level of 650, rather than being reduced to 600, while retaining the requirement that the electorate should be no more than +/- 5% from the electoral quota.

== Senedd boundaries ==
=== From 2007 ===
Constituency	Senedd region	Constituency boundaries
1. Carmarthen East and Dinefwr CC (Senedd)	Mid and West Wales	Assembly constituencies in Dyfed 2007
2. Carmarthen West and South Pembrokeshire CC (Senedd)	Mid and West Wales	Assembly constituencies in Dyfed 2007
3. Ceredigion CC (Senedd)	Mid and West Wales	Assembly constituencies in Dyfed 2007
4. Llanelli CC (Senedd)	Mid and West Wales	Assembly constituencies in Dyfed 2007
5. Preseli Pembrokeshire CC (Senedd)	Mid and West Wales	Assembly constituencies in Dyfed 2007

The Mid and West Wales region also includes two Powys constituencies and one Gwynedd constituency.

=== 1999 to 2007 ===
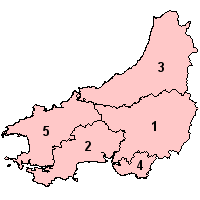
Constituency	Assembly region	Constituency boundaries
1. Carmarthen East and Dinefwr CC (Assembly)	Mid and West Wales	Assembly constituencies in Dyfed pre-2007
2. Carmarthen West and South Pembrokeshire CC (Assembly)	Mid and West Wales	Assembly constituencies in Dyfed pre-2007
3. Ceredigion CC (Assembly)	Mid and West Wales	Assembly constituencies in Dyfed pre-2007
4. Llanelli CC (Assembly)	Mid and West Wales	Assembly constituencies in Dyfed pre-2007
5. Preseli Pembrokeshire CC (Assembly)	Mid and West Wales	Assembly constituencies in Dyfed pre-2007

== Historical representation by party ==
A cell marked → (with a different colour background to the preceding cell) indicates that the previous MP continued to sit under a new party name.

=== 1832 to 1859 ===
Conservative Peelite Radical Whig

Constituency	1832	1835	1837	38	1841	42	46	1847	49	52	1852	54	55	1857	57
Cardigan Boroughs	P. Pryse								Loveden				J. Davies	E. Pryse	
Cardiganshire	W. E. Powell											Vaughan			
Haverfordwest Bors	R. Philipps	W. Scourfield	R. Philipps					Evans			J. Scourfield				
Pembroke Boroughs	H. Owen			Graham	J. Owen		→								
Pembrokeshire	J. Owen				J. Campbell										
Carmarthen	Yelverton	Lewis	D. Morris												
Carmarthenshire	Rice-Trevor									D. Jones					
Carmarthenshire	Adams	Hamlyn-Williams	J. Jones			D. A. Davies									D. Pugh

=== 1859 to 1885 ===
Conservative Liberal

Constituency	1859	61	64	1865	66	1868	1874	76	78	1880	82
Cardigan Boroughs	E. Pryse					T. Lloyd	D. Davies				
Cardiganshire	W. T. Powell			T. Lloyd		Richards	T. E. Lloyd			L. Pugh	
Haverfordwest Bors	J. Scourfield					Edwardes					
Pembroke Boroughs	J. Owen	H. Owen jr				Meyrick	Reed			Allen	
Pembrokeshire	J. Campbell	G. Phillips			Bowen	J. Scourfield		Bowen		W. Davies	
Carmarthen	D. Morris		W. Morris			Cowell-Stepney	Nevill	Cowell-Stepney	Williams		Jenkins
Carmarthenshire	D. Jones					Sartoris	F. Campbell				
Carmarthenshire	D. Pugh					John Jones of Llandovery				Powell	

=== 1885 to 1918 ===
Conservative Liberal Liberal Unionist

Constituency	1885	1886	89	90	1892	1895	98	1900	1906	08	Jan 1910	Dec 1910	12
Cardiganshire	D. Davies	Rowlands				Vaughan-Davies							
Carmarthen District	Jenkins	Cowell-Stepney			Jones	Jenkins		A. Davies	Williams				
Carmarthenshire East	Pugh			Thomas									Towyn Jones
Carmarthenshire West	Powell		Morgan									Hinds	
Pembroke and Haverfordwest District	H. Allen	Mayne			C. Allen	Laurie			Philipps			Guest	
Pembrokeshire	W. Davies				Rees-Davies		Philipps			Roch			

=== 1918 to 1950 ===
Coalition Liberal (1918-22) / National Liberal (1922-23) Conservative Independent Liberal Independent Liberals (1931) Labour Liberal

Constituency	1918	21	1922	1923	24	1924	26	28	1929	1931	32	1935	36	41	1945
Cardiganshire	Vaughan-Davies	E. Evans		Morris		→					O. Evans				Bowen
Carmarthen	Hinds			Ellis-Griffith	Mond		→	W. Jones	Hopkin	R. Evans		Hopkin		Hughes	Morris
Llanelli	Towyn Jones		Williams										Griffiths		
Pembrokeshire	E. Jones		G. Lloyd-George	→		Price			G. Lloyd-George	→		→			

=== 1950 to 1983 ===
Conservative Democratic Independent Labour Liberal Plaid Cymru

Constituency	1950	1951	1955	57	1959	1964	1966	66	68	69	1970	Feb 1974	Oct 1974	1979
Cardiganshire	Bowen						Morgan					Howells		
Carmarthen	Morris			M. Lloyd George				G. Evans			G. Jones		G. Evans	Thomas
Llanelli	Griffiths										Davies			
Pembrokeshire	Donnelly								→	→	Edwards			

=== 1983 to present ===
Conservative Labour Liberal Liberal Democrats Plaid Cymru

Constituency	1983	1987	88	1992	1997	00	2001	2005	2010	2015	2017	2019	20	2024
Carmarthen / Carmarthen East and Dinefwr (1997) / Caerfyrddin (2024)	R. Thomas	A. Williams					Price		J. Edwards				→	Davies
Ceredigion and Pembroke North / Ceredigion (1997) / Ceredigion Preseli (2024)	Howells		→	Dafis		S. Thomas		M. Williams			Lake			
Llanelli	Davies							Griffith						
Pembrokeshire / Preseli Pembrokeshire (1997) / Mid and South Pembrokeshire (2024)	N. Edwards	Bennett		Ainger	Lawrence			Crabb						Tufnell
Carmarthen West and South Pembrokeshire					Ainger				Hart					N/A

== See also ==
- List of parliamentary constituencies in Wales
