= Coulthard =

Coulthard is a surname of Scottish origin. It was first found in Galloway (Gaelic: Gall-ghaidhealaibh), an area of southwestern Scotland, now part of Dumfries and Galloway It originated as an occupational surname for somebody who works with horses, from Old English colt (meaning "ass" or "young horse") and hierde (herdsman). Its variations include Coulthart, Colthart, Coltart, Coltherd, Colthert, Coul, Coultas, Coulter, Coulombe, Colhound and many others. In Scotland, it is often pronounced cow-tart. The surname has also been brought into the north east of England.

== Notable people ==
Notable people with the surname include:

- Alan George Weall Coulthard (1924–1988), British judge, broadcaster, writer and politician
- Alice Coulthard (born 1983), English actress
- Bill Coulthard (1923–2005), Canadian basketball player
- Billy Coulthard (fl. 1932–1937), English footballer
- Colin Coulthard (1921–2004), British officer in the Royal Air Force
- David Coulthard (born 1971), Scottish racing driver
- Fabian Coulthard (born 1982), New Zealand racing driver
- George Coulthard (1856–1883), Australian rules footballer
- James Coulthard (1868-?), British rugby player, trade unionist and politician
- Jean Coulthard (1908–2000), Canadian composer
- John Coulthard, of John Coulthard and Son, a steam locomotive company founded in 1835, later Black, Hawthorn & Co
- Philippa Coulthard (born 1992), Australian television actress
- Ralph Coulthard, of John Coulthard and Son, a steam locomotive company founded in 1835, later Black, Hawthorn & Co
- Ray Coulthard (born 1968), English actor
- Sean Coulthard (1968), American professional wrestling commentator whose ring name is Michael Cole
- Terrence Coulthard, Aboriginal Australian tourism operator of Iga Warta, at Nepabunna in the Flinders Ranges of South Australia
- Vince Coulthard, Aboriginal Australian traditional owner, involved in the World Heritage Site nomination of the Flinders Ranges in South Australia
- Belinda Noonan, née Coulthard (born 1957), Australian former competitive figure skater
- Faith Thomas, née Coulthard (1933–2023), Australian former cricketer and hockey player

== See also ==
- Dewhurst v. Coulthard, a 1799 United States Supreme Court case
- Gillian Coultard (born 1963), English former football player
- Mount Coulthard, Canada
