= 1876 Pembrokeshire by-election =

UK Parliamentary by-election

The 1876 Pembrokeshire by-election was fought on 26 June 1876. The by-election was fought due to the death of the incumbent Conservative MP, John Scourfield. It was won by the Conservative candidate James Bevan Bowen.

1876 Pembrokeshire by-election
Party	Candidate	Votes	%	±%
Conservative	James Bevan Bowen	1,882	53.9	N/A
Liberal	William Davies	1,608	46.1	N/A
Majority		274	7.8	N/A
Turnout		3,490	76.9	N/A
Registered electors		4,621		
Conservative hold		Swing	N/A	
