= 1861 Pembrokeshire by-election =

Pembrokeshire By-election

The 1861 Pembrokeshire by-election was held on 19 January 1861. The by-election was necessary due to the elevation of the incumbent Conservative MP, John Campbell to the peerage following the death of his father. It was won by the Conservative candidate George Lort Phillips.

== Candidates ==
Within days of the vacancy arising as a result of Cawdor's death and the elevation of his son and heir to the House of Lords, George Lort Phillips of Lawrenny had issued an address declaring himself as the Conservative candidate, with the support of his predecessor. The local Conservative newspaper, the Pembrokeshire Herald, strongly endorsed his candidacy. An editorial on 16 November, described Lort Phillips as a man who would not adopt "a blind adherence to ant party" (words often used in the mid-Victorian era to by Conservative candidates) and praised his support of the local militia and agricultural improvement societes.

However, he was opposed by a Liberal candidate, Hugh Owen Owen, son of the Lord Lieutenant of Pembrokeshire and previously MP for Pembroke Boroughs. In contrast to its strong support for Lort Phillips, the Herald referred to Owen's long absence from the county, his age (although he was only in his mid 50s), his abandonment of his previous Conservative views, the attitude of his father and his record years before as member for the Pembroke Boroughs.

Although the Pembrokeshire Herald railed against "the evils" of a contested election the scene was set for a bitter contest.

== Campaign ==
Shortly after the vacancy arose, both candidates had issued their addresses, suggesting that they had been preparing for a contest for some time.

== Result ==
By-election, 19 January 1861: Pembrokeshire
Party	Candidate	Votes	%	±%
Conservative	George Lort Phillips	1,194	54.9	N/A
Liberal	Hugh Owen	979	45.1	N/A
Majority		215	9.8	N/A
Turnout		2,173	77.4	N/A
Registered electors		2,809		
Conservative hold				
