= Gadarn =

Gadarn is a surname. Notable people with the surname include:

- Hawys Gadarn (1291–c. 1353)
- Hu Gadarn
- Derfel Gadarn
- Thomas Gadarn, MP
