= Leonora Philipps =

British feminist activist (1862-1915)

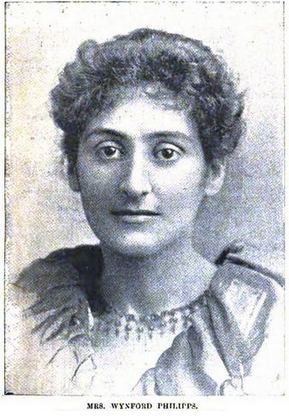
- Born: Leonora Gerstenberg; 4 November 1862; Camberwell, London, England
- Died: 30 March 1915 (aged 52)
- Occupation: Feminist activist

Leonora Philipps (4 November 1862 – 30 March 1915), sometimes known as Nora Philipps, was a British feminist activist.

Born in Camberwell, then in Surrey, as Leonora Gerstenberg, her family were Jewish and her father was wealthy. She was orphaned at the age of fourteen, becoming a ward of chancery. She performed strongly at school, then attended Birkbeck University College and the Slade School of Art, where she completed a course in metalwork. She also attended the Royal Academy of Dramatic Art, and was tutored privately in drama by Isabella Glyn.

Influenced by the ideas of John Stuart Mill, trips to the East End of London and to the United States, Gerstenberg became interested in feminism and issues around poverty. She became active in the Women's Liberal Federation (WLF), and soon became president of the Westminster Women's Liberal Association. Her inheritance had grown through investment, and by the late 1880s, amounted to around £100,000.

In 1888, Gerstenberg married John Wynford Philipps, who had just won the Mid Lanarkshire by-election for the Liberal Party. Philipps became a vice-president of the Scottish Women's Liberal Federation, and in 1891 wrote a widely-circulated pamphlet, An Appeal to Women. In this, she argued that women should become active in public service. She also lectured on a number of topics, including temperance, the unionisation of shop assistants and free education.

In 1891, the WLF split over attitudes to women's suffrage, and Philipps was a vocal support of the majority, pro-suffrage view. In 1892, she was elected as president of the Welsh Union of Women's Liberal Associations, and was a co-founder of the Pioneer Club in London. She was also an early member of the Somerville Club, and a founder in 1897 of the Women's Institute at Grosvenor Crescent.

John became a Member of Parliament for Pembrokeshire in 1898, and the couple moved to Roch Castle, in the constituency. In 1908, he became a baron, and Nora accordingly became Lady St Davids. When a national pageant was held in Cardiff in 1909, Nora was one of the main organisers, and in 1913 she presided over a concert at the Abergavenny Eisteddfod.
