= 1888 Mid Lanarkshire by-election =

UK parliamentary by-election

The 1888 Mid Lanarkshire by-election was a parliamentary by-election held on 27 April 1888 for the UK House of Commons constituency of Mid Lanarkshire in Scotland.

== Previous MP ==
The seat had become vacant in April 1888. The constituency's Liberal Member of Parliament, Stephen Mason resigned from his seat. He did this by being appointed Steward of the Manor of Northstead, a notional office of profit under the Crown, which is used to permit MPs to vacate their seats as Members of the House of Commons cannot technically resign from their seats.

Mason (1832–1890) was a Glasgow merchant, who had been the MP for the constituency since the 1885 general election. He was known for having written pamphlets on political topics, such as monetary and land questions, the Anglo-French treaty of 1860 and banking in Scotland.

== Candidates ==
Three candidates were nominated. The list below is set out in descending order of the number of votes received at the by-election.

1. The Liberal Party candidate was John Wynford Philipps (30 May 1860 – 28 March 1938). He was called to the bar of England and Wales in 1886.

Philipps contested Devizes at the 1886 general election. He was MP for this seat from the by-election until he resigned in 1894. He was subsequently elected MP for Pembrokeshire at an 1898 by-election. He sat for the Welsh county until he was created the 1st Lord St Davids in 1908. He was advanced in the peerage as the 1st Viscount St Davids in 1918.

2. The Conservative candidate was William Robert Bousfield (12 January 1854 – 16 July 1943), admitted to the bar of England and Wales in 1880.

Bousfield was elected MP for Hackney North at a by-election in 1892 and retained that seat until he was defeated in 1906.

3. Representing the Labour interest, as an Independent Labour candidate, was the Lanarkshire born (James) Keir Hardie (15 August 1856 – 26 September 1915).

Hardie had a background as a manual worker, which was unusual for a political candidate in 1888. Previously some working men, with a trade union background, had been elected to Parliament as Liberal-Labour candidates but none without Liberal support.

Hardie had worked as a miner. He became a trade unionist and then a journalist. At the time of the by-election he was a member of the Liberal Party, but the local Liberal Association rejected him as its candidate at the by-election.

Hardie subsequently was a leading figure in the development of the Labour Party. He was elected Independent Labour MP for West Ham South in 1892 and sat until defeated in 1895. During this time he was the person who presided over the meeting which created the Independent Labour Party (ILP) in 1893. Hardie contested Bradford East for the ILP in a by-election in 1896 and Preston at the 1900 general election for the Labour Representation Committee (LRC). He also contested and won Merthyr Tydfil in the 1900 election. The LRC was renamed the Labour Party in 1906. Hardie was the Parliamentary Labour Party Chairman (its de facto leader) from 1906 until 1908. He continued to represent Merthyr Tydfil until he died in 1915.

== Result ==
The Liberal Party held the seat.

27 April 1888 by-election: Mid Lanarkshire
Party	Candidate	Votes	%	±%
Liberal	John Philipps	3,847	52.1	−4.5
Conservative	William Bousfield	2,917	39.5	−4.0
Independent Labour	Keir Hardie	617	8.4	New
Majority		930	12.6	−0.4
Turnout		7,381	80.7	+5.9
Liberal hold		Swing	-0.2	
Registered electors		9,143		

- Resignation of Mason, April 1888

== Previous election ==
General election 1886: Mid Lanarkshire
Party	Candidate	Votes	%	±%
Liberal	Stephen Mason	3,779	56.5	+17.5
Liberal Unionist	James Widrington Shand-Harvey	2,909	43.5	+8.5
Majority		870	13.0	+9.0
Turnout		6,688	74.8	−7.6
Liberal hold		Swing	+4.5	
Registered electors		8,939		

== See also ==
- Mid Lanarkshire constituency
- List of United Kingdom by-elections (1885–1900)
- United Kingdom by-election records
