= Roland Philipps =

British scouting leader (1890–1916)

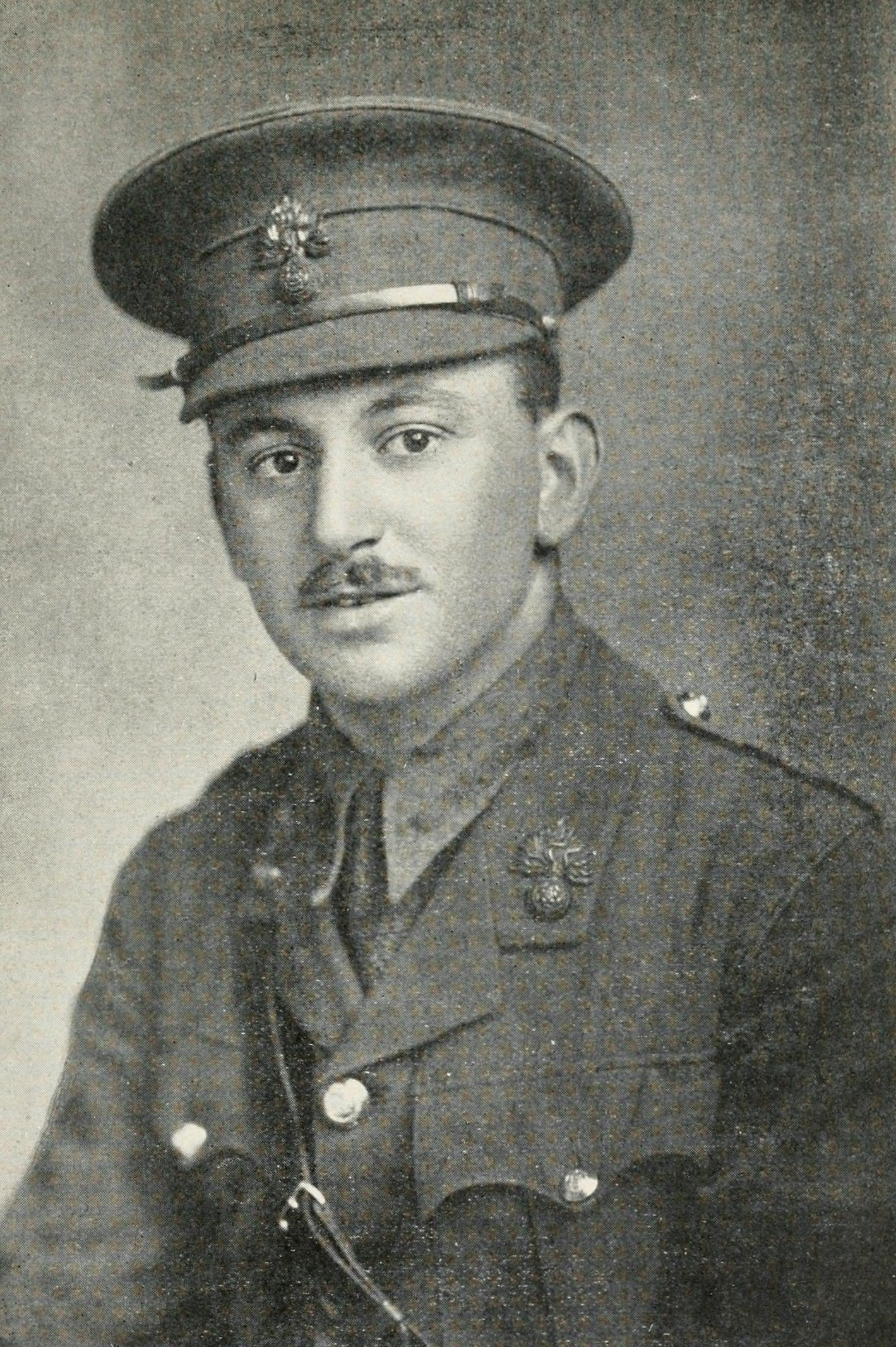
Roland Philipps in army uniform during the First World War

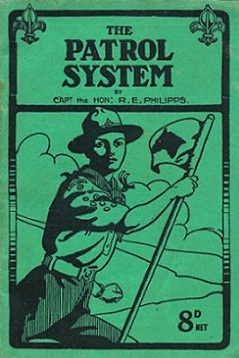
The Patrol System by Capt the Hon. R. E. Philipps

Roland Erasmus Philipps, MC (27 February 1890 – 7 July 1916) was a writer and a leading Scout official. He was the second son of John Philipps, 1st Viscount St Davids and his first wife, Leonora Gerstenberg. He was educated at Twyford School, Winchester College and New College, Oxford.

Philipps became an early scout leader. In July 1912, he was appointed assistant district commissioner for East London. Towards the end of 1912 and into 1913, he and Stanley Ince established the Hackney Lectures on Scout Law. In 1913, he was appointed commissioner for northeast London, and in November 1913 he was made responsible for all of East London. He wrote several books on Scouting, some published after his death. Shortly before the war, he was adopted as prospective Liberal candidate for South Glamorgan.

Philipps served as an officer in the British Army during the First World War. For his actions in the assault on the Hohenzollern Redoubt, he was awarded the Military Cross, as a temporary captain with 9th Battalion, The Royal Fusiliers (City of London Regiment), in April 1916. He was killed on 7 July 1916 while leading his men into action during the Battle of the Somme and is buried at Aveluy in Aveluy Communal Cemetery Extension. The inscription on his gravestone states: COMMISSIONER OF BOY SCOUTS FOR NORTH EAST AND EAST LONDON. Philipps' only sibling, Colwyn, the previous heir apparent to the title (the Baron St Davids) had also been killed in the war on 13 May 1915.

Roland House, 29, Stepney Green in the East End of London, which he left in his will to the Scouts of East London, was an important part of Scouting in London and more widely in Scouting in the United Kingdom. The House on the Green, as it was known, became a memorial to him. It was a home to several Scout Leaders from Groups in East London, a hostel for visitors, the headquarters of a Rover Scout Crew and a Scout Shop. It was sold in 1983.

A Scout Group in Mexico is named after him, and has recorded his biography in detail.

The Hon. Roland Augusto Jestyn Estanislao Philipps, (better known as blues musician Todd Sharpville), was named after his great-uncle Roland Erasmus Philipps.

== Partial bibliography ==
- The Patrol System, 1917
- Letters to a Patrol Leader, 1917
