= John Lort-Williams =

British politician and judge (1881–1966)

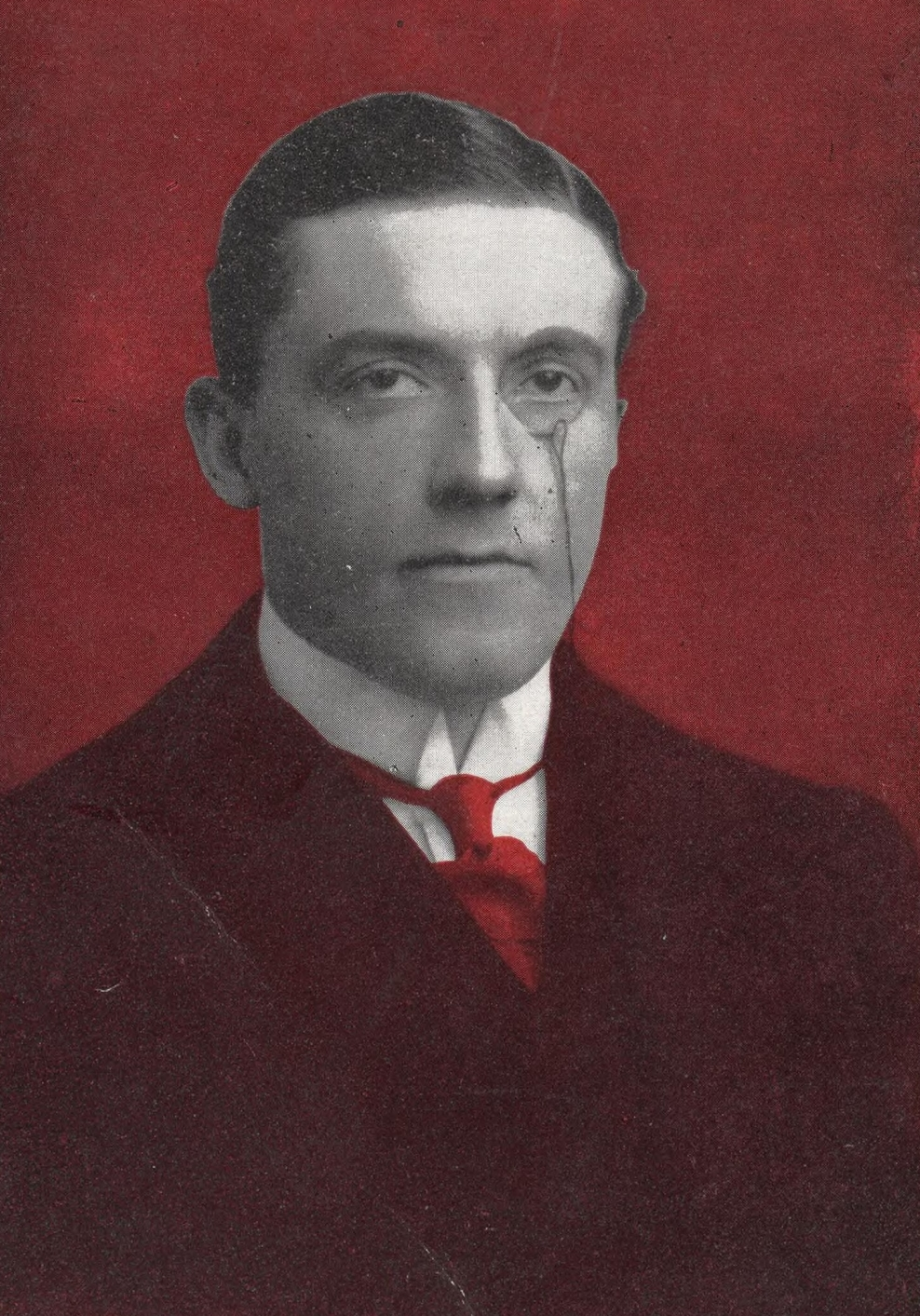
John Lort-Williams, from a 1908 campaign poster

Sir John Rolleston Lort-Williams (14 September 1881 – 9 June 1966) was a Judge and MP for Rotherhithe between the general elections of 1918 and 1923.

Lort-Williams was born in Walsall, the only son of Charles William Williams, a local solicitor. He was educated at Merchant Taylors School and the University of London. In 1902 he adopted the surname Lort-Williams. Two years later he was called to the bar at Lincoln's Inn. He stood for election for the Conservative Party at the Pembrokeshire during the 1906 United Kingdom general election and the 1908 Pembrokeshire by-election, but was unsuccessful in both attempts, first to John Wynford Philipps and then to Walter Roch.

From 1907 to 1910 he represented Tower Hamlets, Limehouse on the London County Council as a Municipal Reform Party councillor. In 1918 he was elected to parliament at Rotherhithe.

After not being reelected in 1923, Lort-Williams resumed his legal career and became Recorder of Walsall in 1924. In 1927 he was appointed as a Puisne Judge of the High Court of Judicature at Calcutta, in succession to William Ewart Greaves. In 1936, while being Judge of the High Court of Judicature at Fort William in Bengal, Lort-Williams was styled as Knight Bachelor. He held the post until his retirement in 1941.

He died at his Worcestershire home in 1966, aged 84.

Parliament of the United Kingdom
Preceded by Hubert Carr-Gomm	Member of Parliament for Rotherhithe; 1918 – 1923	Succeeded by Sir Benjamin Smith
