= James Bevan Bowen (RAF officer) =

James Bevan Bowen CBE JP (20 March 1883 – 12 August 1969) was a Welsh Royal Air Force officer who served during both World Wars, reaching the rank of Air Commodore.

He was the son of Sir George Bevan Bowen. He was educated at Winchester College, and Trinity College, Cambridge.

He was commissioned into the Pembrokeshire Yeomanry in 1910, and was attached to the Royal Flying Corps in 1916.

He commanded the No 1 Balloon Centre, at RAF Kidbrooke, 1937–1941, and appears to have then retired.

He was Deputy Lieutenant of Pembrokeshire in 1932, Vice-Lieutenant in 1952 and Lord Lieutenant from 1954 to 1958.
