= 1908 Pembrokeshire by-election =

UK Parliamentary by-election

← 1906	16 July 1908	Jan. 1910 →

Candidate	Roch	Williams
Party	Liberal	Conservative
Popular vote	5,465	3,293
Percentage	62.4%	37.6%
MP before election
John Philipps
Liberal
Subsequent MP
Walter Roch
Liberal

The 1908 Pembrokeshire by-election was held on 16 July 1908. The by-election was held due to the elevation to the peerage of the incumbent Liberal MP, John Wynford Philipps. It was won by the Liberal candidate Walter Roch.

== Campaign ==
Roch had the support of the MPs W. Llewelyn Williams and W. Jones of the United Kingdom Alliance and the Free Trade League respectively. The Miners' Federation of Great Britain also strongly supported Roch. Lort Williams, the Conservative candidate, was supported by emissaries from the Tariff Reform League and the National Trade Defence Association.

A formidable group of Suffragettes (including Emmeline Pankhurst) came to Pembrokeshire to campaign against Roch, not because they disliked him, or supported Lort-Williams, but because H.H. Asquith, the Liberal Prime Minister, was immovably opposed to the enfranchisement of women.

== Result ==
1908 Pembrokeshire by-election
Party	Candidate	Votes	%	±%
Liberal	Walter Roch	5,465	62.4	−6.9
Conservative	John Lort-Williams	3,293	37.6	+6.9
Majority		2,172	24.8	−13.8
Turnout		8,758	77.3	+2.3
Registered electors		11,331		
Liberal hold		Swing	-6.9	
