= Carmarthen West and South Pembrokeshire (UK Parliament constituency) =

UK Parliament constituency (1997–2024)

Coordinates: 51.745°N 4.701°W

- Former county constituency for the House of Commons
- Boundary of Carmarthen West and South Pembrokeshire in Wales
- Preserved county: Dyfed
- Population: 77,338 (2011 census)
- Electorate: 58,994 (December 2010)
- Major settlements: Carmarthen (part), Pembroke Dock, Tenby

1997–2024
- Seats: One
- Created from: Pembroke, Carmarthen
- Replaced by: Caerfyrddin (Carmarthen), Mid and South Pembrokeshire
- Senedd: Carmarthen West and South Pembrokeshire, Mid and West Wales

Carmarthen West and South Pembrokeshire (Welsh: Gorllewin Caerfyrddin a De Sir Benfro) was a constituency of the House of Commons of the Parliament of the United Kingdom. It elected one Member of Parliament (MP) by the first past the post system of election.

The Carmarthen West and South Pembrokeshire Senedd constituency was created with the same boundaries in 1999 (as an Assembly constituency).

The constituency was abolished as part of the 2023 Periodic Review of Westminster constituencies and under the June 2023 final recommendations of the Boundary Commission for Wales. Its wards were split between Caerfyrddin (Carmarthen) and Mid and South Pembrokeshire.

== Boundaries ==
Map of boundaries 1997-2024

The constituency was created in 1997 from parts of the former marginal seats of Pembroke and Carmarthen. Main population areas in the seat include the towns of Carmarthen, Pembroke Dock, Pembroke and Tenby. Saundersfoot and Dylan Thomas' homestead of Laugharne are also within the constituency.

The constituency included the whole of 22 Carmarthenshire communities (Abernant; Bronwydd; Carmarthen; Cilymaenllwyd; Cynwyl Elfed; Eglwyscummin; Henllanfallteg; Laugharne Township; Llanboidy; Llanddowror; Llangain; Llangynin; Llangynog; Llanpumsaint; Llansteffan; Llanwinio; Meidrim; Newchurch and Merthyr; Pendine; St Clears; Trelech; Whitland), the whole of 24 Pembrokeshire communities (Amroth; Angle; Carew; Cosheston; East Williamston; Hundleton; Jeffreyston; Kilgetty/Begelly; Lampeter Velfrey; Lamphey; Llanddewi Velfrey; Llawhaden; Manorbier; Martletwy; Narberth; Pembroke; Pembroke Dock; Penally; St Florence; St Mary Out Liberty; Saundersfoot; Stackpole and Castlemartin; Templeton; and Tenby), also the eastern part of the Pembrokeshire community of Uzmaston, Boulston and Slebech.

== Profile ==
Carmarthen West and South Pembrokeshire was a marginal seat between the Labour Party and the Conservatives. The Conservatives were very strong around the more rural parts of the seat along with Pembroke, whereas Carmarthen and Pembroke Dock were more inclined to the Labour Party. Plaid Cymru was traditionally stronger in West Carmarthenshire as well as the Tenby area where several local councillors represented the party.

== Members of Parliament ==
Election	Member	Party
1997	Nick Ainger	Labour
2010	Simon Hart	Conservative
2024	Constituency abolished	

== Elections ==
=== Elections in the 1990s ===
General election 1997: Carmarthen West and South Pembrokeshire
Party	Candidate	Votes	%	±%
Labour	Nicholas Ainger	20,956	49.1	N/A
Conservative	Owen Williams	11,335	26.6	N/A
Plaid Cymru	Roy Llewellyn	5,402	12.7	N/A
Liberal Democrats	Keith Evans	3,516	8.2	N/A
Referendum	Joy Poirrier	1,432	3.4	N/A
Majority		9,621	22.5	N/A
Turnout		42,641	76.5	N/A
Registered electors		55,724		
Labour win (new seat)				

=== Elections in the 2000s ===
General election 2001: Carmarthen West and South Pembrokeshire
Party	Candidate	Votes	%	±%
Labour	Nicholas Ainger	15,349	41.6	−7.5
Conservative	Robert Wilson	10,811	29.3	+2.7
Plaid Cymru	Llyr Gruffydd	6,893	18.7	+6.0
Liberal Democrats	William Jeremy	3,248	8.8	+0.6
UKIP	Ian Phillips	537	1.5	N/A
Direct Customer Service Party	Nicholas Turner	78	0.2	N/A
Majority		4,538	12.3	−10.2
Turnout		36,916	65.3	−11.2
Registered electors		56,518		
Labour hold		Swing	-5.1	

General election 2005: Carmarthen West and South Pembrokeshire
Party	Candidate	Votes	%	±%
Labour	Nicholas Ainger	13,953	36.9	−4.7
Conservative	David Morris	12,043	31.8	+2.5
Plaid Cymru	John Dixon	5,582	14.7	−4.0
Liberal Democrats	John Allen	5,399	14.3	+5.5
UKIP	Josie MacDonald	545	1.4	−0.1
Legalise Cannabis	Alexander Daszak	237	0.6	N/A
Independent	Nick Turner	104	0.3	N/A
Majority		1,910	5.1	−7.2
Turnout		37,863	67.3	+2.0
Registered electors		56,245		
Labour hold		Swing	−3.6	

=== Elections in the 2010s ===
General election 2010: Carmarthen West and South Pembrokeshire
Party	Candidate	Votes	%	±%
Conservative	Simon Hart	16,649	41.1	+9.8
Labour	Nicholas Ainger	13,226	32.7	−4.2
Liberal Democrats	John Gossage	4,890	12.1	−2.1
Plaid Cymru	John Dixon	4,232	10.4	−4.3
UKIP	Raymond Clarke	1,146	2.8	+1.4
Independent	Henry Langen	364	0.9	N/A
Majority		3,423	8.4	N/A
Turnout		40,507	70.4	+3.1
Registered electors		58,108		
Conservative gain from Labour		Swing	+6.9	

General election 2015: Carmarthen West and South Pembrokeshire
Party	Candidate	Votes	%	±%
Conservative	Simon Hart	17,626	43.7	+2.6
Labour	Delyth Evans	11,572	28.7	−4.0
UKIP	John Atkinson	4,698	11.6	+8.8
Plaid Cymru	Elwyn Williams	4,201	10.4	±0.0
Green	Gary Tapley	1,290	3.2	N/A
Liberal Democrats	Selwyn Runnett	963	2.4	−9.7
Majority		6,054	15.0	+6.6
Turnout		40,350	69.8	−0.6
Registered electors		57,755		
Conservative hold		Swing	+3.3	

General election 2017: Carmarthen West and South Pembrokeshire
Party	Candidate	Votes	%	±%
Conservative	Simon Hart	19,771	46.8	+3.1
Labour	Marc Tierney	16,661	39.5	+10.8
Plaid Cymru	Abi Thomas	3,933	9.3	−1.1
Liberal Democrats	Alistair Cameron	956	2.3	−0.1
UKIP	Phil Edwards	905	2.1	−9.5
Rejected ballots		65		
Majority		3,110	7.3	−7.7
Turnout		42,226	72.1	+2.3
Registered electors		58,563		
Conservative hold		Swing	-3.8	

Of the 65 rejected ballots:

- 44 were either unmarked or it was uncertain who the vote was for.
- 14 voted for more than one candidate.
- 7 had writing or a mark by which the voter could be identified.

General election 2019: Carmarthen West and South Pembrokeshire
Party	Candidate	Votes	%	±%
Conservative	Simon Hart	22,183	52.7	+5.9
Labour	Marc Tierney	14,438	34.3	−5.2
Plaid Cymru	Rhys Thomas	3,633	8.6	−0.7
Liberal Democrats	Alistair Cameron	1,860	4.4	+2.1
Rejected ballots		146		
Majority		7,745	18.4	+11.1
Turnout		42,114	71.8	−0.3
Registered electors		58,629		
Conservative hold		Swing	+5.5	

Of the 146 rejected ballots:

- 110 were either unmarked or it was uncertain who the vote was for.
- 35 voted for more than one candidate.
- 1 had writing or a mark by which the voter could be identified.

== See also ==
- Carmarthen West and South Pembrokeshire (Senedd constituency)
- List of parliamentary constituencies in Dyfed
- List of parliamentary constituencies in Wales
