= Arnold Butler =

16th-century Welsh politician

Arnold Butler (by 1521 – 17 May 1564), of Johnston, Pembrokeshire, was a Welsh politician.

He was a member (MP) of the parliament of England for Pembrokeshire in April 1554 and November 1554.
