= Alan George Weall Coulthard =

His Honour Alan George Weall Coulthard (20 January 1924 – 25 June 1988), was a British judge, broadcaster, writer and Liberal Party politician.

== Background ==
Coulthard was a son of George Robert Coulthard and Cicely Eva Minns. His older brother was Air Vice-Marshal Colin Weal Coulthard. He was educated at Watford Grammar School. In 1948 he married Jacqueline Anna James. They had two sons and two daughters.

== Professional career ==
Coulthard was a pilot in the RAF from 1941–46 with the rank of Flight-Lieutenant. After the war he was a 1st Officer with BOAC from 1946–48 and a Pilot and Staff Officer in the RAF from 1948–58. In 1959 he changed to a career in law. He was Called to Bar by the Inner Temple and practised at Swansea from 1959–81. In 1970 he was made an Assistant Recorder and in 1972 he became a Recorder of the Crown Court. He served as Hon. Recorder of the Borough of Llanelli from 1975-81. He was Chairman of the Medical Appeals Tribunal for Wales from 1976–81. In 1981 he became a Circuit Judge.

== Political career ==
Coulthard was active in the Liberal Party as Chairman of Swansea Liberal Association. He was Secretary of the Association of Liberal Lawyers. He was Liberal candidate for the Pembrokeshire division at the 1964 General Election. Although a Liberal had been elected there as recently as 1945, no Liberal candidate had stood in the two elections since 1951. At that election, the Liberal came third with 19.9% of the poll. Coulthard's task was harder as there was now a Plaid Cymru candidate to compete for the nationalist note. He came in third with 19.1% of the poll. He did not stand for parliament again.

=== Electoral record ===
General Election 1964: Pembrokeshire
Party	Candidate	Votes	%	±%
Labour	Desmond Louis Donnelly	23,926	47.23	
Conservative	Henry Graham Partridge	15,340	30.28	
Liberal	Alan George Weall Coulthard	9,679	19.11	n/a
Plaid Cymru	Dyfrig Thomas	1,717	3.39	
Majority		8,586	16.95	
Turnout			81.46	
Labour hold		Swing		

== Other activities ==
From 1960 Coulthard made BBC sound and TV broadcasts. He was President of the Swansea Festival Patrons’ Association from 1974–80.
