= George Bevan Bowen =

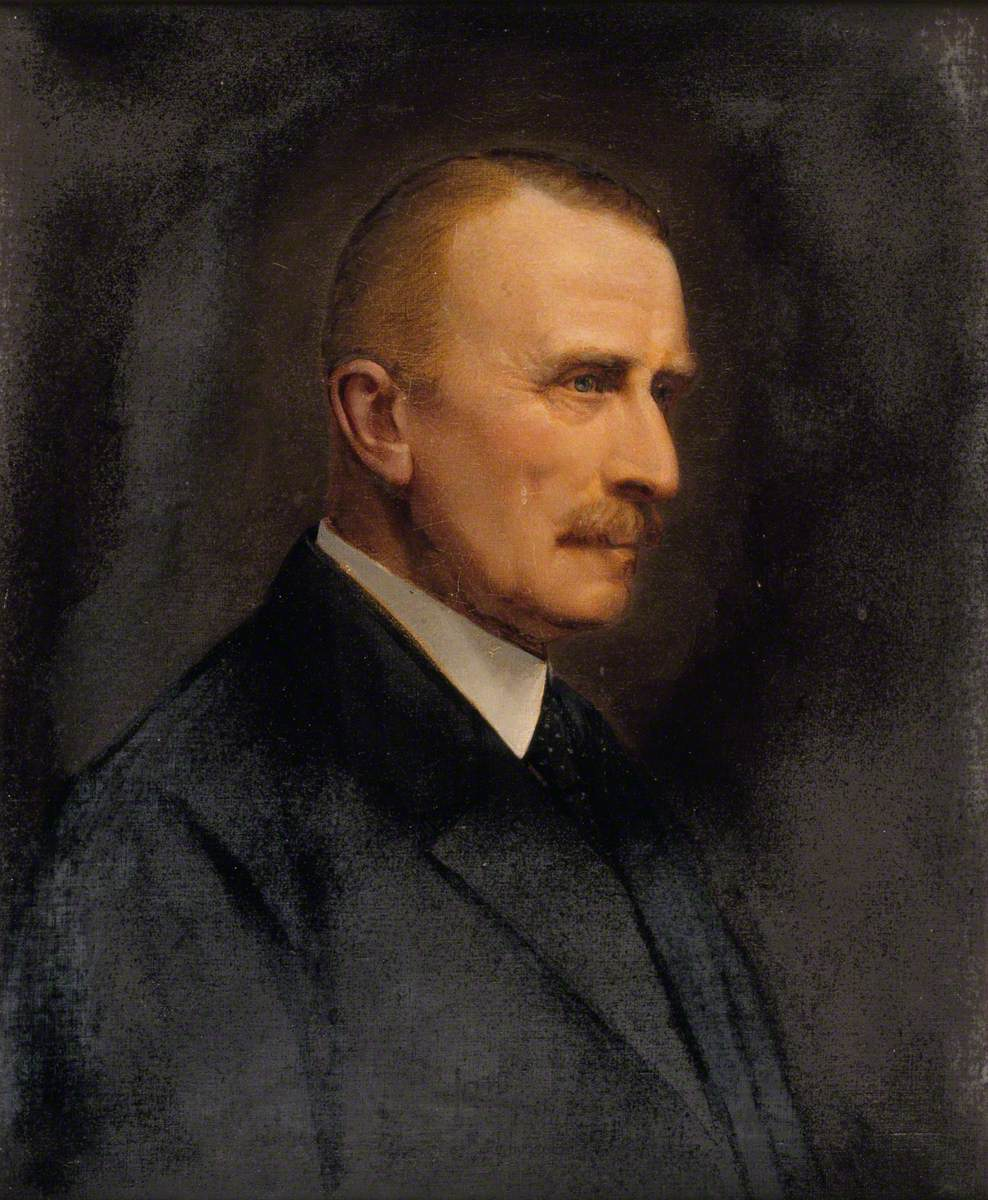
- Born: 1858
- Died: 3 July 1940 (aged 81–82)

Sir George Bevan Bowen KBE DL JP (1858 – 3 July 1940) was a Welsh Conservative landowner and county officer in Pembrokeshire.

== Early life ==
He was the son of James Bevan Bowen, a former Tory member of parliament, and was educated at Cheltenham College and Magdalen College, Oxford. He served with the Pembroke Yeomanry from 1880 to 1885.

He was Master of the Tivyside Hunt, 1893–97 and High Sheriff of Pembrokeshire in 1914.

He was appointed a Knight Commander of the Most Excellent Order of the British Empire (KBE) in the 1928 Birthday Honours.

In 1882 he married Florence, only daughter of Deputy Surgeon-General Frederick Corbyn. They had a son, James Bevan Bowen (an RAF Officer) and five daughters.

A portrait of him is held by the National Portrait Gallery.
