= Coltart =

Coltart is a surname. Notable people with the surname include:

- Andrew Coltart (born 1970), Scottish golfer and TV commentator
- David Coltart (born 1957), Zimbabwean lawyer, Christian leader, and politician
- John G. Coltart (1826–1868), Confederate officer
- Nina Coltart (1927–1997), British psychoanalyst, psychotherapist, and essayist
