= Nicholas Bennett (politician) =

British politician (born 1949)

Cllr Nicholas Bennett JP

Mayor of Bromley
- In office 8 May 2019 – 13 May 2020
- Preceded by: Cllr Kim Botting FRSA
- Succeeded by: Cllr Hannah Gray

Member of Parliament for Pembrokeshire
- In office 11 June 1987 – 16 March 1992
- Preceded by: Nicholas Edwards
- Succeeded by: Nick Ainger

Councillor for West Wickham
- Incumbent
- Assumed office 2006

Personal details
- Born: Nicholas Jerome Bennett; 7 May 1949 (age 76) Hampstead, London, England
- Party: Conservative
- Education: UCL Institute of Education

Cllr Nicholas Jerome Bennett JP (born 7 May 1949) is a British politician and a former Mayor of the London Borough of Bromley. A member of the Conservative Party, he served as a member of parliament (MP) from 1987 to 1992 representing the constituency of Pembrokeshire, and was a Parliamentary Under-Secretary of State at the Welsh Office from 1990 to 1992. In that role he had responsibility for the Welsh Health Service, Social Services, Housing and Local Government, Water and Sport.

== Career ==
Bennett was born in Hampstead, London. He was a school teacher from 1976 to 1985, and also worked for a period in educational publishing.

Bennett was a Conservative Councillor in the London Borough of Lewisham from 1974 to 1982, serving as the Leader of the Opposition in the Borough from 1979 to 1981. He was also a member of the Inner London Education Authority (ILEA) from 1978 to 1981, where he served on the Development and Schools Committees. He had previously fought St Pancras North in the GLC election in April 1973 and the Greenwich GLC by-election in October 1974.

After standing unsuccessfully for Hackney Central in 1979, Bennett was elected to parliament as the MP for Pembrokeshire at the 1987 general election. He served as member of the Select Committee on Welsh Affairs from 1987 to 1990, and the Select Committee on Procedure from 1988 to 1990, and was vice-chairman (Wales) of the Conservative Backbench Party Organisation Committee in 1990. A member of the 'No Turning Back Group' he and John Redwood were the only two MPs elected in 1987 invited to Margaret Thatcher's final lunch in 10 Downing Street. He was appointed the Parliamentary Private Secretary to the Minister of State at the Department of Transport, Roger Freeman, in 1990, before becoming a Parliamentary Under-Secretary of State at the Welsh Office from 1990 to 1992. His ministerial responsibilities included the Welsh NHS, local government and housing, adult and social care, water and sport.

On 20 June 1990 a letter bomb, addressed to Bennett at the House of Commons, described in a cabinet minute by Home Secretary David Waddington, the following day as a 'low level incendiary device' was intercepted in the House of Commons post office and disarmed by police. Similar devices were sent at the same time to the Secretary of State for Wales, David Hunt MP and Ivor Stanbrook MP for Orpington.

At the 1992 general election, Bennett was defeated by the Labour Party candidate Nick Ainger. Bennett stood as a candidate in the constituency of Reading West at the 1997 general election, but was defeated by Labour's Martin Salter.

Bennett served as a member of the Further Education Funding Council for England (FEFCE) from 1992 to 1997. He was an advisor on public affairs to Price Waterhouse from 1993 to 1998, before becoming Chief Executive of the Association of Consulting Engineers from 1998 to 2002. In 2003, he formed his own company, Kent Refurbishment Ltd, which undertook property development and education and public affairs consultancy. He wound up the company in 2019.

In 2006, 2010, 2014, 2018 and 2022 Bennett was elected as a Councillor for the West Wickham ward in the London Borough of Bromley. From 2012 to 2019, when he was elected Mayor, he was chairman of the council's Education Policy Development and Scrutiny Committee (Education Select Committee 2014–9).

He was appointed Executive Member for Transport, Highways and Road Safety in May 2022.

He was elected chairman of the council's Standards Committee in July 2021.

From 1998 until 2019 he was a local magistrate in Battersea. After the change in law allowing retired magistrates to return until their 75th birthday, he returned as a Presiding Justice and was appointed to the SE London bench in December 2022.

Bennett is the maternal great-grandson of Tom Mann (1856–1941) the noted British trade unionist and co-founder of the Independent Labour Party (UK).

He married Ruth Whitelaw in 1995. She fought local council elections in Lewisham and Reading in the 1980s and 1990s. She was elected to the London Borough of Bromley Council in 2002 and served for 16 years before retiring in 2018. She was Deputy Mayor in 2010–11.

== Education ==
Bennett was educated at Sedgehill School, before taking his O-Levels and A-Levels at further education colleges. He completed a Bachelors of Arts BA (Hons)in Philosophy at the Polytechnic of North London, a Postgraduate Certificate in Education (PGCE) at the Institute of Education, University of London, and an MA in Educational Management at the University of Sussex.

Parliament of the United Kingdom
Preceded by Nicholas Edwards	Member of Parliament for Pembroke; 1987–1992	Succeeded by Nick Ainger
