= Nicholas Edwards, Baron Crickhowell =

British politician (1934–2018)

The Right Honourable The Lord Crickhowell PC
- Edwards in 2017

Secretary of State for Wales
- In office 4 May 1979 – 13 June 1987
- Prime Minister: Margaret Thatcher
- Preceded by: John Morris
- Succeeded by: Peter Walker

Shadow Secretary of State for Wales
- In office 18 February 1975 – 4 May 1979
- Leader: Margaret Thatcher
- Succeeded by: John Morris

Member of the House of Lords
- Lord Temporal
- Life peerage 15 October 1987 – 17 March 2018

Member of Parliament for Pembrokeshire
- In office 18 June 1970 – 18 May 1987
- Preceded by: Desmond Donnelly
- Succeeded by: Nicholas Bennett

Personal details
- Born: Roger Nicholas Edwards; 25 February 1934 London, England
- Died: 17 March 2018 (aged 84) London, England
- Party: Conservative
- Spouse: Ann Healing (m. 1963)
- Children: 3
- Education: Trinity College, Cambridge

Roger Nicholas Edwards, Baron Crickhowell, PC (25 February 1934 – 17 March 2018) was a British Conservative Party politician who served as an MP from 1970 until 1987 and as Secretary of State for Wales during the first two terms of the Thatcher government.

== Early life ==
Edwards was born in 1934 in Highgate, London, to Ralph Edwards and Marjorie Ingham Brooke. He was educated at Westminster School and, after completing National Service in the Royal Welch Fusiliers, at Trinity College, Cambridge, graduating in history in 1957. He was a director of William Brandt's insurance brokers and became a member of Lloyd's in 1965.

== Political career ==
Edwards left insurance to take Desmond Donnelly's old seat of Pembroke and served as Secretary of State for Wales in Margaret Thatcher's first and second administrations.

He was adopted by the Pembrokeshire Conservative Party as parliamentary candidate for Pembroke in 1968.

At the 1970 general election, he was elected to the House of Commons as Member of Parliament for Pembrokeshire, which he represented until his retirement at the 1987 general election. From 1975 to 1979, he was Opposition Spokesman for Welsh Affairs (in other words, the Shadow Secretary of State for Wales). When Margaret Thatcher became Prime Minister in 1979, Edwards was appointed Secretary of State for Wales. He served in that position until 1987, when he was given a life peerage, being created on 15 October 1987 as Baron Crickhowell, of Pont Esgob in the Black Mountains and County of Powys.

== Later career ==
Lord Crickhowell was the sole chairman of the National Rivers Authority (NRA) from its inception in 1989 until its merger into the newly created Environment Agency in 1996. Although his was a direct political appointment from the Conservative government, Lord Crickhowell showed commitment to the principles of the NRA and the legislation that it enforced. He spoke in favour of the natural environment and supporting strong enforcement action against major corporate polluters.

During the 1990s, Lord Crickhowell became a leading figure in the campaign for a permanent home for the Welsh National Opera in Cardiff. When the plans were rejected by the Government in 1995, he launched a public attack on his former Conservative colleagues.

Lord Crickhowell sat in the House of Lords as a life peer for over 30 years from 1987 until his death in 2018, making his last appearance in September 2017. He had been associated with many British institutions, including the University of Wales, Cardiff (now Cardiff University), where he was awarded an honorary fellowship in 1984 and served as president from 1988 to 1998. He received an honorary LL.D. from the University of Glamorgan in 2001.

== Personal life and death ==
In 1963, Edwards married Ann Healing, and they had three children.

Edwards died from cancer in Battersea on 17 March 2018, at the age of 84. A memorial service was held at St Margaret's Church Westminster on 23 October 2018.

== Works ==
- (as Nicholas Edwards). The Welsh language, a commitment and challenge: the government's policy for the Welsh language (Speech). HMSO. ISBN 9780904251401. 1980
- (as Nicholas Crickhowell) (1997). Opera House Lottery: Zaha Hadid and the Cardiff Bay Project. University of Wales Press. ISBN 978-0708314425. September 1997
- (as Nicholas Crickhowell) (1999). Westminster, Wales and Water. University of Wales Press. ISBN 978-0708315224. October 1999
- (as Lord Crickhowell). The Conservative Party And Wales (PDF) (Speech). The Welsh Political Archive Annual Lecture – via The National Library of Wales. 2006
- (as Nicholas Crickhowell) (November 2009). The Rivers Join: The Story of a Family. Trafford Publishing. ISBN 978-1425191429. November 2009

Parliament of the United Kingdom
Preceded by Desmond Donnelly	Member of Parliament for Pembrokeshire; 1970–1987	Succeeded by Nicholas Bennett
Political offices
Preceded by John Morris	Secretary of State for Wales; 1979–1987	Succeeded by Peter Walker
