= John Philipps, 1st Viscount St Davids =

British Liberal politician (1860-1938)

The Right Honourable The Viscount St Davids GBE PC
- Philipps in 1905.

Lord Lieutenant of Pembrokeshire
- In office 1911–1932

Member of Parliament for Pembrokeshire
- In office 1898–1908

Member of Parliament for Mid-Lanarkshire
- In office 1888–1894

Personal details
- Born: John Wynford Philipps; 30 May 1860
- Died: 28 March 1938 (aged 77)

John Wynford Philipps, 1st Viscount St Davids (30 May 1860 – 28 March 1938) was a British Liberal politician.

== Background and education ==
Philipps was the eldest son of Reverend Sir James Erasmus Philipps, 12th Baronet, Vicar of Warminster and Prebendary of Salisbury. He was the elder brother of Ivor Philipps and Owen Philipps, 1st Baron Kylsant, both also MPs, and of Laurence Philipps, 1st Baron Milford. A fifth brother, Bertram, was the last private owner of Philipps House in Wiltshire.

Philipps was educated at Felsted School and at Keble College, Oxford, where he took a third-class honours degree in modern history in 1882. He studied law at the Middle Temple and was called to the Bar in 1886.

== Political career ==
Philipps sat as Member of Parliament (MP) for Mid Lanarkshire from 1888 to 1894.

He resigned his seat in 1894, but returned to Parliament sitting for Pembrokeshire from 1898 to 1908. Four years before he succeeded his father in the baronetcy, he was raised to the peerage as Baron St Davids, of Roch Castle in the County of Pembroke. In 1918 he was further honoured when he was made Viscount St Davids, of Lydstep Haven in the County of Pembroke. He was appointed Knight Grand Cross of the Order of the British Empire (GBE) in 1922.

=== Election results ===
1888 Mid Lanarkshire by-election Registered electors 9,143
Party	Candidate	Votes	%	±%
Liberal	John Wynford Philipps	3,847	52.1	−4.5
Conservative	William Bousfield	2,917	39.5	−4.0
Independent Labour	James Keir Hardie	617	8.4	N/A
Majority		930	12.6	−0.4
Turnout		7,381	80.7	+5.9
Liberal hold		Swing		

General election 1892: Mid Lanarkshire
Party	Candidate	Votes	%	±%
Liberal	John Wynford Philipps	4,611		
Conservative	Robert E.S. Harington-Stuart	3,489		

1898 Pembrokeshire by-election Electorate 11,061
Party	Candidate	Votes	%	±%
Liberal	John Wynford Philipps	5,070	59.9	
Conservative	Hon. Hugh Frederick Vaughan Campbell	3,400	40.1	
Majority		1,670	19.8	
Turnout		8,470	76.6	
Liberal hold		Swing		

General election 1900 Pembrokeshire Electorate 11,083
Party	Candidate	Votes	%	±%
Liberal	John Wynford Philipps	unopposed	n/a	n/a
Liberal hold		Swing	n/a	

General election 1906 Pembrokeshire Electorate 11,322
Party	Candidate	Votes	%	±%
Liberal	John Wynford Philipps	5,886	69.3	n/a
Conservative	John Rolleston Lort-Williams	2,606	30.7	n/a
Majority		3,280	38.6	n/a
Turnout		8,492	75.0	n/a
Liberal hold		Swing	n/a	

== Personal life ==
Lord St Davids was married twice. Firstly, on 14 February 1888 to Leonora Gerstenberg. They had two children:

- Capt. Hon. Colwyn Erasmus Arnold Philipps (11 December 1888 – 13 May 1915)
- Capt. Hon. Roland Erasmus Philipps (27 February 1890 – 7 July 1916)

His first wife, Leonora, died on 30 March 1915. Both their sons died during the First World War and thus predeceased their father and did not inherit his title.

Lord St Davids' second marriage was to Elizabeth Frances Abney-Hastings on 27 April 1916. They had two children:

- Jestyn Reginald Austin Plantagenet Philipps, 2nd Viscount St Davids (19 February 1917 – 10 June 1991)
- Hon. Lelgarde De Clare Elizabeth Philipps (23 September 1918 – 1984), who married, in 1950, Colin Charles Evans; they divorced in 1967.

== Arms ==
Coat of arms of John Philipps, 1st Viscount St Davids
Coronet A Coronet of a Viscount Crest A Lion as in the Arms Escutcheon Argent a Lion rampant Sable ducally gorged and chained Or langued and armed Gules Supporters Dexter: a Knight vested in chain armour the Jupon charged with the arms of Philipps and resting his exterior hand upon the Hilt of his Sword; Sinister: a Knight vested in plate armour his Jupon charged with the arms of Wogan (Or on a Chief Sable three Martlets of the field) and resting his exterior hand upon the Hilt of his Sword; both standing upon a Battlemented Wall all proper Motto Ducit Amor Patriae ("Patriotism Is My Motive")

Parliament of the United Kingdom
Preceded by Stephen Mason	Member of Parliament for Mid Lanarkshire; 1888–1894	Succeeded by James Caldwell
Preceded by William Rees-Davies	Member of Parliament for Pembrokeshire; 1898–1908	Succeeded by Walter Francis Roch
Honorary titles
Preceded by The Earl Cawdor	Lord Lieutenant of Pembrokeshire; 1911–1932	Succeeded by Sir Evan Davies Jones, Bt
Peerage of the United Kingdom
New creation	Viscount St Davids; 1918–1938	Succeeded by Jestyn Philipps
New creation	Baron St Davids; 1908–1938	Succeeded by Jestyn Philipps
Baronetage of the United Kingdom
Preceded by James Philipps	Baronet (of Picton Castle); 1912–1938	Succeeded by Jestyn Philipps
