= Gwilym Lloyd George =

Welsh politician (1894–1967)

Major The Right Honourable The Viscount Tenby TD PC
- Lloyd George in 1922

Home Secretary Minister of Welsh Affairs
- In office 19 October 1954 – 14 January 1957
- Prime Minister: Winston Churchill; Anthony Eden
- Preceded by: Sir David Maxwell Fyfe
- Succeeded by: Rab Butler (Home Office); Henry Brooke (Welsh Affairs)

Minister of Food
- In office 31 October 1951 – 18 October 1954
- Prime Minister: Winston Churchill
- Preceded by: Maurice Webb
- Succeeded by: Derick Heathcoat-Amory

Minister of Fuel and Power
- In office 3 June 1942 – 26 July 1945
- Prime Minister: Winston Churchill
- Preceded by: Office established
- Succeeded by: Manny Shinwell

Parliamentary Secretary to the Ministry of Food
- In office 22 October 1940 – 3 June 1942
- Prime Minister: Winston Churchill
- Preceded by: Robert Boothby
- Succeeded by: William Mabane

Parliamentary Secretary to the Board of Trade
- In office 6 September 1939 – 8 February 1941
- Prime Minister: Neville Chamberlain; Winston Churchill
- Preceded by: Ronald Cross
- Succeeded by: Charles Waterhouse
- In office 3 September 1931 – 27 October 1931
- Prime Minister: Ramsay MacDonald
- Preceded by: Walter Smith
- Succeeded by: Leslie Hore-Belisha

Member of the House of Lords Lord Temporal
- In office 27 February 1957 – 14 February 1967 as a hereditary peer
- Preceded by: Peerage created
- Succeeded by: The 2nd Viscount Tenby

Member of Parliament for Newcastle upon Tyne North
- In office 25 October 1951 – 14 January 1957
- Preceded by: Cuthbert Headlam
- Succeeded by: William Elliott

Member of Parliament for Pembrokeshire
- In office 30 May 1929 – 23 February 1950
- Preceded by: Charles Price
- Succeeded by: Desmond Donnelly
- In office 15 November 1922 – 29 October 1924
- Preceded by: Sir Evan Davies Jones
- Succeeded by: Charles Price

Personal details
- Born: Gwilym Lloyd George; 4 December 1894 Criccieth, Wales
- Died: 14 February 1967 (aged 72)
- Party: Liberal; National Liberal
- Spouse: Edna Gwenfrom Jones (m. 1921)
- Children: David Lloyd George, 2nd Viscount Tenby; William Lloyd George, 3rd Viscount Tenby
- Parents: David Lloyd George; Margaret Owen
- Education: Jesus College, Cambridge

Gwilym Lloyd George, 1st Viscount Tenby, TD, PC, later hyphenated Lloyd-George (4 December 1894 – 14 February 1967), was a Welsh politician and cabinet minister. The younger son of David Lloyd George, he served as Home Secretary from 1954 to 1957.

== Background, education and military service ==
Born in Criccieth in North Wales, Lloyd George was the second son of Liberal Prime Minister David Lloyd George and his first wife, Margaret, daughter of Richard Owen. His sister Megan was also active in politics, but the two moved in opposite political directions: Gwilym to the right, towards the Conservatives, and Megan to the left, eventually joining the Labour Party.

He was educated at Eastbourne College and Jesus College, Cambridge. Shortly after the outbreak of World War I he and his elder brother Richard were commissioned as Temporary Second lieutenants into the 6th (Caernarvonshire and Anglesey) Battalion, Royal Welch Fusiliers of the Territorial Force, soon transferring to the 15th (Service) Battalion, Royal Welsh Fusiliers (1st London Welsh) of 'Kitchener's Army'. In 1915 he became aide-de-camp to Major-General Ivor Philipps, commander of the 38th (Welsh) Division. He transferred to the Anti-Aircraft branch of the Royal Garrison Artillery in 1916 and rose to the rank of major, being known for most of his political career as Major Lloyd George. He was also mentioned in despatches.

== Early political career 1922–45 ==
Leaving the army in 1918, Lloyd George found employment working with his father in the post war coalition government. This also included being a trustee for David Lloyd George's National Liberal Political Fund.

Lloyd George was Member of Parliament (MP) for Pembrokeshire from 1922 to 1924, and again from 1929 to 1950. He was initially elected as a National Liberal, but then joined the re-united Liberal Party in 1923. In 1931, Lloyd George initially took ministerial office as Parliamentary Secretary to the Board of Trade in the National Government of Ramsay Macdonald, but resigned when his father David Lloyd George withdrew his support from the government. Gwilym Lloyd George was subsequently a member of the Independent Liberal group from 1931 to 1935, who were opposed to the continuation of the National Government. This group then subsequently returned to the main Liberal Party following the 1935 general election.

In 1939, Lloyd George joined Neville Chamberlain's government for the same post he resigned from in 1931. From then on Lloyd George operated in effect as an independent Liberal. In 1941, he was appointed to the office of Parliamentary Secretary to the Ministry of Food and then Minister of Fuel and Power in 1942. Lloyd George stayed in the post until the 1945 general election It was after the death of his father in 1945 that Gwilym began hyphenating his surname as Lloyd-George.

== Later political career, 1945 onward ==
Following the 1945 general election in which he stood as a 'Liberal and Conservative', and was returned by a majority of 168, Lloyd George was approached by the Liberal Party and its rival the Liberal National Party to chair their respective political organisations. Lloyd George turned them both down. Winston Churchill offered him a position in the Conservative Party's Shadow cabinet but was allowed to remain as a 'Liberal'. In 1946 Lloyd-George formally lost the Liberal Party whip.

From this point onwards he did not associate with his erstwhile Liberal colleagues (who included his sister Lady Megan) and he was openly supported by Conservatives in his constituency. In early January 1950 he was publicly disowned by the Liberal Party for supporting Conservative candidates in constituencies contested by a Liberal candidate.

Lloyd-George lost his seat (standing as a National Liberal and Conservative) in the 1950 general election. The Liberal Party did not field a candidate against him but this time Lloyd George lost to a Labour Party candidate Desmond Donnelly by 129 votes. His career in Welsh politics at an end, a year later Lloyd-George returned to parliament as a National Liberal for Newcastle upon Tyne North in the 1951 general election. His candidature was backed by Churchill although disgruntled Conservatives in the local party supported an independent against Lloyd George.

Returning to office, Prime Minister Winston Churchill appointed him Minister of Food 1951–1954, and Home Secretary and Minister for Welsh Affairs from 1954 until his retirement in 1957. Lloyd-George was raised to the peerage as Viscount Tenby, of Bulford in the County of Pembroke, on 12 February 1957 and took his seat in the House of Lords on 27 February.

In 1955, during his time as Home Secretary, he had refused to commute the death sentence imposed on Ruth Ellis; she was the last woman to be executed in the UK.

== Family ==
Lloyd George married Edna Gwenfron, daughter of David Jones, in 1921. They had two children: David Lloyd George, 2nd Viscount Tenby (1922–1983), and William Lloyd George, 3rd Viscount Tenby (1927–2023). He died aged 72, and was succeeded by his eldest son, David.

Lady Tenby died in 1971.

== Arms ==
Coat of arms of Gwilym Lloyd George, 1st Viscount Tenby
Crest "A demi-dragon Gules holding between the claws a portcullis Sable." Escutcheon "Azure over water barry wavy in base a bridge of one arch Proper, on a chief Argent a portcullis Sable between two daffodils stalked and leaved Proper." Supporters "Dexter, a dragon Gules, Sinister a lion Or; each gorged with a collar compony Argent and Vert, pendent from that of the dexter an escutcheon Argent charged with a martlet Sable, and from that of the sinister an escutcheon Gules charged with a port between two towers Argent." Motto Y gwir yn erbyn y byd (The truth against the world).

== Sources ==
- Jones, J. Graham (June 1993). "The Liberal Party and Wales, 1945–79" (PDF). Welsh History Review. 16 (3): 326–55.

Parliament of the United Kingdom
Preceded by Evan Jones	Member of Parliament for Pembrokeshire; 1922–1924	Succeeded by Charles Price
Preceded by Charles Price	Member of Parliament for Pembrokeshire; 1929–1950	Succeeded by Desmond Donnelly
Preceded by Sir Cuthbert Headlam	Member of Parliament for Newcastle upon Tyne North; 1951–1957	Succeeded by William Elliott
Political offices
Preceded by Robert Boothby	Parliamentary Secretary to the Ministry of Food; 1941–1942	Succeeded by William Mabane
New title Split off from Board of Trade	Minister of Fuel and Power; 1942–1945	Succeeded by Emanuel Shinwell
Preceded by Maurice Webb	Minister of Food; 1951–1954	Succeeded by Derick Heathcoat-Amory as Minister of Agriculture, Fisheries and Food
Preceded by Sir David Maxwell Fyfe	Home Secretary; 1954–1957	Succeeded by Rab Butler
Peerage of the United Kingdom
New creation	Viscount Tenby; 1957–1967	Succeeded by David Lloyd George
