= Charles Price (Welsh politician) =

Welsh politician

Sir Charles William Mackay Price (22 November 1872 – 6 July 1954) was a Welsh politician, Conservative MP for Pembrokeshire from 1924 to 1929. He defeated Gwilym Lloyd-George in the 1924 election but lost to Lloyd-George in 1929. He was knighted in 1932. He served during the First World War with the Queen's Royal Regiment, reaching rank of Major.

He served in World War I as a captain in the 7th Batt Royal West Surrey Regt and as a major in the 11th Batt Royal West Surrey Regt went to France in July 1915.

He was also deputy lieutenant of Pembrokeshire.

Parliament of the United Kingdom
Preceded by Gwilym Lloyd-George	Member of Parliament for Pembrokeshire; 1924 – 1929	Succeeded by Gwilym Lloyd-George
