= William Rees-Davies (judge) =

British politician, lawyer and judge

William Rees-Davies MP

Sir William Rees Morgan Davies (May 1863 – 14 April 1939), more commonly known as William Rees-Davies, was a British politician, lawyer and colonial judge. His last appointment was as Chief Justice of Hong Kong.

He was the father of William Rupert Rees-Davies, who was also a politician and lawyer.

== Early life ==
After attending Eton, Rees-Davies studied at Trinity Hall, Cambridge, where he graduated with a BA degree in 1885. He was called to the Bar of the Inner Temple in 1887 and joined the South Wales Circuit.

== Parliamentary service ==
He was a Liberal Member of Parliament for Pembrokeshire, from July 1892 to 1898, having succeeded his father, Sir William Davies in the seat. He was private secretary to the Chancellor of the Exchequer, Sir William Harcourt, from 1893 to 1895. He was succeeded by the Liberal politician John Philipps, 1st Viscount St Davids.

== Legal appointments ==
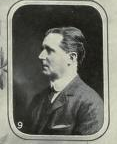
Rees-Davies in 1908, when he was Attorney General of Hong Kong

He left Parliament on being appointed Attorney General of The Bahamas. He stayed in the Bahamas until 1902 and acted as Chief Justice at times. He was appointed King's Advocate in Cyprus in June 1902, serving as such until 1907.

In 1907, he was appointed Attorney General of Hong Kong. In that position he was entitled to a seat on the Executive Council and Legislative Council. He was appointed a King's Counsel in Hong Kong in 1908.

In 1912, he was appointed Chief Justice of Hong Kong succeeding Sir Francis Piggott. He was knighted in 1913.

Rees-Davies retired as Chief Justice in 1924 and returned to England. He was succeeded by Sir Henry Gollan.

== Death ==
He died on 14 April 1939 in Folkestone, England.

Parliament of the United Kingdom
Preceded by William Davies	Member of Parliament for Pembrokeshire; 1892–1898	Succeeded by John Philipps
Legal offices
Preceded by Sir Francis Piggott	Chief Justice of Hong Kong; 1912–1924	Succeeded by Sir Henry Gollan
