= Thomas Cathern =

16th-century Welsh politician

Thomas Cathern, Gadarn or Gatharne (by 1519 – 1565 or later), of Prendergast, Pembrokeshire, was a Welsh politician.

Cathern was a member (MP) of the parliament of England for Pembrokeshire in 1558.
