= Walter Roch =

Walter Roch

Walter Francis Roch (20 January 1880 – 3 March 1965), sometime MP (Lib.) for Pembrokeshire from 1908 to 1918 was a Welsh politician and landowner, whose political career ended when he continued to support H. H. Asquith over David Lloyd George.

== Background ==
Roch was born the second son of William Francis Roch, J.P., of Butter Hill, Pembrokeshire (who died in 1889) and his wife Emily Catherine Powell (she died in 1938), the second daughter of a Welsh Liberal politician Walter R.H. Powell, of Maesgwynne, Llanboidy, Carmarthenshire, MP (Lib.) for Carmarthenshire, 1880–85, and West Carmarthenshire, 1885–89. He was educated at Twyford and Harrow Schools. He married Hon. Fflorens Mary Ursula Herbert (1879–1969), on 20 April 1911. Fflorens was a published author and Chief Commissioner for Girl Guides in Wales. Roch was also a barrister at the Middle Temple from 1913.

== 1908 Pembrokeshire by-election ==
The Pembrokeshire by-election was held on 16 July 1908. The by-election was held due to the elevation to the peerage of the incumbent Liberal MP, John Wynford Philipps. Roch was selected as the Liberal candidate. During the campaign he had the active support of the MPs W. Llewelyn Williams and W. Jones of the United Kingdom Alliance and the Free Trade League respectively. The Miners' Federation of Great Britain also strongly supported Roch. His opponent, John Lort-Williams, the Conservative candidate, was supported by emissaries from the Tariff Reform League and the National Trade Defence Association. The Women's Social and Political Union, led by Emmeline Pankhurst came to Pembrokeshire to campaign against Roch, not because they disliked him, or supported Lort-Williams, but because H. H. Asquith, the Liberal Prime Minister, opposed the enfranchisement of women. In fact, Roch was a supporter of Votes for Women. Roch comfortably held the seat.

=== Result ===
1908 Pembrokeshire by-election
Party	Candidate	Votes	%	±%
Liberal	Walter Roch	5,465	62.4	−6.9
Conservative	John Lort-Williams	3,293	37.6	+6.9
Majority		2,172	24.8	−13.8
Turnout		8,758	77.3	+2.3
Liberal hold		Swing	-6.9	

Roch successfully contested the seat in Pembrokeshire until 1918.

== Later electoral record ==
General election January 1910: Pembrokeshire
Party	Candidate	Votes	%	±%
Liberal	Walter Roch	6,135	65.1	+2.7
Conservative	Edward Marlay Samson	3,291	34.9	−2.7
Majority		2,844	30.2	+5.4
Turnout		9,426	80.2	+2.9
Registered electors		11,750		
Liberal hold		Swing	+2.7	

General election December 1910: Pembrokeshire
Party	Candidate	Votes	%	±%
Liberal	Walter Roch	5,682	65.5	+0.4
Conservative	Edward Marlay Samson	2,989	34.5	−0.4
Majority		2,693	31.0	+0.8
Turnout		8,671	73.8	−6.4
Registered electors		11,750		
Liberal hold		Swing	+0.4	

Roch was appointed to the Dardanelles Commission in 1916. He was the author of Mr. Lloyd George and the War (1920). In 1934 he was appointed JP for Monmouthshire. He and his wife spent the last twenty-five years of his life on their estates.

Parliament of the United Kingdom
Preceded by John Philipps	Member of Parliament for Pembrokeshire; 1908–1918	Succeeded by Sir Evan Davies Jones
