= Democratic Party (UK, 1969) =

The Democratic Party, initially known as Our Party, was formed in May 1969 by Desmond Donnelly, who had been a Labour MP for Pembrokeshire, but had resigned the whip in January 1968 and been expelled by the party two months later. His Constituency Labour Party supported him and was disaffiliated from the party along with Donnelly's expulsion.

The party had an anti-socialist agenda and supported UK intervention in the Vietnam War. In some respects the party was to the right of the Conservatives, advocating the abolition of the welfare state and the return of national service and capital punishment. It fought five seats in the 1970 general election, but only Donnelly polled a significant number of votes; he came third in Pembrokeshire with 11,824 votes.

The party wound up in April 1971 when Donnelly joined the Conservative Party, without even informing the Democratic Party's membership.

== Election results ==
Constituency	Candidate	Votes	%	Position
Newcastle-under-Lyme by-election, 1969	D. Parker	1,699	3.6	4
Louth by-election, 1969	Sir G. P. M. FitzGerald	1,225	4.4	4
Newcastle-under-Lyme, 1970	Dr P. H. Boyle	1,194	2.6	4
Reading, 1970	A. Boothroyd	867	1.8	3
North Devon, 1970	B. G. Morris	175	0.4	4
Huyton, 1970	J. W. G. Sparrow	1,232	1.7	3
Pembrokeshire, 1970	D. L. Donnelly	11,824	21.5	3
