= The Pembrokeshire Herald and General Advertiser =

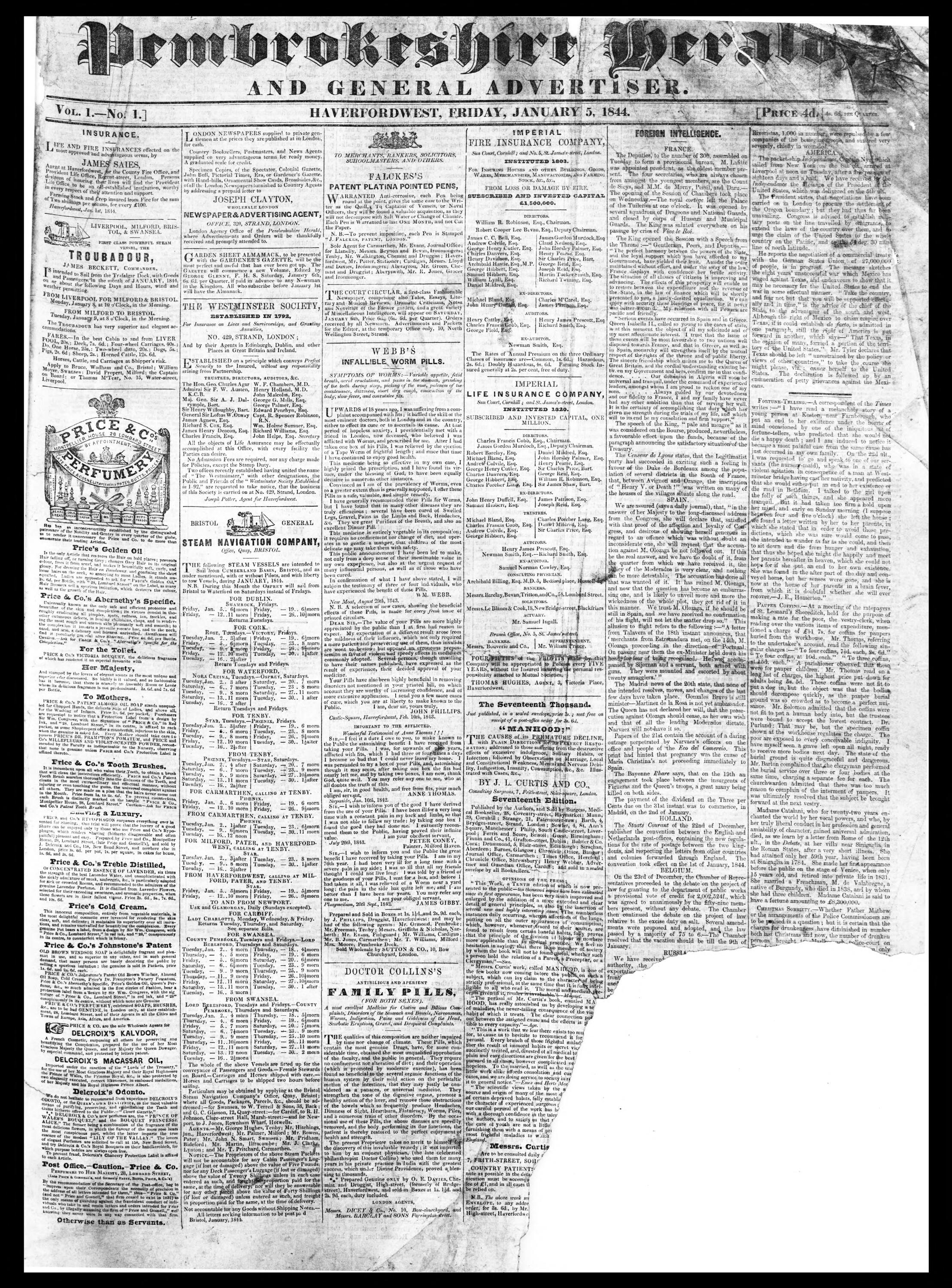
Pembrokeshire Herald Jan 5 1844

The Pembrokeshire Herald and General Advertiser was an English-language newspaper published for the communities in Pembrokeshire and Cardiganshire in Wales from 1844 to 1910. News was focused primarily on agriculture and commerce.

Welsh Newspapers Online has digitised 2,891 issues of the Pembrokeshire Herald and General Advertiser (1844–1910) from the newspaper holdings of the National Library of Wales.

In May 2013 the title was adopted for a new paper, launched by Thomas Sinclair, published every Friday.
