= Sir Evan Jones, 1st Baronet =

British politician

Sir Evan Davies Jones, 1st Baronet (18 April 1859 – 20 April 1949) was a Welsh civil engineer and politician.

The son of a sea captain, he was brought up in Fishguard and studied at the University of Bristol. He qualified as a civil engineer and was involved in the building of the Severn Tunnel and the Manchester Ship Canal. He became a partner in Topham, Jones, & Railton, a successful engineering firm that obtained many government contracts and worked on the Aswan Dam among other projects. This firm was incorporated as a limited liability company (with authorized capital of 500,000 pounds) in December 1905.

Jones served in World War I as a major in the Royal Engineers; two of his three sons were killed in the war. From 1917 he was Petrol Controller and Commissioner for Dyes under the Board of Trade, and was created a baronet in the same year. As a Coalition Liberal, he was MP for Pembrokeshire from December 1918 to October 1922. In 1918 he became Chairman of the Road Transport Board, and in 1919 he was appointed Controller of Coal Mines. In 1926 he became chairman of Pembrokeshire County Council, and was both High Sheriff (1911) and Lord Lieutenant (1932) of his native county of Pembrokeshire. He was involved in the administration of the Church in Wales, National Library of Wales and University of Wales at various times. Evan Davies Jones collected Welsh bookplates as a hobby.

== Sources ==
- Welsh Biography Online

Parliament of the United Kingdom
Preceded by Walter Francis Roch	Member of Parliament for Pembrokeshire; 1918–1922	Succeeded by Gwilym Lloyd George
Honorary titles
Preceded by The Viscount St Davids	Lord Lieutenant of Pembrokeshire; 1932–1944	Succeeded by Laurence Hugh Higgon
Baronetage of the United Kingdom
New creation	Baronet (of Pentower); 1917–1949	Succeeded by Tom Barry Jones
