= 1898 Pembrokeshire by-election =

UK parliamentary by-election in Wales

The 1898 Pembrokeshire by-election was a parliamentary by-election held for the UK House of Commons constituency of Pembrokeshire in South West Wales on 15 February 1898.

== Vacancy ==
The by-election was caused by the appointment as Attorney general of the Bahamas of the sitting Liberal MP, William Rees-Davies.

== Candidates ==
Two candidates were nominated.

The Liberal Party nominated John Philipps, a barrister. He held the seat.

The Conservative Party nominated the 4th Earl Cawdor, Hugh F V Campbell.

== Result ==
1898 Pembrokeshire by-election
Party	Candidate	Votes	%	±%
Liberal	John Philipps	5,070	59.8	+6.4
Conservative	Hugh F V Campbell	3,406	40.2	−6.4
Majority		1,664	19.6	+12.8
Turnout		8,476	76.6	±0.0
Registered electors		11,061		
Liberal hold		Swing	+6.4	
