= Simon Hart =

British politician (born 1963)

The Right Honourable The Lord Hart of Tenby PC
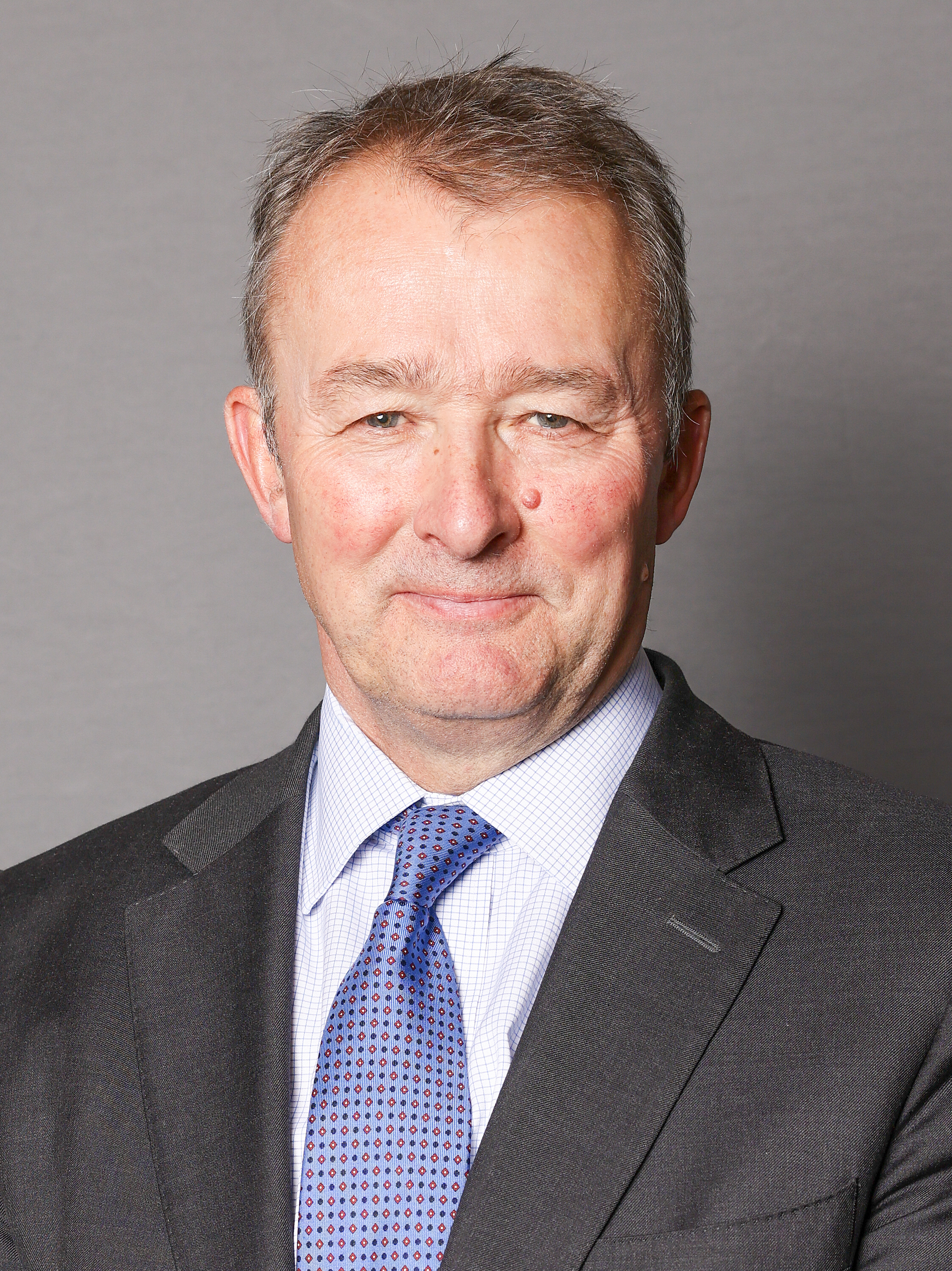
- Official portrait, 2022

Government Chief Whip in the House of Commons Parliamentary Secretary to the Treasury
- In office 25 October 2022 – 5 July 2024
- Prime Minister: Rishi Sunak
- Preceded by: Wendy Morton
- Succeeded by: Alan Campbell

Secretary of State for Wales
- In office 16 December 2019 – 6 July 2022
- Prime Minister: Boris Johnson
- Preceded by: Alun Cairns
- Succeeded by: Robert Buckland

Parliamentary Secretary for the Cabinet Office
- In office 24 July 2019 – 16 December 2019
- Prime Minister: Boris Johnson
- Preceded by: Oliver Dowden
- Succeeded by: Jeremy Quin

Member of the House of Lords
- Lord Temporal
- Life peerage 28 May 2025

Member of Parliament for Carmarthen West and South Pembrokeshire
- In office 6 May 2010 – 30 May 2024
- Preceded by: Nick Ainger
- Succeeded by: Constituency abolished

Personal details
- Born: Simon Anthony Hart; 15 August 1963 (age 63) Wolverhampton, Staffordshire, England
- Party: Conservative
- Spouse: Abigail Kate Hart
- Education: Royal Agricultural College
- Website: www.simon-hart.com

Simon Anthony Hart, Baron Hart of Tenby (born 15 August 1963) is a British Conservative politician who served as the Member of Parliament (MP) for Carmarthen West and South Pembrokeshire from 2010 to 2024. He served as the Chief Whip and Parliamentary Secretary to the Treasury from October 2022 to July 2024. He previously served as Secretary of State for Wales in the Johnson government from 2019 to 2022.

After Boris Johnson was elected as Conservative leader and appointed prime minister, Hart was appointed Parliamentary Secretary for the Cabinet Office in July 2019. In December 2019, during the formation of the second Johnson ministry, Hart was promoted to the Cabinet as Secretary of State for Wales, succeeding Alun Cairns who had resigned from the position the previous month. In July 2022, he returned to the backbenches after resigning as Welsh Secretary amid a government crisis that culminated in Johnson's resignation. In October 2022, he was appointed Chief Whip by new prime minister Rishi Sunak. His seat was abolished in the boundary changes. He stood for the new seat of Caerfyrddin in the 2024 general election, but lost.

== Early life and career ==
Simon Hart was born on 15 August 1963 in Wolverhampton and grew up in the Cotswolds. He was privately educated at Radley College before attending the Royal Agricultural College in Cirencester. He worked as a chartered surveyor in Carmarthen and Haverfordwest and served with the Territorial Army for five years in the Royal Gloucestershire Hussars (part of the Royal Wessex Yeomanry).

Hart was Master and Huntsman of the South Pembrokeshire Hunt from 1988 to 1999. He was director of the Campaign for Hunting (fox hunting) from 1999 to 2003. He was the chief executive of the Countryside Alliance from 2003 to 2010, and later its chairman from 2015 to 2019.

== Parliamentary career ==
At the 2010 general election, Hart was elected as MP for Carmarthen West and South Pembrokeshire, winning with 41.1% of the vote and a majority of 3,423.

Hart is an outspoken supporter of fox hunting and the badger cull. In January 2013, Hart said the RSPCA's legal role needs more oversight given its "political and commercial activities" in a critique of the charity's role lobbying against fox hunting. He actively campaigned in May 2013 to overturn the 2004 Hunting Bill and assist the National Farmers Union of England and Wales.

Hart was re-elected as MP for Carmathen West and South Pembrokeshire at the 2015 general election with an increased vote share of 43.7% and an increased majority of 6,054.

Despite voting Remain in the 2016 European Union referendum, Hart has consistently argued that the result must be honoured and the UK must leave the EU. He helped form and lead the Brexit Delivery Group, a group of 51 MPs who argued for a negotiated exit from the EU.

At the snap 2017 general election Hart was again re-elected, with an increased vote share of 46.8% and a decreased majority of 3,110.

In June 2017 Hart faced questions over breaches of the code of conduct and was being investigated over an alleged breach of paragraph 15. He was later cleared.

In August 2018, Hart accused actress Maxine Peake of hypocrisy, for 'taking money from the NHS for work on an advertisement, whilst attacking the Government for lack of investment in the NHS'. Peake responded that the fee came from an advertising agency and would not have gone back to the NHS if she had returned it, and she had donated the fee to The Salford Foundation Trust children's charity regardless.

On 27 July 2019, in Boris Johnson's administration, he was promoted to Parliamentary Secretary at the Cabinet Office, with responsibility for policy implementation. He replaced fellow Conservative Oliver Dowden and stood down as Chairman of the Countryside Alliance.

In the run-up to the 2019 general election, Hart shared an image of a campaign placard which had been defaced during the 2017 general election. Referencing the levels of "abuse … vitriol and intimidation" to which candidates had been subjected in 2017, Hart used a Facebook post to call for high standards of conduct among candidates, a subject on which he says he has worked to find cross-party solutions since the 2017 election.

At the 2019 general election, Hart was again re-elected, with an increased vote share of 52.7% and an increased majority of 7,745. By his own account, he was one of the last cabinet ministers to support Prime Minister Johnson during the July 2022 United Kingdom government crisis which led to Johnson's resignation.

Hart has served on the Political and Constitutional Reform Select Committee, Welsh Affairs Select Committee, Environment, Food and Rural Affairs Select Committee, Digital, Culture, Media and Sport Committee, Commons Select Committee on Standards and Commons Select Committee of Privileges.

Due to the 2023 Periodic Review of Westminster constituencies, Hart's constituency of Carmarthen West and South Pembrokeshire was abolished, and replaced with Caerfyrddin. In June 2024, Hart was selected as the Conservative candidate for Caerfyrddin at the 2024 general election.

He lost the election for the new seat of Caerfyrddin, coming third with 8,825 votes (19.4%).

=== Ministerial positions ===
Following the 2019 general election, Hart was appointed Secretary of State for Wales by Prime Minister Boris Johnson, replacing Alun Cairns.

On 22 April 2020, during the COVID-19 pandemic, he became the second minister to speak in the Commons chamber via remote video link, answering a question from Marco Longhi, the Conservative MP for Dudley North, who also spoke remotely.

On 6 July 2022, Hart resigned from government in the wake of widespread criticism of Boris Johnson's handling of the Chris Pincher scandal, following the earlier resignations of Chancellor Rishi Sunak and Health Secretary Sajid Javid.

On 25 October 2022, Hart was appointed Chief Whip of the Conservative Party by Rishi Sunak as part of his first cabinet.

=== House of Lords ===
On 11 April 2025, Hart was awarded a life peerage in Rishi Sunak's Resignation Peerages List. He was created as Baron Hart of Tenby, of Lampeter Velfrey in the County of Pembrokeshire on 28 May 2025.

== Bibliography ==
- Hart, Simon (2025). Ungovernable. The Political Diaries of a Chief Whip. Pan Macmillan. ISBN 978-1-03506-883-8.

== Personal life ==
Hart lives in Pembrokeshire with his wife Abigail. He has two adult children.

Parliament of the United Kingdom
Preceded by Nick Ainger	Member of Parliament for Carmarthen West and South Pembrokeshire; 2010–2024	Constituency abolished
Political offices
Preceded by Alun Cairns	Secretary of State for Wales; 2019–2022	Succeeded by Robert Buckland
Preceded by Wendy Morton	Government Chief Whip in the House of Commons; 2022–2024	Succeeded by Sir Alan Campbell
Preceded by Wendy Morton	Parliamentary Secretary to the Treasury; 2022–2024	Succeeded by Sir Alan Campbell
Party political offices
Preceded by Wendy Morton	Conservative Chief Whip in the House of Commons; 2022–2024	Succeeded by Stuart Andrew
