= George Lort Phillips =

British politician

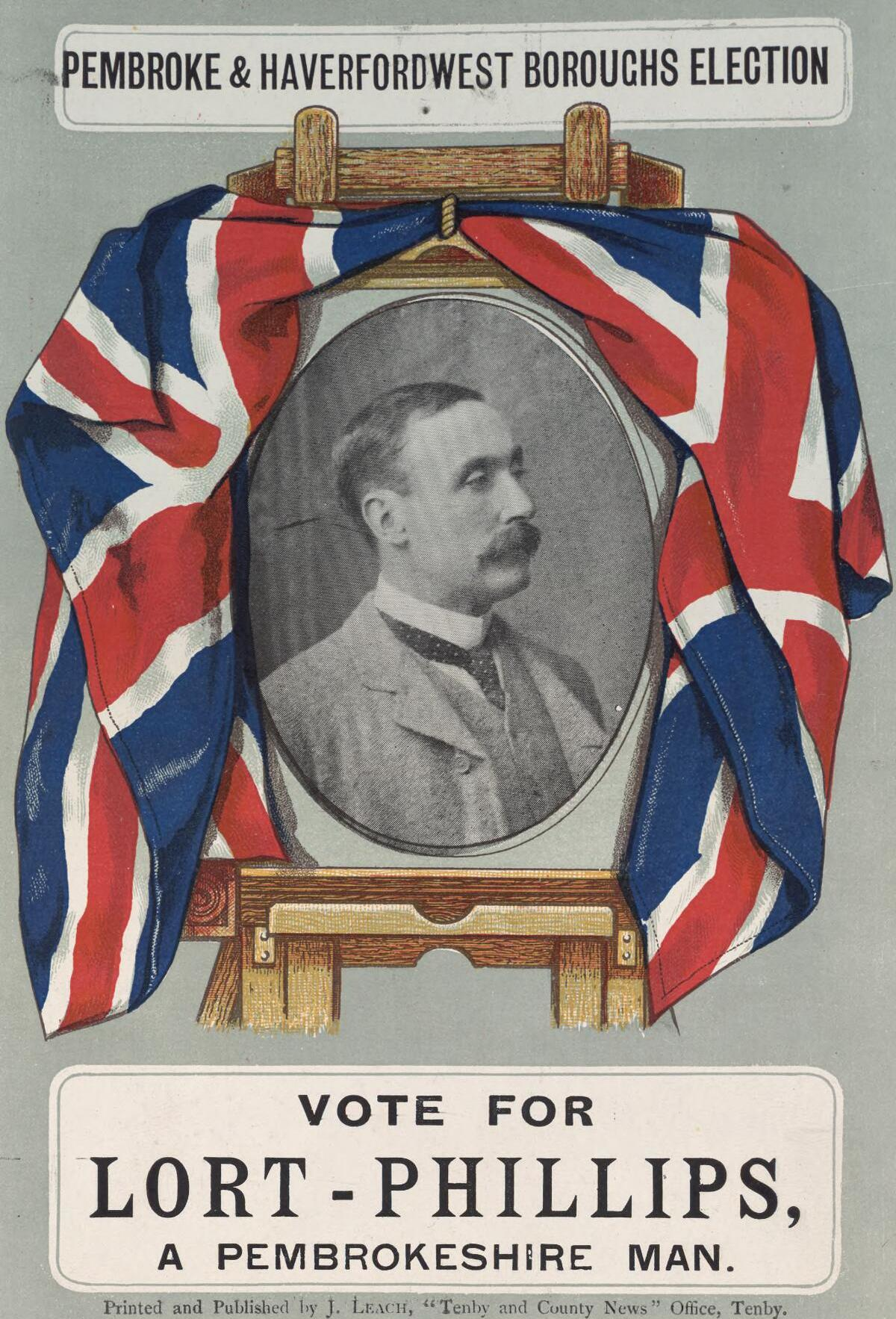
Election poster featuring George Lort Phillips

George Lort-Phillips (4 July 1811 – 30 October 1866) was Conservative Member of Parliament for Pembrokeshire in Wales from 1861 until his death.

== Biography ==
George Lort Phillips was born in Stokenham, Devon, the eldest son of John Lort Philipps by his marriage to Augusta Ilbert. He was educated at Harrow and Trinity College, Cambridge. He was a Deputy Lieutenant of Pembrokeshire from 1835. He married, in 1841, Isabella Georgina Allen, youngest daughter of John Hensleigh Allen who had been the Whig member of parliament for the borough of Pembroke from 1818 to 1826. He was High Sheriff of Pembrokeshire in 1843.

He inherited the Lawrenny, Rosemarket, and Nash estates in 1851 on the death of Sir William Owen-Barlow, 8th Baronet.

In 1861 a by-election in Pembrokeshire was called when the sitting member, John Campbell, Viscount Emlyn, succeeded his father Earl Cawdor in his earldom and seat in the House of Lords. Lort Phillips retained his seat at the 1865 general election, when he was re-elected unopposed. Throughout his time in parliament he sat on the opposition benches, with the government being led by the Liberals with Palmerston and later Russell as Prime Minister. He died in 1866 from "injuries sustained while hunting in Lawrenny Park". His funeral was attended by hundreds of people. At the subsequent by election, James Bevan Bowen was elected to the seat, the by-election unopposed by the Liberals.

Parliament of the United Kingdom
Preceded by Viscount Emlyn	Member of Parliament for Pembrokeshire; 1861–1866	Succeeded by James Bevan Bowen
