= William Davies (Pembrokeshire MP) =

Welsh politician

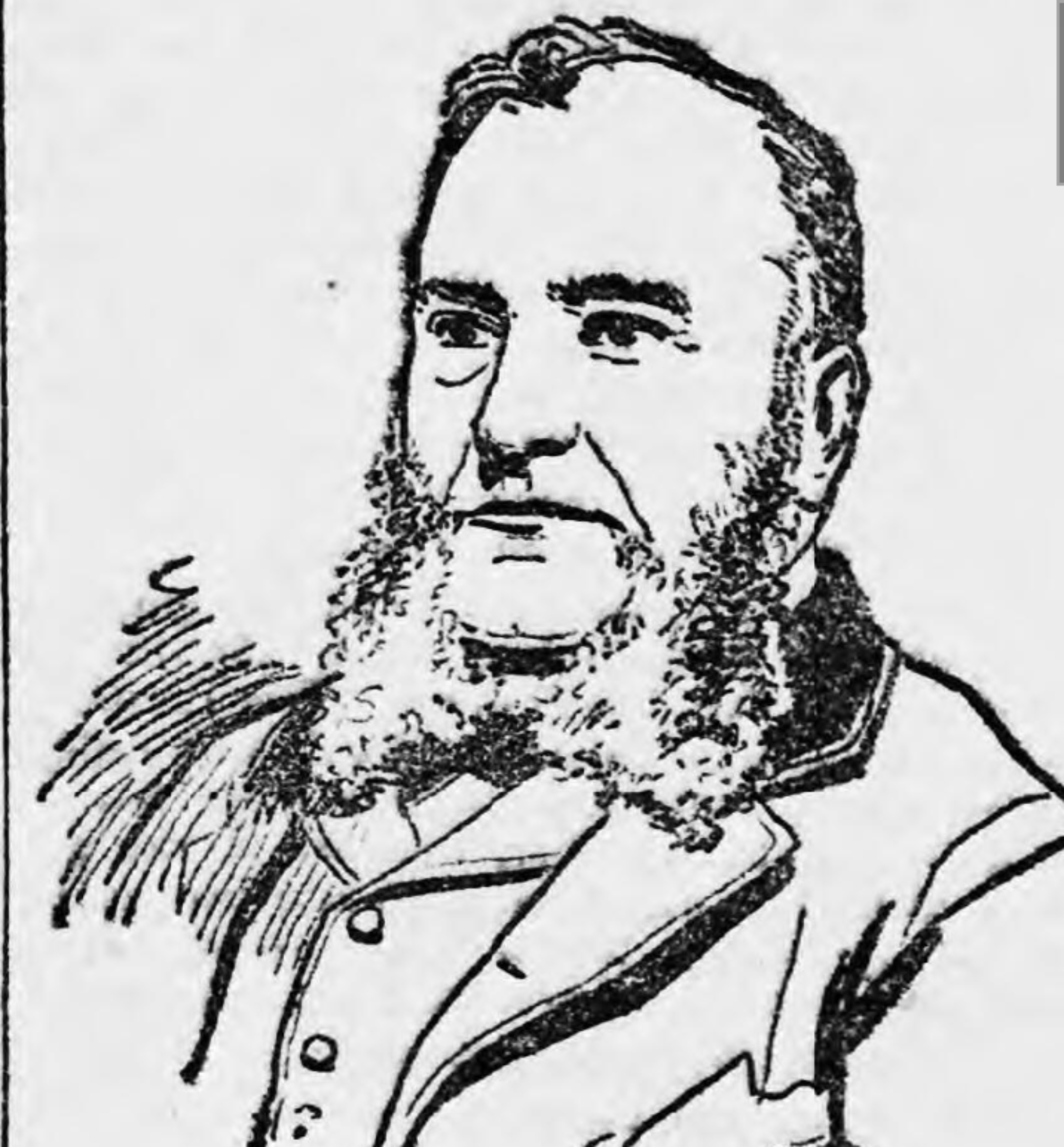
Sir William Davies MP for Pembrokeshire

Sir William Davies JP DL (1821 – 23 November 1895) was a Welsh Liberal politician.

Davies was the son of Thomas Davies of Haverfordwest. He was admitted a Solicitor in 1848 and served as a J.P. and a Deputy Lieutenant for Pembrokeshire, and a J.P. for Haverfordwest.

He stood unsuccessfully for parliament at Pembrokeshire at a by-election in 1876 but was elected Member of Parliament (MP) for the constituency at the 1880 general election. He held the seat until 1892, when his son William was elected to succeed him as MP. William senior was knighted in Queen Victoria's 1893 Birthday Honours.

Davies died at the age of 74. He had married in 1863 Martha Rees Morgan in 1859, the eldest daughter of Thomas Morgan of Haverfordwest and niece of William Rees who was High Sheriff of Pembrokeshire. She died in 1872. They had several children, including:

- Sir William Morgan Rees-Davies (1863–1939), who succeeded his father as MP and was later Chief Justice of Hong Kong.
- Colin Rees-Davies, who married at Nassau, Bahamas on 22 December 1902 Dora Septima Clark, daughter of Edward Clark, of Lapsewood, Sydenham Hill.

Following Davies's death, it was discovered that he was insolvent and his estate was declared bankrupt. Evidence of professional misconduct was also discovered.

Parliament of the United Kingdom
Preceded by James Bevan Bowen	Member of Parliament for Pembrokeshire; 1880–1892	Succeeded by William Rees-Davies
