= James Bevan Bowen (MP) =

British politician

Member of Parliament for Pembrokeshire
- In office 1866–1868
- Preceded by: George Lort Phillips
- Succeeded by: John Scourfield

Member of Parliament for Pembrokeshire
- In office 1876–1880
- Preceded by: John Scourfield
- Succeeded by: William Davies

Personal details
- Born: 1828
- Died: 14 November 1905 (aged 76–77)
- Party: Conservative Party

James Bevan Bowen (1828 – 14 November 1905) was a British politician, Conservative Member of Parliament for Pembrokeshire from 1866 to 1868 and again from 1876 to 1880.

He won a by-election in 1866, caused by the death of the sitting member George Lort Phillips, which was unopposed by the Liberals. However, he lost his candidacy for the 1868 general election in favour of John Scourfield, who had been the member for Haverfordwest since 1852, which fell to the Liberals. Scourfield died in 1876, and Bowen won his second by-election to his old seat. He lost the seat at the next general election in 1880 to the Liberal William Davies.

In 1889, he was defeated in the inaugural elections for Pembrokeshire County Council. He was subsequently made an alderman.

His son was George Bevan Bowen.

Parliament of the United Kingdom
Preceded by George Lort Phillips	Member of Parliament for Pembrokeshire; 1866–1868	Succeeded by John Scourfield
Preceded by John Scourfield	Member of Parliament for Pembrokeshire; 1876–1880	Succeeded by William Davies
