= Desmond Donnelly =

British politician

Member of Parliament for Pembrokeshire
- In office 1950–1970
- Preceded by: Gwilym Lloyd George
- Succeeded by: Nicholas Edwards

Personal details
- Born: Desmond Louis Donnelly; 16 October 1920 Sibsagar, Assam, India
- Died: 3 April 1974 (aged 53) West Drayton, England
- Cause of death: Drug-related suicide
- Party: Labour (1936–c.45; 1945–68); Common Wealth (1945); Democratic (1969–71); Conservative (1971–74)
- Other political affiliations: NILP (1946)

Military service
- Allegiance: United Kingdom
- Branch/service: Royal Air Force
- Rank: Flight Lieutenant

Desmond Louis Donnelly (16 October 1920 – 3 April 1974) was a British politician, author and journalist who was a member of four political parties during the course of his career, and moved between parties on five occasions.

== Origins ==
Donnelly, whose ancestry was Irish, was born in Sibsagar, Assam, India, where his father was a tea planter; his mother was English and descended from a member of the Indian Civil Service. In 1928 he was the first of his family to return to Britain for his schooling in a century (accompanied by his mother; they lost contact with his father); he went to Brightlands School, Newnham-on-Severn, Gloucestershire. Later he attended Bembridge School (a public school) on the Isle of Wight. He first joined the Labour Party in 1936 after becoming interested in the ideas of William Morris.

He did not go to university. As a keen sportsman, Donnelly became secretary of the London Grasshoppers Rugby Club on leaving school and while working as an office boy. At the age of 17 he set up the British Empire Cricket XI, which continued through the war years, supporting cricket, and raising funds for the Duke of Gloucester's Red Cross and the St John fund. He enlisted in the Royal Air Force in 1939 and served as a Flying Officer with Bomber Command. Later he joined the 'Desert Air Force' in the North African Campaign and Italy where he rose to the rank of Flight Lieutenant.

== On the left ==
In the 1945 general election, Donnelly fought the constituency of Evesham in Worcestershire for Common Wealth, an idealistic socialist party generally regarded as to the left of Labour. Although there was no Labour Party candidate, Donnelly was narrowly pushed into third place by the Liberal Party candidate.

Common Wealth did not long survive the election and Donnelly rejoined Labour in September 1945. From 1945 to 1946 he lectured at the RAF Staff College. On leaving the RAF, Donnelly became assistant editor and later editor of Town and Country Planning, the journal of the Town and Country Planning Association. From 1948 was that Association's Director. He contested the 1946 Down by-election as a Northern Ireland Labour Party candidate.

== Bevanite ==
Donnelly was chosen to fight Pembrokeshire for the Labour Party in the 1950 general election, which a good Labour candidate had narrowly failed to win in 1945 and where the sitting Member, Gwilym Lloyd George, was very popular, not merely because he was the son of David Lloyd George. Despite the general trend away from the Labour Party, Donnelly beat Lloyd George by playing on the fact that he was supporting the Conservatives, and won the seat by 129 votes.

In Parliament, he defined himself as "an Englishman with an Irish name sitting for a Welsh seat" and initially allied with Aneurin Bevan. He also made sure to build extensive contacts within his constituency, where he became very popular. Although his seat never became entirely safe, he was never taken to the wire. While serving as an MP, Donnelly upped his income by acting as a consultant to the engineering firms David Brown and Philips Industries and to the merchant bankers Hill Samuel.

== Gaitskellite ==
In 1954, Donnelly fell out with Bevan over the issue of German rearmament which he considered necessary. He was also outspokenly anti-Soviet Union, a position which intensified after he made trips to the Soviet bloc. After 1955, he became known as a vociferous opponent of the Campaign for Nuclear Disarmament and a general supporter of Hugh Gaitskell as Labour leader.

This ensured his appointment as political correspondent for the Daily Herald from 1959, but Gaitskell's death in 1963 brought in Harold Wilson with whom Donnelly was not pleased; although his skills would have merited appointment to Wilson's government after the 1964 election, Wilson offered Donnelly nothing.

In the mid-1960s, Donnelly decided to call for an alliance between the Labour Party and the Liberal Party. He also joined with another Labour MP, Woodrow Wyatt, to publicly oppose the Labour Party policy of nationalising the Steel industry; given the narrow majority which Wilson's government had in its first term, their opposition would have been enough to vote down the plan, and any moves had to be postponed until after the 1966 election gave a landslide majority.

== Labour rebel ==
Donnelly began causing increasing trouble to the Labour Party whips after the election. He became chief political correspondent for the News of the World in 1967 which ensured his views were widely known. He heaped scorn on the government's handling of the economy and called for a fundamental change to the relation of the party to the trade unions "in which the unions do not look on the Labour Party as their pet poodle".

The final breach in relations came after spending cuts caused by devaluation of the Pound sterling in November 1967 forced the government to withdraw from defence commitments 'east of Suez'. Donnelly resigned the Labour Party whip in the House of Commons on 18 January 1968. The Labour Party responded on 27 March by expelling him from membership of the party entirely.

== Democratic Party ==
At a meeting of the Monday Club in 1968, Donnelly received a two-minute standing ovation, and then told members "Mr Wilson should resign and leave public life". However he was not willing to join the Conservative Party and instead set up his own party, initially known as 'Our Party' but later the Democratic Party. In some respects the party's policy was to the right of the Conservatives, advocating the abolition of the welfare state, sweeping changes to the taxation system, and the return of national service. The party fought five seats at the 1970 general election but polled poorly. Donnelly himself lost Pembrokeshire to the Conservatives.

== Later career ==
Abruptly, in April 1971, Donnelly announced that he had joined the Conservative Party, without warning the members of the Democratic Party. He explained that the Conservative Party closely reflected his views on reform of the law relating to trades unions and EEC entry, and attended the Conservative Party conference that October as a delegate from Cities of London and Westminster. He applied for, but did not get, the Conservative nomination for the Hove by-election in 1973, and was also rejected for Melton for the next general election.

In addition to prolific journalism (he specialised in book reviews), Donnelly had gone into business after his defeat in 1970 and became chairman of ICPS Ltd and Managing Director of Practical Europe Ltd. In the recession of 1973 and 1974, his companies struggled financially, and this, combined with his failure to get back into the House of Commons as a Conservative, was to cause serious depression.

Donnelly committed suicide in a hotel room at West Drayton near Heathrow Airport on 3 April 1974, by drinking a large amount of vodka and taking a massive overdose of barbiturates.

== Bibliography ==
- "Mr Desmond Donnelly: An independent politician" (obituary in The Times, 5 April 1974)
- Donnelly, D. (1968) Gadarene '68', William Kimber: London. ISBN 0-7183-0071-8
- Donnelly, D. (1969) The Nearing Storm, Arrow Books: London. ISBN 0-09-001810-9
- Stenton, M. & Lees, S. (1979) Who's Who of British MPs: Volume IV, 1945-1979, Harvester: Brighton. ISBN 0-85527-335-6
- Welsh Political Archive Newsletter, Summer 1998 No 25 "Desmond Donnelly Papers" (with photograph) (The National Library of Wales) https://web.archive.org/web/20060115145319/http://www.llgc.org.uk/lc/awg_s_cylch25.htm (Last visited 31 July 2006)
- Jones, J.G. "Desmond Donnelly and the 1963 Labour Party leadership contest", Llafur, 7/3-4 (1999): 153–59.
- Layne, A. (2004) Desmond Donnelly (PhD dissertation, Miami University.
- Rodgers, Lord [William Rodgers]. "Desmond Donnelly", in Oxford Dictionary of National Biography

Parliament of the United Kingdom
Preceded by Gwilym Lloyd George	Member of Parliament for Pembrokeshire; 1950–1970	Succeeded by Nicholas Edwards
