= Pembrokeshire (UK Parliament constituency) =

UK Parliament constituency (1801–1997)

- Former county constituency for the House of Commons
- Preserved county: Dyfed
- Major settlements: Haverfordwest, Milford Haven, Pembroke Dock, Tenby

1536–1997
- Seats: One
- Replaced by: Carmarthen West & South Pembrokeshire and Preseli Pembrokeshire

Pembrokeshire (Welsh: Sir Benfro) was a parliamentary constituency based on the county of Pembrokeshire in Wales. It returned one Member of Parliament (MP) to the House of Commons of the Parliament of the United Kingdom, elected by the first past the post system.

== History ==
The Laws in Wales Act 1535 (26 Hen. 8. c. 26) provided for a single county seat in the House of Commons for each of twelve historic Welsh counties (including Pembrokeshire) and two for Monmouthshire. Using the modern year, starting on 1 January, these parliamentary constituencies were authorised in 1536. In practice, the first known Knights of the Shire from Wales (as Members of Parliament from county constituencies were known before the nineteenth century) may not have been elected until 1545.

The Act contains the following provision, which enfranchised the shire of Pembroke.

And that for this present Parliament, and all other Parliaments to be holden and kept for this Realm, one Knight shall be chosen and elected to the same Parliaments for every of the Shires of Brecknock, Radnor, Mountgomery and Denbigh, and for every other Shire within the said Country of Dominion of Wales;

=== Before the Reform Act ===
During the late eighteenth and early nineteenth century the representation of the county was subject to a series of contests between the Owen family of Orielton, who supported the Whig interest, and the Philipps family of Picton Castle.

=== The Great Reform Act to the First World War ===
During this period the seat was largely held by the Conservatives who held off the Liberal challenge which was so apparent in other parts of Wales. When Lord Emlyn inherited the title Earl of Cawdor in 1860 the seat was held until 1866 by George Lort Phillips. He was succeeded by James Bevan Bowen of Llwyngwair who stood down in favour of Sir John Scourfield in 1868. Scourfield died in 1876 and Bowen once again became the county member. In 1880, however, he was defeated by William Davies and the Liberals held the seat until 1918.

=== The Twentieth Century ===
The constituency was abolished for the 1997 general election, when its territory was divided between the new constituencies of Preseli Pembrokeshire and Carmarthen West & South Pembrokeshire. Up to 1950 it was generally considered a Liberal seat, although won by the Conservatives on some occasions. From 1950 it was regarded as a fairly safe Labour seat. However, the Conservatives won the seat in 1970 when the sitting Labour MP Desmond Donnelly left the party and formed The Democratic party. Donnelly lost the seat but polled well. In subsequent elections the Conservative vote held up, tending to suggest that Donnelly had held the seat with large majorities for Labour based on his own popularity as much as being the Labour candidate.

== Boundaries ==
The constituency was established with the boundaries of the county of Pembrokeshire, but by the time of abolition Fishguard and Northern Pembrokeshire had been joined to the neighbouring Cardigan (UK Parliament constituency) constituency to form Ceredigion and Pembroke North, which was captured by Plaid Cymru in 1992. This left Pembrokeshire with the major towns of Haverfordwest, Milford Haven, Pembroke Dock and Tenby.

== Members of Parliament ==
=== MPs 1545–1601 ===
Parliament	Member
1542	Thomas Jones
1545	John Wogan
1547	Sir Thomas Jones
1553 (Mar)	?
1553 (Oct)	Sir John Wogan
1554 (Apr)	Arnold Butler
1554 (Nov)	Arnold Butler
1555	?Richard Cornwall
1558	Thomas Cathern
1559 (Jan)	William Philipps
1562–1563	Sir John Perrot
1571	John Wogan
1572	William Philipps, died 1573, replaced 1576 by John Wogan , died 1581, replaced 1584 by Sir Thomas Perrot
1584 (Nov)	Thomas Revell
1586	Thomas Revell
1588 (Oct)	George Devereux
1593	Sir Thomas Perrot
1597 (Sep)	Sir Gelly Meyrick
1601	John Philipps

=== MPs 1601–1832 ===
Election	Member	Party
1604	Alban Stepney	
1614	Sir John Wogan	
1620	Sir John Wogan	
1624	Sir James Perrott	
1625	Sir John Wogan	
1626	Sir John Wogan	
1628	Sir John Wogan	
1640 (Apr)	Sir John Wogan	
1640 (Nov)	Sir John Wogan, died 1644 replaced by ?	
1645	Arthur Owen	
1648	?	
1653	Not represented in Barebones Parliament	
1654	Sir Erasmus Philipps, 3rd Baronet; Arthur Owen	
1656	James Philipps; John Clark	
1659	Sir Erasmus Philipps, 3rd Baronet	
1660	Arthur Owen	Whig
1678	John Owen	Whig
1679	Sir Hugh Owen, Bt	Whig
1681	William Wogan	Tory
1685	William Barlow	Tory
1689	Sir Hugh Owen, Bt	Whig
1695	Sir Arthur Owen, Bt	Whig
1705	Wirriot Owen	Whig
1710	John Barlow	Tory
1715	Sir Arthur Owen, Bt	
1727	John Campbell	
1747	Sir William Owen, Bt	
1761	Sir John Philipps, Bt	
1765	Sir Richard Philipps, Bt	
1770	Sir Hugh Owen, Bt	
1786	The Lord Milford	Whig
1812	Sir John Owen, Bt	Tory

=== MPs 1832–1997 ===
Election	Member	Party
1832	Sir John Owen	Tory
1841	Lord Emlyn	Conservative
1861 b-e	George Lort Phillips	Conservative
1866 b-e	James Bevan Bowen	Conservative
1868	Sir John Scourfield	Conservative
1876 b-e	James Bevan Bowen	Conservative
1880	William Davies	Liberal
1892	William Rees-Davies	Liberal
1898 b-e	John Philipps	Liberal
1908 b-e	Walter Roch	Liberal
1918	Sir Evan Davies Jones	Coalition Liberal
1922	Gwilym Lloyd George	National Liberal
1923	Gwilym Lloyd George	Liberal
1924	Charles Price	Unionist
1929	Gwilym Lloyd George	Liberal
1950	Desmond Donnelly	Labour
1968	Desmond Donnelly	Independent
1969	Desmond Donnelly	Democratic Party
1970	Nicholas Edwards	Conservative
1987	Nicholas Bennett	Conservative
1992	Nick Ainger	Labour
1997	constituency abolished	

== Elections ==
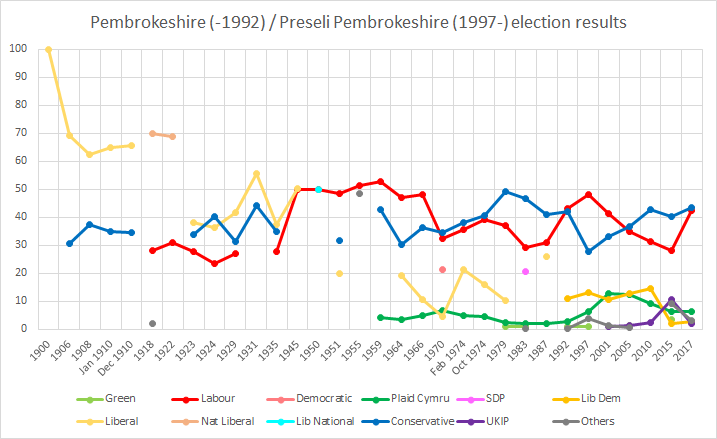
Pembrokeshire election history

=== Elections in the 1830s ===
General election 1830: Pembrokeshire
Party	Candidate	Votes	%
Tory	John Owen	Unopposed	
Registered electors		>3,000	
Tory hold			

General election 1831: Pembrokeshire
Party	Candidate	Votes	%
Tory	John Owen	1,949	51.3
Whig	Robert Fulke Greville	1,850	48.7
Majority		99	2.6
Turnout		3,799	
Registered electors		>3,000	
Tory hold			

Owen's elected was declared void on petition, causing a by-election.

By-election, 24 October 1831: Pembrokeshire
Party	Candidate	Votes	%	±%
Tory	John Owen	1,531	51.8	+0.5
Whig	Robert Fulke Greville	1,423	48.2	−0.5
Majority		108	3.6	+1.0
Turnout		2,954		
Registered electors		>3,000		
Tory hold		Swing	+0.5	

General election 1832: Pembrokeshire
Party	Candidate	Votes	%
Tory	John Owen	Unopposed	
Registered electors		3,700	
Tory hold			

General election 1835: Pembrokeshire
Party	Candidate	Votes	%
Conservative	John Owen	Unopposed	
Registered electors		3,664	
Conservative hold			

General election 1837: Pembrokeshire
Party	Candidate	Votes	%
Conservative	John Owen	Unopposed	
Registered electors		3,706	
Conservative hold			

=== Elections in the 1840s ===
General election 1841: Pembrokeshire
Party	Candidate	Votes	%	±%
Conservative	John Campbell	Unopposed		
Registered electors		3,663		
Conservative hold				

General election 1847: Pembrokeshire
Party	Candidate	Votes	%	±%
Conservative	John Campbell	Unopposed		
Registered electors		3,479		
Conservative hold				

=== Elections in the 1850s ===
General election 1852: Pembrokeshire
Party	Candidate	Votes	%	±%
Conservative	John Campbell	Unopposed		
Registered electors		3,132		
Conservative hold				

General election 1857: Pembrokeshire
Party	Candidate	Votes	%	±%
Conservative	John Campbell	Unopposed		
Registered electors		2,784		
Conservative hold				

General election 1859: Pembrokeshire
Party	Candidate	Votes	%	±%
Conservative	John Campbell	Unopposed		
Registered electors		2,700		
Conservative hold				

=== Elections in the 1860s ===
Campbell succeeded to the peerage, becoming Earl Cawdor and causing a by-election.

By-election, 19 January 1861: Pembrokeshire
Party	Candidate	Votes	%	±%
Conservative	George Lort Phillips	1,194	54.9	N/A
Liberal	Hugh Owen	979	45.1	New
Majority		215	9.8	N/A
Turnout		2,173	77.4	N/A
Registered electors		2,809		
Conservative hold				

General election 1865: Pembrokeshire
Party	Candidate	Votes	%	±%
Conservative	George Lort Phillips	Unopposed		
Registered electors		3,797		
Conservative hold				

Phillips' death caused a by-election.

By-election, 26 November 1866: Pembrokeshire
Party	Candidate	Votes	%	±%
Conservative	James Bevan Bowen	Unopposed		
Conservative hold				

General election 1868: Pembrokeshire
Party	Candidate	Votes	%	±%
Conservative	John Scourfield	Unopposed		
Registered electors		4,690		
Conservative hold				

=== Elections in the 1870s ===
General election 1874: Pembrokeshire
Party	Candidate	Votes	%	±%
Conservative	John Scourfield	Unopposed		
Registered electors		4,621		
Conservative hold				

Scourfield's death caused a by-election.

1876 Pembrokeshire by-election
Party	Candidate	Votes	%	±%
Conservative	James Bevan Bowen	1,882	53.9	N/A
Liberal	William Davies	1,608	46.1	New
Majority		274	7.8	N/A
Turnout		3,490	76.9	N/A
Registered electors		4,621		
Conservative hold		Swing	N/A	

=== Elections in the 1880s ===
General election 1880: Pembrokeshire
Party	Candidate	Votes	%	±%
Liberal	William Davies	2,185	55.7	N/A
Conservative	Charles Philipps	1,737	44.3	N/A
Majority		448	11.4	N/A
Turnout		3,922	77.6	N/A
Registered electors		5,052		
Liberal gain from Conservative		Swing	N/A	

General election 1885: Pembrokeshire
Party	Candidate	Votes	%	±%
Liberal	William Davies	4,999	57.2	+1.5
Conservative	Charles Philipps	3,738	42.8	−1.5
Majority		1,261	14.4	+3.0
Turnout		8,737	80.3	+2.7
Registered electors		10,883		
Liberal hold		Swing	+1.5	

General election 1886: Pembrokeshire
Party	Candidate	Votes	%	±%
Liberal	William Davies	4,099	50.7	−6.5
Conservative	Charles Philipps	3,983	49.3	+6.5
Majority		116	1.4	−13.0
Turnout		8,082	74.3	−6.0
Registered electors		10,883		
Liberal hold		Swing	−6.5	

=== Elections in the 1890s ===
Rees Davies

General election 1892: Pembrokeshire
Party	Candidate	Votes	%	±%
Liberal	William Rees-Davies	4,800	56.5	+5.8
Conservative	Charles Philipps	3,701	43.5	−5.8
Majority		1,099	13.0	+11.6
Turnout		8,501	78.0	+3.7
Registered electors		10,895		
Liberal hold		Swing	+5.8	

General election 1895: Pembrokeshire
Party	Candidate	Votes	%	±%
Liberal	William Rees-Davies	4,550	53.4	−3.1
Conservative	Arthur Picton Saunders-Davies	3,970	46.6	+3.1
Majority		580	6.8	−6.2
Turnout		8,520	76.6	−1.4
Registered electors		11,119		
Liberal hold		Swing	−3.1	

Davies resigned after being appointed Attorney general of the Bahamas, requiring a by-election.

Wynford Philipps

1898 Pembrokeshire by-election
Party	Candidate	Votes	%	±%
Liberal	John Philipps	5,070	59.8	+6.4
Conservative	Hugh Campbell	3,406	40.2	−6.4
Majority		1,664	19.6	+12.8
Turnout		8,476	76.6	0.0
Registered electors		11,061		
Liberal hold		Swing	+6.4	

=== Elections in the 1900s ===
General election 1900: Pembrokeshire
Party	Candidate	Votes	%	±%
Liberal	John Philipps	Unopposed		
Liberal hold				

General election 1906: Pembrokeshire
Party	Candidate	Votes	%	±%
Liberal	John Philipps	5,886	69.3	N/A
Conservative	John Lort-Williams	2,606	30.7	New
Majority		3,280	38.6	N/A
Turnout		8,492	75.0	N/A
Registered electors		11,322		
Liberal hold		Swing	N/A	

Walter Roch

1908 Pembrokeshire by-election
Party	Candidate	Votes	%	±%
Liberal	Walter Roch	5,465	62.4	−6.9
Conservative	John Lort-Williams	3,293	37.6	+6.9
Majority		2,172	24.8	−13.8
Turnout		8,758	77.3	+2.3
Registered electors		11,331		
Liberal hold		Swing	−6.9	

=== Elections in the 1910s ===
General election January 1910: Pembrokeshire
Party	Candidate	Votes	%	±%
Liberal	Walter Roch	6,135	65.1	−4.2
Conservative	Edward Marlay Samson	3,291	34.9	+4.2
Majority		2,844	30.2	−8.4
Turnout		9,426	80.2	+5.2
Registered electors		11,750		
Liberal hold		Swing	−4.2	

General election December 1910: Pembrokeshire
Party	Candidate	Votes	%	±%
Liberal	Walter Roch	5,682	65.5	+0.4
Conservative	Edward Marlay Samson	2,989	34.5	−0.4
Majority		2,693	31.0	+0.8
Turnout		8,671	73.8	−6.4
Registered electors		11,750		
Liberal hold		Swing	+0.4	

General Election 1914–15:

Another General Election was required to take place before the end of 1915. The political parties had been making preparations for an election to take place and by July 1914, the following candidates had been selected;

- Liberal: Walter Roch
- Unionist: Edward Marlay Samson

General election 1918: Pembrokeshire
Party		Candidate	Votes	%	±%
C	National Liberal	Evan Davies Jones	19,200	69.8	+4.3
	Labour	Ivor Gwynne	7,712	28.0	New
	Christian Socialist	Griffith Bowen Thomas	597	2.2	New
Majority			11,488	41.8	+10.8
Turnout			27,509	64.3	−9.5
Registered electors			42,808		
	National Liberal gain from Liberal		Swing		
C indicates candidate endorsed by the coalition government.

=== Elections in the 1920s ===
G. Lloyd George

General election 1922: Pembrokeshire
Party	Candidate	Votes	%	±%
National Liberal	Gwilym Lloyd George	21,569	69.0	–0.8
Labour	William James Jenkins	9,703	31.0	+3.0
Majority		11,866	38.0	N/A
Turnout		31,272	71.7	+7.4
Registered electors		43,631		
National Liberal hold		Swing	N/A	

General election 1923: Pembrokeshire
Party	Candidate	Votes	%	±%
Liberal	Gwilym Lloyd George	13,173	38.3	−30.7
Unionist	Charles Price	11,682	34.0	New
Labour	William James Jenkins	9,511	27.7	−3.3
Majority		1,491	4.3	−33.7
Turnout		34,366	77.9	+6.2
Registered electors		44,134		
Liberal hold		Swing	−13.7	

General election 1924: Pembrokeshire
Party	Candidate	Votes	%	±%
Unionist	Charles Price	14,575	40.4	+6.4
Liberal	Gwilym Lloyd George	13,045	36.2	−2.1
Labour	William James Jenkins	8,455	23.4	−4.3
Majority		1,530	4.2	N/A
Turnout		36,075	80.2	+2.3
Registered electors		44,980		
Unionist gain from Liberal		Swing	+4.3	

General election 1929: Pembrokeshire
Party	Candidate	Votes	%	±%
Liberal	Gwilym Lloyd George	19,050	41.8	+5.6
Unionist	Charles Price	14,235	31.3	−9.1
Labour	William James Jenkins	12,235	26.9	+3.5
Majority		4,815	10.5	N/A
Turnout		45,520	83.8	+3.6
Registered electors		54,302		
Liberal gain from Unionist		Swing	+7.4	

=== Elections in the 1930s ===
General election 1931: Pembrokeshire
Party	Candidate	Votes	%	±%
Independent Liberals	Gwilym Lloyd George*	24,606	55.71	
Conservative	Charles Price	19,560	44.29	
Majority		5,046	11.42	
Turnout		44,166	79.88	
Independent Liberals hold		Swing		

- opposed to National Government.

General election 1935: Pembrokeshire
Party	Candidate	Votes	%	±%
Liberal	Gwilym Lloyd George	16,734	37.41	
Conservative	George Edmund Allison	15,660	35.01	
Labour	William James Jenkins	12,341	27.59	New
Majority		1,074	2.40	
Turnout		44,735	79.13	
Liberal hold		Swing		

=== Elections in the 1940s ===
General election 1939–40: Another general election was required to take place before the end of 1940. The political parties had been making preparations for an election to take place from 1939 and by the end of this year, the following candidates had been selected;

- Liberal: Gwilym Lloyd George
- Labour: William James Jenkins

General election 1945: Pembrokeshire
Party	Candidate	Votes	%	±%
Liberal	*Gwilym Lloyd George	22,997	50.18	
Labour	Wilfred Fienburgh	22,829	49.82	
Majority		168	0.36	
Turnout		45,826	72.29	
Liberal hold		Swing		

- Supported the National Government. The Liberal Party had left the war coalition.

=== Elections in the 1950s ===
General election 1950: Pembrokeshire
Party	Candidate	Votes	%	±%
Labour	Desmond Donnelly	25,550	50.1	+1.3
National Liberal	Gwilym Lloyd George	25,421	49.9	N/A
Majority		129	0.2	N/A
Turnout		50,971	83.2	+10.9
Labour gain from Liberal		Swing		

General election 1951: Pembrokeshire
Party	Candidate	Votes	%	±%
Labour	Desmond Donnelly	25,994	48.4	−1.7
Conservative	Frederick Farey-Jones	16,968	31.6	−18.3
Liberal	Dyfrig Hughes Pennant	10,688	19.9	New
Majority		9,026	16.8	+16.6
Turnout		53,650	86.0	+2.8
Labour hold		Swing		

General election 1955: Pembrokeshire
Party	Candidate	Votes	%	±%
Labour	Desmond Donnelly	27,002	51.5	+3.1
Independent	William L. Davies	25,410	48.5	New
Majority		1,592	3.0	−13.8
Turnout		52,412	84.0	−2.0
Labour hold		Swing		

General election 1959: Pembrokeshire
Party	Candidate	Votes	%	±%
Labour	Desmond Donnelly	27,623	52.9	+1.4
Conservative	Henry Graham Partridge	22,301	42.8	New
Plaid Cymru	Waldo Williams	2,253	4.3	New
Majority		5,322	10.1	+7.1
Turnout		52,177	83.6	−0.4
Labour hold		Swing		

=== Elections in the 1960s ===
General election 1964: Pembrokeshire
Party	Candidate	Votes	%	±%
Labour	Desmond Donnelly	23,926	47.23	−5.71
Conservative	Henry Graham Partridge	15,340	30.28	−12.44
Liberal	Alan Coulthard	9,679	19.11	New
Plaid Cymru	Dyfrig Thomas	1,717	3.39	−0.93
Majority		8,586	16.95	+6.75
Turnout		50,662	81.46	
Labour hold		Swing	+3.37	

General election 1966: Pembrokeshire
Party	Candidate	Votes	%	±%
Labour	Desmond Donnelly	23,852	48.15	+0.92
Conservative	Francis Michael Fisher	17,921	36.17	+5.89
Liberal	Owain Glyn Williams	5,308	10.71	−8.40
Plaid Cymru	Jack Sheppard	2,460	4.97	+1.58
Majority		5,931	11.98	−4.97
Turnout		49,541	79.76	−1.70
Labour hold		Swing	−2.48	

=== Elections in the 1970s ===
General election 1970: Pembrokeshire
Party	Candidate	Votes	%	±%
Conservative	Nicholas Edwards	19,120	34.73	−1.44
Labour	Gordon Parry	17,889	32.49	−14.68
Democratic Party	Desmond Donnelly	11,824	21.48	New
Plaid Cymru	Wynne Samuel	3,681	6.69	+1.73
Liberal	David Wynford Thomas	3,541	4.62	−6.09
Majority		1,231	2.24	N/A
Turnout		56,145	77.85	−1.91
Conservative gain from Labour		Swing	+6.62	

General election February 1974: Pembrokeshire
Party	Candidate	Votes	%	±%
Conservative	Nicholas Edwards	22,268	38.25	+3.52
Labour	Gordon Parry	20,789	35.71	+3.23
Liberal	Patrick Edwin Charles Jones	12,340	21.20	+16.58
Plaid Cymru	R. B. Davies	2,820	4.84	−1.85
Majority		1,479	2.54	+0.30
Turnout		58,217	81.44	+3.59
Conservative hold		Swing	+0.15	

General election October 1974: Pembrokeshire
Party	Candidate	Votes	%	±%
Conservative	Nicholas Edwards	23,190	40.47	+2.22
Labour	Gordon Parry	22,418	39.12	+3.41
Liberal	Patrick Edwin Charles Jones	9,116	15.91	−4.29
Plaid Cymru	R. B. Davies	2,580	4.50	−0.34
Majority		772	1.35	−1.19
Turnout		57,304	79.53	−1.91
Conservative hold		Swing	−0.59	

General election 1979: Pembrokeshire
Party	Candidate	Votes	%	±%
Conservative	Nicholas Edwards	30,483	49.16	+8.69
Labour	Alan Evans	23,015	37.11	−2.01
Liberal	Richard Livsey	6,249	10.08	−5.83
Plaid Cymru	R. Dawe	1,573	2.54	−1.96
Ecology	B. Kingzett	694	1.12	New
Majority		7,468	12.05	+10.70
Turnout		62,014	81.31	+1.78
Conservative hold		Swing	+5.35	

=== Elections in the 1980s ===
General election 1983: Pembrokeshire
Party	Candidate	Votes	%	±%
Conservative	Nicholas Edwards	24,860	46.88	−2.28
Labour	Alan Griffiths	15,504	29.23	−7.88
SDP	John Pullin	10,983	20.71	New
Plaid Cymru	Osi Rhys Osmond	1,073	2.02	−0.52
Ecology	David Hoffman	478	0.90	−0.22
Independent	G. S. Phillips	136	0.26	New
Majority		9,356	17.65	+5.60
Turnout		53,034	76.12	−5.19
Conservative hold		Swing	+2.80	

General election 1987: Pembrokeshire
Party	Candidate	Votes	%	±%
Conservative	Nicholas Bennett	23,314	41.0	−5.9
Labour	Bryan Rayner	17,614	31.0	+1.8
Liberal	Patrick Jones	14,832	26.1	+5.4
Plaid Cymru	Osi Rhys Osmond	1,119	1.9	−0.1
Majority		5,700	10.0	−7.7
Turnout		56,879	80.8	+2.7
Conservative hold		Swing	−3.9	

=== Elections in the 1990s ===
General election 1992: Pembrokeshire
Party	Candidate	Votes	%	±%
Labour	Nick Ainger	26,253	43.3	+12.3
Conservative	Nicholas Bennett	25,498	42.0	+1.0
Liberal Democrats	Peter Berry	6,625	10.9	−15.2
Plaid Cymru	Conrad L. Bryant	1,627	2.7	+0.8
Green	Roger W. Coghill	484	0.8	New
Anti-Federalist League	R. M. Stoddart	158	0.3	New
Majority		755	1.3	N/A
Turnout		60,645	82.9	+2.1
Labour gain from Conservative		Swing	+5.6	

== Sources ==
- The House of Commons 1509–1558, by S.T. Bindoff (Secker & Warburg 1982)
- Craig, F. W. S. (1983) [1969]. British parliamentary election results 1918–1949 (3rd ed.). Chichester: Parliamentary Research Services. ISBN 0-900178-06-X.
