= 1901 Pembrokeshire County Council election =

1901 Welsh local government election

The fifth election to Pembrokeshire County Council was held in March 1901. It was preceded by the 1898 election and followed by the 1904 election.

== Overview of the result ==
Only eleven seats were contested and, as a result, the vast majority of wards resulted in unopposed returns.

== Boundary changes ==
There were no boundary changes at this election.

== Ward results ==
=== Ambleston ===
Ambleston 1901
Party	Candidate	Votes	%	±%
Liberal	James Harries	167		
Conservative	R.H. Harries*	166		
Majority		1		
Turnout				
Liberal gain from Conservative		Swing		

=== Amroth ===
Amroth 1901
Party	Candidate	Votes	%	±%
Conservative	Sackville Herbert Owen*	179		
Liberal	D.T. Lewis	140		
Majority		39		
Turnout				
Conservative hold		Swing		

=== Begelly ===
Begelly 1901
Party	Candidate	Votes	%	±%
Liberal	Henry Seymour Allen*	Unopposed		
Liberal hold		Swing		

=== Burton ===
Burton 1901
Party	Candidate	Votes	%	±%
Conservative	Sir Owen H. P. Scourfield, Bart.*	Unopposed		
Turnout				
Conservative hold		Swing		

=== Camrose ===
Having been defeated in 1898, Canton regained his seat without opposition.

Camrose 1901
Party	Candidate	Votes	%	±%
Liberal	W.J. Canton	Unopposed		
Liberal gain from Conservative		Swing		

=== Carew ===
Carew 1901
Party	Candidate	Votes	%	±%
Conservative	F. Lort Phillips*	Unopposed		
Conservative hold		Swing		

=== Castlemartin ===
Castlemartin 1901
Party	Candidate	Votes	%	±%
Conservative	Henry Leach*	Unopposed		
Conservative hold		Swing		

=== Clydey ===
Clydey 1901
Party	Candidate	Votes	%	±%
Liberal	Lemuel Jones*	Unopposed		
Liberal hold		Swing		

=== Eglwyswrw ===
Eglwyswrw 1901
Party	Candidate	Votes	%	±%
Liberal	E. Robinson*	Unopposed		
Liberal hold		Swing		

=== Fishguard ===
Fishguard 1901
Party	Candidate	Votes	%	±%
Conservative	James Charles Yorke*	Unopposed		
Conservative hold		Swing		

=== Haverfordwest, Prendergast and Uzmaston ===
Haverfordwest, Prendergast and Uzmaston 1901
Party	Candidate	Votes	%	±%
Liberal	W.T. Davies	154		
Conservative	Marlay Samson*	137		
Majority		17		
Turnout				
Liberal gain from Conservative		Swing		

=== Haverfordwest St Martin's and St Mary's ===
W.H. George was elected by the casting vote of the Mayor.

Haverfordwest St Martin's and St Mary's 1901
Party	Candidate	Votes	%	±%
Conservative	W.H. George	256		
Liberal	John Llewellin*	256		
Majority		1		
Turnout				
Conservative gain from Liberal		Swing		

=== Haverfordwest, St Thomas and Furzy Park ===
Haverfordwest, St Thomas and Furzy Park 1901
Party	Candidate	Votes	%	±%
Conservative	Harry Philipps*	217		
Independent	W. McKenzie	35		
Majority		182		
Turnout				
Conservative hold		Swing		

=== Haverfordwest St Martin's Hamlets ===
Haverfordwest St Martin's Hamlets 1901
Party	Candidate	Votes	%	±%
Conservative	Owen H.S. Williams*	Unopposed		
Conservative hold		Swing		

=== Henry's Mote ===
Henry's Mote 1901
Party	Candidate	Votes	%	±%
Liberal	J.S. Evans	187		
Liberal	W.G. James*	93		
Majority		94		
Turnout				
Liberal hold		Swing		

=== Kilgerran ===
Kilgerran 1901
Party	Candidate	Votes	%	±%
Conservative	John V. Colby*	Unopposed		
Conservative hold		Swing		

=== Lampeter Velfrey ===
Lampeter Velfrey 1901
Party	Candidate	Votes	%	±%
Liberal	D. Humphries	Unopposed		
Liberal hold		Swing		

=== Llanfyrnach ===
Llanfyrnach 1901
Party	Candidate	Votes	%	±%
Liberal	E.H. James*	Unopposed		
Liberal hold		Swing		

=== Llangwm ===
Llangwm 1901
Party	Candidate	Votes	%	±%
Liberal Unionist	Richard Carrow*	Unopposed		
Liberal Unionist hold		Swing		

=== Llanstadwell ===
Llanstadwell 1901
Party	Candidate	Votes	%	±%
Liberal	John H. Coram*	Unopposed		
Liberal hold		Swing		

=== Llanwnda ===
Llanwnda 1901
Party	Candidate	Votes	%	±%
Liberal	Dr William Williams*	Unopposed		
Liberal hold		Swing		

=== Llawhaden ===
Llawhaden 1901
Party	Candidate	Votes	%	±%
Liberal	J.H. Evans	Unopposed		
Liberal hold		Swing		

=== Maenclochog ===
Maenclochog 1901
Party	Candidate	Votes	%	±%
Liberal	Rev William Griffiths*	Unopposed		
Liberal hold		Swing		

=== Manorbier ===
Manorbier 1901
Party	Candidate	Votes	%	±%
Conservative	W.G. Parsell	161		
Liberal	T. Llewellin	112		
Majority		49		
Turnout				
Conservative hold		Swing		

=== Mathry ===
Mathry 1901
Party	Candidate	Votes	%	±%
Liberal	T.E. Thomas*	Unopposed		
Liberal hold		Swing		

=== Milford ===
Dr Griffith had stood as a Liberal in 1892 and a Liberal Unionist in 1895.

Milford 1901
Party	Candidate	Votes	%	±%
Liberal	Dr George Griffith*	Unopposed		
Liberal gain from Liberal Unionist		Swing		

=== Monkton ===
Monkton 1901
Party	Candidate	Votes	%	±%
Conservative	Robert George*	199		
Liberal	J. Mathias	107		
Majority		92		
Conservative hold		Swing		

=== Narberth North ===
Narberth North 1901
Party	Candidate	Votes	%	±%
Liberal	W.P. Morgan*	Unopposed		
Liberal hold		Swing		

=== Nevern ===
Nevern 1901
Party	Candidate	Votes	%	±%
Liberal	D.G. Griffiths*	Unopposed		
Liberal hold		Swing		

=== Newport ===
Newport 1901
Party	Candidate	Votes	%	±%
Liberal	Dr David Havard*	Unopposed		
Liberal hold		Swing		

=== Pembroke Ward 30 ===
Pembroke Ward 30 1901
Party	Candidate	Votes	%	±%
Liberal	Dan Davies	205		
Conservative	F.S. Reed	145		
Majority		60		
Turnout				
Liberal gain from Conservative		Swing		

=== Pembroke Ward 31 ===
Pembroke Ward 31 1901
Party	Candidate	Votes	%	±%
Conservative	Robert George*	Unopposed		
Conservative hold		Swing		

=== Pembroke Dock Ward 32 ===
Pembroke Dock Ward 32 1901
Party	Candidate	Votes	%	±%
Conservative	T. Brown*	Unopposed		
Conservative hold		Swing		

=== Pembroke Dock Ward 33 ===
Pembroke Dock Ward 33 1901
Party	Candidate	Votes	%	±%
Liberal	Samuel Bolt Sketch*	Unopposed		
Liberal hold		Swing		

=== Pembroke Dock Ward 34 ===
Pembroke Dock Ward 34 1901
Party	Candidate	Votes	%	±%
Liberal	W.D. Ivemy	189		
Conservative	W. Angel	142		
Majority		47		
Turnout				
Liberal gain from Conservative		Swing		

=== Pembroke Dock Ward 35 ===
Pembroke Dock Ward 35 1901
Party	Candidate	Votes	%	±%
Liberal Unionist	David Hughes Brown*	Unopposed		
Liberal Unionist hold		Swing		

=== Pembroke Dock Ward 36 ===
Pembroke Dock Ward 36 1901
Party	Candidate	Votes	%	±%
Conservative	S.R. Allen*	Unopposed		
Conservative hold		Swing		

=== St David's ===
St David's 1901
Party	Candidate	Votes	%	±%
Liberal	J. Howard Griffiths*	Unopposed		
Liberal hold		Swing		

=== St Dogmaels ===
St Dogmaels 1901
Party	Candidate	Votes	%	±%
Liberal	B. Rees*	Unopposed		
Liberal hold		Swing		

=== St Ishmaels ===
St Ishmaels 1901
Party	Candidate	Votes	%	±%
Liberal	James Thomas*	Unopposed		
Liberal hold		Swing		

=== St Issels ===
St Issels 1901
Party	Candidate	Votes	%	±%
Conservative	C.R. Vickerman*	Unopposed		
Conservative hold		Swing		

=== Slebech and Martletwy ===
Slebech and Martletwy 1901
Party	Candidate	Votes	%	±%
Conservative	Sir C.E.G. Philipps Bart.*	Unopposed		
Conservative hold		Swing		

=== Steynton ===
Steynton 1901
Party	Candidate	Votes	%	±%
Conservative	J.T. Fisher*	Unopposed		
Conservative hold		Swing		

=== Tenby Ward 44 ===
Tenby Ward 44 1901
Party	Candidate	Votes	%	±%
Conservative	Clement J. Williams*	Unopposed		
Conservative hold		Swing		

=== Tenby Ward 45 ===
Stokes had previously represented Manorbier

Tenby Ward 45 1901
Party	Candidate	Votes	%	±%
Conservative	C.W.R. Stokes*	173		
Liberal	C.F. Egerton Allen	145		
Majority		28		
Turnout				
Conservative hold		Swing		

=== Walwyn's Castle ===
Walwyn's Castle 1901
Party	Candidate	Votes	%	±%
Conservative	W. Howell Walters*	Unopposed		
Conservative hold		Swing		

=== Whitchurch ===
Whitchurch 1901
Party	Candidate	Votes	%	±%
Liberal	John Thomas*	Unopposed		
Liberal hold		Swing		

=== Wiston ===
Wiston 1901
Party	Candidate	Votes	%	±%
Conservative	Thomas Llewellin*	Unopposed		
Conservative hold		Swing		

== Election of aldermen ==
Aldermen were elected at the first meeting of the new council.
