= 1910 Pembrokeshire County Council election =

Local election in Wales

The eighth election to Pembrokeshire County Council was held in March 1910. It was preceded by the 1907 election and followed by the 1913 election.

== Overview of the result ==
There were comparatively few changes and the Liberals gained one seat overall in the contested elections. While there were a number of heavily contested wards, a large number of wards were uncontested.

== Boundary changes ==
There were no boundary changes at this election.

== Ward results ==
=== Ambleston ===
Ambleston 1910
Party	Candidate	Votes	%	±%
Liberal	James Harries*	196		
Conservative	Victor Higgon	163		
Majority		33		
Turnout				
Liberal hold		Swing		

=== Amroth ===
Amroth 1910
Party	Candidate	Votes	%	±%
Conservative	J.C.S. Glanville*	Unopposed		
Conservative hold		Swing		

=== Begelly ===
Begelly 1910
Party	Candidate	Votes	%	±%
Liberal	Henry Seymour Allen*	Unopposed		
Liberal hold		Swing		

=== Burton ===
Burton 1910
Party	Candidate	Votes	%	±%
Conservative	Sir Owen H. P. Scourfield, Bart.*	211		
Liberal	John Clarke	134		
Majority		77		
Turnout				
Conservative hold		Swing		

=== Camrose ===
Camrose 1910
Party	Candidate	Votes	%	±%
Conservative	A.W. Massy*	148		
Liberal	W. Roberts	95		
Majority		53		
Turnout				
Conservative hold		Swing		

=== Carew ===
Carew 1907
Party	Candidate	Votes	%	±%
Conservative	J.F. Lort Phillips*	Unopposed		
Conservative hold		Swing		

=== Castlemartin ===
Castlemartin 1907
Party	Candidate	Votes	%	±%
Conservative	Lord Cawdor	Unopposed		
Conservative hold		Swing		

=== Cilgerran ===
Cilgerran 1910
Party	Candidate	Votes	%	±%
Conservative	John Vaughan Colby*	Unopposed		
Conservative hold		Swing		

=== Clydey ===
Clydey 1910
Party	Candidate	Votes	%	±%
Liberal	Evan Thomas*	Unopposed		
Liberal hold		Swing		

=== Eglwyswrw ===
Eglwyswrw 1907
Party	Candidate	Votes	%	±%
Liberal	Edward Robinson*	Unopposed		
Liberal hold		Swing		

=== Fishguard ===
Fishguard 1910
Party	Candidate	Votes	%	±%
Liberal	Benjamin Llewhelin	316		
Conservative	James R. Richards	197		
Majority		119		
Turnout				
Liberal hold		Swing		

=== Haverfordwest, Prendergast and Uzmaston ===
Haverfordwest, Prendergast and Uzmaston 1910
Party	Candidate	Votes	%	±%
Liberal	W.T. Davies*	188		
Conservative	L.H. Thomas	98		
Majority		90		
Turnout				
Liberal hold		Swing		

=== Haverfordwest St Martin's and St Mary's ===
Haverfordwest St Martin's and St Mary's 1910
Party	Candidate	Votes	%	±%
Conservative	Hugh Saunders*	278		
Liberal	John Harries	205		
Majority		73		
Turnout				
Conservative hold		Swing		

=== Haverfordwest, St Thomas and Furzy Park ===
Haverfordwest, St Thomas and Furzy Park 1910
Party	Candidate	Votes	%	±%
Conservative	Archdeacon Hilbers*	206		
Liberal	W.F. Thomas	136		
Majority		69		
Turnout				
Conservative hold		Swing		

=== Haverfordwest St Martin's Hamlets ===
Haverfordwest St Martin's Hamlets 1910
Party	Candidate	Votes	%	±%
Conservative	W.G. Eaton Evans	111		
Liberal	T. Lewis	91		
Majority		20		
Turnout				
Conservative hold		Swing		

=== Henry's Mote ===
Henry's Mote 1910
Party	Candidate	Votes	%	±%
Liberal	Jenkin Soaram Evans*	Unopposed		
Liberal hold		Swing		

=== Lampeter Velfrey ===
Lampeter Velfrey 1910
Party	Candidate	Votes	%	±%
Liberal	Llewelyn Rees*	Unopposed		
Liberal hold		Swing		

=== Llanfyrnach ===
Llanfyrnach 1910
Party	Candidate	Votes	%	±%
Liberal	Edward Howell James**	Unopposed		
Liberal hold		Swing		

=== Llangwm ===
Llangwm 1910
Party	Candidate	Votes	%	±%
Conservative	Rev Henry Evans*	155		
Liberal	S.W. Dawkins	107		
Majority		48		
Turnout				
Conservative hold		Swing		

=== Llanstadwell ===
Llanstadwell 1910
Party	Candidate	Votes	%	±%
Liberal	Rev W. Powell*	171		
Conservative	H.E. Philipps	153		
Majority		18		
Turnout				
Liberal hold		Swing		

=== Llanwnda ===
Llanwnda 1910
Party	Candidate	Votes	%	±%
Liberal	Dr William Williams*	Unopposed		
Liberal hold		Swing		

=== Llawhaden ===
Llawhaden 1907
Party	Candidate	Votes	%	±%
Liberal	J.H. Evans*	207		
Liberal	John Morris	136		
Majority		71		
Turnout				
Liberal hold		Swing		

=== Maenclochog ===
Maenclochog 1901
Party	Candidate	Votes	%	±%
Liberal	James Henry Harries*	Unopposed		
Liberal hold		Swing		

=== Manorbier ===
Manorbier 1910
Party	Candidate	Votes	%	±%
Liberal	T. John	154		
Conservative	W.G.Parsell*	142		
Majority		12		
Turnout				
Liberal gain from Conservative		Swing		

=== Mathry ===
Mathry 1910
Party	Candidate	Votes	%	±%
Liberal	S. Lloyd Lewis*	160		
Conservative	H.M. Harries	95		
Majority		65		
Turnout				
Liberal hold		Swing		

=== Milford ===
Milford 1910
Party	Candidate	Votes	%	±%
Liberal	Dr George Griffith*	Unopposed		
Liberal hold		Swing		

=== Monkton ===
Monkton 1904
Party	Candidate	Votes	%	±%
Conservative	Colonel Mierhouse	Unopposed		
Conservative hold		Swing		

=== Narberth North ===
Narberth North 1910
Party	Candidate	Votes	%	±%
Liberal	William Palmer Morgan*	184		
Conservative	Thomas Bentley Mathias	143		
Majority		41		
Turnout				
Liberal hold		Swing		

=== Nevern ===
Nevern 1904
Party	Candidate	Votes	%	±%
Liberal	D.G. Griffiths*	Unopposed		
Liberal hold		Swing		

=== Newport ===
Newport 1904
Party	Candidate	Votes	%	±%
Liberal	Dr David Havard*	Unopposed		
Liberal hold		Swing		

=== Pembroke Ward 30, St Michael ===
Pembroke Ward 30, St Michael 1910
Party	Candidate	Votes	%	±%
Conservative	Dr A.H Style*	210		
Liberal	Daniel Davies	180		
Majority		30		
Turnout				
Conservative hold		Swing		

=== Pembroke Ward 31 ===
Pembroke Ward 31 1910
Party	Candidate	Votes	%	±%
Liberal	Benjamin Howell*	Unopposed		
Liberal hold		Swing		

=== Pembroke Dock Ward 32 ===
Pembroke Dock Ward 32 1910
Party	Candidate	Votes	%	±%
Liberal	William Grieve*	Unopposed		
Liberal hold		Swing		

=== Pembroke Dock Ward 33 ===
Pembroke Dock Ward 33 1910
Party	Candidate	Votes	%	±%
Liberal	Samuel Bolt Sketch*	Unopposed		
Liberal hold		Swing		

=== Pembroke Dock Ward 34 ===
Pembroke Dock Ward 34 1910
Party	Candidate	Votes	%	±%
Liberal	William Robinson*	Unopposed		
Liberal hold		Swing		

=== Pembroke Dock Ward 35 Lower Middle ===
Pembroke Dock Ward 35 Lower Middle 1910
Party	Candidate	Votes	%	±%
Conservative	James Hutchings*	190		
Liberal	David John	158		
Majority		32		
Turnout				
Conservative hold		Swing		

=== Pembroke Dock Ward 36 ===
Pembroke Dock Ward 36 1910
Party	Candidate	Votes	%	±%
Conservative	S.R. Allen*	Unopposed		
Conservative hold		Swing		

=== St David's ===
St David's 1907
Party	Candidate	Votes	%	±%
Liberal	John Howard Griffiths*	Unopposed		
Liberal hold		Swing		

=== St Dogmaels ===
St Dogmaels 1910
Party	Candidate	Votes	%	±%
Liberal	Benjamin Rees*	Unopposed		
Liberal hold		Swing		

=== St Ishmaels ===
St Ishmaels 1910
Party	Candidate	Votes	%	±%
Conservative	Lord Kensington**	132		
Liberal	John Bowen	94		
Majority		38		
Turnout				
Conservative gain from Liberal		Swing		

=== St Issels ===
St Issels 1910
Party	Candidate	Votes	%	±%
Liberal	William Beddoe	192		
Conservative	C.R. Vickerman*	166		
Majority		26		
Turnout				
Liberal gain from Conservative		Swing		

=== Slebech and Martletwy ===
Slebech and Martletwy 1910
Party	Candidate	Votes	%	±%
Conservative	Sir C.E.G. Philipps Bart.*	Unopposed		
Conservative hold		Swing		

=== Steynton ===
Steynton 1907
Party	Candidate	Votes	%	±%
Conservative	J.T. Fisher*	Unopposed		
Conservative hold		Swing		

=== Tenby Ward 44 ===
Tenby Ward 44 1910
Party	Candidate	Votes	%	±%
Conservative	George Chiles**	Unopposed		
Conservative hold		Swing		

=== Tenby Ward 45 ===
Tenby Ward 45 1910
Party	Candidate	Votes	%	±%
Conservative	C.W.R. Stokes*	Unopposed		
Conservative hold		Swing		

=== Walwyn's Castle ===
Walwyn's Castle 1910
Party	Candidate	Votes	%	±%
Conservative	W. Howell Walters*	Unopposed		
Conservative hold		Swing		

=== Whitchurch ===
Whitchurch 1907
Party	Candidate	Votes	%	±%
Liberal	John Thomas*	Unopposed		
Liberal hold		Swing		

=== Wiston ===
Wiston 1907
Party	Candidate	Votes	%	±%
Conservative	Thomas Llewellin*	Unopposed		
Conservative hold		Swing		

== Election of aldermen ==
Aldermen were elected at the first meeting of the new council. All were Liberals with the exception of H.E.E. Philipps.

- E.D. Jones, Fishguard (37)
- Col. Ivor Philipps (30))
- C. Young, Pembroke Dock (30)
- J. Whicher, Milford Haven (29)
- J.A. White, Haverfordwest (26)
- Dan Davies (24)
- H.E.E. Philipps, Picton Castle (20)
- T.E. Thomas, Trehale (20)
