= 1904 Pembrokeshire County Council election =

1904 Welsh local government election

The sixth election to Pembrokeshire County Council was held in March 1904. It was preceded by the 1901 election and followed by the 1907 election.

== Overview of the result ==
Only a small number of seats were contested and, as a result, 29 members were returned unopposed.

== Boundary changes ==
There were no boundary changes at this election.

== Ward results ==
=== Ambleston ===
Ambleston 1904
Party	Candidate	Votes	%	±%
Liberal	James Harries*	228		
Conservative	C. Mathias	116		
Majority		112		
Turnout				
Liberal hold		Swing		

=== Amroth ===
Amroth 1904
Party	Candidate	Votes	%	±%
Conservative	J.C.S. Glanville	154		
Liberal	Col. Ivor Philipps	139		
Majority		15		
Turnout				
Conservative hold		Swing		

=== Begelly ===
Begelly 1904
Party	Candidate	Votes	%	±%
Liberal	Henry Seymour Allen*	Unopposed		
Liberal hold		Swing		

=== Burton ===
Burton 1904
Party	Candidate	Votes	%	±%
Conservative	Sir Owen H. P. Scourfield, Bart.*	Unopposed		
Turnout				
Conservative hold		Swing		

=== Camrose ===
Camrose 1904
Party	Candidate	Votes	%	±%
Liberal	W.J. Canton*	169		
Conservative	A.W. Massy	75		
Majority		94		
Turnout				
Liberal hold		Swing		

=== Carew ===
Carew 1904
Party	Candidate	Votes	%	±%
Conservative	F. Lort Phillips*	Unopposed		
Conservative hold		Swing		

=== Castlemartin ===
Castlemartin 1904
Party	Candidate	Votes	%	±%
Conservative	Lord Cawdor	Unopposed		
Conservative hold				

=== Clydey ===
Clydey 1904
Party	Candidate	Votes	%	±%
Liberal	Evan Thomas	Unopposed		
Liberal hold		Swing		

=== Eglwyswrw ===
Eglwyswrw 1904
Party	Candidate	Votes	%	±%
Liberal	E. Robinson*	Unopposed		
Liberal hold		Swing		

=== Fishguard ===
Yorke stood as an Independent although elected as a Conservative in 1901.

Fishguard 1904
Party	Candidate	Votes	%	±%
Liberal	W.L. Williams	268		
Independent	James Charles Yorke*	139		
Majority		129		
Turnout				
Liberal gain from Conservative		Swing		

=== Haverfordwest, Prendergast and Uzmaston ===
Haverfordwest, Prendergast and Uzmaston 1904
Party	Candidate	Votes	%	±%
Liberal	W.T. Davies*	188		
Conservative	E. White	116		
Majority		72		
Turnout				
Liberal gain from Conservative		Swing		

=== Haverfordwest St Martin's and St Mary's ===
Haverfordwest St Martin's and St Mary's 1904
Party	Candidate	Votes	%	±%
Liberal	Rev. John Phillips	264		
Conservative	Hugh Saunders	230		
Majority		34		
Turnout				
Liberal gain from Conservative		Swing		

=== Haverfordwest, St Thomas and Furzy Park ===
Haverfordwest, St Thomas and Furzy Park 1904
Party	Candidate	Votes	%	±%
Liberal	Isiah Reynolds	204		
Conservative	Edward Reid	103		
Majority		101		
Turnout				
Liberal gain from Conservative		Swing		

=== Haverfordwest St Martin's Hamlets ===
Haverfordwest St Martin's Hamlets 1904
Party	Candidate	Votes	%	±%
Conservative	Owen H.S. Williams*	99		
Liberal	T. Lewis	83		
Majority		16		
Turnout				
Conservative hold		Swing		

=== Henry's Mote ===
Henry's Mote 1904
Party	Candidate	Votes	%	±%
Liberal	Jenkin Soaram Evans	Unopposed		
Liberal hold		Swing		

=== Kilgerran ===
Kilgerran 1904
Party	Candidate	Votes	%	±%
Conservative	John Vaughan Colby*	Unopposed		
Conservative hold		Swing		

=== Lampeter Velfrey ===
Lampeter Velfrey 1904
Party	Candidate	Votes	%	±%
Liberal	Ll. Rees	216		
Liberal	W. Richards	56		
Majority		160		
Turnout				
Liberal hold		Swing		

=== Llanfyrnach ===
Llanfyrnach 1904
Party	Candidate	Votes	%	±%
Liberal	E.H. James*	Unopposed		
Liberal hold		Swing		

=== Llangwm ===
The sitting Liberal Unionist did not seek re-election

Llangwm 1904
Party	Candidate	Votes	%	±%
Liberal	Rev Jenkyn Jones	183		
Conservative	G.P. George	100		
Majority		83		
Turnout				
Liberal gain from Liberal Unionist		Swing		

=== Llanstadwell ===
Llanstadwell 1904
Party	Candidate	Votes	%	±%
Liberal	Rev W. Powell	Unopposed		
Liberal hold		Swing		

=== Llanwnda ===
Llanwnda 1904
Party	Candidate	Votes	%	±%
Liberal	Dr William Williams*	Unopposed		
Liberal hold		Swing		

=== Llawhaden ===
Llawhaden 1904
Party	Candidate	Votes	%	±%
Liberal	J.H. Evans*	Unopposed		
Liberal hold		Swing		

=== Maenclochog ===
Maenclochog 1904
Party	Candidate	Votes	%	±%
Liberal	Rev William Griffiths*	Unopposed		
Liberal hold		Swing		

=== Manorbier ===
Manorbier 1904
Party	Candidate	Votes	%	±%
Liberal	T. Llewellin	145		
Conservative	W.G.Parsell*	126		
Majority		19		
Turnout				
Conservative hold		Swing		

=== Mathry ===
Mathry 1904
Party	Candidate	Votes	%	±%
Liberal	T.E. Thomas*	Unopposed		
Liberal hold		Swing		

=== Milford ===
Dr Griffith had stood as a Liberal in 1892 and a Liberal Unionist in 1895.

Milford 1904
Party	Candidate	Votes	%	±%
Liberal	Dr George Griffith*	Unopposed		
Liberal gain from Liberal Unionist		Swing		

=== Monkton ===
Monkton 1904
Party	Candidate	Votes	%	±%
Conservative	Colonel Mierhouse	Unopposed		
Conservative hold		Swing		

=== Narberth North ===
Narberth North 1904
Party	Candidate	Votes	%	±%
Liberal	W.P. Morgan*	Unopposed		
Liberal hold		Swing		

=== Nevern ===
Nevern 1904
Party	Candidate	Votes	%	±%
Liberal	D.G. Griffiths*	Unopposed		
Liberal hold		Swing		

=== Newport ===
Newport 1904
Party	Candidate	Votes	%	±%
Liberal	Dr David Havard*	Unopposed		
Liberal hold		Swing		

=== Pembroke Ward 30 ===
Pembroke Ward 30 1904
Party	Candidate	Votes	%	±%
Liberal	Dan Davies*	Unopposed		
Liberal hold		Swing		

=== Pembroke Ward 31 ===
Pembroke Ward 31 1904
Party	Candidate	Votes	%	±%
Conservative	Robert George*	Unopposed		
Conservative hold		Swing		

=== Pembroke Dock Ward 32 ===
Pembroke Dock Ward 32 1904
Party	Candidate	Votes	%	±%
Conservative	T. Brown*	Unopposed		
Conservative hold		Swing		

=== Pembroke Dock Ward 33 ===
Pembroke Dock Ward 33 1904
Party	Candidate	Votes	%	±%
Liberal	Samuel Bolt Sketch*	Unopposed		
Liberal hold		Swing		

=== Pembroke Dock Ward 34 ===
Pembroke Dock Ward 34 1904
Party	Candidate	Votes	%	±%
Liberal	W.D. Ivemy	189		
Conservative	W. Angel	142		
Majority		47		
Turnout				
Liberal gain from Conservative		Swing		

=== Pembroke Dock Ward 35 ===
Pembroke Dock Ward 35 1904
Party	Candidate	Votes	%	±%
Liberal Unionist	David Hughes Brown*	Unopposed		
Liberal Unionist hold		Swing		

=== Pembroke Dock Ward 36 ===
Pembroke Dock Ward 36 1904
Party	Candidate	Votes	%	±%
Conservative	S.R. Allen*	Unopposed		
Conservative hold		Swing		

=== St David's ===
St David's 1904
Party	Candidate	Votes	%	±%
Liberal	J. Howard Griffiths*	Unopposed		
Liberal hold		Swing		

=== St Dogmaels ===
St Dogmaels 1904
Party	Candidate	Votes	%	±%
Liberal	B. Rees*	Unopposed		
Liberal hold		Swing		

=== St Ishmaels ===
St Ishmaels 1904
Party	Candidate	Votes	%	±%
Liberal	James Thomas*	Unopposed		
Liberal hold		Swing		

=== St Issels ===
St Issels 1904
Party	Candidate	Votes	%	±%
Conservative	C.R. Vickerman*	Unopposed		
Conservative hold		Swing		

=== Slebech and Martletwy ===
Slebech and Martletwy 1904
Party	Candidate	Votes	%	±%
Conservative	Sir C.E.G. Philipps Bart.*	Unopposed		
Conservative hold		Swing		

=== Steynton ===
Steynton 1904
Party	Candidate	Votes	%	±%
Conservative	J.T. Fisher*	Unopposed		
Conservative hold		Swing		

=== Tenby Ward 44 ===
Tenby Ward 44 1904
Party	Candidate	Votes	%	±%
Conservative	Clement J. Williams*	Unopposed		
Conservative hold		Swing		

=== Tenby Ward 45 ===
Tenby Ward 45 1904
Party	Candidate	Votes	%	±%
Conservative	C.W.R. Stokes*	193		
Liberal	C.F. Egerton Allen	145		
Majority		28		
Turnout				
Conservative hold		Swing		

=== Walwyn's Castle ===
Walwyn's Castle 1904
Party	Candidate	Votes	%	±%
Conservative	W. Howell Walters*	Unopposed		
Conservative hold		Swing		

=== Whitchurch ===
Whitchurch 1904
Party	Candidate	Votes	%	±%
Liberal	John Thomas*	Unopposed		
Liberal hold		Swing		

=== Wiston ===
Wiston 1904
Party	Candidate	Votes	%	±%
Conservative	Thomas Llewellin*	Unopposed		
Conservative hold		Swing		

== Election of aldermen ==
Aldermen were elected at the first meeting of the new council.
