= 1889 Pembrokeshire County Council election =

1889 Welsh local government election

The first election to Pembrokeshire County Council, was held in January 1889. It was followed by the 1892 election. The county was divided into 38 single member wards with two councillors elected to represent Tenby and Pembroke, and five for Pembroke Dock.

== Overview of the result ==
1889 was a landmark year in the history of Welsh Liberalism, a coming of age symbolized by the triumph across Wales of Liberal candidates in the inaugural county council elections. The Liberal triumph in Pembrokeshire was not as complete as in other Welsh counties but was nevertheless significant. In the north of the county a number of landed gentry were defeated including James Bevan Bowen of Llwyngwair, former MP for the county of Pembrokeshire. There were only nine unopposed returns, most of whom were Liberals.

== Ward results ==
=== Ambleston ===
Ambleston 1889
Party	Candidate	Votes	%	±%
Liberal	David Morris	Unopposed	N/A	N/A
Liberal win (new seat)				

=== Amroth ===
Amroth 1889
Party	Candidate	Votes	%	±%
Conservative	Sackville Herbert Owen	191		
Liberal	R. Phillips	87		
Majority		104		
Turnout		277		
Conservative win (new seat)				

=== Begelly ===
Begelly 1889
Party	Candidate	Votes	%	±%
Liberal	Henry Seymour Allen	161		
Conservative	R. H. Buckby	78		
Majority		83		
Turnout		239		
Liberal win (new seat)				

=== Burton ===
Burton 1889
Party	Candidate	Votes	%	±%
Conservative	Sir Owen H. P. Scourfield, Bart	287		
Liberal	James James	97		
Majority		190		
Turnout		384		
Conservative win (new seat)				

=== Camrose ===
Camrose 1889
Party	Candidate	Votes	%	±%
Liberal	W. J. Owen	152		
Conservative	R. P. L. Penn	111		
Majority		41		
Turnout		263		
Liberal win (new seat)				

=== Carew ===
Carew 1889
Party	Candidate	Votes	%	±%
Liberal	H. G. Allen, Q.C.	Unopposed	N/A	N/A
Liberal win (new seat)				

=== Clydey ===
Clydey 1889
Party	Candidate	Votes	%	±%
Liberal	Lemuel Jones	174		
Conservative	J. Vaughan Colby	72		
Majority		102		
Turnout		246		
Liberal win (new seat)				

=== Castlemartin ===
Castlemartin 1889
Party	Candidate	Votes	%	±%
Conservative	Earl Cawdor	Unopposed	N/A	N/A
Conservative win (new seat)				

=== Eglwyswrw ===
Eglwyswrw 1889
Party	Candidate	Votes	%	±%
Liberal	T. Williams	Unopposed	N/A	N/A
Liberal win (new seat)				

=== Fishguard ===
Fishguard 1889
Party	Candidate	Votes	%	±%
Conservative	J. Worthington	218		
Liberal	William James	77		
Majority		142		
Turnout		295		
Conservative win (new seat)				

=== Haverfordwest St Mary's ===
Haverfordwest St Mary's 1889
Party	Candidate	Votes	%	±%
Liberal	S. Thomas	275		
Conservative	E. White	133		
Majority		142		
Turnout		408		
Liberal win (new seat)				

=== Haverfordwest, Prendergast and Uzmaston ===
Haverfordwest, Prendergast and Uzmaston 1889
Party	Candidate	Votes	%	±%
Conservative	Thomas James	123		
Liberal	Rev J. Jenkins	121		
Independent	Henry Davies	6		
Majority		2		
Turnout		250		
Conservative win (new seat)				

=== Haverfordwest, St Thomas and Furzy Park ===
Haverfordwest, St Thomas and Furzy Park 1889
Party	Candidate	Votes	%	±%
Conservative	R. T. P. Williams	204		
Liberal	William Williams	86		
Majority		118		
Turnout		290		
Conservative win (new seat)				

=== Haverfordwest St Martin's ===
St Martin's 1889
Party	Candidate	Votes	%	±%
Liberal	J. Thomas	101		
Conservative	E. Vaughan	95		
Majority		6		
Turnout		196		
Liberal win (new seat)				

=== Kilgerran ===
Kilgerran 1889
Party	Candidate	Votes	%	±%
Liberal	John Evans	158		
Conservative	E. Gower	149		
Majority		9		
Turnout		307		
Liberal win (new seat)				

=== Lampeter Velfrey ===
Lampeter Velfrey 1889
Party	Candidate	Votes	%	±%
Liberal	Rev Lewis James	Unopposed	N/A	N/A
Liberal win (new seat)				

=== Llanfyrnach ===
Llanfyrnach 1889
Party	Candidate	Votes	%	±%
Liberal	E. H. James	Unopposed	N/A	N/A
Liberal win (new seat)				

=== Llanwnda ===
Llanwnda 1889
Party	Candidate	Votes	%	±%
Liberal	W. Williams	187		
Conservative	E. Perkins	57		
Conservative	C. Mathias	25		
Majority		130		
Turnout		269		
Liberal win (new seat)				

=== Llawhaden ===
Llawhaden 1889
Party	Candidate	Votes	%	±%
Independent	William Jones	175		
Liberal	Richard John	133		
Majority		42		
Turnout		308		
Independent win (new seat)				

=== Llangwm ===
Llangwm 1889
Party	Candidate	Votes	%	±%
Liberal	R. Carrow	171		
Conservative	W. J. Avery	33		
Majority		138		
Turnout		204		
Liberal win (new seat)				

=== Llanstadwell ===
Llanstadwell 1889
Party	Candidate	Votes	%	±%
Independent	J. H. Coram	232		
Liberal	D. A. L. M'AIpin	133		
Majority		99		
Turnout		365		
Independent win (new seat)				

=== Maenclochog ===
Maenclochog 1889
Party	Candidate	Votes	%	±%
Liberal	Rev W. Griffiths	175		
Independent	J. P. Bushell	85		
Liberal	David Davies	49		
Majority		90		
Turnout		309		
Liberal win (new seat)				

=== Manorbier ===
Manorbier 1889
Party	Candidate	Votes	%	±%
Conservative	C. W. R. Stokes	159		
Liberal	W. Gibbs	111		
Majority		48		
Turnout		270		
Conservative win (new seat)				

=== Mathry ===
Mathry 1889
Party	Candidate	Votes	%	±%
Liberal	T. E. Thomas	208		
Conservative	J. Reynolds	48		
Majority		160		
Turnout		256		
Liberal win (new seat)				

=== Milford ===
Milford 1889
Party	Candidate	Votes	%	±%
Liberal	Dr Griffith	237		
Liberal	J. Ll. Davies	132		
Majority		105		
Turnout		369		
Liberal win (new seat)				

=== Monkton ===
Monkton 1889
Party	Candidate	Votes	%	±%
Conservative	Col. Morgan J. Saurin	175		
Liberal	W. Carey Rees	89		
Majority		86		
Turnout		261		
Conservative win (new seat)				

=== Nevern ===
Nevern 1889
Party	Candidate	Votes	%	±%
Liberal	J. Griffiths	192		
Conservative	James Bevan Bowen	167		
Majority		25		
Turnout		359		
Liberal win (new seat)				

=== Newport ===
Newport 1889
Party	Candidate	Votes	%	±%
Liberal	Dr D. Havard	Unopposed	N/A	N/A
Liberal win (new seat)				

=== Narberth North ===
Narberth North 1889
Party	Candidate	Votes	%	±%
Liberal	R. Ward	Unopposed	N/A	N/A
Liberal win (new seat)				

=== Pembroke (two seats) ===
Pembroke 1889
Party	Candidate	Votes	%	±%
Conservative	R. George	347		
Liberal	Dr W. J. Morrison	293		
Liberal	H. Mathias	261		
Conservative	Rev D. P. Davies	143		
Turnout		1,044		
Conservative win (new seat)				
Liberal win (new seat)				

=== Pembroke Dock (five seats) ===
None of the candidates were said to have openly run on political lines and no meetings took place during the campaign.

Pembroke Dock 1889
Party	Candidate	Votes	%	±%
Liberal	D. Hughes Brown	926		
Liberal	W. E. Seccombe	865		
Liberal	J. Williams	824		
Liberal	Isaac Smedley	706		
Conservative	Dr J. F. Stamper	595		
Liberal	J. Davie	529		
Liberal	S. Jenkins	426		
Conservative	Rev J. S. Allen	323		
Liberal	A. E. Owen	263		
Turnout		5,457		
Liberal win (new seat)				
Liberal win (new seat)				
Liberal win (new seat)				
Liberal win (new seat)				
Conservative win (new seat)				

=== St David's ===
St David's 1889
Party	Candidate	Votes	%	±%
Liberal	D. P. Williams	204		
Conservative	W. D. Propert	135		
Majority		69		
Turnout		369		
Liberal win (new seat)				

=== St Dogmaels ===
St Dogmaels 1889
Party	Candidate	Votes	%	±%
Liberal	J. Rees	159		
Conservative	E. C. Phillips	154		
Majority		5		
Turnout		314		
Liberal win (new seat)				

=== St Ishmaels ===
St Ishmaels 1889
Party	Candidate	Votes	%	±%
Liberal	Lord Kensington	Unopposed	N/A	N/A
Liberal win (new seat)				

=== St Issels ===
St Issels 1889
Party	Candidate	Votes	%	±%
Conservative	C. R. Vickerman	236		
Conservative	Major J. Birtwhistle	27		
Majority		209		
Turnout		263		
Conservative win (new seat)				

=== Slebech and Martletwy ===
Slebech and Martletwy 1889
Party	Candidate	Votes	%	±%
Conservative	Sir Charles Philipps	Unopposed	N/A	N/A
Conservative win (new seat)				

=== Staynton ===
Staynton 1889
Party	Candidate	Votes	%	±%
Conservative	J. T. Fisher	156		
Liberal	J. George	85		
Majority		71		
Turnout		241		
Conservative win (new seat)				

=== Tenby (two seats) ===
Tenby 1889
Party	Candidate	Votes	%	±%
Conservative	W. H. Richards	250		
Liberal	Mathias Thomas	236		
Conservative	N. A. Roch	157		
	J. A. Jenkins	126		
Conservative	B. G. Gifford	52		
Turnout		821		
Conservative win (new seat)				
Liberal win (new seat)				

=== Walwyn's Castle ===
Walwyn's Castle 1889
Party	Candidate	Votes	%	±%
Independent	W. Howell Walters	150		
Conservative	Capt. Goldwyer	80		
Majority		70		
Turnout		230		
Independent win (new seat)				

=== Whitchurch ===
Whitchurch 1889
Party	Candidate	Votes	%	±%
Liberal	John Thomas	205		
Conservative	G. D. Harries	120		
Majority		85		
Turnout		325		
Liberal win (new seat)				

=== Wiston ===
Wiston 1889
Party	Candidate	Votes	%	±%
Conservative	Captain Higgon	Unopposed	N/A	N/A
Conservative win (new seat)				

== Election of aldermen ==
In addition to the 51 councillors the council consisted of 16 county aldermen. Aldermen were elected by the council, and served a six-year term. Following the election of the initial sixteen aldermen, half of the aldermanic bench would be elected every three years following the triennial council election. After the initial elections, there were sixteen aldermanic vacancies and the following aldermen were appointed by the newly elected council (with the number of votes cast recorded in each case). A second vote was held to determine which aldermen should retire in three years. Consequent upon the election of aldermen who were councillors, further elections were required in Pembroke, Slebech and Martletwy, Wiston, Carew, and St Ishmaels's. Despite being an election, the decision on the aldermen was made by the Liberals in advance of the county council meeting.

=== Elected for six years ===
- H. G. Allen, Liberal (elected councillor for Carew) 42
- Lord Kensington, Liberal (elected councillor for St Ishmaels) 42
- James Bevan Bowen, Conservative (defeated candidate at Nevern) 31
- John Thomas, Llether 30, Liberal
- W. Gibbs, Hodgeston 29, Liberal
- William Williams, Haverfordwest 27, Liberal
- N. A. Roch, Tenby, Conservative (defeated candidate at Tenby) 24
- Captain Higgon 23, Conservative (elected councillor for Wiston)

=== Elected for three years ===
- W. E. Seccombe, Liberal (elected councillor for Pembroke Dock) 32
- G. P. Brewer, Narberth 29, Liberal
- R. Thomas, Trebover 29, Liberal
- W. Evans, Bletherston 28, Liberal
- Ben Rees, Granant 28, Liberal
- H. John Thomas, Lochturfin 28, Liberal
- W. Watts Williams, St David's 28, Liberal
- Sir Charles Philipps, Conservative (elected councillor for Slebech and Martletwy) 22

== By-elections ==
Five vacancies were caused by the election of aldermen.

=== Pembroke Dock by-election ===
The election to replace Alderman Secombe took place on Friday 15 February 1899 and was fought on political lines.

Pembroke Dock by-election 1889
Party	Candidate	Votes	%	±%
Liberal	Thomas George Seccombe	751		
Conservative	William Henry Gibby	587		
Liberal	Albert Edward Owen	27		

=== St Ishmaels by-election ===
The election which followed the elevation of Lord Kensington to alderman took place on Friday 15 February 1899 and was not fought on political lines.

St Ishmaels by-election 1889
Party	Candidate	Votes	%	±%
Liberal	James Thomas	173		
Liberal	John George	66		
