= 1907 Pembrokeshire County Council election =

1907 pembrokeshire country council election

The seventh election to Pembrokeshire County Council was held in March 1907. It was preceded by the 1904 election and followed by the 1910 election.

== Overview of the result ==
While there were a number of keenly contested wards a large number of wards were uncontested. The Conservatives took control of the Council in a result described by the Pembrokeshire Herald as a defeat for the "radical caucus". Even so, the Liberals polled strongly in northern parts of the county.

== Boundary changes ==
There were no boundary changes at this election.

== Ward results ==
=== Ambleston ===
Ambleston 1907
Party	Candidate	Votes	%	±%
Liberal	James Harries*	187		
Conservative	Victor Higgon	177		
Majority		10		
Turnout				
Liberal hold		Swing		

=== Amroth ===
Amroth 1907
Party	Candidate	Votes	%	±%
Conservative	J.C.S. Glanville	188		
Liberal	Colonel Ivor Philipps	115		
Majority		73		
Turnout				
Conservative hold		Swing		

=== Begelly ===
Begelly 1907
Party	Candidate	Votes	%	±%
Liberal	Henry Seymour Allen*	Unopposed		
Liberal hold		Swing		

=== Burton ===
Burton 1907
Party	Candidate	Votes	%	±%
Conservative	Sir Owen H. P. Scourfield, Bart.*	Unopposed		
Turnout				
Conservative hold		Swing		

=== Camrose ===
Camrose 1907
Party	Candidate	Votes	%	±%
Conservative	A.W. Massy	136		
Liberal	W.J. Canton*	106		
Majority		30		
Turnout				
Conservative gain from Liberal		Swing		

=== Carew ===
Carew 1907
Party	Candidate	Votes	%	±%
Conservative	J.F. Lort Phillips*	Unopposed		
Conservative hold		Swing		

=== Castlemartin ===
Castlemartin 1907
Party	Candidate	Votes	%	±%
Conservative	Lord Cawdor	Unopposed		
Conservative hold				

=== Cilgerran ===
Cilgerran 1907
Party	Candidate	Votes	%	±%
Conservative	John Vaughan Colby	223		
Liberal	Jonathan George*	125		
Majority		98		
Turnout				
Conservative hold		Swing		

=== Clydey ===
Clydey 1907
Party	Candidate	Votes	%	±%
Liberal	Evan Thomas*	187		
Conservative	Tom James	41		
Majority		146		
Turnout				
Liberal hold		Swing		

=== Eglwyswrw ===
Eglwyswrw 1907
Party	Candidate	Votes	%	±%
Liberal	Edward Robinson*	193		
Conservative	J. Thomas	70		
Majority		123		
Turnout				
Liberal hold		Swing		

=== Fishguard ===
Fishguard 1907
Party	Candidate	Votes	%	±%
Liberal	W.L. Williams*	268		
Conservative	James Charles Yorke	206		
Majority		62		
Turnout				
Liberal hold		Swing		

=== Haverfordwest, Prendergast and Uzmaston ===
Haverfordwest, Prendergast and Uzmaston 1907
Party	Candidate	Votes	%	±%
Liberal	W.T. Davies*	Unopposed		
Liberal hold		Swing		

=== Haverfordwest St Martin's and St Mary's ===
Haverfordwest St Martin's and St Mary's 1907
Party	Candidate	Votes	%	±%
Conservative	Hugh Saunders	272		
Liberal	Rev. James Phillips*	237		
Majority		35		
Turnout				
Conservative gain from Liberal		Swing		

=== Haverfordwest, St Thomas and Furzy Park ===
Haverfordwest, St Thomas and Furzy Park 1901
Party	Candidate	Votes	%	±%
Conservative	Archdeacon Hilbers	179		
Liberal	Isiah Reynolds*	173		
Majority		6		
Turnout				
Conservative gain from Liberal		Swing		

=== Haverfordwest St Martin's Hamlets ===
Haverfordwest St Martin's Hamlets 1907
Party	Candidate	Votes	%	±%
Conservative	E. White	115		
Liberal	T. Lewis	100		
Majority		15		
Turnout				
Conservative hold		Swing		

=== Henry's Mote ===
Henry's Mote 1907
Party	Candidate	Votes	%	±%
Liberal	Jenkin Soaram Evans*	Unopposed		
Liberal hold		Swing		

=== Lampeter Velfrey ===
Lampeter Velfrey 1907
Party	Candidate	Votes	%	±%
Liberal	Llewelyn Rees	216		
Liberal	W. Richards	56		
Majority		160		
Turnout				
Liberal hold		Swing		

=== Llanfyrnach ===
Llanfyrnach 1904
Party	Candidate	Votes	%	±%
Liberal	E.H. James*	Unopposed		
Liberal hold		Swing		

=== Llangwm ===
Llangwm 1907
Party	Candidate	Votes	%	±%
Conservative	Rev Henry Evans	135		
Liberal	S.W. Dawkins	127		
Majority		8		
Turnout				
Liberal Unionist hold		Swing		

=== Llanstadwell ===
Llanstadwell 1907
Party	Candidate	Votes	%	±%
Liberal	Rev W. Powell	Unopposed		
Liberal hold		Swing		

=== Llanwnda ===
Llanwnda 1901
Party	Candidate	Votes	%	±%
Liberal	Dr William Williams*	Unopposed		
Liberal hold		Swing		

=== Llawhaden ===
Llawhaden 1907
Party	Candidate	Votes	%	±%
Liberal	J.H. Evans*	207		
Liberal	John Morris	136		
Majority		71		
Turnout				
Liberal hold		Swing		

=== Maenclochog ===
Maenclochog 1907
Party	Candidate	Votes	%	±%
Liberal	James Henry Harries	180		
Liberal	Rev William Griffiths	133		
Majority		47		
Turnout				
Liberal hold		Swing		

=== Manorbier ===
Manorbier 1907
Party	Candidate	Votes	%	±%
Conservative	W.G.Parsell	159		
Liberal	T. Llewellin*	123		
Majority		36		
Turnout				
Conservative gain from Liberal		Swing		

=== Mathry ===
Mathry 1907
Party	Candidate	Votes	%	±%
Liberal	T.E. Thomas*	164		
Conservative	H.M. Harries	99		
Majority		65		
Turnout				
Liberal hold		Swing		

=== Milford ===
Milford 1907
Party	Candidate	Votes	%	±%
Liberal	Dr George Griffith*	Unopposed		
Liberal hold		Swing		

=== Monkton ===
Monkton 1904
Party	Candidate	Votes	%	±%
Conservative	Colonel Mierhouse	Unopposed		
Conservative hold		Swing		

=== Narberth North ===
Narberth North 1904
Party	Candidate	Votes	%	±%
Liberal	W.P. Morgan*	Unopposed		
Liberal hold		Swing		

=== Nevern ===
Nevern 1904
Party	Candidate	Votes	%	±%
Liberal	D.G. Griffiths*	Unopposed		
Liberal hold		Swing		

=== Newport ===
Newport 1904
Party	Candidate	Votes	%	±%
Liberal	Dr David Havard*	Unopposed		
Liberal hold		Swing		

=== Pembroke Ward 30 ===
Pembroke Ward 30 1904
Party	Candidate	Votes	%	±%
Liberal	Dan Davies*	Unopposed		
Liberal hold		Swing		

=== Pembroke Ward 31 ===
Pembroke Ward 31 1907
Party	Candidate	Votes	%	±%
Liberal	Benjamin Howell*	Unopposed		
Liberal hold		Swing		

=== Pembroke Dock Ward 32 ===
Pembroke Dock Ward 32 1907
Party	Candidate	Votes	%	±%
Liberal	William Grieve	Unopposed		
Liberal gain from Conservative		Swing		

=== Pembroke Dock Ward 33 ===
Pembroke Dock Ward 33 1907
Party	Candidate	Votes	%	±%
Liberal	Samuel Bolt Sketch*	Unopposed		
Liberal hold		Swing		

=== Pembroke Dock Ward 34 ===
Pembroke Dock Ward 34 1907
Party	Candidate	Votes	%	±%
Liberal	William Robinson	Unopposed		
Liberal hold		Swing		

=== Pembroke Dock Ward 35 ===
Pembroke Dock Ward 35 1901
Party	Candidate	Votes	%	±%
Liberal Unionist	David Hughes Brown*	Unopposed		
Liberal Unionist hold		Swing		

=== Pembroke Dock Ward 36 ===
Pembroke Dock Ward 36 1907
Party	Candidate	Votes	%	±%
Conservative	S.R. Allen*	Unopposed		
Conservative hold		Swing		

=== St David's ===
St David's 1907
Party	Candidate	Votes	%	±%
Liberal	John Howard Griffiths*	Unopposed		
Liberal hold		Swing		

=== St Dogmaels ===
St Dogmaels 1907
Party	Candidate	Votes	%	±%
Liberal	Benjamin Rees*	Unopposed		
Liberal hold		Swing		

=== St Ishmaels ===
St Ishmaels 1907
Party	Candidate	Votes	%	±%
Liberal	James Thomas*	Unopposed		
Liberal hold		Swing		

=== St Issels ===
St Issels 1907
Party	Candidate	Votes	%	±%
Conservative	C.R. Vickerman*	Unopposed		
Conservative hold		Swing		

=== Slebech and Martletwy ===
Slebech and Martletwy 1907
Party	Candidate	Votes	%	±%
Conservative	Sir C.E.G. Philipps Bart.*	Unopposed		
Conservative hold		Swing		

=== Steynton ===
Steynton 1907
Party	Candidate	Votes	%	±%
Conservative	J.T. Fisher*	Unopposed		
Conservative hold		Swing		

=== Tenby Ward 44 ===
Tenby Ward 44 1907
Party	Candidate	Votes	%	±%
Conservative	Clement J. Williams*	Unopposed		
Conservative hold		Swing		

=== Tenby Ward 45 ===
Tenby Ward 45 1907
Party	Candidate	Votes	%	±%
Conservative	C.W.R. Stokes*	193		
Liberal	C.F. Egerton Allen	145		
Majority		28		
Turnout				
Conservative hold		Swing		

=== Walwyn's Castle ===
Walwyn's Castle 1907
Party	Candidate	Votes	%	±%
Conservative	W. Howell Walters*	Unopposed		
Conservative hold		Swing		

=== Whitchurch ===
Whitchurch 1907
Party	Candidate	Votes	%	±%
Liberal	John Thomas*	Unopposed		
Liberal hold		Swing		

=== Wiston ===
Wiston 1907
Party	Candidate	Votes	%	±%
Conservative	Thomas Llewellin*	Unopposed		
Conservative hold		Swing		

== Election of aldermen ==
Aldermen were elected at the first meeting of the new council.
