= 1913 Pembrokeshire County Council election =

1913 Welsh local government election

The ninth election to Pembrokeshire County Council was held in March 1913. It was preceded by the 1910 election and followed by the 1919 election, as the scheduled 1916 election was postponed due to the First World War.

Candidates were returned unopposed for 34 of the 49 seats; eighteen of whom were Liberals and sixteen Conservatives. Nine seats held by Liberals and six Conservative-held seats were contested.
