= 1895 Pembrokeshire County Council election =

Local election in Wales

The third election to Pembrokeshire County Council was held in March 1895. It was preceded by the 1892 election and followed by the 1898 election.

== Overview of the result ==
In 1895 there were fewer uncontested returns than at the previous election in 1892, as the Conservatives launched a determined effort to take control of the county council. This resulted in substantial gains at the expense of the Liberals.

== Boundary changes ==
There were no boundary changes at this election.

== Ward results ==
=== Ambleston ===
Ambleston 1895
Party	Candidate	Votes	%	±%
Liberal	James Jenkins*	156		
Independent	J. Yorke	139		
Majority		17		
Turnout				
Liberal hold		Swing		

=== Amroth ===
Amroth 1895
Party	Candidate	Votes	%	±%
Conservative	Sackville Herbert Owen*	unopposed		
Conservative hold		Swing		

=== Begelly ===
Begelly 1895
Party	Candidate	Votes	%	±%
Liberal	T. John	158		
Conservative	W. Wilson	120		
Majority		38		
Turnout				
Liberal hold		Swing		

=== Burton ===
Burton 1895
Party	Candidate	Votes	%	±%
Conservative	Sir Owen H. P. Scourfield, Bart.*	unopposed		
Conservative hold		Swing		

=== Camrose ===
Camrose 1895
Party	Candidate	Votes	%	±%
Liberal	W.J. Canton*	139		
Conservative	Arthur Massey	121		
Majority		18		
Turnout				
Liberal hold		Swing		

=== Carew ===
The result did not appear in the local press but Lort Phillips was said to have been returned by a 'good majority'.

Carew 1895
Party	Candidate	Votes	%	±%
Conservative	F. Lort Phillips*			
Liberal				
Majority				
Turnout				
Conservative hold		Swing		

=== Clydey ===
Clydey 1895
Party	Candidate	Votes	%	±%
Liberal	Lemuel Jones*	unopposed		
Liberal hold		Swing		

=== Castlemartin ===
Castlemartin 1895
Party	Candidate	Votes	%	±%
Conservative	Henry Leach*	unopposed		
Conservative hold		Swing		

=== Eglwyswrw ===
Eglwyswrw 1895
Party	Candidate	Votes	%	±%
Liberal	W.J. Williams*	unopposed		
Liberal hold		Swing		

=== Fishguard ===
Fishguard 1895
Party	Candidate	Votes	%	±%
Conservative	Dr Swede	147		
Liberal	W.L. Williams	112		
Majority		35		
Turnout				
Conservative hold		Swing		

=== Haverfordwest St Martin's Hamlets ===
Haverfordwest St Martin's Hamlets 1895
Party	Candidate	Votes	%	±%
Conservative	O.H.S. Williams*	unopposed		
Conservative hold		Swing		

=== Haverfordwest, Prendergast and Uzmaston ===
The mayor, as returning officer, gave his casting vote in favour of the Liberal candidate.

Haverfordwest, Prendergast and Uzmaston 1895
Party	Candidate	Votes	%	±%
Liberal	Rev J. Jenkins	133		
Conservative	T. Rose	133		
Majority		0		
Turnout				
Liberal gain from Conservative		Swing		

=== Haverfordwest, St Thomas and Furzy Park ===
Haverfordwest, St Thomas and Furzy Park 1895
Party	Candidate	Votes	%	±%
Conservative	Colonel Esmonde White	153		
Liberal	John Llewellin	114		
Majority		39		
Turnout				
Conservative hold		Swing		

=== Haverfordwest St Martin's and St Mary's ===
Haverfordwest St Martin's and St Mary's 1895
Party	Candidate	Votes	%	±%
Conservative	Morris Owen	249		
Liberal	Roberts	209		
Majority		40		
Turnout				
Conservative gain from Liberal		Swing		

=== Kilgerran ===
Kilgerran 1895
Party	Candidate	Votes	%	±%
Conservative	J.V. Colby	unopposed		
Conservative gain from Liberal		Swing		

=== Lampeter Velfrey ===
Lampeter Velfrey 1895
Party	Candidate	Votes	%	±%
Liberal	Rev Lewis James*	unopposed		
Liberal hold		Swing		

=== Llanfyrnach ===
Llanfyrnach 1895
Party	Candidate	Votes	%	±%
Liberal	E.H. James*	unopposed		
Liberal hold		Swing		

=== Llanwnda ===
Llanwnda 1895
Party	Candidate	Votes	%	±%
Liberal	Dr William Williams*	unopposed		
Liberal hold		Swing		

=== Llangwm ===
Carrow appears to have been elected as a Liberal in 1892.

Llangwm 1895
Party	Candidate	Votes	%	±%
Conservative	Richard Carrow*	171		
Liberal	James Phillips	101		
Majority		70		
Turnout				
Conservative hold		Swing		

=== Llanstadwell ===
Llanstadwell 1895
Party	Candidate	Votes	%	±%
Liberal	John H. Coram*	unopposed		
Liberal hold		Swing		

=== Llawhaden ===
Llawhaden 1895
Party	Candidate	Votes	%	±%
Liberal	Richard John	unopposed		
Liberal hold		Swing		

=== Maenclochog ===
Maenclochog 1895
Party	Candidate	Votes	%	±%
Liberal	Rev William Griffiths*	unopposed		
Liberal hold		Swing		

=== Manorbier ===
Manorbier 1895
Party	Candidate	Votes	%	±%
Conservative	C.W.R. Stokes*	unopposed		
Conservative gain from Liberal		Swing		

=== Mathry ===
Mathry 1895
Party	Candidate	Votes	%	±%
Liberal	T.E. Thomas*	unopposed		
Liberal hold		Swing		

=== Milford ===
Dr Griffith had stood as a Liberal in 1892

Milford 1895
Party	Candidate	Votes	%	±%
Liberal Unionist	Dr George Griffith*	unopposed		
Liberal Unionist gain from Liberal		Swing		

=== Monkton ===
Monkton 1895
Party	Candidate	Votes	%	±%
Conservative	Col. Morgan J. Saurin*	unopposed		
Conservative hold		Swing		

=== Narberth North ===
Narberth North 1895
Party	Candidate	Votes	%	±%
Liberal	Robert Ward*	unopposed		
Liberal hold		Swing		

=== Nevern ===
Nevern 1895
Party	Candidate	Votes	%	±%
Liberal	Llewellyn Gilbert	unopposed		
Liberal hold		Swing		

=== Newport ===
Newport 1895
Party	Candidate	Votes	%	±%
Liberal	Dr David Havard*	unopposed		
Liberal hold		Swing		

=== Pembroke Ward 30 ===
Pembroke Ward 30 1895
Party	Candidate	Votes	%	±%
Conservative	W.H.O.M. Bryant	206		
Liberal	John Jones	158		
Majority		36		
Turnout				
Conservative gain from Independent		Swing		

=== Pembroke Ward 31 ===
Pembroke Ward 31 1895
Party	Candidate	Votes	%	±%
Conservative	Robert George	207		
Liberal	William Gibbs	118		
Majority				
Turnout				
Conservative hold		Swing		

=== Pembroke Dock Ward 32 ===
Pembroke Dock Ward 32 1895
Party	Candidate	Votes	%	±%
Conservative	T. Brown	149		
Liberal	S.J. Allen*	103		
Majority		46		
Turnout				
Conservative gain from Liberal		Swing		

=== Pembroke Dock Ward 33 ===
Pembroke Dock Ward 33 1895
Party	Candidate	Votes	%	±%
Liberal	James Williams*	unopposed		
Liberal hold		Swing		

=== Pembroke Dock Ward 34 ===
Stamper stood as a Liberal Unionist in 1892.

Pembroke Dock Ward 34 1895
Party	Candidate	Votes	%	±%
Conservative	Dr J.F. Stamper*	175		
Liberal	W. Davies	145		
Majority		30		
Turnout				
Conservative hold		Swing		

=== Pembroke Dock Ward 35 ===
Pembroke Dock Ward 35 1895
Party	Candidate	Votes	%	±%
Conservative	D. Hughes Brown*	unopposed		
Conservative hold		Swing		

=== Pembroke Dock Ward 36 ===
Pembroke Dock Ward 36 1895
Party	Candidate	Votes	%	±%
Conservative	S.R. Allen	138		
Liberal	Isaac Smedley*	94		
Majority		44		
Turnout				
Conservative gain from Liberal		Swing		

=== St David's ===
St David's 1895
Party	Candidate	Votes	%	±%
Liberal	J. Howard Griffiths*	193		
Conservative	J. Lewis	153		
Majority		40		
Turnout				
Liberal hold		Swing		

=== St Dogmaels ===
St Dogmaels 1895
Party	Candidate	Votes	%	±%
Liberal	Thomas Llewelyn	unopposed		
Liberal hold		Swing		

=== St Ishmaels ===
St Ishmaels 1895
Party	Candidate	Votes	%	±%
Liberal	James Thomas*	unopposed		
Liberal hold		Swing		

=== St Issels ===
St Issels 1895
Party	Candidate	Votes	%	±%
Conservative	C.R. Vickerman*	209		
Liberal	George Bancroft	112		
Majority				
Turnout				
Conservative hold		Swing		

=== Slebech and Martletwy ===
Slebech and Martletwy 1895
Party	Candidate	Votes	%	±%
Conservative	Sir C.E.G. Philipps Bart.	unopposed		
Conservative hold		Swing		

=== Steynton ===
Steynton 1895
Party	Candidate	Votes	%	±%
Conservative	J.T. Fisher*	168		
Liberal	Cole	127		
Majority		41		
Turnout				
Conservative hold		Swing		

=== Tenby Ward 44 ===
Tenby Ward 44 1895
Party	Candidate	Votes	%	±%
Conservative	Clement J. Williams	180		
Liberal	Benjamin Harris	109		
Majority		71		
Turnout				
Conservative hold		Swing		

=== Tenby Ward 45 ===
Tenby Ward 45 1892
Party	Candidate	Votes	%	±%
Conservative	W. Henry Richards*	200		
Liberal	John Lewis	105		
Majority		95		
Turnout				
Conservative hold		Swing		

=== Walwyn's Castle ===
Walwyn's Castle 1895
Party	Candidate	Votes	%	±%
Conservative	W. Howell Walters*	134		
Liberal	John George	129		
Majority		5		
Turnout				
Conservative hold		Swing		

=== Whitchurch ===
Whitchurch 1895
Party	Candidate	Votes	%	±%
Liberal	John Thomas*	192		
Conservative	Reynolds	98		
Majority		94		
Turnout				
Liberal hold		Swing		

=== Wiston ===
Wiston 1895
Party	Candidate	Votes	%	±%
Conservative	Thomas Llewellin*	unopposed		
Conservative hold		Swing		

== Election of aldermen ==
The election of aldermen reflected Conservative successes at the election.
