= 1892 Pembrokeshire County Council election =

Local election in Wales

The second election to Pembrokeshire County Council was held on 8 March 1892. It was preceded by the 1889 election and followed by the 1895 election.

== Overview of the result ==
At the inaugural election in 1889 most seats were contested, but three years later many of the sitting members were returned unopposed.

== Unopposed returns ==
In the vast majority of wards, candidates were returned unopposed. There were fewer contested elections than three years previously.

== Boundary changes ==
Multi-member wards in Pembroke and Pembroke Dock were replaced by single member wards. Tenby continued as a two member ward.

== Ward results ==
=== Ambleston ===
Ambleston 1892
Party	Candidate	Votes	%	±%
Liberal	James Jenkins	121		
Conservative	C. Mathias	117		
Liberal	Colonel Edwardes	43		
Majority				
Turnout				
Liberal hold		Swing		

=== Amroth ===
Amroth 1892
Party	Candidate	Votes	%	±%
Conservative	Sackville Herbert Owen*	unopposed		
Conservative hold		Swing		

=== Begelly ===
Begelly 1892
Party	Candidate	Votes	%	±%
Liberal	Henry Seymour Allen*	unopposed		
Liberal hold		Swing		

=== Burton ===
Burton 1892
Party	Candidate	Votes	%	±%
Conservative	Sir Owen H. P. Scourfield, Bart.*	unopposed		
Conservative hold		Swing		

=== Camrose ===
Camrose 1892
Party	Candidate	Votes	%	±%
Liberal	W.J. Canton	124		
Conservative	Arthur Massy	120		
Majority		4		
Turnout				
Liberal hold		Swing		

=== Carew ===
Carew 1892
Party	Candidate	Votes	%	±%
Conservative	F. Lort Phillips	unopposed		
Conservative gain from Liberal		Swing		

=== Clydey ===
Clydey 1892
Party	Candidate	Votes	%	±%
Liberal	Lemuel Jones*	unopposed		
Liberal hold		Swing		

=== Castlemartin ===
Earl Cawdor, who was elected at the inaugural election, was replaced by another Conservative representative.

Castlemartin 1892
Party	Candidate	Votes	%	±%
Conservative	Colonel Henry Leach	173		
Liberal	T.M.G. Williams	77		
Majority				
Turnout				
Conservative hold		Swing		

=== Eglwyswrw ===
The returning member gave his casting vote in favour of the sitting member, Thomas Williams.

Eglwyswrw 1892
Party	Candidate	Votes	%	±%
Liberal	Thomas Williams*	168		
Liberal	Thomas Vaughan	168		
Majority		0		
Turnout				
Liberal hold		Swing		

=== Fishguard ===
Fishguard 1892
Party	Candidate	Votes	%	±%
Conservative	John Worthington*	unopposed		
Conservative hold		Swing		

=== Haverfordwest St Martin's Hamlets ===
Haverfordwest St Martin's Hamlets 1892
Party	Candidate	Votes	%	±%
Conservative	O.H.S. Williams	109		
Liberal	Joseph Thomas*	84		
Majority		25		
Turnout				
Conservative gain from Liberal		Swing		

=== Haverfordwest, Prendergast and Uzmaston ===
Haverfordwest, Prendergast and Uzmaston 1892
Party	Candidate	Votes	%	±%
Conservative	Thomas James*	135		
Liberal	Rev J. Jenkins	128		
Majority		7		
Turnout				
Conservative hold		Swing		

=== Haverfordwest, St Thomas and Furzy Park ===
Haverfordwest, St Thomas and Furzy Park 1892
Party	Candidate	Votes	%	±%
Conservative	R. T. P. Williams*	unopposed		
Conservative hold		Swing		

=== Haverfordwest St Martin's and St Mary's ===
Haverfordwest St Martin's and St Mary's 1892
Party	Candidate	Votes	%	±%
Liberal	Howard Davies	Unopposed	N/A	N/A
Liberal hold				

=== Kilgerran ===
Kilgerran 1892
Party	Candidate	Votes	%	±%
Liberal	Dr J. Stevens	187		
Conservative	Capt. E. Gower	150		
Majority		37		
Turnout				
Liberal hold		Swing		

=== Lampeter Velfrey ===
Lampeter Velfrey 1892
Party	Candidate	Votes	%	±%
Liberal	Rev Lewis James*	unopposed		
Liberal hold		Swing		

=== Llanfyrnach ===
Llanfyrnach 1892
Party	Candidate	Votes	%	±%
Liberal	E.H. James*	unopposed		
Liberal hold		Swing		

=== Llanwnda ===
Llanwnda 1892
Party	Candidate	Votes	%	±%
Liberal	Dr William Williams*	unopposed		
Liberal hold		Swing		

=== Llangwm ===
Llangwm 1892
Party	Candidate	Votes	%	±%
Liberal	Richard Carrow*	unopposed		
Liberal hold		Swing		

=== Llanstadwell ===
Llanstadwell 1892
Party	Candidate	Votes	%	±%
Liberal	John H. Coram*	unopposed		
Liberal gain from Independent		Swing		

=== Llawhaden ===
Llawhaden 1892
Party	Candidate	Votes	%	±%
Liberal	Rev D. Rees	173		
Conservative	R.S. Lewis	103		
Majority		70		
Turnout				
Liberal gain from Independent		Swing		

=== Maenclochog ===
Maenclochog 1892
Party	Candidate	Votes	%	±%
Liberal	Rev William Griffiths*	unopposed		
Liberal hold		Swing		

=== Manorbier ===
Manorbier 1892
Party	Candidate	Votes	%	±%
Conservative	C.W.R. Stokes*	unopposed		
Conservative hold		Swing		

=== Mathry ===
Mathry 1892
Party	Candidate	Votes	%	±%
Liberal	T.E. Thomas*	unopposed		
Liberal hold		Swing		

=== Milford ===
Milford 1892
Party	Candidate	Votes	%	±%
Liberal	Dr George Griffith	unopposed		
Liberal hold		Swing		

=== Monkton ===
Monkton 1892
Party	Candidate	Votes	%	±%
Conservative	Col. Morgan J. Saurin*	unopposed		
Conservative hold		Swing		

=== Nevern ===
Nevern 1892
Party	Candidate	Votes	%	±%
Liberal	John Griffiths*	unopposed		
Liberal hold		Swing		

=== Newport ===
Newport 1892
Party	Candidate	Votes	%	±%
Liberal	Dr D. Havard*	unopposed		
Liberal hold		Swing		

=== Narberth North ===
Narberth North 1892
Party	Candidate	Votes	%	±%
Liberal	Robert Ward*	unopposed		
Liberal hold		Swing		

=== Pembroke Ward 30 ===
Pembroke Ward 30 1892
Party	Candidate	Votes	%	±%
Independent	Joshua W, Morrison	unopposed		
Independent win (new seat)				

=== Pembroke Ward 31 ===
Pembroke Ward 31 1892
Party	Candidate	Votes	%	±%
Conservative	Robert Morgan	173		
Liberal	W.T. Morgan	137		
Majority		36		
Turnout				
Conservative win (new seat)				

=== Pembroke Dock Ward 32 ===
Pembroke Dock Ward 32 1892
Party	Candidate	Votes	%	±%
Liberal	S.J. Allen	unopposed		
Liberal win (new seat)				

=== Pembroke Dock Ward 33 ===
Pembroke Dock Ward 33 1892
Party	Candidate	Votes	%	±%
Liberal	James Williams*	unopposed		
Liberal win (new seat)				

=== Pembroke Dock Ward 34 ===
Pembroke Dock Ward 34 1892
Party	Candidate	Votes	%	±%
Liberal Unionist	Dr J.F. Stamper*	unopposed		
Liberal Unionist win (new seat)				

=== Pembroke Dock Ward 35 ===
Pembroke Dock Ward 35 1892
Party	Candidate	Votes	%	±%
Conservative	D. Hughes Brown*	unopposed		
Conservative win (new seat)				

=== Pembroke Dock Ward 36 ===
Pembroke Dock Ward 36 1892
Party	Candidate	Votes	%	±%
Liberal	Isaac Smedley*	unopposed		
Liberal win (new seat)				

=== St David's ===
St David's 1892
Party	Candidate	Votes	%	±%
Liberal	J. Howard Griffiths	208		
Conservative	M.D. Propert	126		
Majority		82		
Turnout				
Liberal hold		Swing		

=== St Dogmaels ===
St Dogmaels 1892
Party	Candidate	Votes	%	±%
Liberal	John Rees*	unopposed		
Liberal hold		Swing		

=== St Ishmaels ===
St Ishmaels 1892
Party	Candidate	Votes	%	±%
Liberal	James Thomas*	unopposed		
Liberal hold		Swing		

=== St Issels ===
St Issels 1892
Party	Candidate	Votes	%	±%
Conservative	C.R. Vickerman*	unopposed		
Conservative hold		Swing		

=== Slebech and Martletwy ===
Slebech and Martletwy 1892
Party	Candidate	Votes	%	±%
Conservative	J.V. Colby	unopposed		
Conservative hold		Swing		

=== Staynton ===
Staynton 1892
Party	Candidate	Votes	%	±%
Conservative	J.T. Fisher*	Unopposed		
Conservative hold		Swing		

=== Tenby (two seats) ===
Tenby 1892
Party	Candidate	Votes	%	±%
Conservative	W. Henry Richards*	unopposed		
Conservative	Clement J. Williams	unopposed		
Conservative hold		Swing		
Conservative gain from Liberal		Swing		

=== Walwyn's Castle ===
Walwyn's Castle 1892
Party	Candidate	Votes	%	±%
Conservative	W. Howell Walters*	unopposed		
Conservative gain from Independent		Swing		

=== Whitchurch ===
Whitchurch 1892
Party	Candidate	Votes	%	±%
Liberal	John Thomas*	169		
Independent	F.R. Howell	145		
Majority		24		
Turnout				
Liberal hold		Swing		

=== Wiston ===
Wiston 1892
Party	Candidate	Votes	%	±%
Conservative	T. Llewellin	unopposed		
Conservative hold		Swing		

== Election of aldermen ==
Mr G. P. Brewer (L.), N arberth, 46 votes; Mr Joseph Thomas (L.), Haverfordwest, 38; Mr Benjamin Rees (L.), Granant, 38; Mr H. Seymour Allen (L.), Crescelly, 28; Rev William Evans (L.), Pembroke Dock, 23 Mr R. Thomas (L.). Trebover, 28; Mr William Watts Williams (L.), St. David's, 28; Mr William Mason (L.), Pem- broke Dock, 26.
