= 1898 Pembrokeshire County Council election =

Historic council election

The fourth election to Pembrokeshire County Council was held in March 1898. It was preceded by the 1895 election and followed by the 1901 election.

== Overview of the result ==
In 1898 there were a number of uncontested seats but most seats were contested as the Conservatives sought to hold on to gains made in 1895.

== Boundary changes ==
There were no boundary changes at this election.

== Ward results ==
=== Ambleston ===
Ambleston 1898
Party	Candidate	Votes	%	±%
Conservative	R.H. Harries	188		
Liberal	James Jenkins*	135		
Majority		53		
Turnout				
Conservative gain from Liberal		Swing		

=== Amroth ===
Amroth 1898
Party	Candidate	Votes	%	±%
Conservative	Sackville Herbert Owen*	Unopposed		
Conservative hold		Swing		

=== Begelly ===
Begelly 1898
Party	Candidate	Votes	%	±%
Liberal	Henry Seymour Allen	Unopposed		
Liberal hold		Swing		

=== Burton ===
Burton 1898
Party	Candidate	Votes	%	±%
Conservative	Sir Owen H. P. Scourfield, Bart.*	245		
Liberal	Walter Evans	126		
Majority		119		
Turnout				
Conservative hold		Swing		

=== Camrose ===
Camrose 1898
Party	Candidate	Votes	%	±%
Conservative	R. Penn	142		
Liberal	W.J. Canton*	125		
Majority		17		
Turnout				
Conservative gain from Liberal		Swing		

=== Carew ===
Carew 1898
Party	Candidate	Votes	%	±%
Conservative	F. Lort Phillips*	Unopposed		
Conservative hold		Swing		

=== Clydey ===
Clydey 1898
Party	Candidate	Votes	%	±%
Liberal	Lemuel Jones*	Unopposed		
Liberal hold		Swing		

=== Castlemartin ===
Castlemartin 1898
Party	Candidate	Votes	%	±%
Conservative	Henry Leach*	Unopposed		
Conservative hold		Swing		

=== Eglwyswrw ===
Eglwyswrw 1898
Party	Candidate	Votes	%	±%
Liberal	E. Robinson	Unopposed		
Liberal hold		Swing		

=== Fishguard ===
Fishguard 1898
Party	Candidate	Votes	%	±%
Independent	James Charles Yorke	179		
Liberal	John Clement James	131		
Majority		48		
Turnout				
Independent gain from Conservative		Swing		

=== Haverfordwest St Martin's Hamlets ===
Haverfordwest St Martin's Hamlets 1898
Party	Candidate	Votes	%	±%
Conservative	O.H.S. Williams*	119		
Liberal	Philip White	67		
Majority		52		
Turnout				
Conservative hold		Swing		

=== Haverfordwest, Prendergast and Uzmaston ===
Haverfordwest, Prendergast and Uzmaston 1898
Party	Candidate	Votes	%	±%
Conservative	Marlay Samson	151		
Liberal	W. Davies	138		
Majority		13		
Turnout				
Conservative gain from Liberal		Swing		

=== Haverfordwest, St Thomas and Furzy Park ===
Haverfordwest, St Thomas and Furzy Park 1898
Party	Candidate	Votes	%	±%
Conservative	Harry Philipps	231		
Liberal	Ebenezer Davies	85		
Majority				
Turnout				
Conservative hold		Swing		

=== Haverfordwest St Martin's and St Mary's ===
St Martin's 1898
Party	Candidate	Votes	%	±%
Liberal	John Llewellin	251		
Conservative	Morris Owen*	220		
Majority		31		
Turnout				
Liberal gain from Conservative		Swing		

=== Kilgerran ===
Kilgerran 1898
Party	Candidate	Votes	%	±%
Conservative	J.V. Colby*	Unopposed		
Conservative gain from Liberal		Swing		

=== Lampeter Velfrey ===
Lampeter Velfrey 1898
Party	Candidate	Votes	%	±%
Liberal	Rev Lewis James*	214		
Conservative	Morgans	56		
Majority		156		
Turnout				
Liberal hold		Swing		

=== Llanfyrnach ===
Llanfyrnach 1898
Party	Candidate	Votes	%	±%
Liberal	E.H. James*	Unopposed		
Liberal hold		Swing		

=== Llanwnda ===
Llanwnda 1898
Party	Candidate	Votes	%	±%
Liberal	Dr William Williams*	Unopposed		
Liberal hold		Swing		

=== Llangwm ===
Carrow was elected as a Liberal in 1892 and a Conservative in 1895.

Llangwm 1898
Party	Candidate	Votes	%	±%
Liberal Unionist	Richard Carrow*	Unopposed		
Liberal Unionist hold		Swing		

=== Llanstadwell ===
Llanstadwell 1898
Party	Candidate	Votes	%	±%
Liberal	John H. Coram*	Unopposed		
Liberal hold		Swing		

=== Llawhaden ===
Llawhaden 1898
Party	Candidate	Votes	%	±%
Liberal	Richard John*	Unopposed		
Liberal hold		Swing		

=== Maenclochog ===
Maenclochog 1898
Party	Candidate	Votes	%	±%
Liberal	Rev William Griffiths*	Unopposed		
Liberal hold		Swing		

=== Manorbier ===
Manorbier 1898
Party	Candidate	Votes	%	±%
Conservative	Charles William Rees Stokes*	Unopposed		
Conservative hold		Swing		

=== Mathry ===
Mathry 1898
Party	Candidate	Votes	%	±%
Liberal	T.E. Thomas*	Unopposed		
Liberal hold		Swing		

=== Milford ===
Dr Griffith had stood as a Liberal in 1892 and a Liberal Unionist in 1895.

Milford 1898
Party	Candidate	Votes	%	±%
Liberal	Dr George Griffith*	Unopposed		
Liberal gain from Liberal Unionist		Swing		

=== Monkton ===
Monkton 1898
Party	Candidate	Votes	%	±%
Conservative	Major W.S. Wynne	Unopposed		
Conservative hold		Swing		

=== Narberth North ===
Narberth North 1898
Party	Candidate	Votes	%	±%
Liberal	Robert Ward*	162		
Conservative	Davies	129		
Majority		33		
Turnout				
Liberal hold		Swing		

=== Nevern ===
Nevern 1898
Party	Candidate	Votes	%	±%
Liberal	Llewellyn Gilbert*	Unopposed		
Liberal hold		Swing		

=== Newport ===
Newport 1898
Party	Candidate	Votes	%	±%
Liberal	Dr David Havard*	Unopposed		
Liberal hold		Swing		

=== Pembroke Ward 30 ===
Pembroke Ward 30 1898
Party	Candidate	Votes	%	±%
Conservative	W.H.O.M. Bryant*	219		
Liberal	Davies	142		
Majority		77		
Turnout				
Conservative gain from Independent		Swing		

=== Pembroke Ward 31 ===
Pembroke Ward 31 1898
Party	Candidate	Votes	%	±%
Conservative	Robert George	Unopposed		
Conservative hold		Swing		

=== Pembroke Dock Ward 32 ===
Pembroke Dock Ward 32 1898
Party	Candidate	Votes	%	±%
Conservative	T. Brown*	134		
Liberal	W. Davies	104		
Majority		30		
Turnout				
Conservative hold		Swing		

=== Pembroke Dock Ward 33 ===
Pembroke Dock Ward 33 1898
Party	Candidate	Votes	%	±%
Liberal	Samuel Bolt Sketch*	Unopposed		
Liberal hold		Swing		

=== Pembroke Dock Ward 34 ===
Pembroke Dock Ward 34 1898
Party	Candidate	Votes	%	±%
Conservative	Dr J.F. Stamper*	177		
Liberal	W. Ivemy	172		
Majority		5		
Turnout				
Conservative hold		Swing		

=== Pembroke Dock Ward 35 ===
Pembroke Dock Ward 35 1898
Party	Candidate	Votes	%	±%
Conservative	David Hughes Brown*	Unopposed		
Conservative hold		Swing		

=== Pembroke Dock Ward 36 ===
Pembroke Dock Ward 36 1898
Party	Candidate	Votes	%	±%
Conservative	S.R. Allen*	186		
Liberal	J.H. Silcox	50		
Majority		136		
Turnout				
Conservative hold		Swing		

=== St David's ===
St David's 1898
Party	Candidate	Votes	%	±%
Liberal	J. Howard Griffiths*	Unopposed		
Liberal hold		Swing		

=== St Dogmaels ===
St Dogmaels 1898
Party	Candidate	Votes	%	±%
Liberal	T. Havard*	Unopposed		
Liberal hold		Swing		

=== St Ishmaels ===
St Ishmaels 1898
Party	Candidate	Votes	%	±%
Liberal	James Thomas*	Unopposed		
Liberal hold		Swing		

=== St Issels ===
St Issels 1898
Party	Candidate	Votes	%	±%
Conservative	C.R. Vickerman*	Unopposed		
Conservative hold		Swing		

=== Slebech and Martletwy ===
Slebech and Martletwy 1898
Party	Candidate	Votes	%	±%
Conservative	Sir C.E.G. Philipps Bart.*	Unopposed		
Conservative hold		Swing		

=== Steynton ===
Steynton 1898
Party	Candidate	Votes	%	±%
Conservative	J.T. Fisher*	Unopposed		
Conservative hold		Swing		

=== Tenby Ward 44 ===
Tenby Ward 44 1898
Party	Candidate	Votes	%	±%
Conservative	Clement J. Williams*	198		
Liberal	Egerton Allen	59		
Majority		139		
Turnout				
Conservative hold		Swing		

=== Tenby Ward 45 ===
Tenby Ward 45 1898
Party	Candidate	Votes	%	±%
Conservative	H.J. Gregory*	192		
Liberal	Egerton Allen	65		
Majority		127		
Turnout				
Conservative hold		Swing		

=== Walwyn's Castle ===
Walwyn's Castle 1898
Party	Candidate	Votes	%	±%
Conservative	W. Howell Walters*	182		
Liberal	John George	95		
Majority		87		
Turnout				
Conservative hold		Swing		

=== Whitchurch ===
Whitchurch 1898
Party	Candidate	Votes	%	±%
Liberal	John Thomas*	Unopposed		
Liberal hold		Swing		

=== Wiston ===
Wiston 1898
Party	Candidate	Votes	%	±%
Conservative	Thomas Llewellin*	Unopposed		
Conservative hold		Swing		

== Election of aldermen ==
Aldermen were elected at the first meeting of the new council.
